= Fritz Hofmann =

Fritz Hofmann is the name of:

- Fritz Hofmann (chemist) (1866–1956), German chemist
- Fritz Hofmann (athlete) (1871–1927), German athlete
- Fritz Hofmann (politician) (1924–2005), Swiss politician

== See also ==
- Fritz Hoffmann, founder of Hoffmann-La Roche
