= Burgdorferkrieg =

Coat of arms of Neu-Kyburg, replacing the black field of the original coat of arms with the red of the House of Habsburg.

The Burgdorferkrieg (German: Burgdorf war) or Kyburgerkrieg (German: Kyburg war) was a war in 1383–84 between the counts of Neu-Kyburg and the city of Bern for supremacy in the County of Burgundy in what is now Switzerland.

== History ==
The counts of Kyburg were a medieval noble family in central and northern Switzerland and Swabia. Throughout the 12th and 13th centuries they had expanded in power and influence. In 1250/51 the childless Hartmann IV of Kyburg gave the western part of the property with the center of Burgdorf to his nephew Hartmann V. After Hartmann V's death Count Rudolf von Habsburg took over the administration of the western section of the Kyburg lands and eventually reunited them. The family of Neu-Kyburg began to rule the united Kyburg lands as Habsburg vassals. In 1322, the brothers Eberhard II and Hartmann II of Neu-Kyburg started fighting with each other over who would inherit the undivided lands. The fighting led to the "fratricide at Thun Castle" where Eberhard killed his brother Hartmann. To avoid punishment by his Habsburg overlords, Eberhard fled to Bern. In the following year, he sold the town of Thun, its castle and the land surrounding Thun to Bern. Bern granted the land back to Eberhard as a fief and the Neu-Kyburgs became connected to Bern, but was often in conflict with the city.

In the 14th century, the Neu-Kyburgs became increasingly indebted. On 11 November 1382, Count Rudolf II of Neu-Kyburg, launched a raid against the city of Solothurn to try and force the city to forgive his debts. For the city of Bern, this attack on an allied represented an excellent opportunity for the city to break its ties with the Neu-Kyburgs.

The city prepared by acquiring loans from Basel and weapons from Lucerne. They convinced the Neu-Kyburg's patron, the Austrian Duke Leopold III of Habsburg to not interfere. They then got promises of military support from Savoy, Neuchâtel and for the first time, based on the Federal Charter of 1353, the Swiss Confederation.

== The siege of Burgdorf ==
Bern began the war by attacking Neu-Kyburg vassals in the Emmental and Oberaargau regions. This was followed in March 1383 by the main attack on the Neu-Kyburg administrative center at the castle and the town of Burgdorf. The Bernese-Solothurn army was supported with troops from the Forest Cantons, Lucerne, Zurich, Neuchatel and Savoy and were armed with catapults and primitive guns. Because Count Rudolf II had died before the war began, Burgdorf was defended by Rudolf's uncle, Berchtold I. Under Berchtold, Burgdorf withstood a 45-day siege. An attempt to negotiate a cease-fire on 21 April 1383, between Bern and the citizens of Burgdorf against the Neu-Kyburgs was also unsuccessful.

== Aftermath ==
Beset by enormous burdens of war and civil unrest at home, the Bernese Council sought Confederation mediation to end the war. On 5 April 1384, the Neu-Kyburgs agreed to sell the towns and castles of Burgdorf and Thun to Bern for 37,800 guilders. These two towns would allow Bern to expand into the Bernese Oberland, the Emmental and largest markets in the region. Bern accepted the treaty on 7 April and ended the war. For the Neu-Kyburgs, the loss of Burgdorf and Thun spelled the end of their power. The family was given the rights to Laupen Castle, but had limited freedoms. They were not allowed to move freely, had limited military rights and mandatory Confederation arbitration in disputes.

== See also ==
- Battles of the Old Swiss Confederacy
