= Lützelflüh-Goldbach =

Coordinates: 47.006°N 7.685°E

Lützelflüh-Goldbach is a Swiss twin suburb located about 36 km driving distance from Bern and 9 km from Burgdorf, Switzerland.

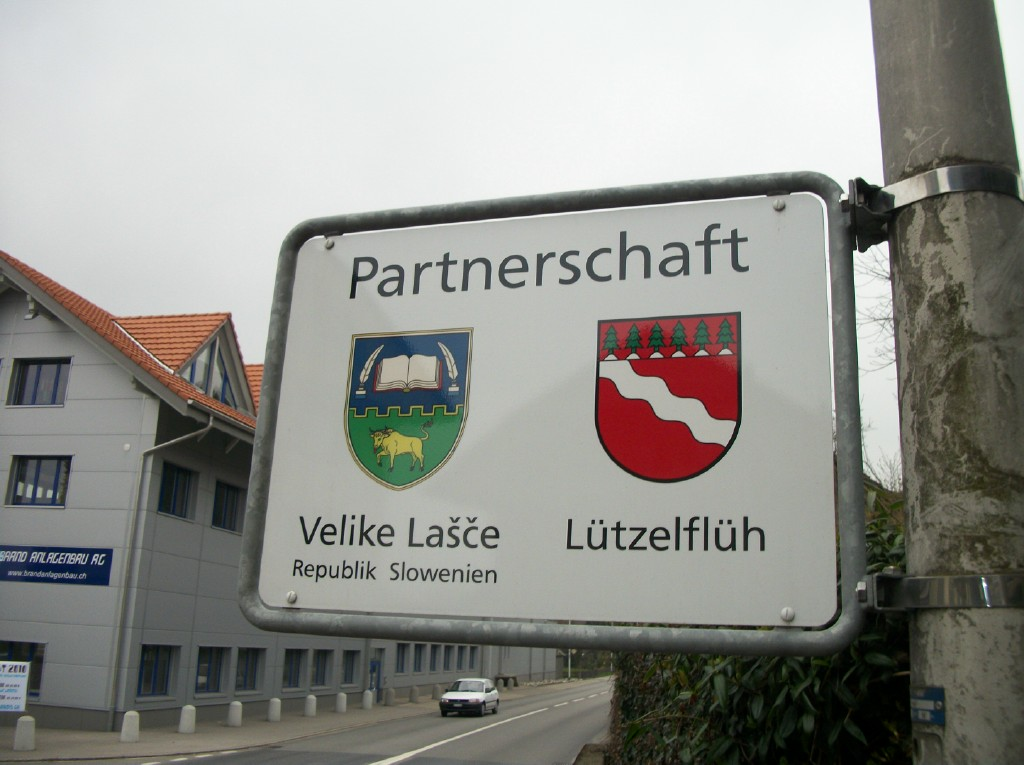
A board in Lützelflüh-Goldbach

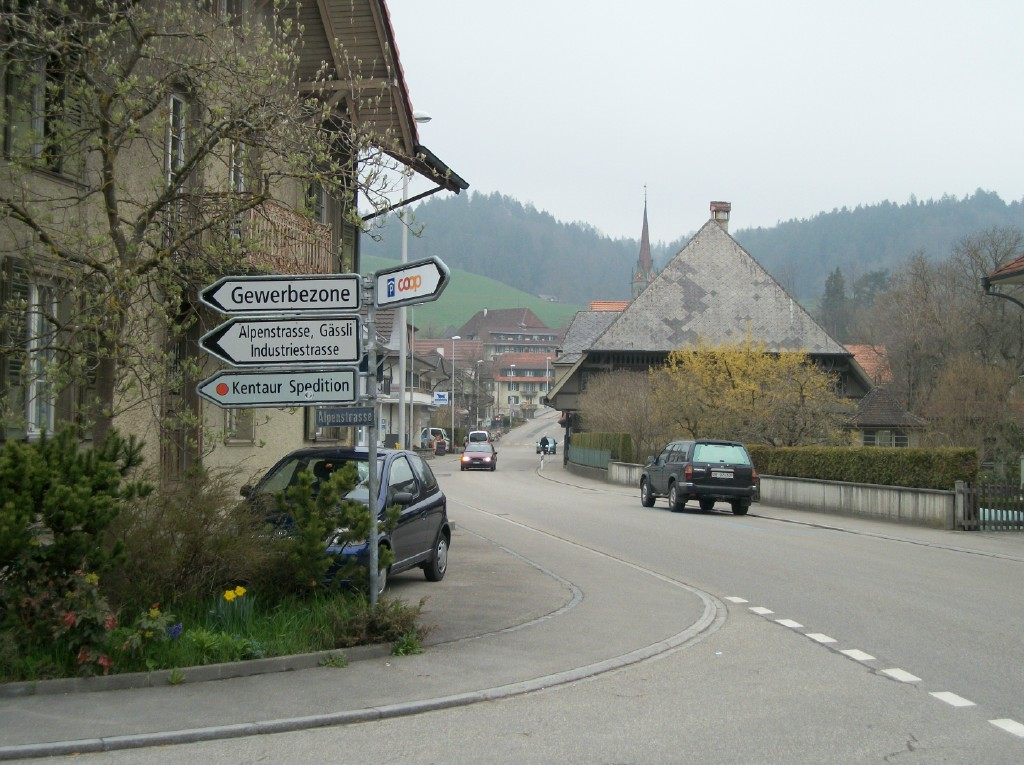
A road in Lützelflüh-Goldbach

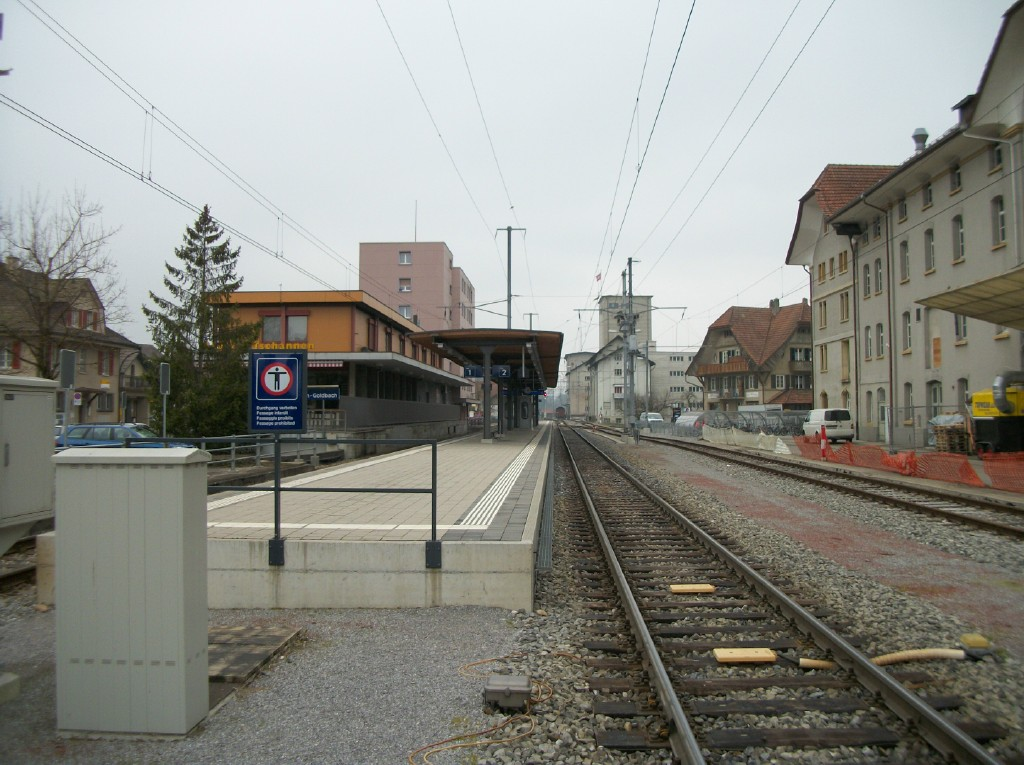
Lützelflüh-Goldbach railway station

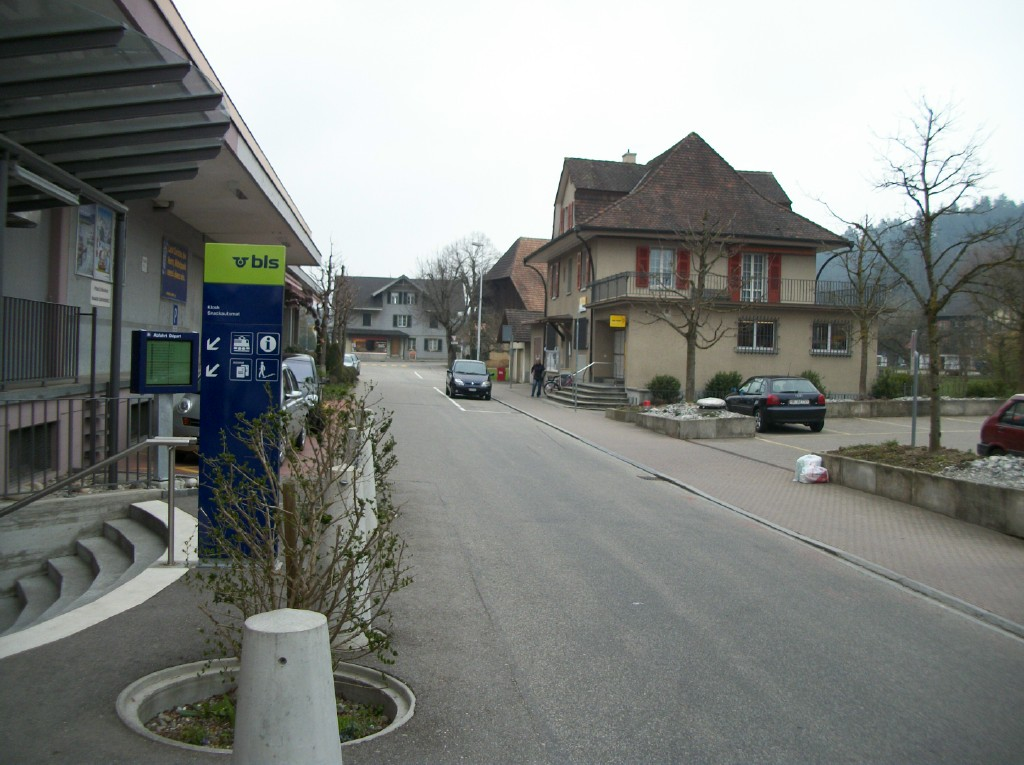
Lützelflüh-Goldbach railway station entrance on the left
