= Oberburg railway station =

Railway station in Oberburg, Switzerland

Oberburg
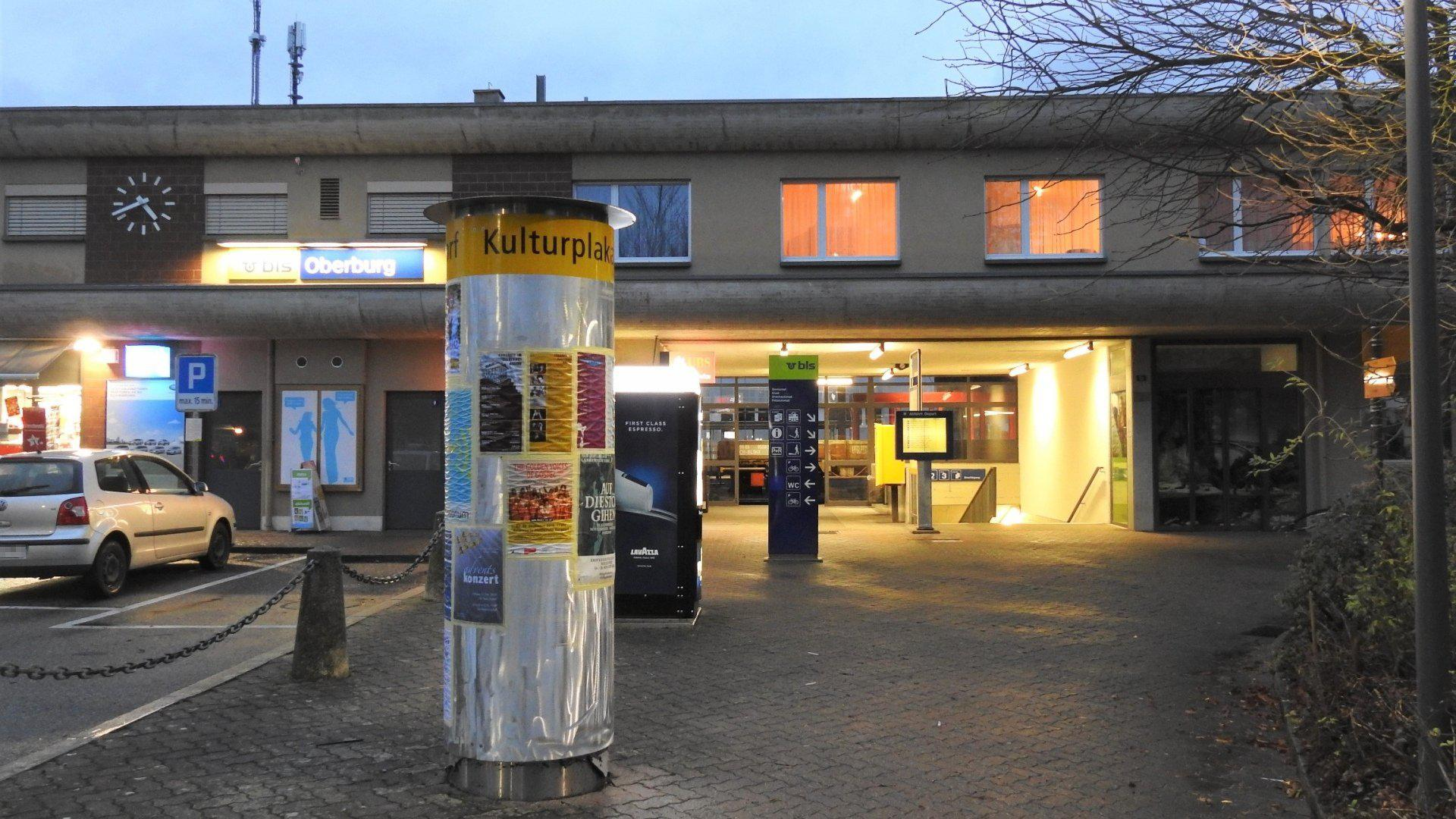
- The station entrance in 2018

General information
- Location: Bahnhofstrasse 3; 3414 Burgdorf/Oberburg; Switzerland
- Coordinates: 47°02′N 7°38′E
- Elevation: 547 m (1,795 ft)
- Owner: BLS AG
- Lines: Burgdorf–Thun line; Solothurn–Langnau line
- Distance: 24.3 km (15.1 mi) from Solothurn
- Platforms: 2 (1 island platform)
- Tracks: 4
- Train operators: BLS AG

Construction
- Parking: 0
- Accessible: Yes

Other information
- Station code: 8508080 (OBB)
- Fare zone: 150 (Libero)

Passengers
- 2023: 1'300 per weekday (BLS)

Services
| Preceding station | Bern S-Bahn | Following station |
|---|---|---|
| Burgdorf Steinhof towards Thun | S4 | Hasle-Rüegsau towards Langnau i.E. |
| Burgdorf Steinhof towards Solothurn | S41 | Hasle-Rüegsau towards Thun |
| Burgdorf Steinhof towards Burgdorf | S42 Limited service | Hasle-Rüegsau towards Thun |
| Burgdorf Steinhof towards Thun | S44 | Hasle-Rüegsau towards Sumiswald-Grünen |
Location

Oberburg railway station (German: Bahnhof Oberburg) is a railway station on the border of municipalities of Burgdorf and Oberburg, in the Swiss canton of Bern. It is an intermediate stop on the standard gauge Burgdorf–Thun and Solothurn–Langnau lines of BLS AG.

== Services ==
As of the December 2024 timetable change, the following services stop at Oberburg:

- Bern S-Bahn:
  - S4/S44: half-hourly service to Thun and hourly service to Langnau i.E. or Sumiswald-Grünen.
  - S41: hourly service between Thun and Solothurn.
  - S42: limited service between Burgdorf and Thun.
