= Burgdorf Castle =

Castle in Burgdorf, Bern, Switzerland

- Schloss Burgdorf
- Burgdorf, Switzerland
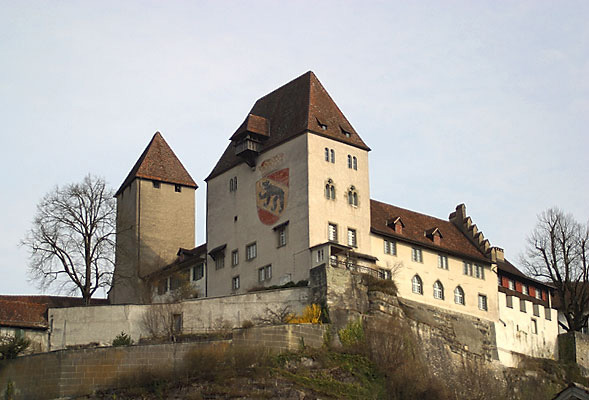
- Burgdorf Castle

Site information
- Type: Castle
- Owner: Canton of Bern
- Open to the public: yes

Location
- Coordinates: 47.054763°N 7.629163°E

Site history
- Built: 1200
- Built by: Berthold V, Duke of Zähringen
- Materials: stone

Swiss Cultural Property of National Significance

Burgdorf Castle (German: Schloss Burgdorf) is a castle in the municipality of Burgdorf in the canton of Bern in Switzerland. It is a Swiss heritage site of national significance. The castle is 800 years old.

== History ==
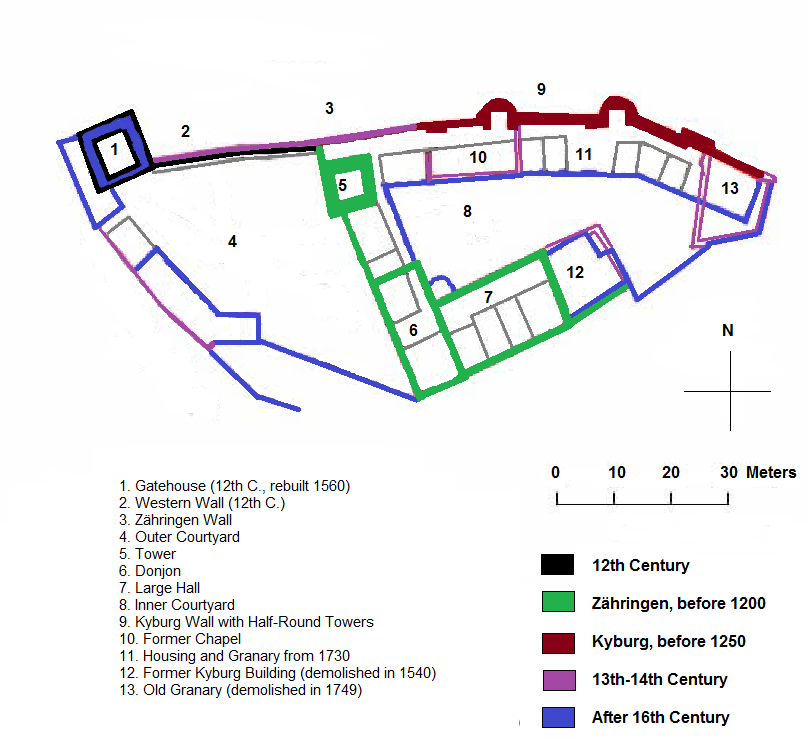
Plan of the castle showing construction phases

During the High Middle Ages the land that would become Burgdorf was owned by the Kingdom of Burgundy and then after 1080 by the Dukes of Zähringen. Either the kings or the dukes built a castle on the left bank of the Emme river, this castle was first mentioned in 1080 as castellum Bertoldi ducis. In 1077 and 1084, a fortification on the Emme was mentioned, but the specific castle was not named, but it may have referred to Burgdorf. In 1139 it was mentioned as the Upper Castle which implies that there was a Lower Castle nearby. In 1210 it was called castello Burgdorf.

In 1090, the Zähringens inherited the lands of Rheinfelder family when the last male heir died. In 1127, Duke Konrad of Zähringen received the Rectorate over much of Burgundy from Emperor Lothair III. With this authority, they began to accumulate lands and power. During this time the Zähringens founded a number of cities including Burgdorf. Under Duke Berthold V, in 1200, Burgdorf Castle was expanded. The old castle consisted of a gatehouse and attached wall. Berthold V added a tower, donjon and a hall that connected the two. The old market and town was north of the castle at the foot of the hill.

After the extinction of Zähringen line, Burgdorf passed to the Counts of Kyburg. Under the Kyburg or Neu-Kyburg Counts, Burgdorf Castle was the capital of the county, and the counts were the mayors of Burgdorf town. Under the Kyburgs, additional fortifications were added to the castle. The northern curtain wall was extended and two half-round towers were added. The eastern end and the western hall were built up and expanded. When the Kyburg line died out in 1264, the castle passed to Eberhard of Habsburg, who was married to Anna of Kyburg. Eberhard then became the Count of Neu-Kyburg.

In the 14th century, the Neu-Kyburgs became increasingly indebted. On 11 November 1382, Count Rudolf II of Neu-Kyburg launched a raid against the city of Solothurn to try to force the city to forgive his debts. For the city of Bern, this attack on an allied city represented an excellent opportunity for the city to break its ties with the Neu-Kyburgs. In March 1383 the Bernese-Solothurn army marched on Burgdorf. The army besieged the city for 45 days, but was unsuccessful. However, on 5 April 1384 the Neu-Kyburg counts were forced to sell the towns and castles of Burgdorf and Thun to Bern for 37,800 guilders in exchange for peace.

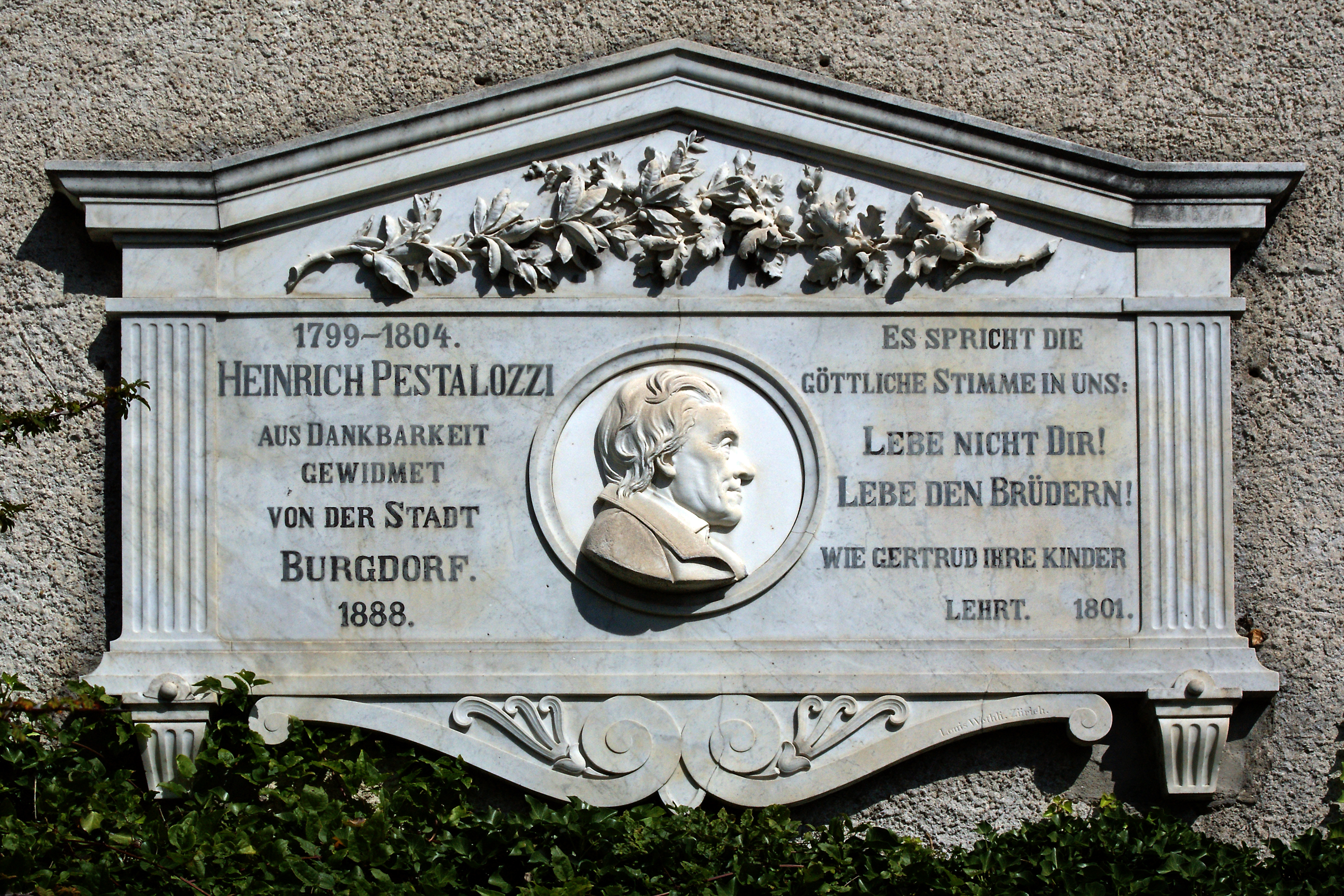
Plaque remembering Pestalozzi's school at the castle

After the Burgdorf war, the castle became the seat of the Bernese administrator. Under the Bernese administrator, the castle was again modified. The Kyburg additions to the large hall were demolished in 1540. A new gatehouse was built on the old foundations in 1559. A small stair tower was added in 1580 to the donjon. A new wing was added east of the courtyard in 1729, which contained both apartments and a granary.

During the 1798 French invasion and the creation of the Helvetic Republic, the last Bernese administrator, Rudolf of Erlach, worried that the castle would be plundered or burned. He moved all the government records to a nearby church. The castle was spared and the documents remained safe. Under the Helvetic Republic, the castle served, first, as a military hospital. Then, in 1800, the famous educator Heinrich Pestalozzi established a school in the castle. Only four years later, the cantonal administration took over the castle and converted it into government offices. In 1886 the castle was renovated and the Castle Museum opened in the so-called Knight's Hall.

== See also ==
- List of castles in Switzerland
