= List of mayors of Burgdorf =

Coat of arms of Burgdorf

This is a list of mayors of the city of Burgdorf, Canton of Bern, Switzerland. The Stadtpräsident chairs the Gemeinderat, the executive of Burgdorf.

Mayor (Stadtpräsident) of Burgdorf
Term	Mayor	Lifespan	Party	Notes
1920–1927	Jakob Keiser	(1852–1937)		
-1931	Emil Dietrich			
1932–1933	Hans Blumenstein	(1890–1949)		
1933–1949	Gottlieb Trachsel		FDP	
1949–1962	Franz Patzen	(1893-1971)	SPS/PSS	
1962–1963	Werner Lüthi		BGB	
1964–1970	Walter Graber		FDP	
1970–1978	Werner Lüthi		BGB	
1978–1991	Max Conrad	(born 1946)	LdU	
1992–1997	Peter Trachsel	(1925–2011)	independent	son of Gottlieb Trachsel
1998–2008	Franz Haldimann	(born 1941)	SVP, in 2008: BDP	
2009–present	Elisabeth Zäch	(born 1954)	SPS/PSS	
2016–present	Stefan Berger	(born)	SPS/PSS	
