= Burgdorf Steinhof railway station =

Railway station in Burgdorf, Switzerland

Burgdorf Steinhof
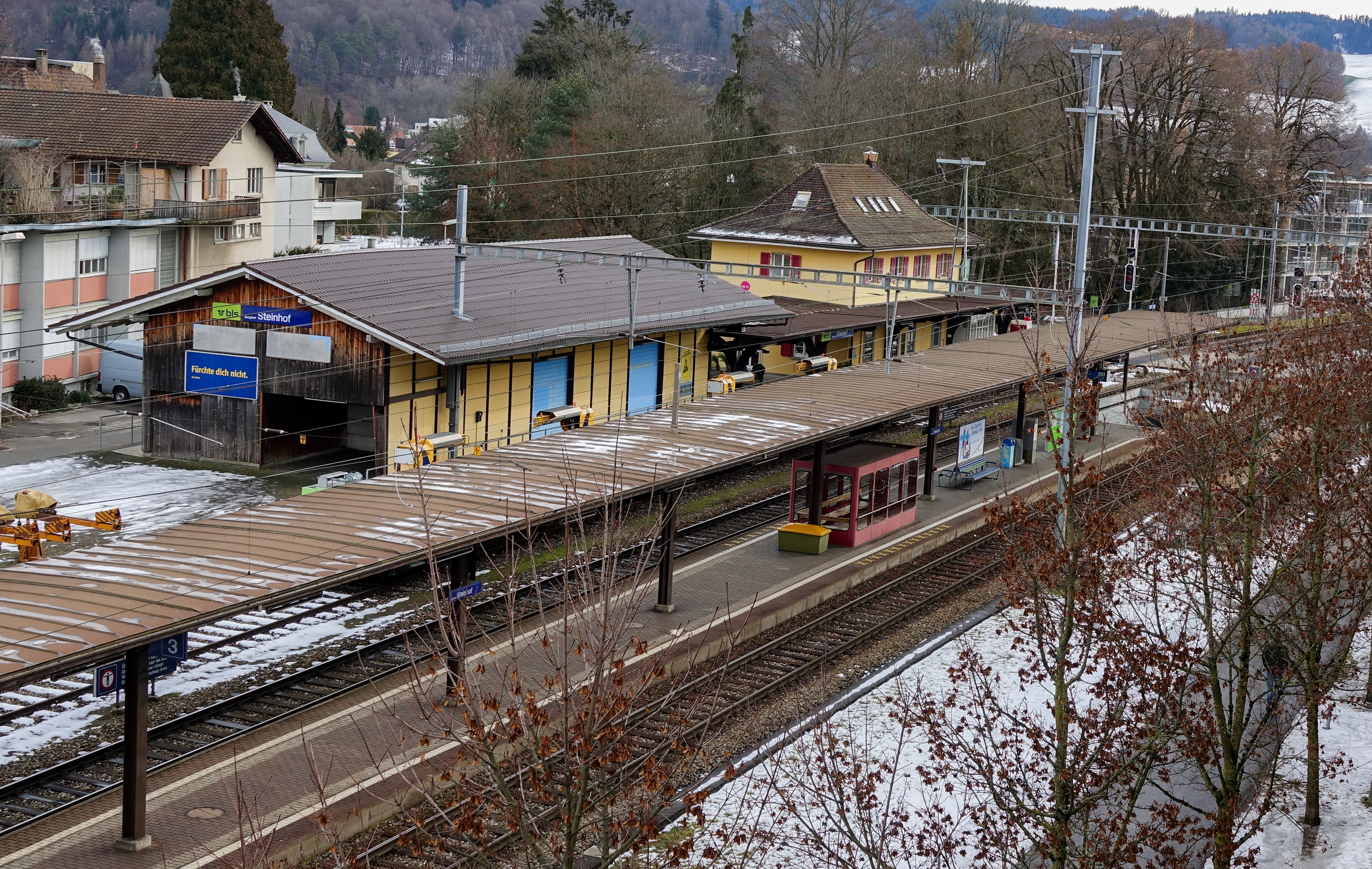
- The station in 2019, before the overhaul

General information
- Location: Burgdorf; Switzerland
- Coordinates: 47°03′07″N 7°37′05″E
- Elevation: 544 m (1,785 ft)
- Owner: BLS AG
- Lines: Burgdorf–Thun line; Solothurn–Langnau line
- Distance: 22.6 km (14.0 mi) from Solothurn
- Platforms: 2 side platforms
- Tracks: 2
- Train operators: BLS AG
- Connections: Busland AG buses

Construction
- Parking: Yes (32 spaces)
- Accessible: Yes

Other information
- Station code: 8508081 (BDFS)
- Fare zone: 150 (Libero)

History
- Rebuilt: Autumn 2019 – Summer 2021

Passengers
- 2023: 1'800 per weekday (BLS)

Services
Preceding station	Bern S-Bahn	Following station
Burgdorf towards Thun	S4	Oberburg towards Langnau i.E.
Burgdorf towards Solothurn	S41	Oberburg towards Thun
Burgdorf Terminus	S42 Limited service	Oberburg towards Thun
Burgdorf towards Thun	S44	Oberburg towards Sumiswald-Grünen
Location

Burgdorf Steinhof railway station (German: Bahnhof Burgdorf Steinhof) is a railway station in the municipality of Burgdorf, in the Swiss canton of Bern. It is an intermediate stop on the standard gauge Burgdorf–Thun and Solothurn–Langnau lines of BLS AG.

== Services ==
As of the December 2024 timetable change, the following services stop at Burgdorf Steinhof:

- Bern S-Bahn:
  - S4/S44: half-hourly service to Thun and hourly service to Langnau i.E. or Sumiswald-Grünen.
  - S41: hourly service between Thun and Solothurn.
  - S42: limited service between Burgdorf and Thun.
