= Annemarie Buchmann-Gerber =

Canadian artist

- Born: September 21, 1947; Burgdorf, Switzerland
- Died: December 23, 2015 (aged 68); Saskatoon, Saskatchewan
- Resting place: Oberburg, Switzerland
- Education: University of Saskatchewan
- Known for: Textile art
- Spouse: Heinz Buchmann

Annemarie Buchmann-Gerber (September 21, 1947 – December 23, 2015) was a Canadian artist known for her work with textiles and fiber materials. The subject matter of her work is based in feminism and contemporary issues.

== Education ==
Annemarie Buchnmann-Gerber had a five-year teaching certificate from Bern. Buchmann-Gerber took drawing and painting classes with George Glenn in Prince Albert. Afterward she completed a Bachelor of Fine Arts at the University of Saskatchewan.

== Career ==
Annemarie Buchmann-Gerber began her art career after meeting Margaret VanWalsem at the annual Winter Festival Exhibition in Prince Albert, Saskatchewan and George Glenn, who was the artist in residence in Prince Albert at the time. Buchmann-Gerber cited that George Glen was influential in her development. Buchmann-Garber's early work focused specifically on textiles and in particular on weaving and stitching to create tapestries. Buchmann-Gerber was one of the founding members of The Saskatchewan Craft Council. She was a board member for The Mendel Art Gallery and The Saskatchewan Craft Council.

Buchmann-Gerber died in Saskatoon and her ashes returned for burial in Oberburg, Switzerland.

== Sources ==
- "Annemarie Buchmann-Gerber Swastika Painted on Her House" http://www.pier21.ca/cd1/annemarie-buchmann-gerber Canadian Museum of Immigration at Pier 21. Retrieved 2016-26-02.
- (2016-01-02) "Annemarie Buchmann-Gerber" Saskatoon StarPhoenix. Retrieved 2016-26-02.
- "Premier's Prize presented to Annemarie Buchmann-Gerber" College of Arts & Sciences, University of Saskatchewan. Retrieved 2016-26-02.
