= Karl Eduard Aeschlimann =

Swiss architect (1808–1893)

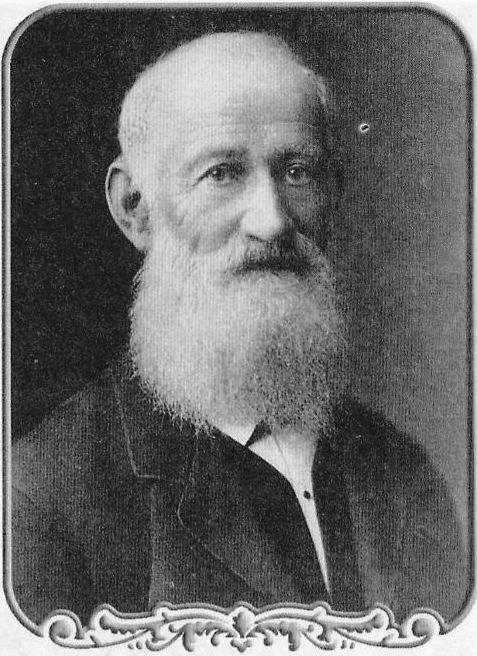
Karl Eduard Aeschlimann (1808-1893)

Karl Eduard Aeschlimann (17 February 1808 in Burgdorf – 4 April 1893 in Yalta) was a Swiss architect. He was a court architect of the Russian royal family.

Aeschlimann was a son of the potter Johann Heinrich Aeschlimann and his wife Marie. He attended the Burgerschulen in Burgdorf and the Académie des Beaux-Arts in Paris, and worked as assistant to architects in the city of Bern. In 1828, he traveled to the Black Sea and ended up in Crimea. He was a traveling companion of the Spanish Count Orlando de la Blanca. Between about 1830 to 1860 he worked as court architect of the Russian royal family on the south coast of Crimea, especially in the district of Greater Yalta. For this area, he created a general plan and designed a number of private and public buildings, including the first hotel of Yalta. Aeshlimann was involved in construction of the castle in Alupka for the Vorontsov family.

Aeschlimann married Elisa Maurer, a daughter of Johann Jakob Maurer-Fischer of Schaffhausen, in Simferopol in 1836 and was knighted in 1850.

== Literature ==
- Helena A. Aeschlimann: Die Burgdorfer Familie Aeschlimann in Russland. In: Burgdorfer Jahrbuch, 60 (1993), S. 59–89.
