= Christine Brand =

Swiss writer and journalist

- Born: 11 April 1973 (age 53); Burgdorf, Switzerland
- Occupations: Writer and journalist
- Website: christinebrand.ch

Christine Brand (born 11 April 1973, Burgdorf, Switzerland) is a Swiss writer and journalist.

== Life ==
Christine Brand grew up in Oberburg in Emmental. She completed her training as a teacher at the teachers' seminar in Langenthal. After an internship at the Berner Zeitung, she became editor there. From 1996 to 2004, she was editor and court reporter in the department "Canton" of the newspaper The Bund, starting in 2003 with reduced workloads. From 2003 to 2005, she was Correspondent for Canton and City of Bern of a pool of daily newspapers Basler Zeitung, Aargauer Zeitung, Southeastern Switzerland and St. Galler Tagblatt. In 2005, she completed an apprenticeship as a television journalist on the editorial board of the "Rundschau" of Swiss television, with two external internships at the Federal Parliament and in Geneva. From 2006 to 2008 she was editor of the "Rundschau". From June 2008 until the end of 2017, she was editor at the NZZ am Sonntag in the section "Background and Opinions".

In 2013 she was awarded the Media Prize of the Swiss Bar Association for a court report. For a report on family killings, she received the media prize of SRG SSR idée suisse. She teaches courses in journalism at the EB Zürich.

After being signed by Blanvalet publisher of the Random House Publishing, Brand became a self-employed writer in 2017.

Brand is a member of the associations Autorengruppe deutschsprachige Kriminalliteratur – Das Syndikat and Authors of Switzerland. She lives in Zürich and in Zanzibar.

== Publications ==
=== Milla Nova / Sandro Bandini series ===
- Todesstrich, Landverlag, Langnau 2009, ISBN 978-3-9523520-3-8
  Revised edition: Atlantis Verlag, Zürich 2023, ISBN 978-3-7152-5512-5
- Das Geheimnis der Söhne, Landverlag, Langnau 2010, ISBN 978-3-9523520-7-6
  Revised edition: Atlantis Verlag, Zürich 2023, ISBN 978-3-7152-5502-6
- Kalte Seelen, Atlantis, Zürich 2013, ISBN 978-3-7152-5006-9
  Revised edition: Atlantis Verlag, Zürich 2022, ISBN 978-3-7152-5006-9
- Stiller Hass, Landverlag, Langnau 2015, ISBN 978-3-905980-25-7
  Revised edition: Atlantis, Zürich 2022, ISBN 978-3-7152-5005-2
- Blind, Blanvalet, München 2019, ISBN 978-3-7341-0620-0
- Die Patientin, Blanvalet München 2020, ISBN 978-3-7341-1047-4
- Der Bruder, Blanvalet, München 2021, ISBN 978-3-7645-0745-9
- Der Unbekannte, Blanvalet, München 2022, ISBN 978-3-7645-0770-1
- Der Feind, Blanvalet, München 2023, ISBN 978-3-7645-0771-8

=== Malou Löwenberg series ===
The protagonist of this series is police officer Malou Löwenberg, who starts her own business as a private investigator.

- Vermisst – Der Fall Anna. Blanvalet, München 2024, ISBN 978-3-7645-0828-9.
- Vermisst – Der Fall Emily. Blanvalet, München 2025, ISBN 978-3-7645-0880-7.
- Vermisst – Der Fall Lucas. Blanvalet, München 2026, ISBN 978-3-7645-0963-7.

=== Short stories ===
- Späte Rache, Landverlag, Langnau 2008, ISBN 978-3-03301577-7
- Lochbach-Geist, Landverlag, Langnau 2009, ISBN 978-3-9523520-1-4
- Tod am Napf, Landverlag, Langnau 2012, ISBN 978-3-905980-08-0
- Toter Hund, Gmeiner, Messkirch 2013, ISBN 978-3-8392-1381-0
- Grüngesprenkelte Augen, Vidal Verlag, Winterthur 2014, ISBN 978-3-9523734-7-7
- Totes Vieh, Landverlag, Langnau 2015, ISBN 978-3-905980-26-4
- Im Ameisenhaufen, Appenzeller Verlag, Schwellbrunn 2016, ISBN 978-3-85882-736-4

=== Other ===
- Schattentaten: wahre Kriminalgeschichten ans Licht gebracht, Stämpfli, Bern 2008, ISBN 3-7272-1300-0
- Heimliche Touristenattraktion. In: David Aebi (ed.): Burgdorf. Nabel der Welt mit stolzer Geschichte. Kulturbuchverlag, Burgdorf 2009, ISBN 978-3-9523304-9-4, p. 7–9
- Mond: Geschichten aus aller Welt, Unionsverlag, Zürich 2016, ISBN 978-3-293-00498-6
- Bis er gesteht, Kampa Verlag, Zürich 2021, ISBN 978-3-311-12038-4
- Wahre Verbrechen: Die dramatischsten Fälle einer Gerichtsreporterin, Blanvalet, München 2021, ISBN 978-3-7645-0784-8
- Wahre Verbrechen: Die erschütterndsten Fälle einer Gerichtsreporterin, Blanvalet, München 2023, ISBN 978-3-7645-0829-6
- Späte Rache. Dreizehn Kurzkrimis. Atlantis, Zürich 2024, ISBN 978-3-7152-5523-1
