= Fritz Hofmann (politician) =

Swiss politician (1924–2005)

Fritz Hofmann

Fritz Hofmann (4 March 1924 in Engelburg, St. Gallen, Switzerland – 24 May 2005 in Burgdorf, Switzerland) was a Swiss politician. From 1962 to 1987, he was a member of the National Council. He served as the president of the Swiss People's Party (SVP) from 1976 to 1984.

Hofmann graduated from schools in Gossau and St. Gallen. He lived in Burgdorf and had two children. Professionally, he was a graduate engineer agronomist at ETH Zurich. From 1953 to 1967 he made a career in the Butterzentrale Burgdorf. He was then the director of the Central Association of Swiss Milk Producers (1968–1987). Later he served as president of the Berner Kantonalbank.

Hofmann in 1962 was elected to the Grand Council of the Canton of Bern and in 1971 to the National Council, where he served until 1987. From 1976 to 1984 he was the president of the Swiss People's Party.

Hofmann died in Burgdorf on 24 May 2005 at the age of 81.
