= Burgdorf, Switzerland =

Burgdorf
- Municipality
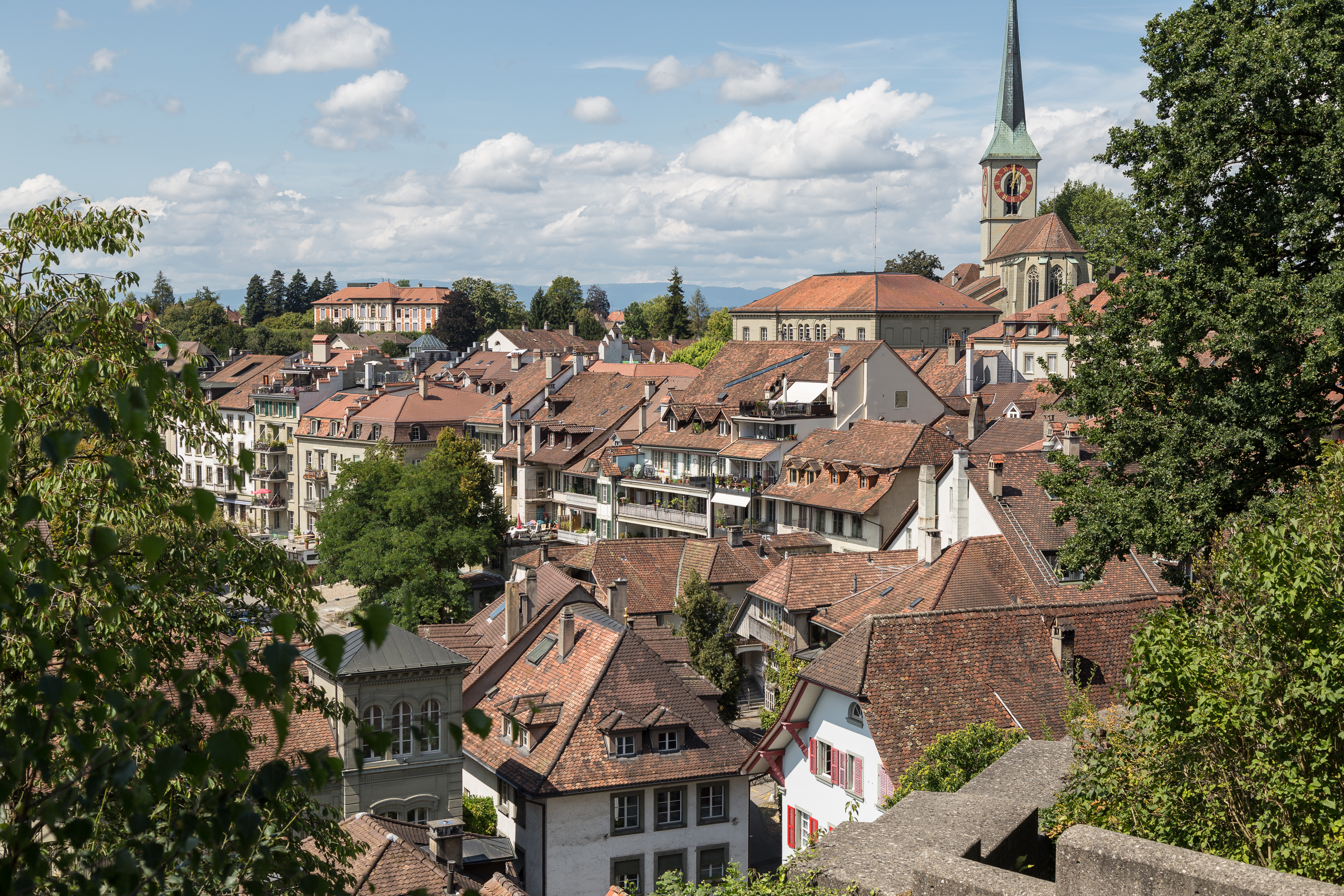
- Old city of Burgdorf

- Flag Coat of arms
- Location of Burgdorf
- Location within Switzerland Location within Canton of Bern
- Coordinates: 47°03′N 7°37′E
- Country: Switzerland
- Canton: Bern
- District: Emmental

Government
  - Executive: Gemeinderat with 7 members
  - Mayor: Stadtpräsident (list); Stefan Berger SPS/PSS (as of 2026)
  - Parliament: Stadtrat with 40 members

Area
  - Total: 15.61 km^{2} (6.03 sq mi)
- Elevation: 533 m (1,749 ft)

Population (December 2020)
  - Total: 16,583
  - Density: 1,062/km^{2} (2,751/sq mi)
- Time zone: UTC+01:00 (CET)
  - Summer (DST): UTC+02:00 (CEST)
- Postal code: 3400
- SFOS number: 404
- ISO 3166 code: CH-BE
- Surrounded by: Hasle bei Burgdorf, Heimiswil, Kirchberg, Krauchtal, Lyssach, Mötschwil, Oberburg, Rüti bei Lyssach, Wynigen
- Twin towns: Epesses (Switzerland), Burgdorf (Germany), San Pellegrino Terme (Italy)
- Website: https://www.burgdorf.ch

Burgdorf (Swiss Standard German pronunciation: [ˈbʊrɡˌdɔrf]; French: Berthoud [bɛʁtu]; High Alemannic: Bùùrdlef) is a municipality and the largest town in the Emmental in the canton of Bern in Switzerland. It was the capital of the district of the same name until 2010, when it became part of the new Emmental district.

== Name ==
The city is named Burgdorf in German, and Berthoud in French (which is not a literal translation of Burgdorf). The city is named Berthoud in memorial of Berchthold V. Duke of Zähringen who added a plaque to the city entrance for his victory against the Burgundese. A Latinized form of Burgdorf is known as Castrovilla, but a Villa Berchtoldi or similar has not been found to date.

== History ==
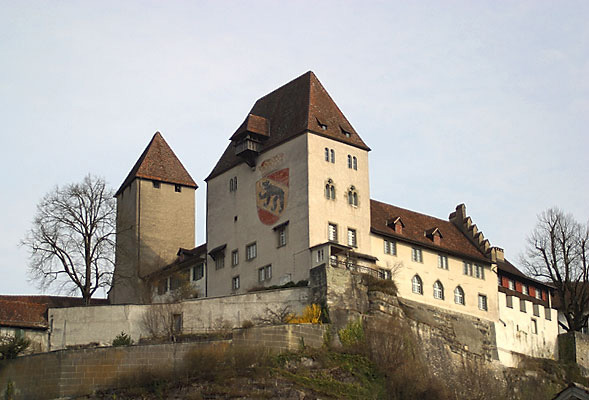
The Burgdorf castle, first built in 1175, now contains a museum founded in 1886.

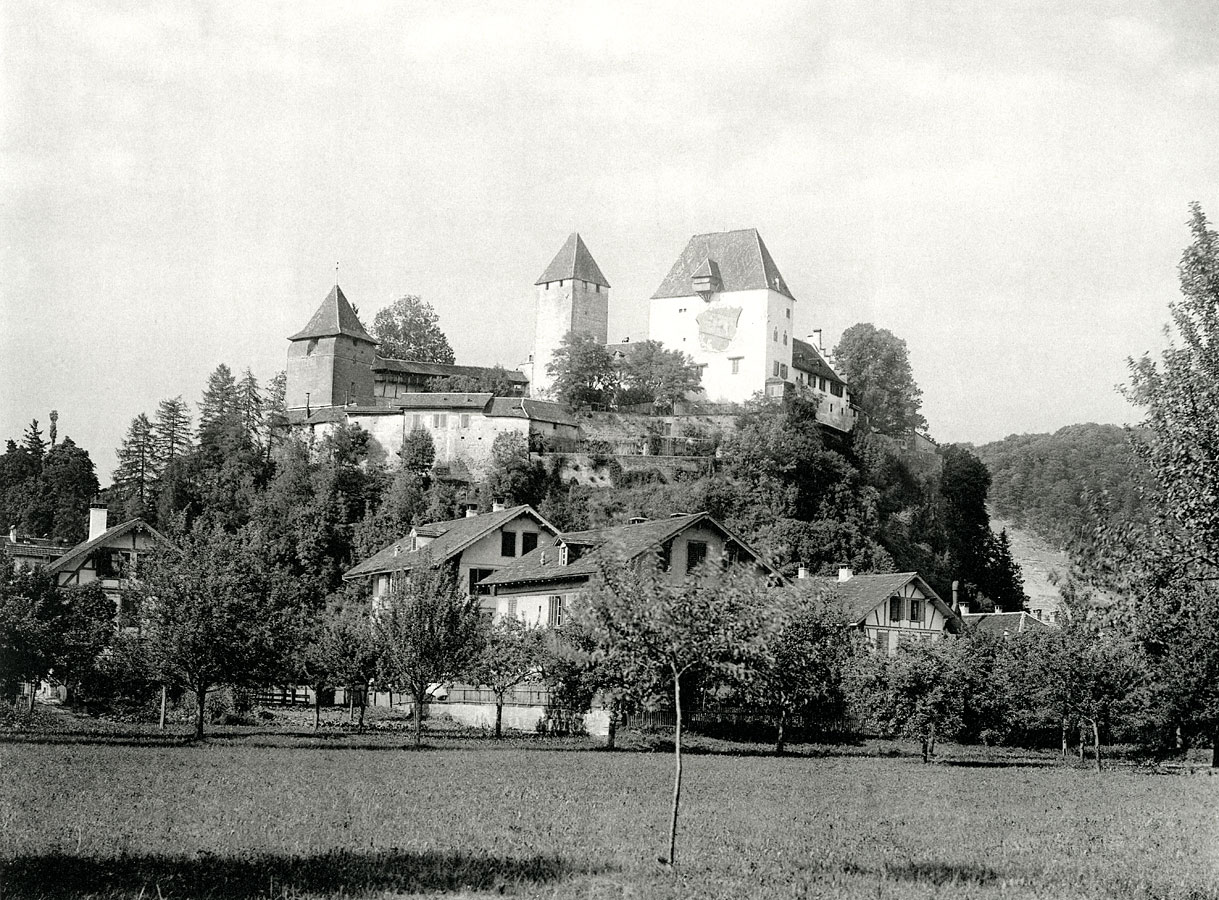
Burgdorf castle in 1895

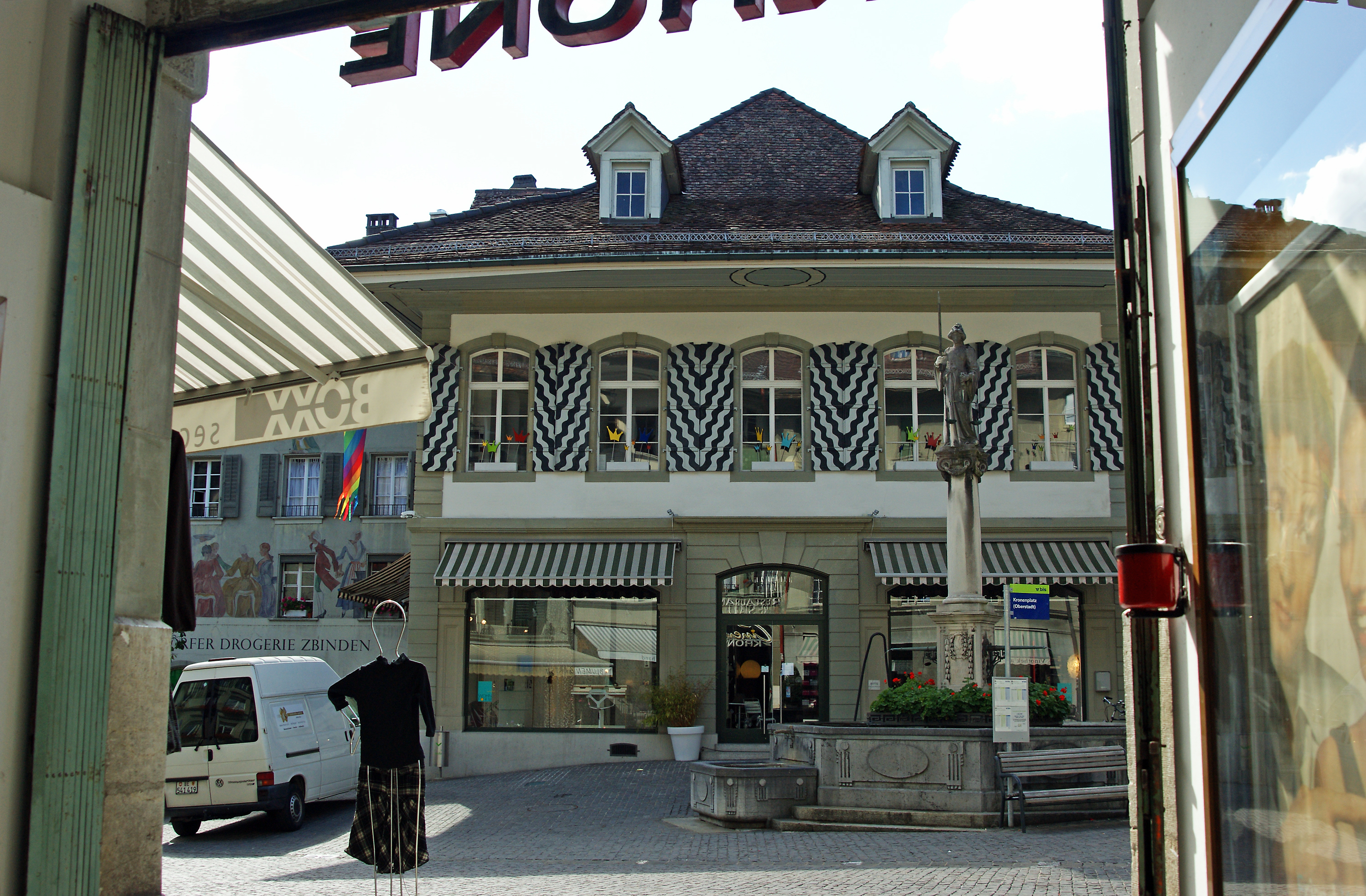
Kronenplatz in Burgdorf, part of the old city

Scattered archeological finds indicate that the area around Burgdorf was already inhabited during the Neolithic era, the Late Bronze Age and the Celtic Hallstatt and La Tène eras.

During the High Middle Ages the land that would become Burgdorf was owned by the Kingdom of Burgundy and then after 1080 by the Dukes of Zähringen. Either the kings or the dukes built a castle on the left bank of the Emme river. Burgdorf is first mentioned in 1236 as in oppido Burchtorff, while Burgdorf Castle is mentioned in 1080 as castellum Bertoldi ducis. The Zähringen dukes built a city (upper-west city section) around the castle in the last quarter of the 12th century. After the extinction of the Zähringen line, Burgdorf passed to the Counts of Kyburg. They expanded the city in 1278 with the upper-east section and between 1278 and 1300 absorbed the Holzbrunnen settlement which became the lower town. By 1300 the city had expanded to fill the town walls. Starting in 1323 there was a ban on construction within the walls, which marked the border of the city until 1800. Under the Kyburg or Neu-Kyburg Counts, Burgdorf Castle was the capital of the county, and the Counts were the mayors of Burgdorf town.

In the 14th century, the Neu-Kyburgs became increasingly indebted. On 11 November 1382, Count Rudolf II of Neu-Kyburg, launched a raid against the city of Solothurn to try and force the city to forgive his debts. For the city of Bern, this attack on an allied city represented an excellent opportunity for the city to break its ties with the Neu-Kyburgs. In March 1383 the Bernese-Solothurn army marched on Burgdorf. This army was supported with troops from the Forest Cantons, Lucerne, Zürich, Neuchâtel and Savoy and were armed with catapults and primitive guns. Because Count Rudolf II had died before the war began, Burgdorf was defended by Rudolf's uncle, Berchtold I. Under Berchtold, Burgdorf withstood a 45-day siege. An attempt to negotiate a cease-fire on 21 April 1383, between Bern and the citizens of Burgdorf against the Neu-Kyburgs was also unsuccessful. Beset by the enormous burdens of war and civil unrest at home, the Bernese Council sought Confederation mediation to end the war. On 5 April 1384, the Neu-Kyburgs agreed to sell the towns and castles of Burgdorf and Thun to Bern for 37,800 guilders.

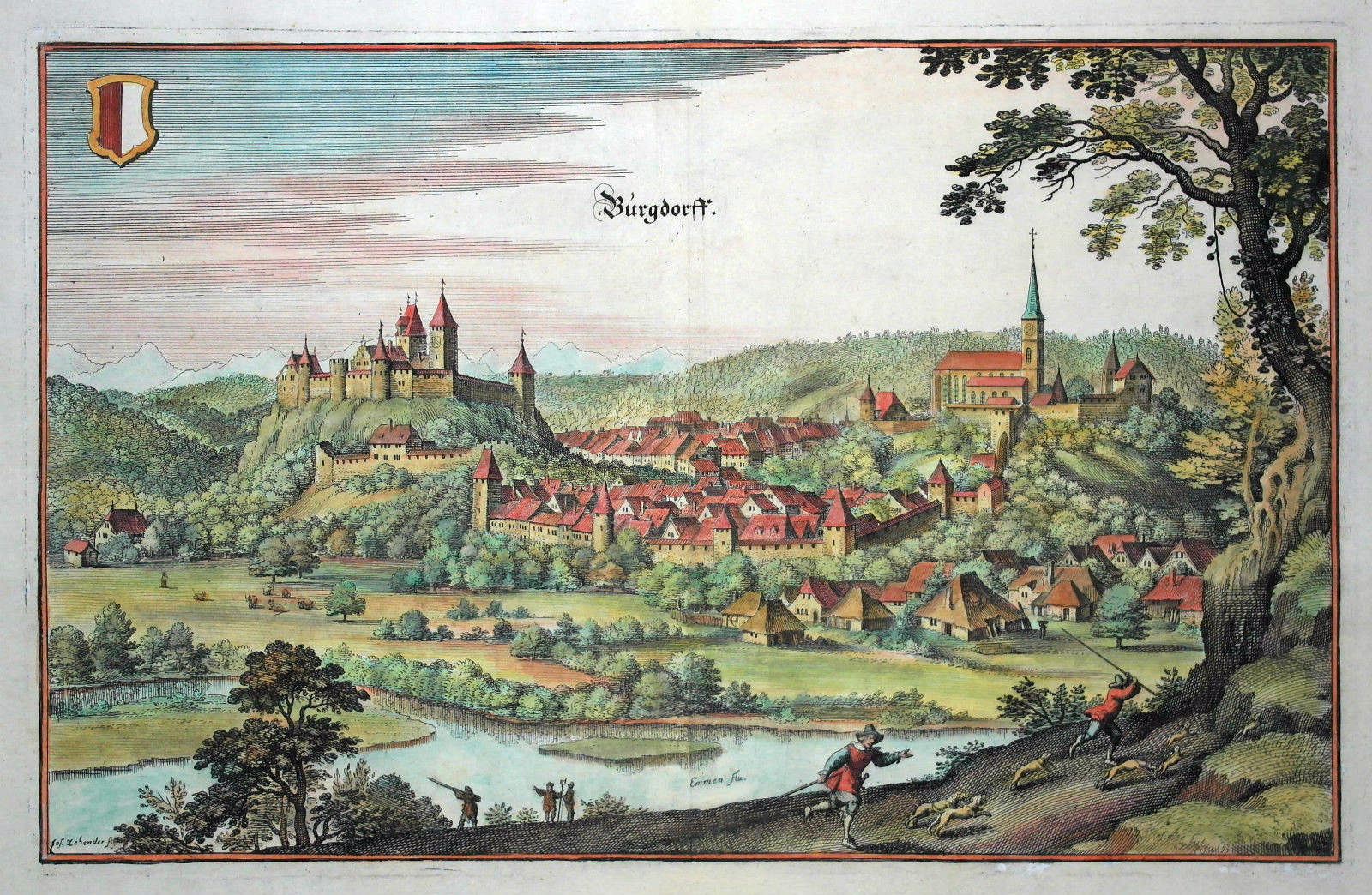
Coloured version of Burgdorff by Merian 1650

As part of the peace treaty, Bern acknowledged the rights and privileges that the Kyburgs had granted to Burgdorf. Burgdorf enjoyed a unique amount of autonomy compared to the other cities in the Bernese city-state. The town had its own mayor, council and high and low courts. Starting in 1394 the town began to buy courts, land and forests from the impoverished nobility. It began to acquire the surrounding villages and towns as well. In 1394 Rütschelen came under Burgdorf's authority. This was followed in 1395 by Grasswil, 1400 by Wil (now part of Rütschelen), 1402 by Inkwil (until 1720), 1423 by Niederösch, 1429 by Bettenhausen, 1429 and 1509/10 Thörigen, 1431 by Gutenburg and Lotzwil, 1435 by Kleindietwil and at the start of the 16th century Oberösch. The city created the bailiwicks of Grasswil (Grasswil, Ösch, Heimiswil) and Lotzwil (Thörigen, Lotzwil) under the administration of an alderman.

The city government consisted of a small council (12 members) and a large council (32 members) Starting in 1384 the Schultheiss was chosen by Bern. The small council was proposed by Burgdorf and approved by Bern, while the large council was appointed by the small council. By the 15th century, Burgdorf had about 900 residents which made it larger than most of the surrounding towns. The main industry remained agriculture until about 1798. Trade remained mostly regional and the products of the local industry (tannery, wool and linen weaving) only sold in the nearby region. Until the late 15th century, the town had a few guilds which remained without political or social power. They were mostly responsible for a few city obligations including supervising the fire and security watches. There were five guild houses in the upper city (blacksmiths-carpenters, butchers-shoemakers, bakers, weavers and tailors), one in the lower town (tanners). Each guild consisted of several trades, for example the blacksmiths-carpenters, allowed craftsmen working in 22 different jobs involving iron, stone and wood processing to join.

The economic growth in the 15th century enabled the city to build municipal buildings and maintain the fortifications and public areas. The city hall, church and market were all built or expanded during this time. However, starting in the 1460s and 1470s the economy began to stagnate. The guilds gradually became more powerful and began to choke the economy. In the 16th century, the economies of the surrounding villages began to grow unfettered by guild rules. The guild controlled markets of Burgdorf attempted to compete with these small markets by banning the import of goods from the surrounding countryside. These bans (in 1619 and again in 1666–74) only served to undermined Burgdorf's position as a regional market and service center. Burgdorf remained hostile to new businesses and in some cases drove them to settle in neighboring towns.

With the construction of the road on Kirchberg (1756–64) Burgdorf was no longer on any regional trade routes. The devastating fires (1706 upper town and in 1715 in the lower town) forced the city council to rebuild much of the city. Overall, the population stagnated and after 1655 it became increasingly hard to gain citizenship in Burgdorf. The percentage of non-citizen residents who could become citizens was less than 40% in 1764. As the number of artisans had declined, there were fewer and fewer families for that could serve on the town councils. At times, the large council only had 27 members instead of 32, due to a lack of candidates. During the Swiss peasant war of 1653 the city remained loyal to Bern. While they feared an attack by the peasant armies, Burgdorf was bypassed. The invasion of the French in 1798 and the forced reforms of the Helvetic Republic demolished much of the traditional, conservative power structure and privilege in Burgdorf.

== Geography ==
Aerial view by Walter Mittelholzer (1925)

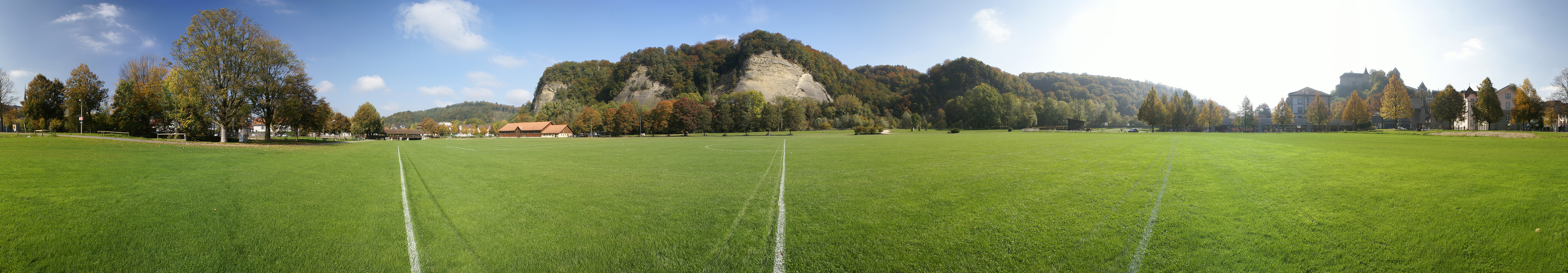
Panorama of the Schützenmatte near Burgdorf

Burgdorf has an area, as of 2014, of 15.56 km^{2} (6.01 sq mi). Of this area, 3.78 km^{2} (1.46 sq mi) or 24.3% is used for agricultural purposes, while 6.33 km^{2} (2.44 sq mi) or 40.7% is forested. Of the rest of the land, 5.03 km^{2} (1.94 sq mi) or 32.3% is settled (buildings or roads), 0.41 km^{2} (0.16 sq mi) or 2.6% is either rivers or lakes and 0.05 km^{2} (12 acres) or 0.3% is unproductive land.

Of the built up area, industrial buildings made up 6.2% of the total area while housing and buildings made up 15.6% and transportation infrastructure made up 7.5%. while parks, green belts and sports fields made up 2.2%. 39.8% of the total land area is heavily forested. Of the agricultural land, 16.6% is used for growing crops and 7.1% is pastures. All the water in the municipality is in rivers and streams.

== Coat of arms ==
The blazon of the municipal coat of arms is Per pale Sable and Argent all within a Border Or.

== Demographics ==
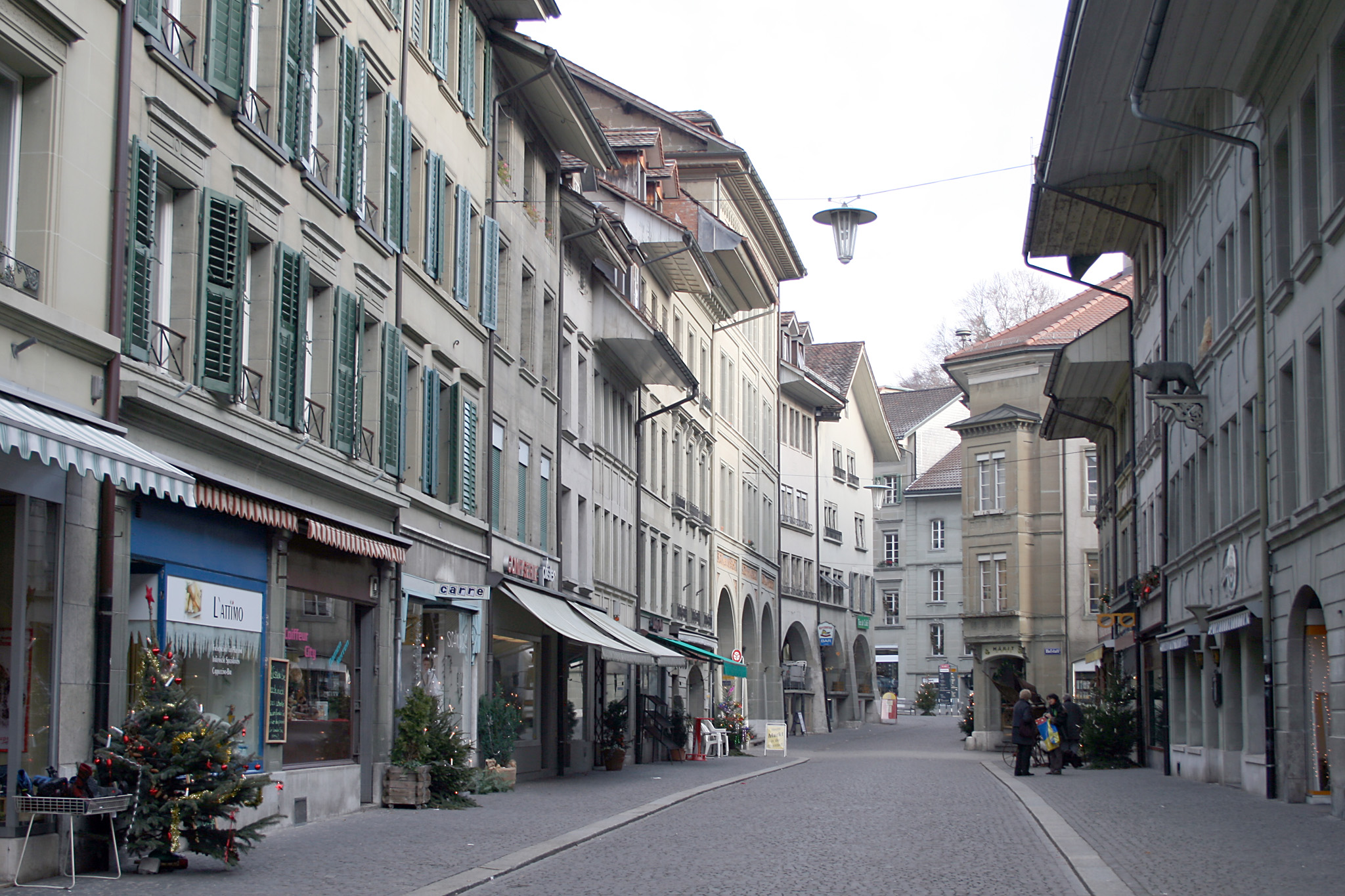
Old City of Burgdorf

Burgdorf has a population (as of December 2020) of 16,583. As of 2010, 12.9% of the population are resident foreign nationals. Over the last 10 years (2000–2010) the population has changed at a rate of 5.2%. Migration accounted for 6.6%, while births and deaths accounted for -1.1%.

Most of the population (as of 2000) speaks Swiss-German (13,088 or 88.9%) as their first language, Italian is the second most common (402 or 2.7%) and Albanian is the third (219 or 1.5%). There are 116 people who speak French and 8 people who speak Romansh.

As of 2008, the population was 48.3% male and 51.7% female. The population consisted of 6,335 Swiss men (41.2% of the population) and 1,083 (7.0%) non-Swiss men. There were 7,051 Swiss women (45.9%) and 905 (5.9%) non-Swiss women. Of the population in the municipality, 4,260 or about 29.0% were born in Burgdorf and lived there in 2000. There were 5,462 or 37.1% who were born in the same canton, while 2,176 or 14.8% were born somewhere else in Switzerland, and 2,352 or 16.0% were born outside of Switzerland.

As of 2000, children and teenagers (0–19 years old) make up 21.2% of the population, while adults (20–64 years old) make up 59.7% and seniors (over 64 years old) make up 19.2%.

As of 2000, there were 5,932 people who were single and never married in the municipality. There were 6,856 married individuals, 1,067 widows or widowers and 859 individuals who are divorced.

As of 2000, there were 6,637 private households in the municipality, and an average of 2.1 persons per household. There were 2,567 households that consist of only one person and 353 households with five or more people. In 2000, a total of 6,507 apartments (91.9% of the total) were permanently occupied, while 371 apartments (5.2%) were seasonally occupied and 199 apartments (2.8%) were empty. As of 2009, the construction rate of new housing units was 2.5 new units per 1000 residents. The vacancy rate for the municipality, in 2010, was 1.85%.

== Historic population ==
The historical population is given in the following chart:

Historic population data
Year	Total population	German-speaking	French-speaking	Protestant	Catholic	Other	No religion given	Swiss	Non-Swiss
1764	1,225								
1798	1,295								
1850	3,636							3,485	151
1880	6,581	6,443	65	6,256	289	11		6,226	355
1910	9,367	9,131	122	8,765	521	23		8,899	468
1930	9,772	9,535	146	9,087	621	32		9,489	283
1950	11,586	11,188	215	10,628	880	130		11,309	277
1970	15,888	13,856	175	12,882	2,809	463		13,813	2,075
1990	15,373	13,494	131	11,328	2,241	1,086		13,305	2,068
2000	14,714	13,088	116	9,934	1,993	1,100		12,404	2,310

== Heritage sites of national significance ==
The entire old city, the former Grosse Apotheke and Diesbacher House, the former Mädchenschule (Girls' School), the former Niederspital (Hospital), the Gehöft Grafenscheuren, the Grosshaus (Large House) at Hohengasse 4 / Kronenplatz 4, the House zum Ochsen at Hohengasse 35, the Villa Schnell, the Kantonales Technikum (College), the Leinenweberei (Linen Spinning Plant) Schmid with Villa, the Museum Franz Gertsch, the Swiss Reformed City Church, the Sammlung Historisches Armeematerial Collection of Historical Military Equipment, which is shared between Thun, Burgdorf and Dübendorf in Zurich), Castle, the Quarantine House and Chapel and the Villa Roth are listed as Swiss heritage site of national significance The entire town of Burgdorf is part of the Inventory of Swiss Heritage Sites.

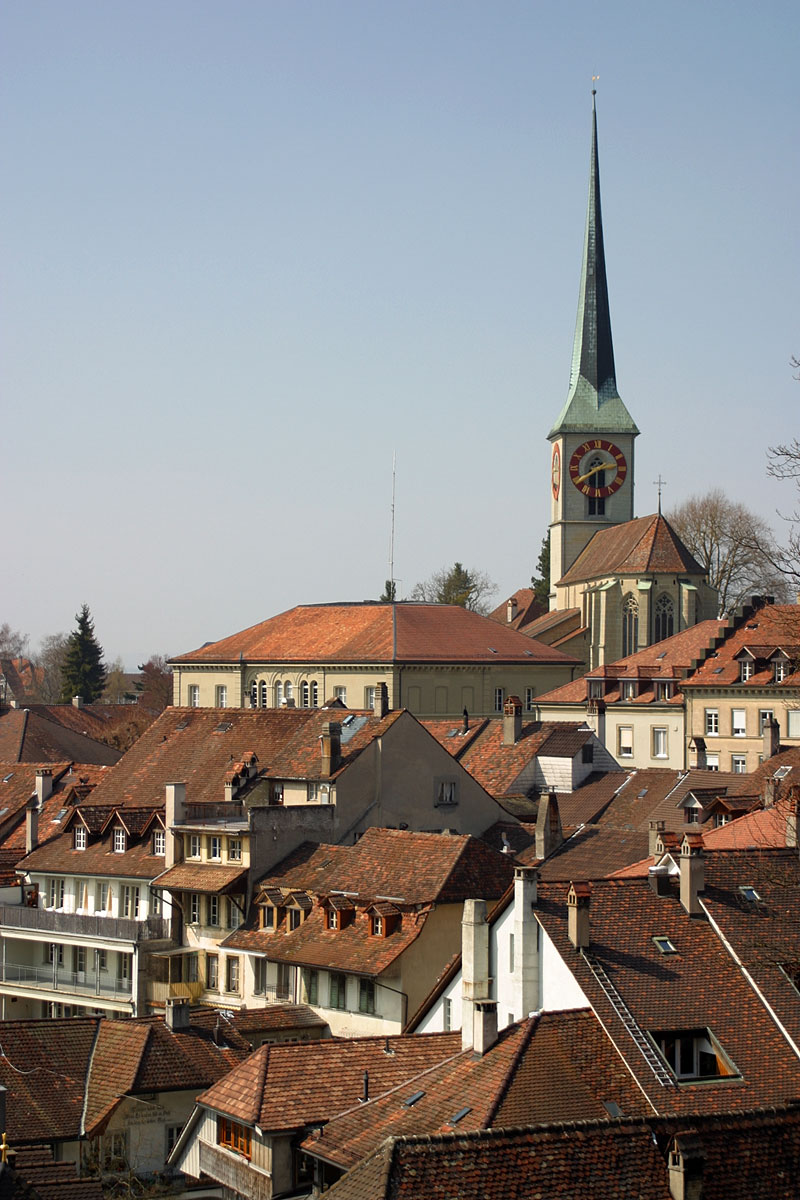
Altstadt, Medieval and Early Modern City and Castle

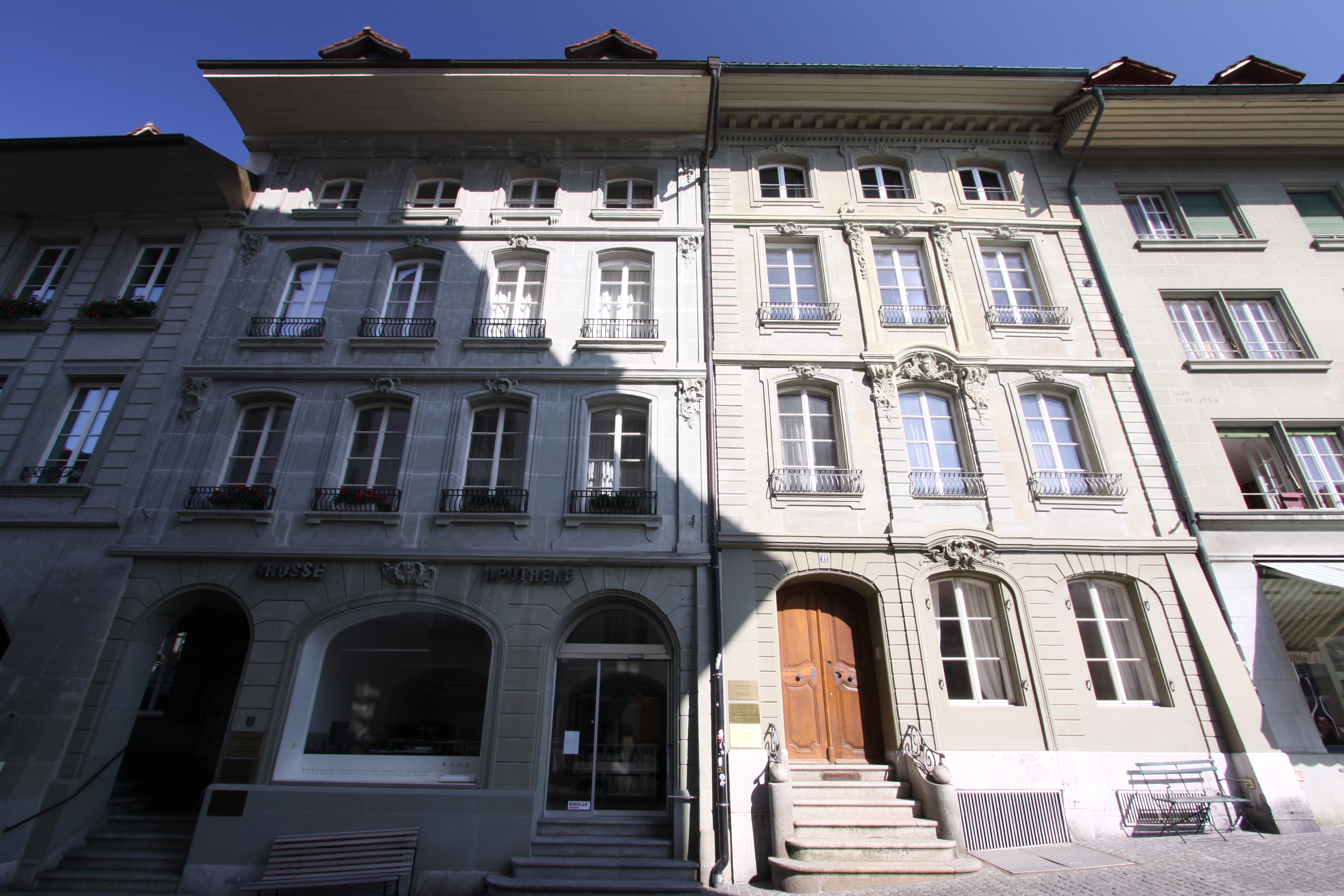
Former Grosse Apotheke and Diesbacher House

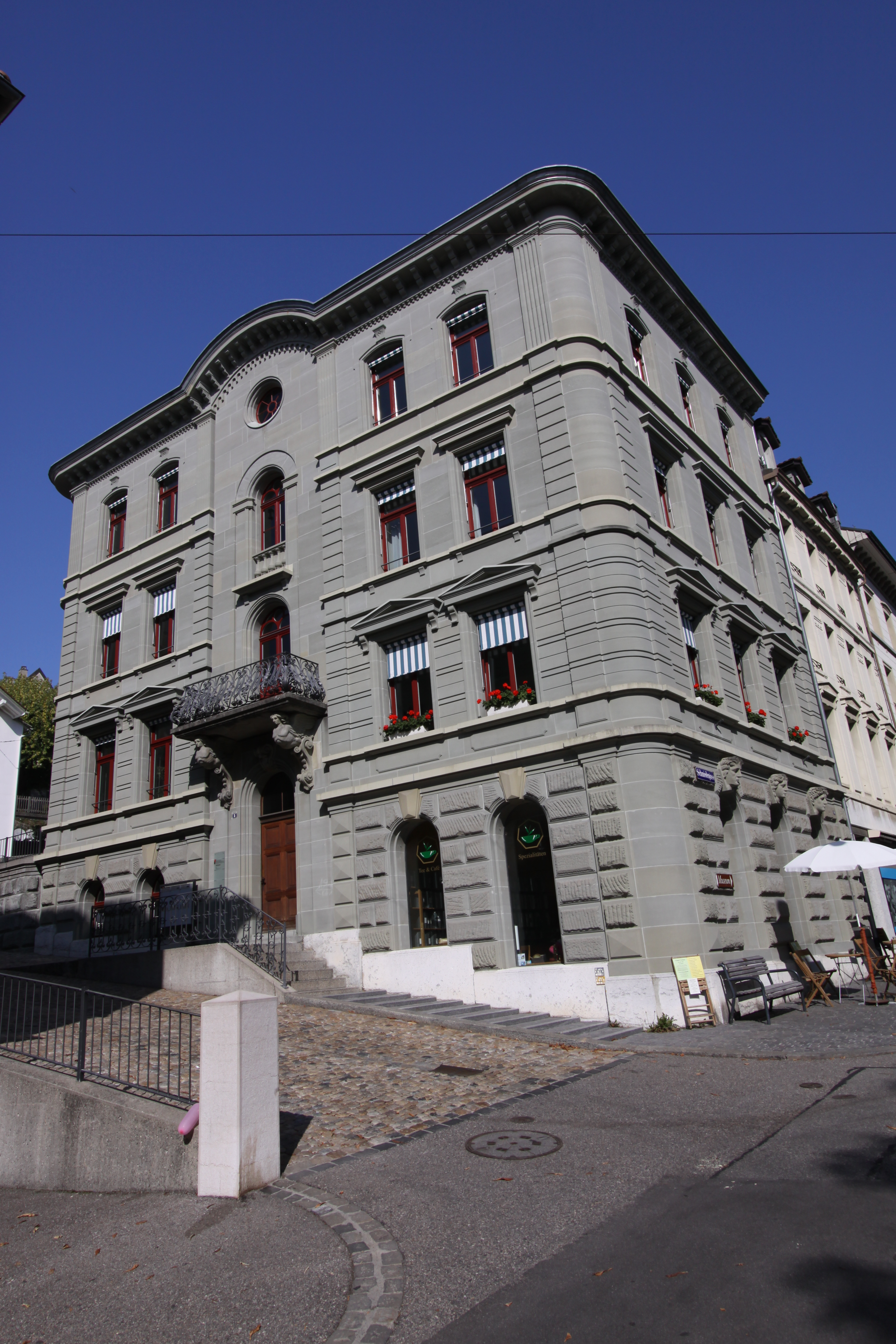
Former Mädchenschule (Girls' School)

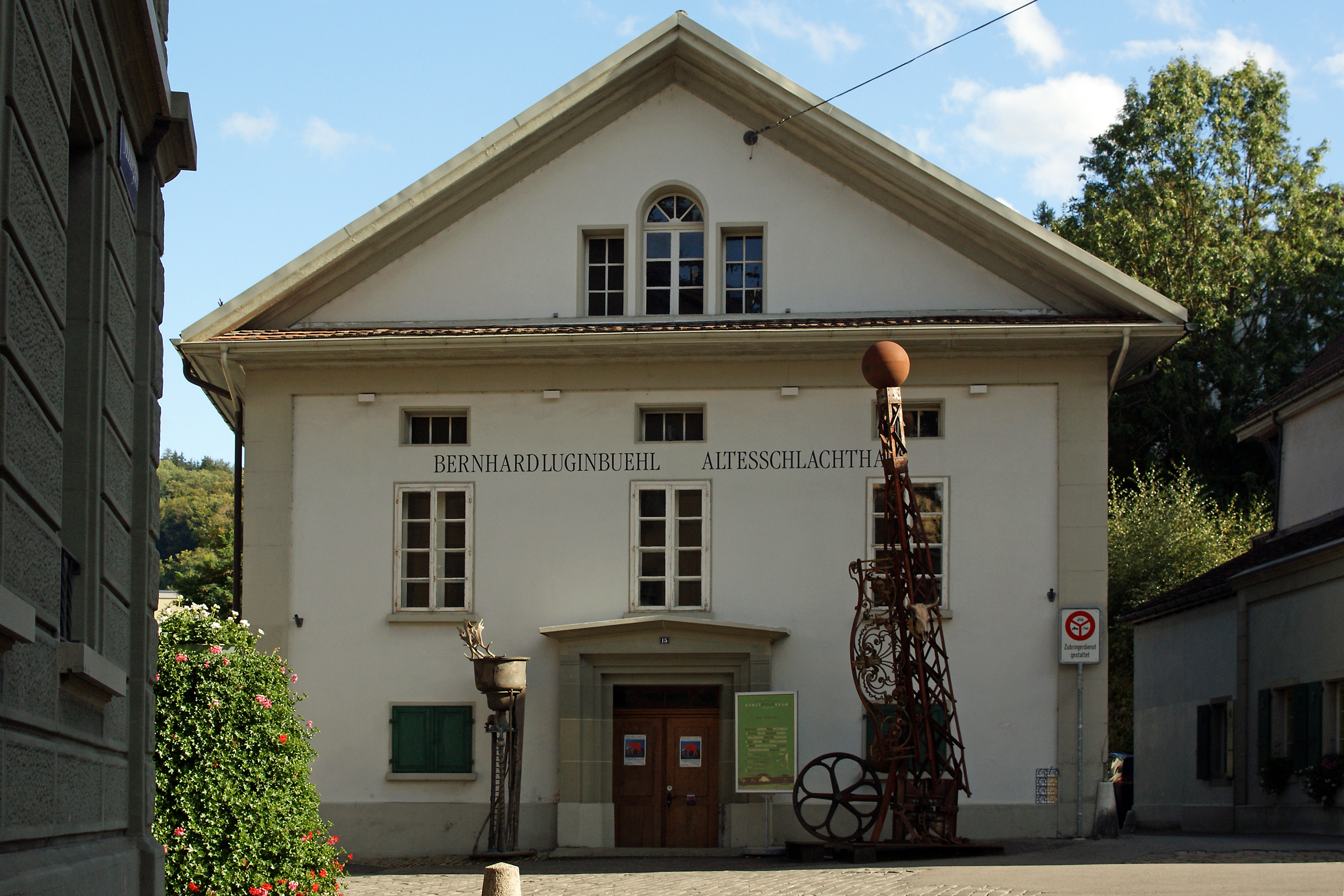
Former Niederspital (Hospital)

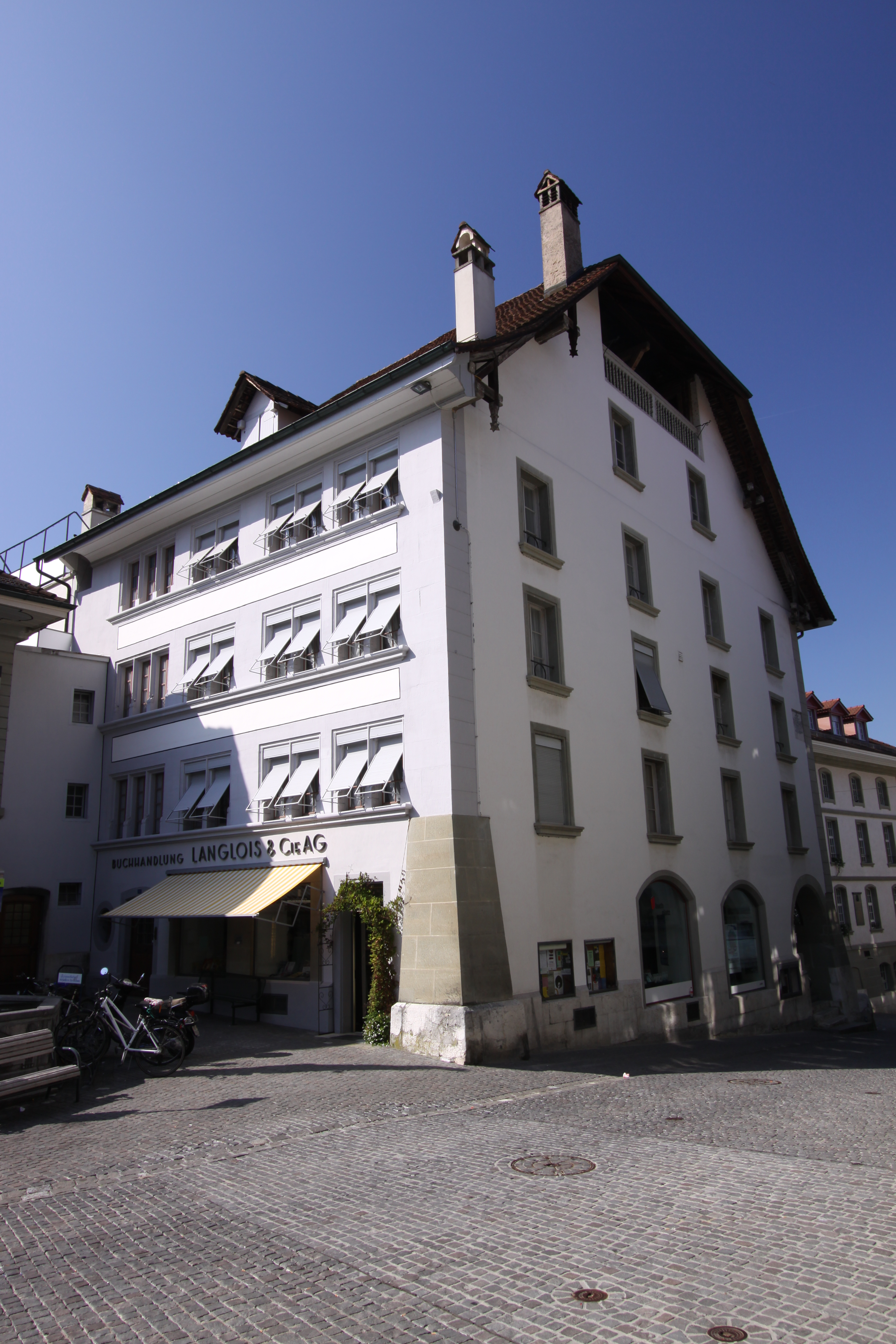
Grosshaus (Large House)

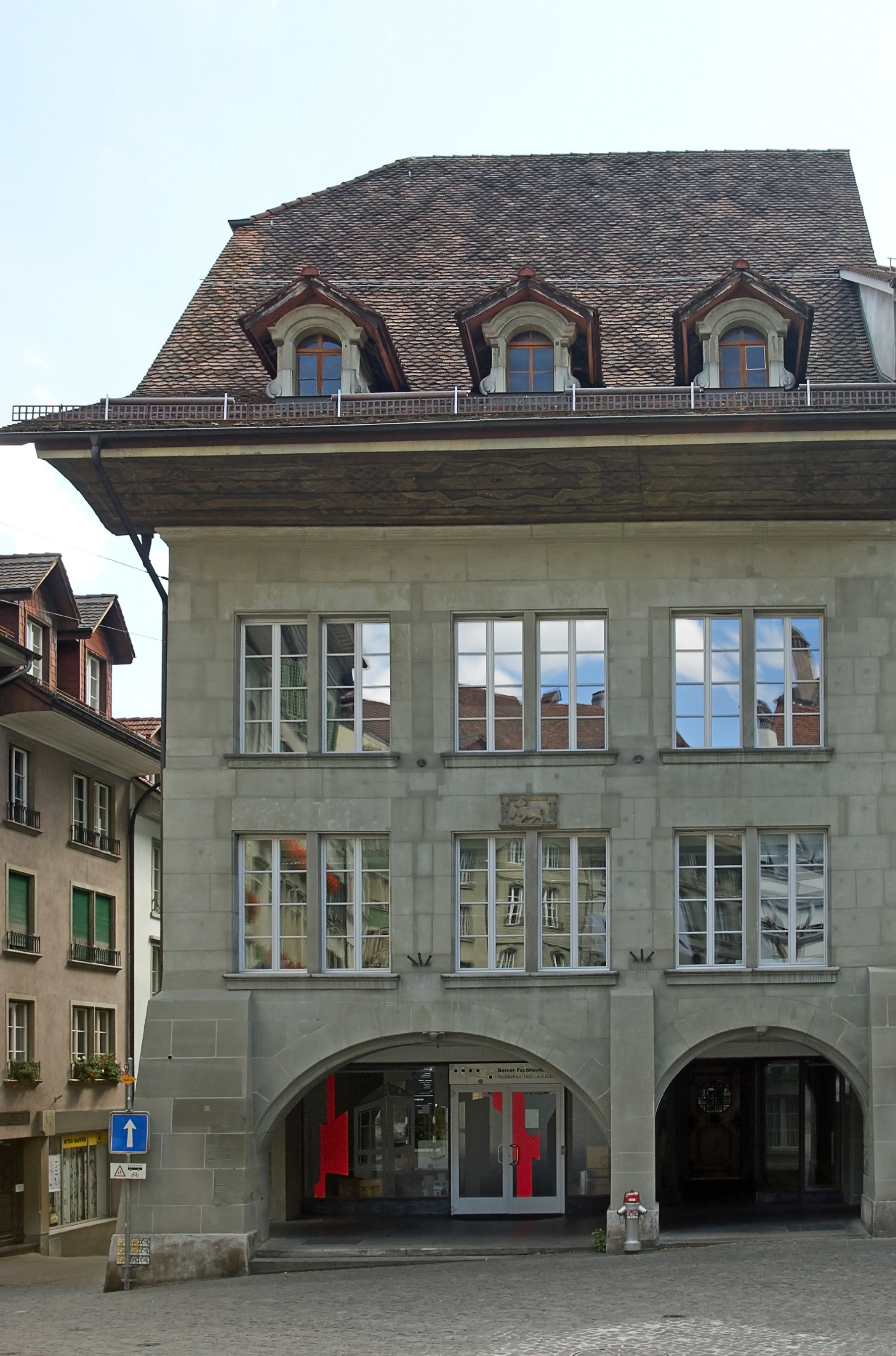
House zum Ochsen

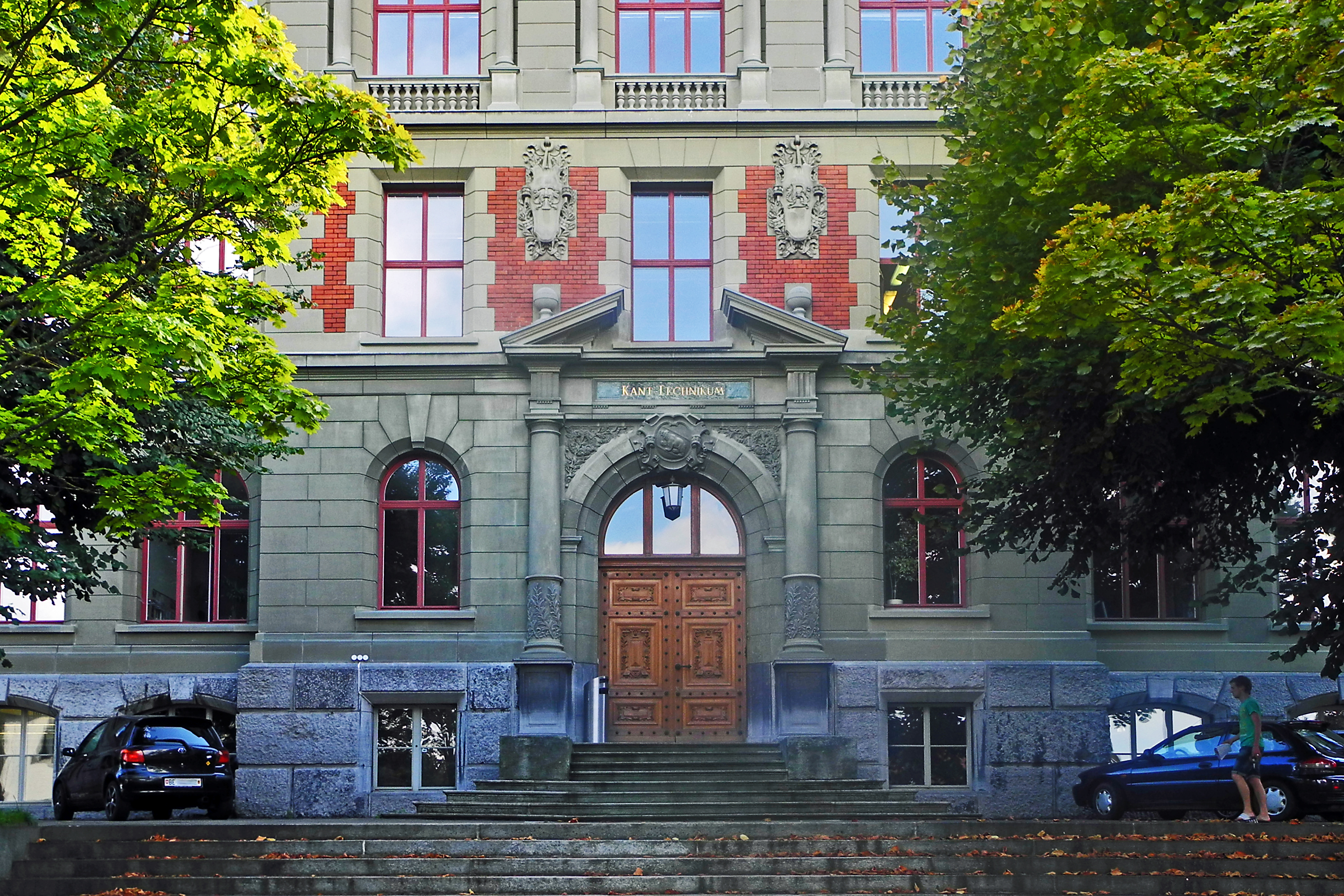
Kantonales Technikum (College)

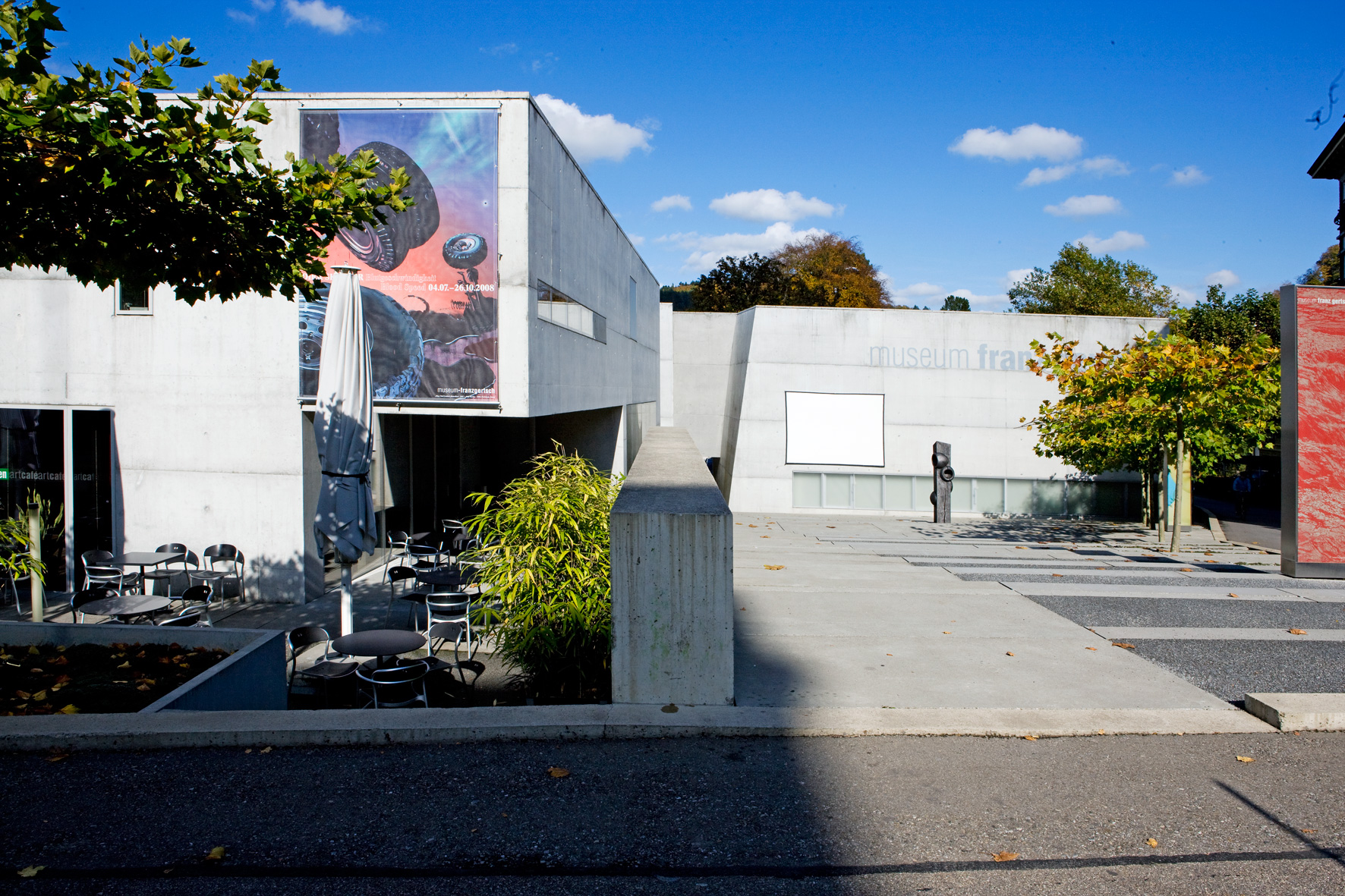
Museum Franz Gertsch

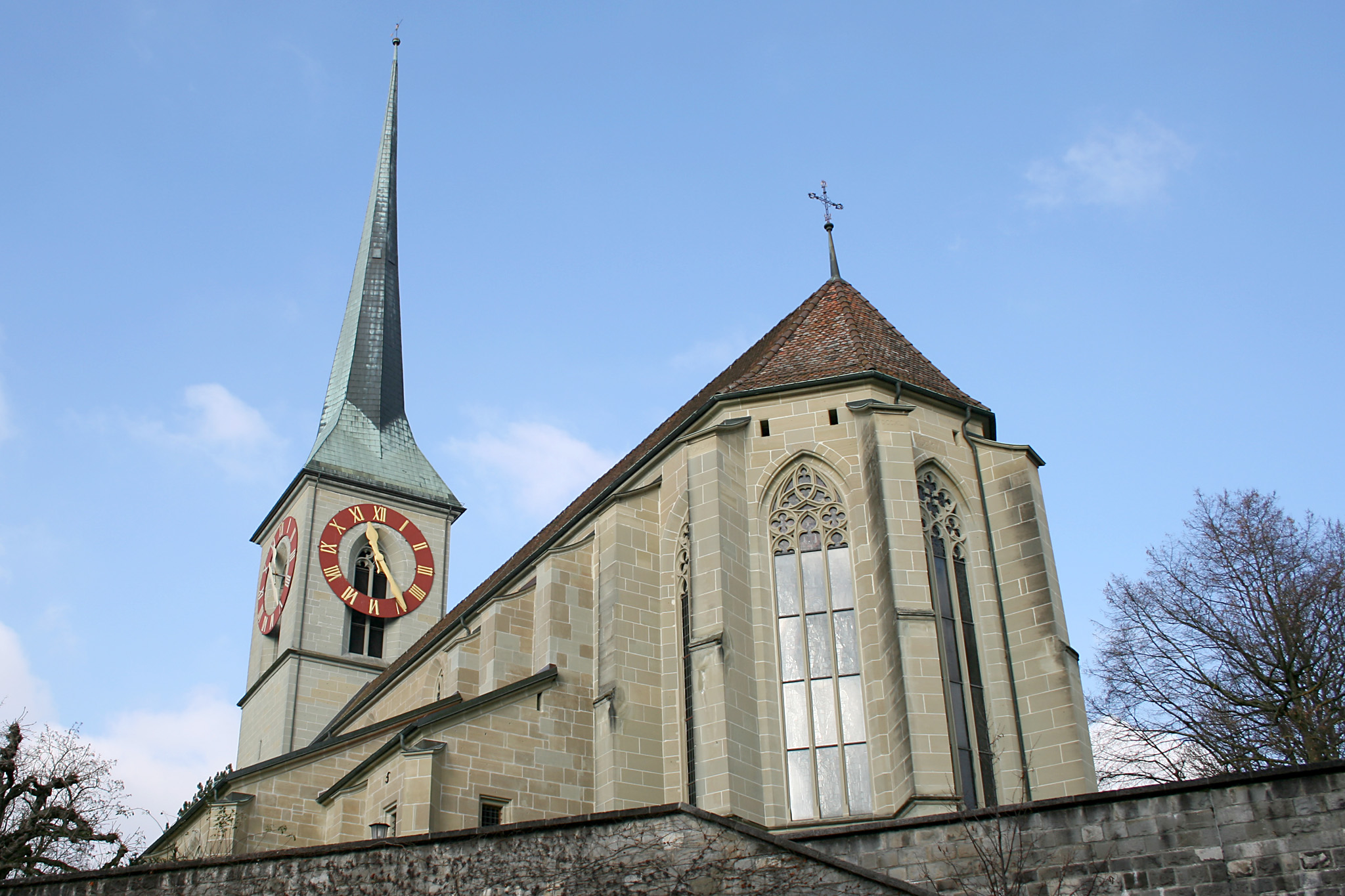
Swiss Reformed City Church

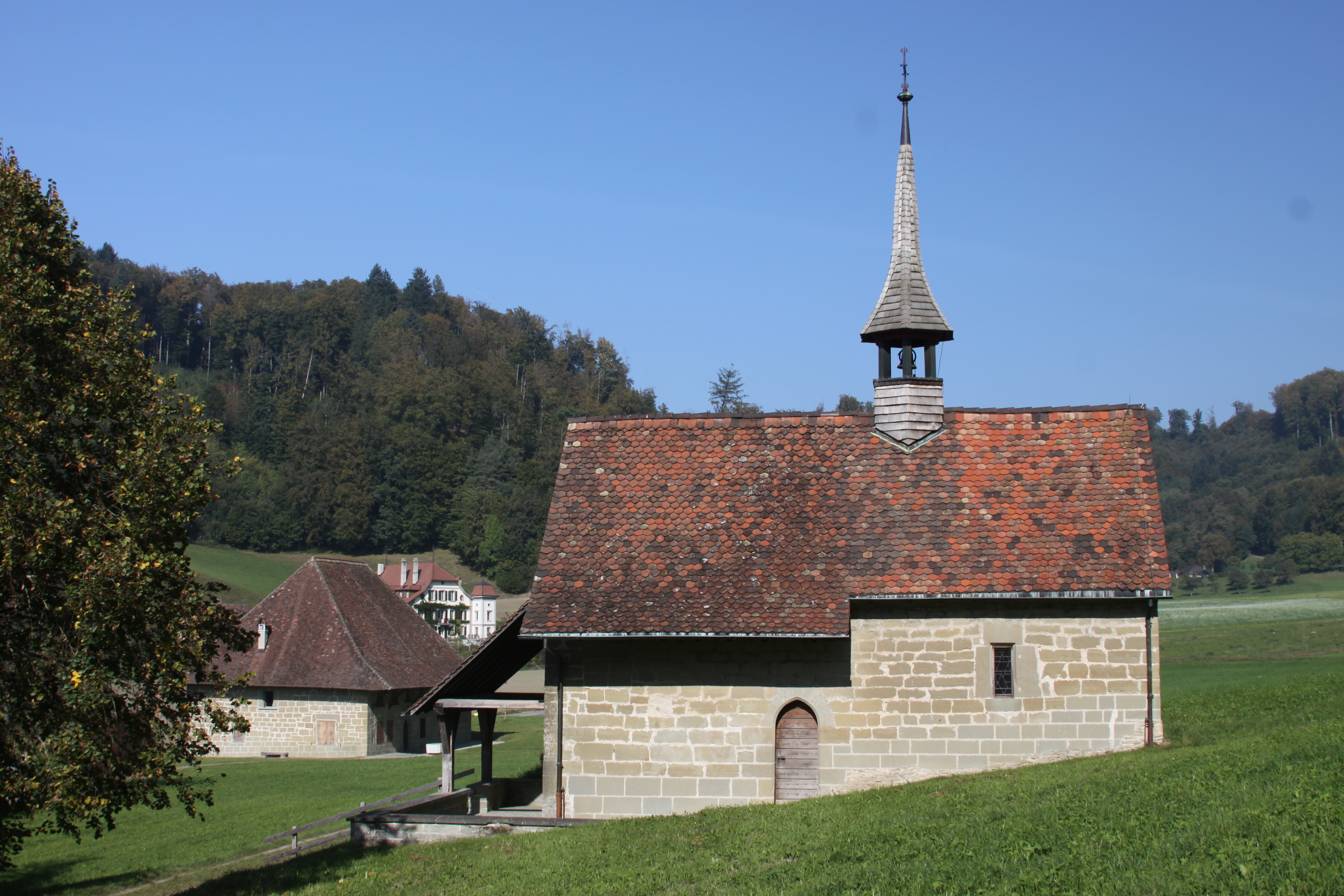
Quarantine House and Chapel

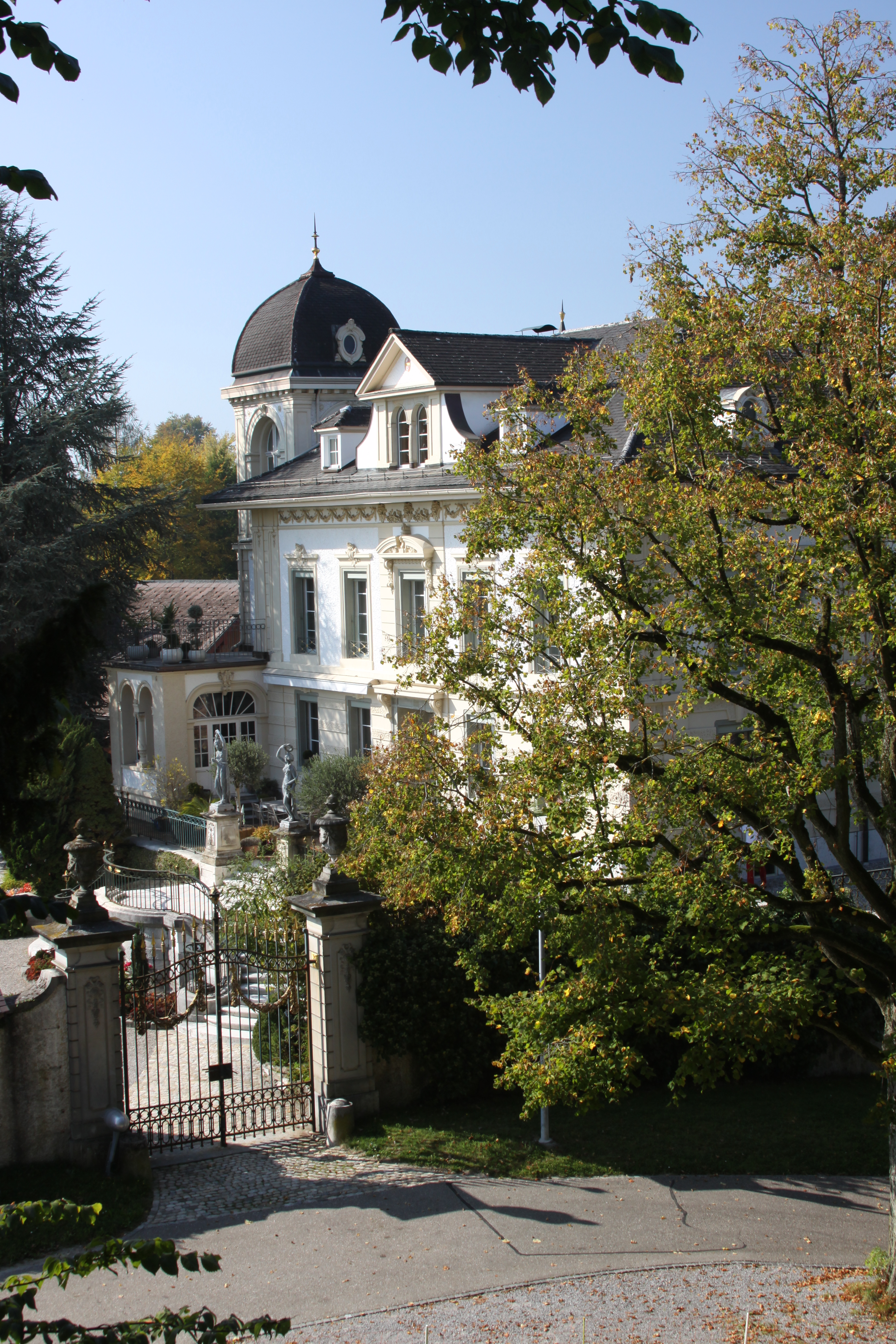
Villa Roth

=== Points of interest ===
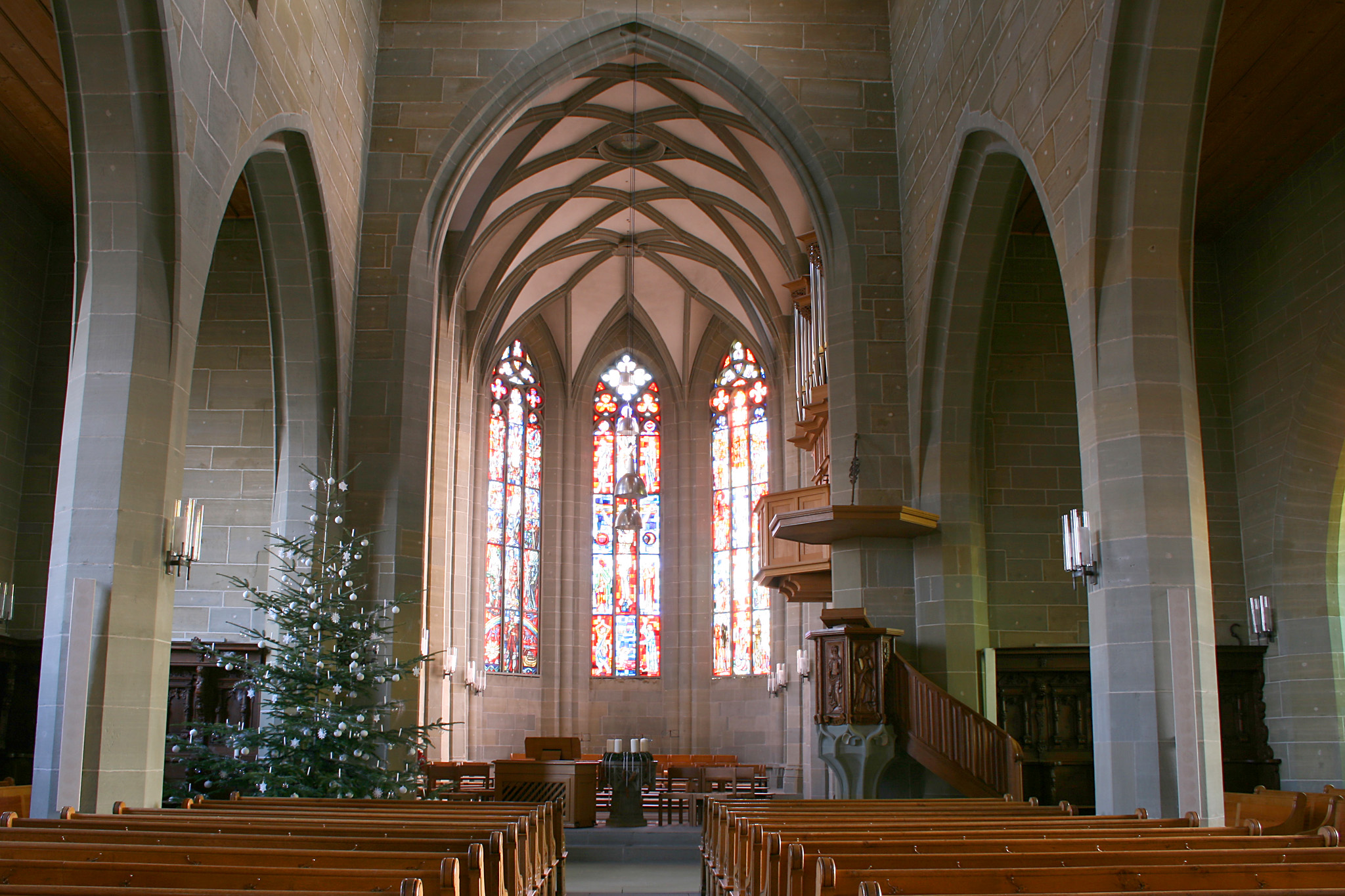
Interior of the Late Gothic Stadtkirche (City Church)

- The old town centre, with alleyways, squares and many historical buildings
- Late Gothic church 1471/1490
- Burgdorf Castle
- The "Badi" (which means public swimming pool)
- Museum Franz Gertsch
- Kornhaus (cornhouse)
- Burgdorf Flüeh (4 huge rocks) and the river Emme
- Burgdorf Schützematte, a big field, meeting point of peoples

== Twin towns ==
Burgdorf is twinned with the towns of

Burgdorf, Hanover, Germany	Zugló, Hungary	Gabrovo, Bulgaria	San Pellegrino Terme, Italy

== Politics ==
In the 2007 federal election the most popular party was the SPS which received 24.95% of the vote. The next three most popular parties were the SVP (23.02%), the FDP (16.48%) and the Green Party (15.53%). In the federal election, a total of 5,046 votes were cast, and the voter turnout was 46.8%.

== Economy ==
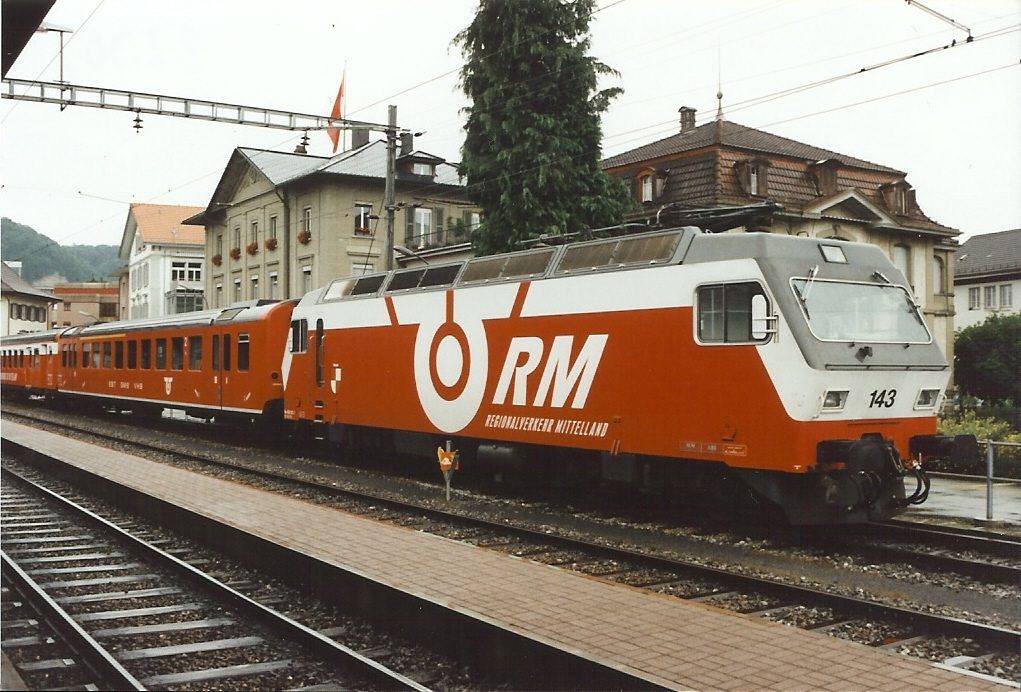
Burgdorf train station

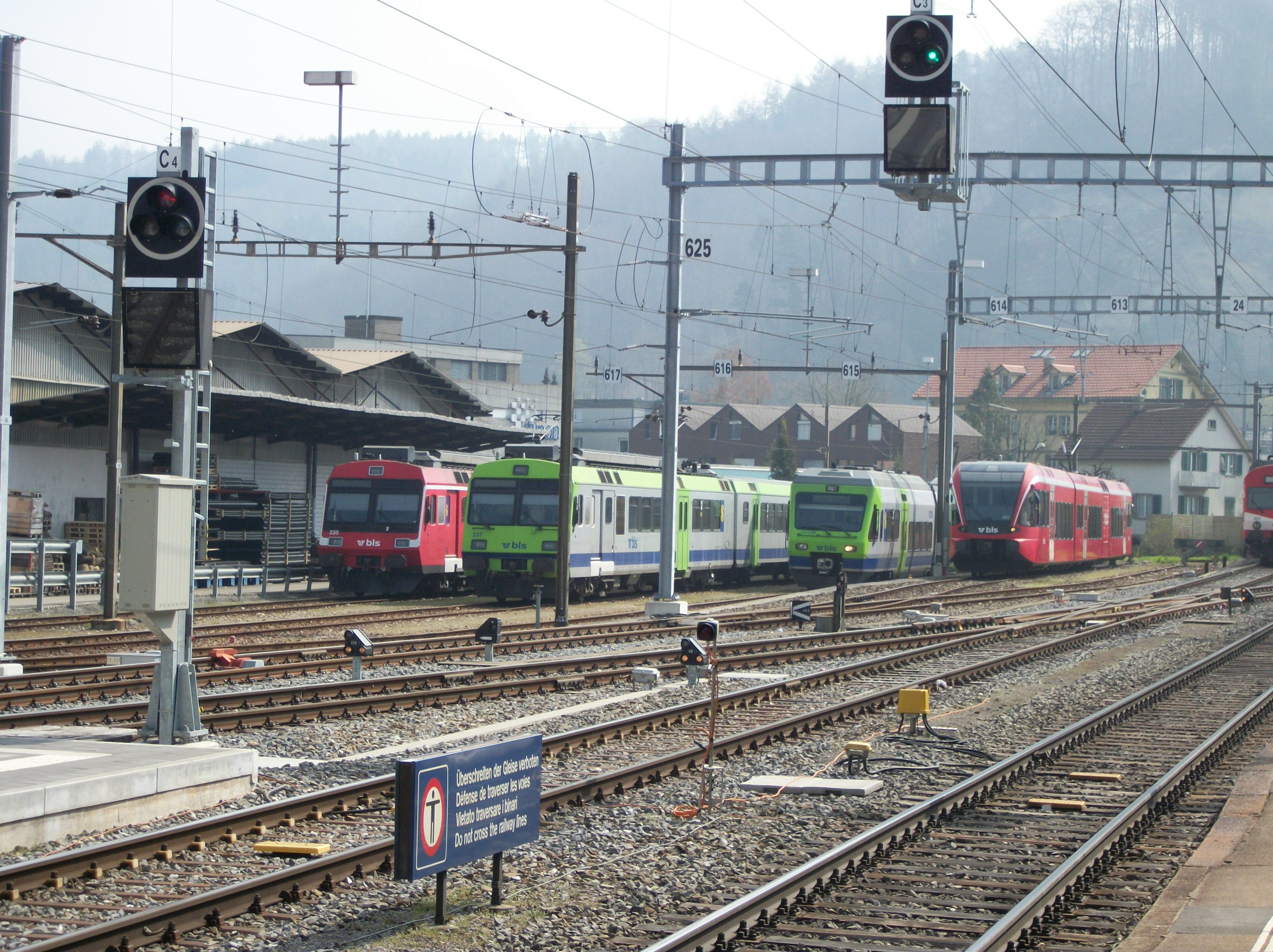
Trains at Burgdorf Station, Switzerland

As of 2010, Burgdorf had an unemployment rate of 4%. As of 2008, there were 40 people employed in the primary economic sector and about 13 businesses involved in this sector. 4,027 people were employed in the secondary sector and there were 137 businesses in this sector. 7,538 people were employed in the tertiary sector, with 691 businesses in this sector.

In 2008 the total number of full-time equivalent jobs was 9,754. The number of jobs in the primary sector was 31, of which 24 were in agriculture and 7 were in forestry or lumber production. The number of jobs in the secondary sector was 3,784 of which 3,168 or (83.7%) were in manufacturing and 567 (15.0%) were in construction. The number of jobs in the tertiary sector was 5,939. In the tertiary sector; 1,558 or 26.2% were in wholesale or retail sales or the repair of motor vehicles, 431 or 7.3% were in the movement and storage of goods, 255 or 4.3% were in a hotel or restaurant, 127 or 2.1% were in the information industry, 273 or 4.6% were the insurance or financial industry, 392 or 6.6% were technical professionals or scientists, 406 or 6.8% were in education and 1,566 or 26.4% were in health care.

In 2000, there were 7,353 workers who commuted into the municipality and 3,254 workers who commuted away. The municipality is a net importer of workers, with about 2.3 workers entering the municipality for every one leaving. Of the working population, 22.4% used public transportation to get to work, and 37.9% used a private car.

Burgdorf has several engine works and some departments of the Bern University of Applied Sciences (e.g. Architecture and Civil Engineering). Burgdorf has a growing economy, several small companies called KMU (small and middle companies) are located and have their headquarters in Burgdorf, such as Ypsomed (former Disetronic), Aebi, Typon, Iverslee and Seewer.

Burgdorf is also known for its local beer. In 1871 Burgdorf had one of the most modern breweries is Switzerland. However, these local, small breweries closed during the 20th Century. In 1999, a brewery was opened, which brewed a local Burgdorf beer. This beer has won a number of awards at Beerdays in Solothurn.

== Religion ==
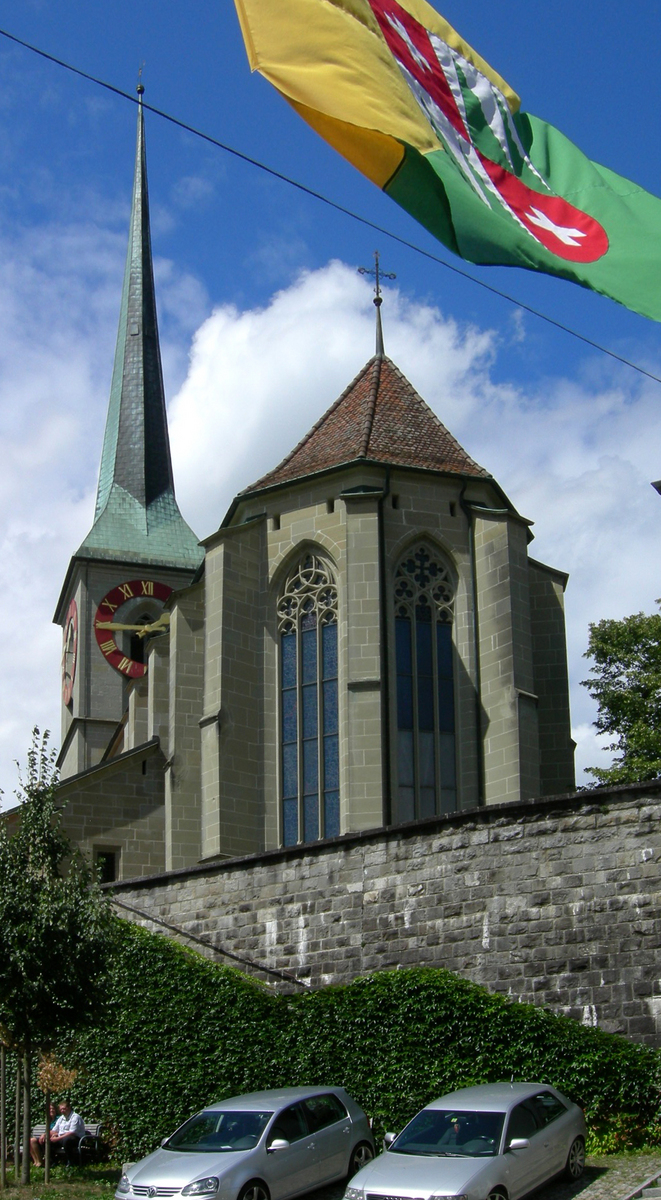
Protestant City Church of Burgdorf

From the 2000 census, 1,993 or 13.5% were Roman Catholic, while 9,275 or 63.0% belonged to the Swiss Reformed Church. Of the rest of the population, there were 211 members of an Orthodox church (or about 1.43% of the population), there were 14 individuals (or about 0.10% of the population) who belonged to the Christian Catholic Church, and there were 1,337 individuals (or about 9.09% of the population) who belonged to another Christian church. There were 3 individuals (or about 0.02% of the population) who were Jewish, and 865 (or about 5.88% of the population) who were Islamic. There were 39 individuals who were Buddhist, 224 individuals who were Hindu and 13 individuals who belonged to another church. 986 (or about 6.70% of the population) belonged to no church, are agnostic or atheist, and 413 individuals (or about 2.81% of the population) did not answer the question.

== Weather ==
Burgdorf has an average of 127.1 days of rain or snow per year and on average receives 1,041 mm (41.0 in) of precipitation. The wettest month is August during which time Burgdorf receives an average of 121 mm (4.8 in) of rain or snow. During this month there is precipitation for an average of 10.9 days. The month with the most days of precipitation is May, with an average of 13, but with only 108 mm (4.3 in) of rain or snow. The driest month of the year is February with an average of 67 mm (2.6 in) of precipitation over 10 days.

== Education ==
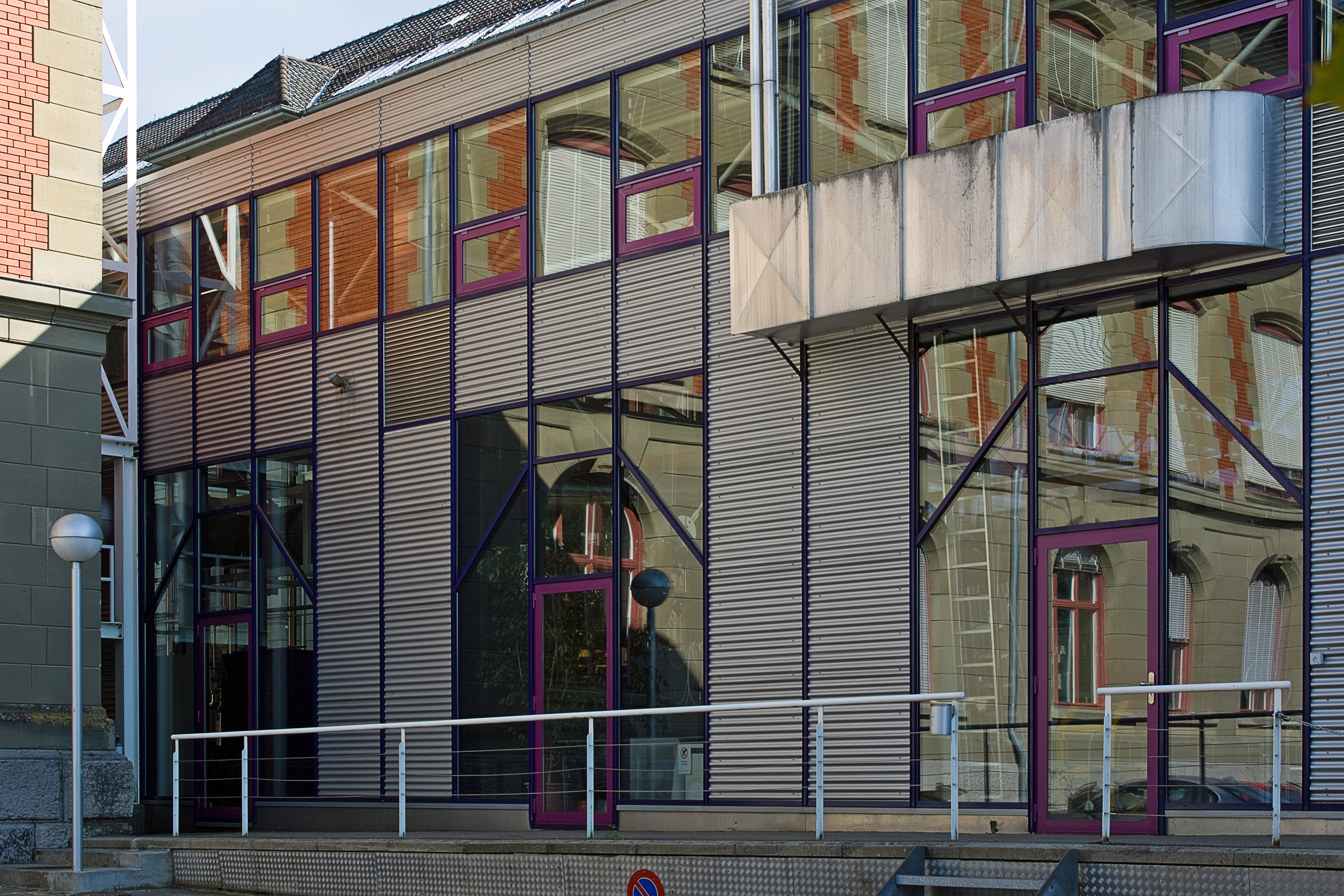
New building at the Kantonales Technikum

In Burgdorf about 5,950 or (40.4%) of the population have completed non-mandatory upper secondary education, and 1,918 or (13.0%) have completed additional higher education (either university or a Fachhochschule). Of the 1,918 who completed tertiary schooling, 65.9% were Swiss men, 25.1% were Swiss women, 5.0% were non-Swiss men and 4.0% were non-Swiss women.

The Canton of Bern school system provides one year of non-obligatory Kindergarten, followed by six years of Primary school. This is followed by three years of obligatory lower Secondary school where the students are separated according to ability and aptitude. Following the lower Secondary students may attend additional schooling or they may enter an apprenticeship.

During the 2009–10 school year, there were a total of 1,767 students attending classes in Burgdorf. There were 14 kindergarten classes with a total of 247 students in the municipality. Of the kindergarten students, 13.8% were permanent or temporary residents of Switzerland (not citizens) and 23.5% have a different mother language than the classroom language. The municipality had 49 primary classes and 924 students. Of the primary students, 12.3% were permanent or temporary residents of Switzerland (not citizens) and 23.5% have a different mother language than the classroom language. During the same year, there were 30 lower secondary classes with a total of 548 students. There were 9.9% who were permanent or temporary residents of Switzerland (not citizens) and 21.2% have a different mother language than the classroom language.

As of 2000, there were 1,152 students in Burgdorf who came from another municipality, while 239 residents attended schools outside the municipality.

Burgdorf is home to 2 libraries. These libraries are the Stadtbibliothek Burgdorf and the BFH Technik und Informatik TI und Architektur, Holz und Bau AHB Burgdorf. There was a combined total (as of 2008) of 69,376 books or other media in the libraries, and in the same year a total of 266,590 items were loaned out.

== Transportation ==
The municipality has four railway stations: Burgdorf, Burgdorf Steinhof, Burgdorf Buchmatt, and Oberburg. The first of these is a major railway junction, served by three different lines; the other three are located north and south of it on the Solothurn–Langnau line. Between them there is regular service to Zürich Hauptbahnhof, Olten, Bern, Thun, Langnau i.E., Solothurn, and Sumiswald-Grünen.

== Notable people ==
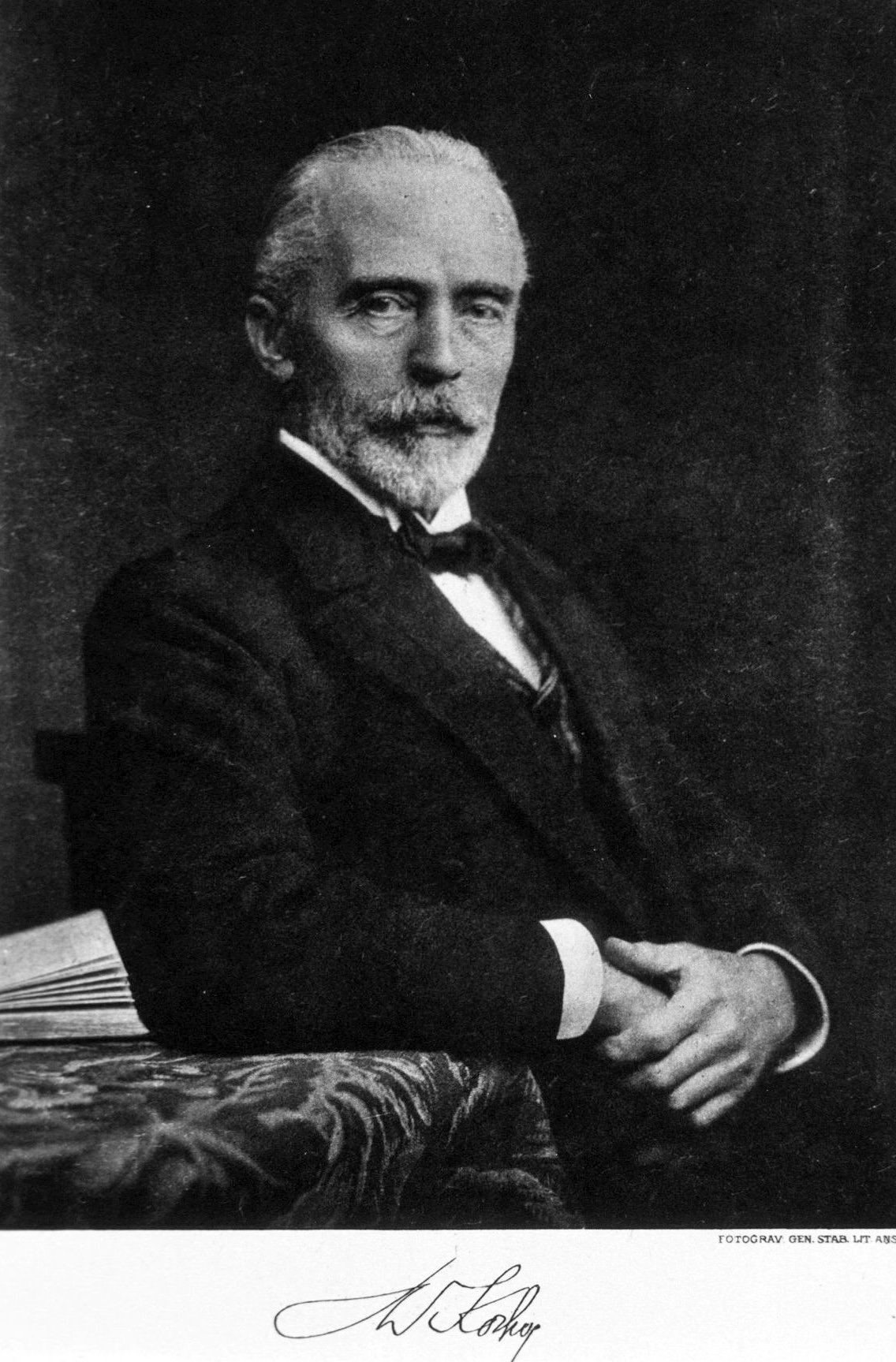
Emil Theodor Kocher, 1909

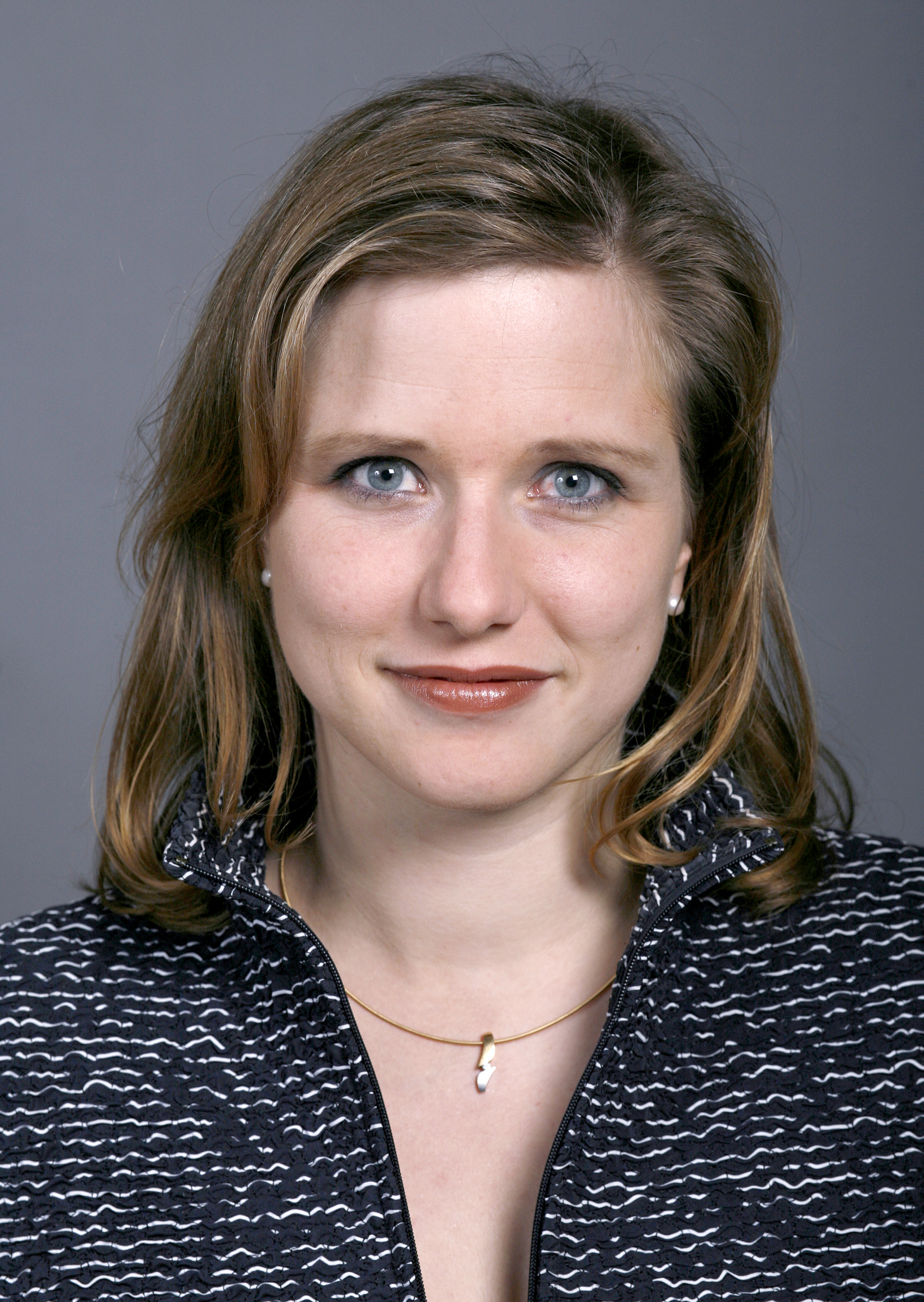
Christa Markwalder, c. 2010

early times

- Jean Maritz (1680 in Burgdorf – 1743), a Swiss inventor, invented the vertical drilling machine
- Samuel Hieronymus Grimm (1733 in Burgdorf – 1794), a landscape artist, worked in oils and watercolours
- Johann Heinrich Pestalozzi (1746–1827) used to live and teach in Burgdorf Castle.

19th C

- Johann August Sutter (1803–1880), Californian pioneer, left Burgdorf for America in 1834
- Karl Eduard Aeschlimann (1808 in Burgdorf – 1893), an architect, court architect of the Russian royal family
- Jacques Burkhardt (1808–1867), scientific illustrator and associate of Louis Agassiz
- Max Schneckenburger (1819 – 1849 in Burgdorf), a poet, lived and died in Burgdorf
- John Augustus Sutter Jr. (1826 in Burgdorf – 1897), founder and planner of Sacramento, California
- Emil Theodor Kocher (1841–1917), a Swiss physician and medical researcher, received the 1909 Nobel Prize in Physiology or Medicine, grew up im Burgdorf
- Ferdinand Schiess VC, (1856 in Burgdorf – 1884), Swiss Victoria Cross recipient at Rorke's Drift

20th C

- Franz Schnyder (1910 in Burgdorf – 1993), a Swiss film director and screenwriter
- Hermann Haller (1914 in Burgdorf – 2002), a Swiss composer
- Lisa della Casa (1919 in Burgdorf – 2012), a Swiss soprano
- Fritz Hofmann (1924 – 2005 in Burgdorf), a Swiss politician
- John Mbiti (born 1931 in Kenya – 2019), an African theologian and philosopher, parish minister in Burgdorf
- Willy Michel, (born 1947 in Burgdorf), co-founder of Museum Franz Gertsch
- Annemarie Buchmann-Gerber (1947 in Burgdorf – 2015), a Canadian artist, worked with textiles and fiber materials
- Res Ingold (born 1954 in Burgdorf), a contemporary Swiss artist
- Christine Brand (born 1973 in Burgdorf), a Swiss writer and journalist
- Christa Markwalder (born 1975 in Burgdorf), a Swiss politician, former president of the National Council

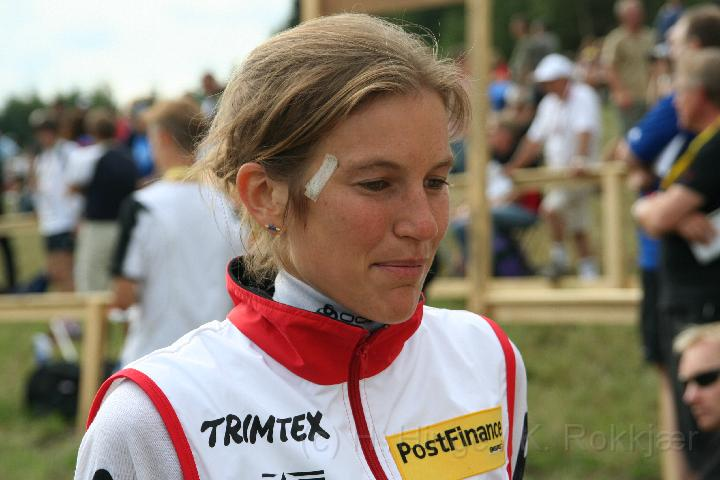
Simone Niggli-Luder, 2006

Sport

- Martin Gerber (born 1974 in Burgdorf), a Swiss former professional ice hockey goaltender
- Nuri Seferi (born 1976), a professional boxer, brought up and lives in Burgdorf
- Simone Niggli-Luder (born 1978), a Swiss Orienteering World Champion, brought up in Burgdorf
- Martina Moser (born 1986 in Burgdorf), a Swiss footballer, played 126 games for Swiss national team
- Alain Berger (born 1990 in Burgdorf), a Swiss professional ice hockey forward

== Special events ==
- Solätte – #1 event in Burgdorf, old tradition child event (last Monday of June)
- Gymfest – big party organized by a group of students of Gymnasium Burgdorf (January)
- Pogoschütz – an openair concert on the Schützenmatte (September)
- Cinete – an openair movie theater, every year during summer
- Kalter Märt – the largest fair in Burgdorf; every year 10,000 people come to shop in the old city of Burgdorf (cold winter time)
- Burgdorfer Stadtlauf – Burgdorf running race through the city of Burgdorf
