= Municipalities of the canton of Bern =

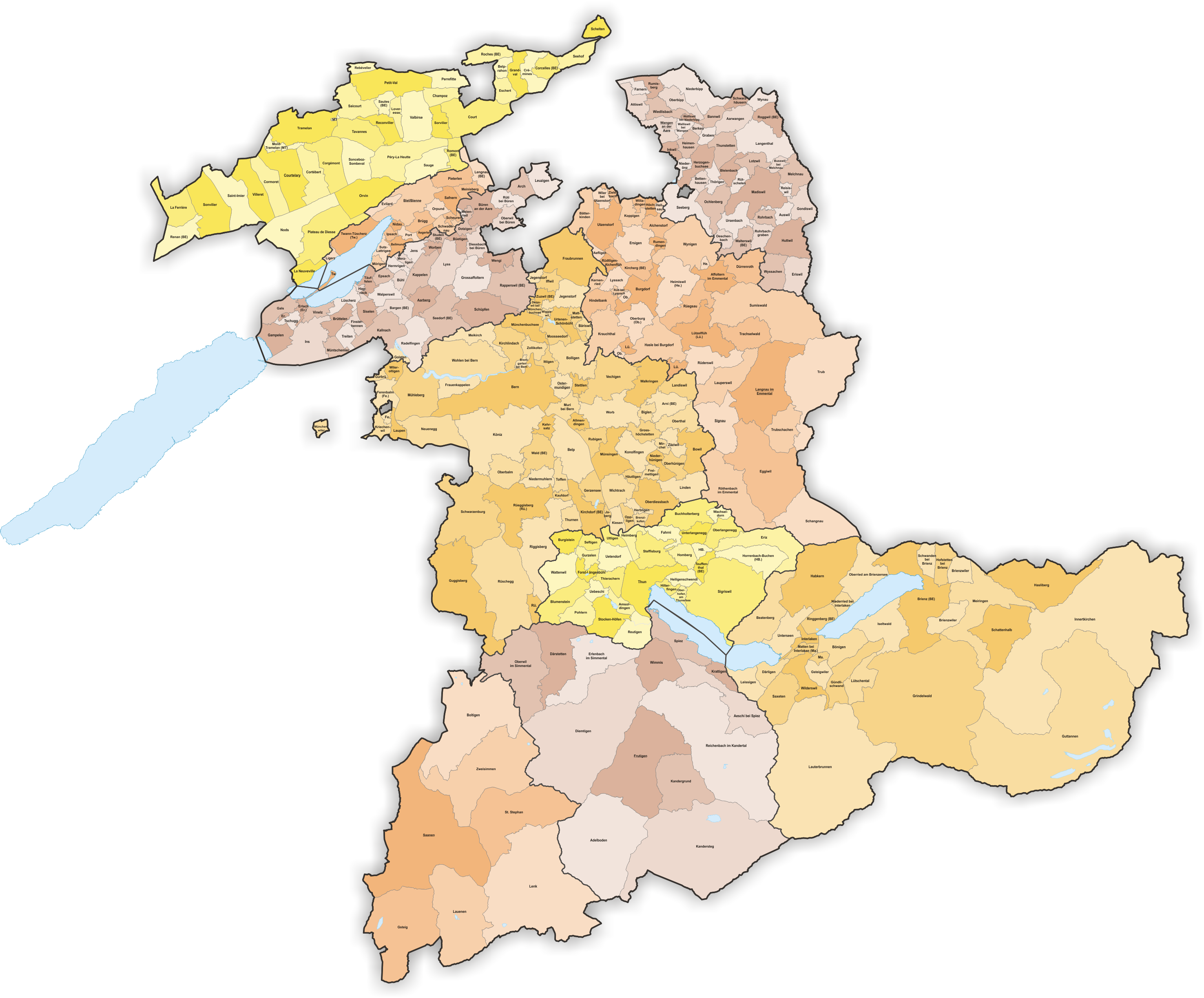
Municipalities in the canton of Bern

There are 334 municipalities in the canton of Bern, Switzerland (as of January 2026).

== List ==
- Aarberg
- Aarwangen
- Adelboden
- Aefligen
- Aegerten
- Aeschi bei Spiez
- Affoltern im Emmental
- Alchenstorf
- Allmendingen
- Amsoldingen
- Arch
- Arni
- Attiswil
- Auswil
- Bannwil
- Bargen
- Bäriswil
- Bätterkinden
- Beatenberg
- Bellmund
- Belp
- Belprahon
- Berken
- Bern
- Bettenhausen
- Biel/Bienne
- Biglen
- Bleienbach
- Blumenstein
- Bolligen
- Boltigen
- Bönigen
- Bowil
- Bremgarten bei Bern
- Brenzikofen
- Brienz
- Brienzwiler
- Brügg
- Brüttelen
- Buchholterberg
- Büetigen
- Bühl
- Büren an der Aare
- Burgdorf
- Burgistein
- Busswil bei Melchnau
- Champoz
- Corcelles
- Corgémont
- Cormoret
- Cortébert
- Court
- Courtelary
- Crémines
- Därligen
- Därstetten
- Deisswil bei Münchenbuchsee
- Diemtigen
- Diessbach bei Büren
- Dotzigen
- Dürrenroth
- Eggiwil
- Epsach
- Eriswil
- Eriz
- Erlach
- Erlenbach im Simmental
- Ersigen
- Eschert
- Evilard
- Fahrni
- Farnern
- Ferenbalm
- Finsterhennen
- Forst-Längenbühl
- Fraubrunnen
- Frauenkappelen
- Freimettigen
- Frutigen
- Gals
- Gampelen
- Gerzensee
- Gondiswil
- Graben
- Grandval
- Grindelwald
- Grossaffoltern
- Grosshöchstetten
- Gsteig bei Gstaad
- Gsteigwiler
- Guggisberg
- Gündlischwand
- Gurbrü
- Gurzelen
- Guttannen
- Habkern
- Hagneck
- Hasle bei Burgdorf
- Hasliberg
- Häutligen
- Heiligenschwendi
- Heimberg
- Heimenhausen
- Heimiswil
- Hellsau
- Herbligen
- Hermrigen
- Herzogenbuchsee
- Hilterfingen
- Hindelbank
- Höchstetten
- Hofstetten bei Brienz
- Homberg
- Horrenbach-Buchen
- Huttwil
- Iffwil
- Inkwil
- Innertkirchen
- Ins
- Interlaken
- Ipsach
- Iseltwald
- Ittigen
- Jaberg
- Jegenstorf
- Jens
- Kallnach
- Kandergrund
- Kandersteg
- Kappelen
- Kaufdorf
- Kehrsatz
- Kernenried
- Kiesen
- Kirchberg
- Kirchdorf
- Kirchlindach
- Köniz
- Konolfingen
- Koppigen
- Krattigen
- Krauchthal
- Kriechenwil
- La Ferrière
- La Neuveville
- Landiswil
- Langenthal
- Langnau im Emmental
- Lauenen
- Laupen
- Lauperswil
- Lauterbrunnen
- Leissigen
- Lengnau
- Lenk im Simmental
- Leuzigen
- Ligerz
- Linden
- Lotzwil
- Loveresse
- Lüscherz
- Lütschental
- Lützelflüh
- Lyss
- Lyssach
- Madiswil
- Matten bei Interlaken
- Mattstetten
- Meienried
- Meikirch
- Meinisberg
- Meiringen
- Melchnau
- Merzligen
- Mirchel
- Mont-Tramelan
- Moosseedorf
- Mörigen
- Mühleberg
- Münchenbuchsee
- Münchenwiler
- Münsingen
- Müntschemier
- Muri bei Bern
- Neuenegg
- Nidau
- Niederbipp
- Niederhünigen
- Niedermuhlern
- Niederönz
- Niederried bei Interlaken
- Nods
- Oberbalm
- Oberbipp
- Oberburg
- Oberdiessbach
- Oberhofen am Thunersee
- Oberhünigen
- Oberlangenegg
- Oberried am Brienzersee
- Oberthal
- Oberwil bei Büren
- Oberwil im Simmental
- Ochlenberg
- Oeschenbach
- Oppligen
- Orpund
- Orvin
- Ostermundigen
- Perrefitte
- Péry-La Heutte
- Petit-Val
- Pieterlen
- Plateau de Diesse
- Pohlern
- Port
- Radelfingen
- Rapperswil
- Rebévelier
- Reconvilier
- Reichenbach im Kandertal
- Reisiswil
- Renan
- Reutigen
- Riggisberg
- Ringgenberg
- Roches
- Roggwil
- Rohrbach
- Rohrbachgraben
- Romont
- Röthenbach im Emmental
- Rubigen
- Rüderswil
- Rüdtligen-Alchenflüh
- Rüeggisberg
- Rüegsau
- Rumendingen
- Rumisberg
- Rüschegg
- Rüti bei Büren
- Rüti bei Lyssach
- Rütschelen
- Saanen
- Safnern
- Saicourt
- Saint-Imier
- Sauge
- Saules
- Saxeten
- Schangnau
- Schattenhalb
- Schelten
- Scheuren
- Schüpfen
- Schwadernau
- Schwanden bei Brienz
- Schwarzenburg
- Schwarzhäusern
- Seeberg
- Seedorf
- Seehof
- Seftigen
- Signau
- Sigriswil
- Siselen
- Sonceboz-Sombeval
- Sonvilier
- Sorvilier
- Spiez
- St. Stephan
- Steffisburg
- Stettlen
- Stocken-Höfen
- Studen
- Sumiswald
- Sutz-Lattrigen
- Täuffelen
- Tavannes
- Teuffenthal
- Thierachern
- Thörigen
- Thun
- Thunstetten
- Thurnen
- Toffen
- Trachselwald
- Tramelan
- Treiten
- Trub
- Trubschachen
- Tschugg
- Twann-Tüscherz
- Uebeschi
- Uetendorf
- Unterlangenegg
- Unterseen
- Ursenbach
- Urtenen-Schönbühl
- Uttigen
- Utzenstorf
- Valbirse
- Vechigen
- Villeret
- Vinelz
- Wachseldorn
- Wald
- Walkringen
- Walliswil bei Niederbipp
- Walliswil bei Wangen
- Walperswil
- Walterswil
- Wangen an der Aare
- Wattenwil
- Wengi
- Wichtrach
- Wiedlisbach
- Wiggiswil
- Wilderswil
- Wiler bei Utzenstorf
- Wileroltigen
- Willadingen
- Wimmis
- Wohlen bei Bern
- Worb
- Worben
- Wynau
- Wynigen
- Wyssachen
- Zäziwil
- Zielebach
- Zollikofen
- Zuzwil
- Zweisimmen

== Mergers ==
January 1, 2004
Englisberg and Zimmerwald merge to form Wald
Niederwichtrach and Oberwichtrach merge to form Wichtrach

January 1, 2007
Forst and Längenbühl merge to form Forst-Längenbühl
Gutenburg and Madiswil merge to form Madiswil

January 1, 2008
Oberönz and Herzogenbuchsee merge to form Herzogenbuchsee

January 1, 2009
Wanzwil, Heimenhausen and Röthenbach bei Herzogenbuchsee merge to form Heimenhausen
Rüti bei Riggisberg and Riggisberg merge to form Riggisberg

January 1, 2010
Ballmoos and Jegenstorf merge to form Jegenstorf
Twann and Tüscherz-Alfermée merge to form Twann-Tüscherz
Untersteckholz and Langenthal merge to form Langenthal
Aeschlen bei Oberdiessbach and Oberdiessbach merge to form Oberdiessbach

January 1, 2011
Bettenhausen and Bollodingen merge to form Bettenhausen
Busswil bei Büren and Lyss merge to form Lyss
Leimiswil, Kleindietwil and Madiswil merge to form Madiswil
Wahlern and Albligen merge to form Schwarzenburg

January 1, 2012
Belp and Belpberg merge to form Belp

January 1, 2013
Kallnach and Niederried bei Kallnach merge to form Kallnach
Rapperswil BE and Ruppoldsried merge to form Rapperswil BE
Münsingen and Trimstein merge to form Münsingen

January 1, 2014
Büren zum Hof, Etzelkofen, Fraubrunnen, Grafenried, Limpach, Mülchi, Schalunen and Zauggenried merge to form Fraubrunnen
Gadmen and Innertkirchen merge to form Innertkirchen
Jegenstorf, Münchringen and Scheunen merge to form Jegenstorf
Bleiken bei Oberdiessbach and Oberdiessbach merge to form Oberdiessbach
Lamboing, Diesse and Prêles merge to form Plateau de Diesse
Plagne and Vauffelin merge to form Sauge
Höfen bei Thun, Niederstocken and Oberstocken merge to form Stocken-Höfen
Kienersrüti and Uttigen merge to form Uttigen

January 1, 2015
La Heutte and Péry merge to form Péry-La Heutte
Châtelat, Monible, Sornetan and Souboz merge to form Petit-Val
Bévilard, Malleray and Pontenet merge to form Valbirse

January 1, 2016
Ersigen, Niederösch and Oberösch merge to form Ersigen
Bangerten and Rapperswil BE merge to form Rapperswil BE
Hermiswil and Seeberg merge to form Seeberg

January 1, 2017
Münsingen and Tägertschi merge to form Münsingen

January 1, 2018
Grosshöchstetten and Schlosswil merge to form Grosshöchstetten
Gelterfingen, Kirchdorf, Mühledorf and Noflen merge to form Kirchdorf

January 1, 2019
Golaten and Kallnach merge to form Kallnach

January 1, 2020
Schwendibach and Steffisburg merge to form Steffisburg
Niederbipp and Wolfisberg merge to form Niederbipp
Kirchenthurnen, Lohnstorf and Mühlethurnen merge to form Thurnen

January 1, 2021
Langenthal and Obersteckholz merge to form Langenthal
Riggisberg and Rümligen merge to form Riggisberg
Hindelbank and Mötschwil merge to form Hindelbank

January 1, 2022
Clavaleyres and Murten (Canton of Freiburg) merge to form Murten

January 1, 2023
Diemerswil and Münchenbuchsee merge to form Münchenbuchsee

January 1, 2024
Wangen an der Aare and Wangenried merged to form Wangen an der Aare
Reutigen and Zwieselberg merged to form Reutigen
