= Seeberg =

- Municipality
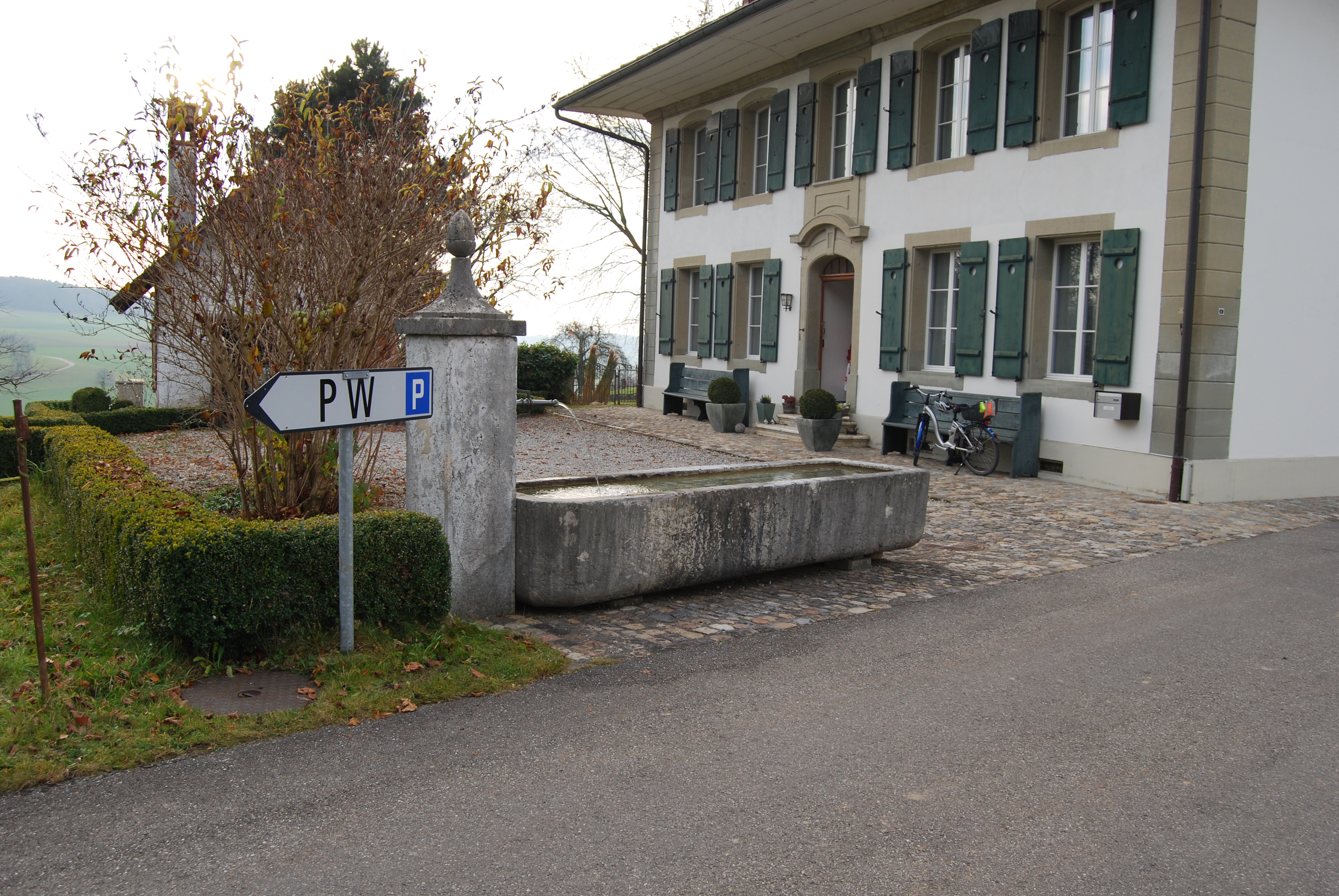
- Buildings and fountain in Seeberg village

- Flag Coat of arms
- Location of Seeberg
- Location within Switzerland Location within Canton of Bern
- Coordinates: 47°9′N 7°40′E
- Country: Switzerland
- Canton: Bern
- District: Oberaargau

Area
  - Total: 15.8 km^{2} (6.1 sq mi)
- Elevation: 495 m (1,624 ft)

Population (December 2020)
  - Total: 1,559
  - Density: 98.7/km^{2} (256/sq mi)
- Time zone: UTC+01:00 (CET)
  - Summer (DST): UTC+02:00 (CEST)
- Postal code: 3365
- SFOS number: 988
- ISO 3166 code: CH-BE
- Surrounded by: Aeschi (SO), Alchenstorf, Heinrichswil-Winistorf (SO), Hellsau, Hermiswil, Oberönz, Ochlenberg, Steinhof (SO), Wynigen
- Website: www.seeberg.ch

Seeberg is a municipality in the Oberaargau administrative district in the canton of Bern in Switzerland. The lake Burgäschisee is located on the border with Aeschi. On 1 January 2016 the former municipality of Hermiswil merged into Seeberg.

== History ==
Aerial view from 400 m by Walter Mittelholzer (1925)

=== Hermiswil ===
Hermiswil is first mentioned in 1289 as Hermanswile.

During the 13th and 14th Centuries, the Hermiswil area had been granted by the Kyburg family to the vom Stein family. In 1466, the city of Solothurn inherited all the vom Stein holdings, including Hermiswil. Following the Wyniger Vertrag (Wynigen Treaty), of 1665, the village was given to Bern. It was placed under the authority for low justice from Bollodingen and administered by the Landvogtei of Wangen. The Roman Catholic citizens of Hermiswil were placed under the guidance of the Reformed parish of Herzogenbuchsee.

While the village is located along two transportation routes (the road from Bern into the Aargau, and since 1857 the rail line from Olten to Bern) it has remained a small farming community.

=== Oschwand ===
Painter Cuno Amiet lived the second part of his life in this hamlet of Seeberg. He died there.

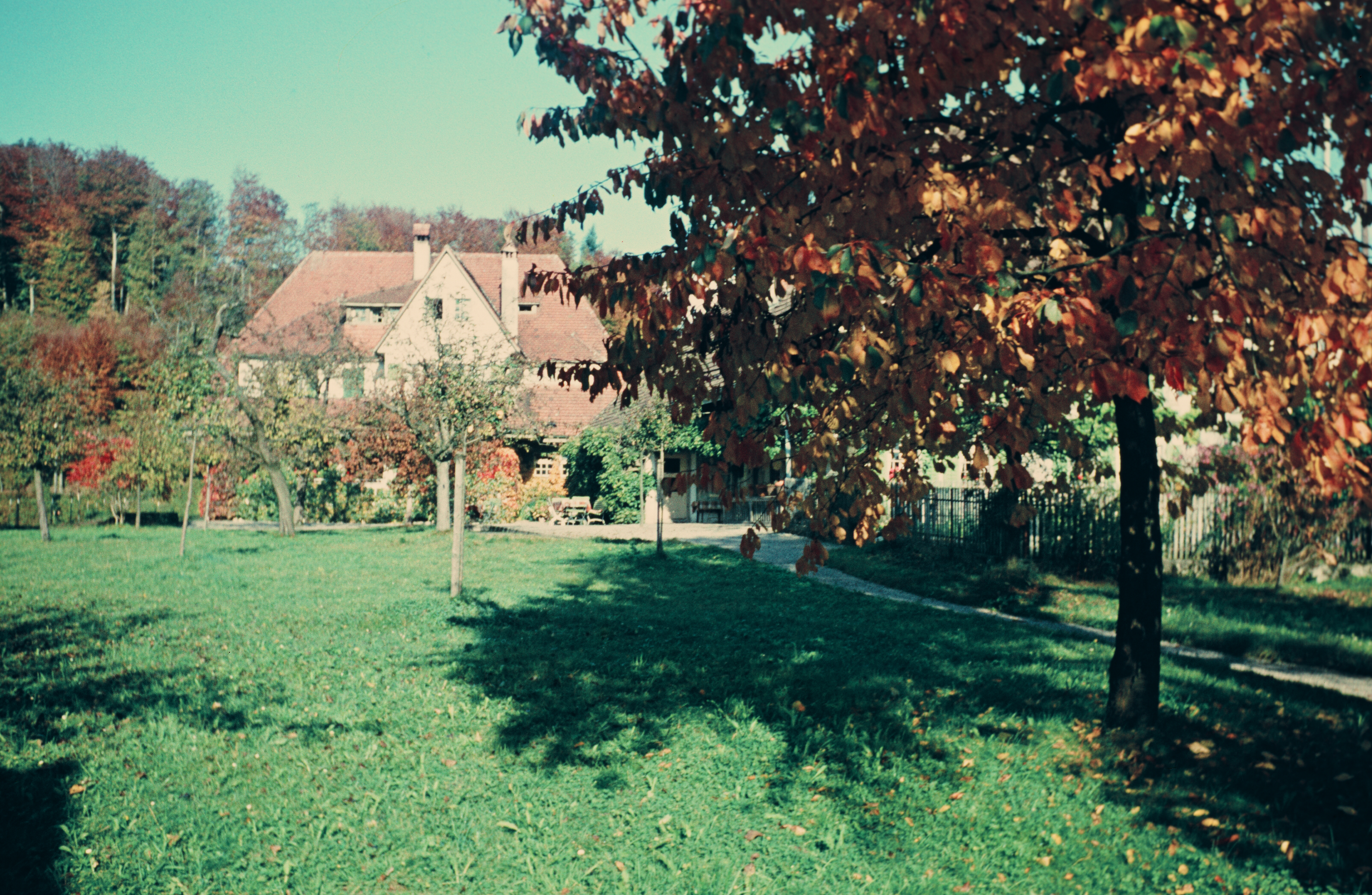
The house of Cuno Amiet in Oschwand, picture Ernst Klöti, circa 1956

== Geography ==
Before the merger, Seeberg has an area of 15.8 km^{2} (6.1 sq mi). Of this area, 58.8% is used for agricultural purposes, while 34% is forested. Of the rest of the land, 6.5% is settled (buildings or roads) and the remainder (0.7%) is non-productive (rivers, glaciers or mountains).

== Demographics ==
Seeberg has a population (as of 31 December 2020) of 1,559. As of 2007, 2.0% of the population was made up of foreign nationals. Over the last 10 years the population has decreased at a rate of -2.4%. Most of the population (as of 2000) speaks German (97.5%), with Turkish being second most common ( 0.7%) and French being third ( 0.5%).

In the 2007 election the most popular party was the SVP which received 49.6% of the vote. The next three most popular parties were the SPS (14.5%), the Green Party (8.9%) and the FDP (8.7%).

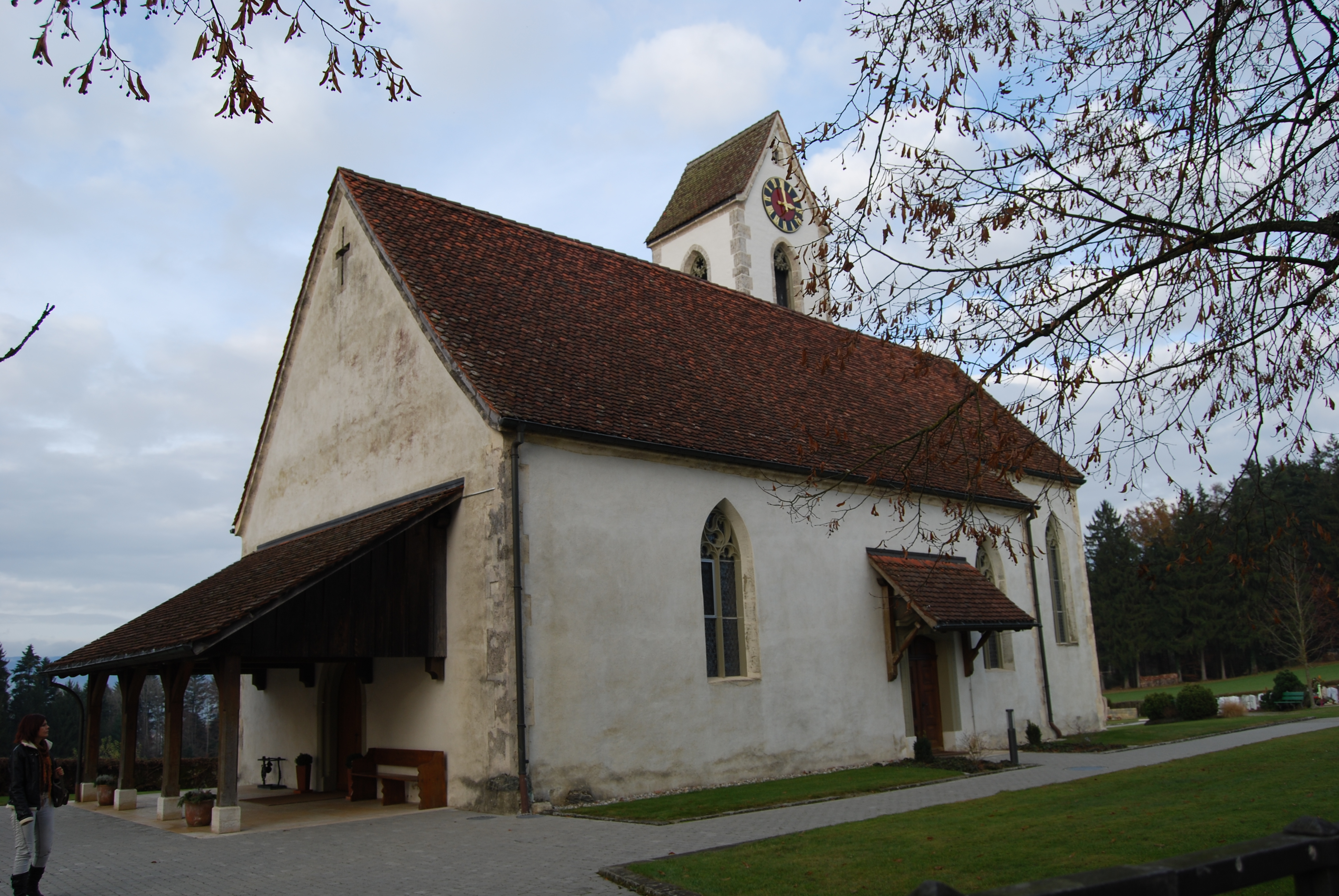
Church of Seeberg.

The age distribution of the population (as of 2000) is children and teenagers (0–19 years old) make up 27% of the population, while adults (20–64 years old) make up 58.3% and seniors (over 64 years old) make up 14.7%. In Seeberg about 77.1% of the population (between age 25-64) have completed either non-mandatory upper secondary education or additional higher education (either university or a Fachhochschule).

Seeberg has an unemployment rate of 0.69%. As of 2005, there were 157 people employed in the primary economic sector and about 59 businesses involved in this sector. 77 people are employed in the secondary sector and there are 21 businesses in this sector. 138 people are employed in the tertiary sector, with 34 businesses in this sector.
