= Simon Berger =

Simon Berger may refer to:

- Simon Berger (artist) (born 1976), Swiss artist
- Simon J. Berger (born 1979), Swedish actor
- Simon Berger, Australian media person involved in Alan Jones "died of shame" controversy
