= Pierre du Bois de Dunilac =

Historian (1943–2007)

Pierre du Bois
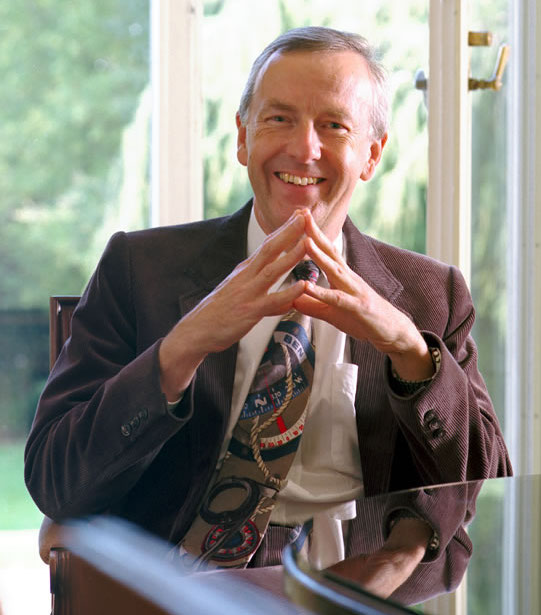
- Born: 5 May 1943; Herzogenbuchsee, Switzerland
- Died: 23 June 2007 (aged 64); Pully, Switzerland
- Other name: Pierre du Bois de Dunilac
- Education: University of Lausanne
- Occupation: Historian
- Organization(s): Graduate Institute of International Studies, Institut Européen, Diplomatische Akademie, Robert Schuman University, University of Neuchâtel, Titulescu Foundation
- Notable work: Union et division des Suisses; La Suisse et le défi européen 1945-1992; Ceauşescu au pouvoir; La guerre du Sonderbund; Histoire de l'Europe monétaire
- Spouse: Irina Tamas (m. 1968)
- Website: http://www.fondation-pierredubois.ch

Pierre du Bois de Dunilac (5 May 1943 in Herzogenbuchsee – 23 June 2007 in Pully) was a Swiss historian, whose research primarily addressed issues of European and Swiss history and politics. His work had a strong focus on analysing current affairs in a global context and on the role of history in shaping present-day political decision-making.

== Biography ==
=== Early life and education ===
Born in Herzogenbuchsee, in German-speaking Switzerland, Pierre du Bois moved with his parents to Tangiers at the age of two, before returning to Switzerland two years later after his father’s death and settling in Lausanne with his mother. He attended high school in Lausanne and while still at college won first prize in a radio competition on general knowledge, Echec et Mat, for which the prize was a trip around the world offered by Swissair.

After obtaining degrees in both History (licence ès lettres) and Political Science (licence ès sciences politiques) from the University of Lausanne, Pierre du Bois began his PhD in Paris, with a dissertation on the subject of the life of Pierre Drieu La Rochelle. In Paris, he attended Raymond Aron’s seminar at the Ecole Pratique des Hautes Etudes and became friends with Louis Aragon, Elsa Triolet and Fernand Braudel, inter alia. He was awarded his PhD from the University of Lausanne in 1978.

=== Personal life ===
Pierre du Bois was married to Irina du Bois, a chemical engineer of Romanian origin, whom he met on 21 June 1968 while she was a student at the Swiss Federal Institute of Technology in Lausanne.

=== Career ===
In 1980, Pierre du Bois was appointed Professor at the Institut Universitaire d’Etudes Européennes in Geneva and from this point on, issues of European politics, integration and identity became an increasingly important area of focus in his teaching and research. He served as Visiting Professor at the Diplomatische Akademie in Vienna and the Robert Schuman University in Strasbourg, Associate Professor at the University of Neuchâtel and was a Professor at the Summer University of the Titulescu Foundation in Bucharest.

From 1992 until his death, Pierre du Bois was a Professor of International History and Politics at the Graduate Institute of International Studies in Geneva, where he taught courses on European integration as well as broader issues of international security and international relations. These courses systematically addressed a period that extended to the present day, revealing his particular interest in studying current events through the prism of history.

Alongside his teaching and research, Pierre du Bois contributed articles on issues of history and current affairs to numerous newspapers, journals and literary magazines in France and Switzerland, and was founding editor of the literary journal Nonante. He likewise offered contributions on a broad range of issues on the RSR (Radio Suisse Romande), where he was Foreign Policy editor from 1964-66. His last interview, on the topic of security, was broadcast posthumously on 16 August 2007.

Pierre du Bois was a member of various editorial committees: Revue d’Allemagne, Dosarele Istoriei, Revue roumaine d’histoire, Relations internationales (co-president from 1998), Limes, Revue française de géopolitique and Studia Politica/Romanian Political Science Review. He also served on numerous cultural and scientific committees: Swiss Association for Wilton Park (1984-1994), Forum Helveticum (1987-2001, Vice-President 1992-2001), Rencontres suisses (1987-2001, President 1996-2001), Cercle littéraire de Lausanne (from 1989), Foundation Titulescu (from 1990), Société européenne de culture (from 1990), European Community Studies Association (from 1995), Europaeum (1995-2001), Fondazione Venezia per la ricerca sulla pace (from 1997), Société d’études économiques et sociales (from 1998), Centro per la diffusione della cultura (from 2000) and Kommission für die Diplomatischen Dokumente der Schweiz (from 2000).

== Works and contributions ==
=== Biography and myth ===
Published in 1978, Pierre du Bois’ doctoral thesis was a study of the life of Pierre Drieu La Rochelle, a French novelist and essayist, and traces Drieu’s evolution from the communist-sympathizing bon vivant of the années folles to the self-avowed fascist and collaborator of the wartime years.

The methods developed in the Life of Drieu La Rochelle were to form the basis of an important strand of Pierre du Bois’ historical method: a focus on individuals as drivers of history; the demystification of the individual through contextualization; and an extensive use of first-person testimony (oral history). Following articles exploring the interrelationship between myth and biography in the cases of Hitler and Stalin, along with Les mythologies de la Belle Epoque, the culmination of this approach is an account of the rise to power of Romanian dictator Nicolae Ceauşescu, published in 1998 in Romanian and subsequently in French. In a context where official records are unreliable and in which many of the key events took place off-the-record, first person accounts from many of the major protagonists provide the basis for a unique insight into the “law of the jungle” in which succession is determined in a communist regime.

=== Regional identity, national identity, European identity ===
Born in the heart of German-speaking Switzerland to a father from Neuchâtel, born in Munich, and a mother from Anvers, and living for most of his adult life in Lausanne, it is unsurprising that questions of identity played an important role in Pierre du Bois’ research.

In Union et division des Suisses: les relations entre Alémaniques, Romands et Tessinois aux XIXe et XXe siècles (1983) and Alémaniques et Romands entre unité et discorde (1999), the emphasis is on tracing the origins of longstanding political customs and prejudices which have played a fundamental role in shaping the current Swiss political landscape.

In La guerre du Sonderbund : la Suisse de 1847 (2003, 2018) – the first French-language synthesis since 1850 of Switzerland’s last domestic military conflict – the focus is more clearly on the nineteenth century. The analysis of the war between Catholics and Reformists, between seven Conservative cantons and the remainder of the Confederation, leads to an inevitable rethinking of the myth of a peaceful, harmonious country: “diving into the background materials, I discovered a reality far removed from the Epinal prints of the 19th century. Instead of a peaceful, stable and prosperous country, I discovered chaos.”

From questions of identity within Switzerland, it is a small step to an analysis of similar issues in a European context: A study of the “Balkan Question” in 2000 was followed in 2003 by a more general analysis of overlapping identities – regional, national and European – and an edited volume on domestic federalisms in the same year.

=== European integration ===
Alongside broader issues of identity, an important strand of Pierre du Bois’ research was the analysis of various practical issues relating to European integration in a series of articles and monographs.

The particular issues faced by Switzerland in its relations with its European neighbours are addressed in La Suisse et le défi européen 1945-1992 (1989) and La Suisse et l'Espace économique européen (1992), both written prior to the (unsuccessful) 1992 Swiss referendum on joining the European Economic Area. Despite Pierre du Bois’ clear personal position in favour of joining, these works provide an in-depth historical analysis of the “forces of resistance” opposed to Switzerland’s membership.

Published posthumously in 2008, Pierre du Bois’ final work, Histoire de l’Europe monétaire 1945-2005: Euro qui comme Ulysse…, traces the vicissitudes of European monetary policy in the post-war decades. Analysing the conflicts between the various political and economic interests involved, it charts each step in a process that would ultimately culminate in 1999 with the introduction of the Euro.

== Pierre du Bois Foundation for Current History ==
After his death, his widow Irina du Bois set up, in accordance with the wishes of her late husband, the Pierre du Bois Foundation for Current History. Its mission is to stimulate research in current history and to support researchers and students in this field.

The Foundation awards research and publication grants and the Prix Pierre du Bois, aiming in particular to promote the work of young researchers. Through the organisation of public conferences and symposia, it seeks to encourage exchanges among researchers and the creation of networks. In September 2018, the Geneva Graduate Institute, in partnership with the Pierre du Bois Foundation, inaugurated a new position, the Pierre du Bois Chair Europe and the World. The first holder of the Chair was Michael Goebel, from 2018 to 2021.

== Selected publications ==
- Les mythologies de la Belle Époque : La Chaux-de-Fonds, André Evard et l'Art Nouveau, Lausanne, W. Suter, 1975.
- Drieu La Rochelle. Une vie, Lausanne, Cahiers d’histoire contemporaine, 1978.
- "Musique tsigane et civilisation du divertissement", Cadmos (cahiers trimestriels de l'Institut universitaire d'études européennes de Genève et du Centre européen de la culture), 1979, pp. 62–86.
- "Lausanne, le 27 janvier 1916 : l’affaire du drapeau allemand : contribution à l’étude de ses origines et de sa nature", Revue historique vaudoise, 1980, pp. 113–146.
- "Le mal suisse pendant la première guerre mondiale : fragments d’un discours sur les relations entre Alémaniques, Romands et Tessinois au début du vingtième siècle", Cahiers Vilfredo Pareto, t. 18, n° 53, 1980, pp. 43–66.
- "Politique étrangère roumaine de 1944 à 1947", Revue d’histoire moderne et contemporaine, t. 29, 1982, pp. 411–441.
- "Mythe et biographie : le cas de Staline", Cadmos (cahiers trimestriels de l’Institut universitaire d’études européennes de Genève et du Centre européen de la culture), n° 17/18, 1982, pp. 80–98.
- "La question ukrainienne (1917-1921)", Revue suisse d’histoire, vol. 33, 1983, pp. 141–167.
- Union et division des Suisses : les relations entre Alémaniques, Romands et Tessinois aux XIXe et XXe siècles, Lausanne, Editions de l’Aire, 1983.
- L'AELE d'hier à demain - EFTA from Yesterday to Tomorrow, Geneva, 1987.
- La Suisse et le défi européen 1945-1992, Lausanne, Favre, 1989.
- La Suisse et l'Espace économique européen, Lausanne, L'Âge d'Homme, 1992.
- "L’action humanitaire de la Suisse durant la Première Guerre mondiale", Revue d’Allemagne et des pays de langue allemande, t. 28, n° 3, 1996, pp. 377–389.
- "Green against Orange: la violence en Irlande du Nord (1968-1998)", in Guerre civile - guérilla - terrorisme, Actes du symposium 1998, Pully, Centre d’histoire et de prospective militaires, 1998, pp. 82–93.
- Ancheta asupra unei ascensiuni. Ceaușescu le putere, Bucarest, Info-Team, 1998. French translation: Ceaușescu au pouvoir : enquête sur une ascension, Chêne-Bourg, Georg, 2004.
- Alémaniques et Romands entre unité et discord : histoire et actualité, Lausanne, Paris, Favre, 1999.
- "L’Union européenne et le naufrage de la Yougoslavie (1991-1995)", Relations internationales, n° 104, 2000, pp. 469–485.
- "A la recherche de l’union monétaire de l’Europe (1945-2000)", in Annuaire européen, vol. 46, 2000, La Haye, Dordrecht, Boston, M. Nijhoff, pp. 13–37.
- "La question des Balkans", Relations internationales, n° 103, 2000, pp. 271–277.
- “Los comienzos del diálogo Este-Oeste”, trad. del francés por Hernán G.H. Taboada, Cuadernos Americanos : la revista del nuevo mundo (Mexico), n° 83, 2000, pp. 133–137.
- "L’introduction de l’euro", Revue du droit de l’Union européenne, n° 4, 2001, pp. 855–888.
- "Identité régionale, identité nationale, identité européenne", in Marie-Thérèse Bitsch (dir), Le fait régional et la construction européenne, Bruxelles, Bruylant, 2003, pp. 19–30.
- "Guerre froide, propagande et culture (1945-1953)", Relations internationales, n° 115, 2003, pp. 437–454.
- La guerre du Sonderbund : la Suisse de 1847, Neuchâtel, Editions Livreo-Alphil, 2018. (Original work published 2003).
- "Le fédéralisme dans tous ses états", textes réunis par Pierre du Bois et Dieter Freiburghaus, Revue d’Allemagne et des pays de langue allemande, t. 35, n° 3, 2003, pp. 305–428.
- "Anciennes et nouvelles menaces : les enjeux de la sécurité en Europe", Relations internationales, n° 125, 2006, pp. 1–16.
- "L’évolution de la guerre idéologique entre l’Est et l’Ouest de 1975 à 1991", in Vincent Chetail (dir), Conflits, sécurité et coopération, Liber Amicorum Victor-Yves Ghebali, Bruxelles, Bruylant, 2007, pp. 75–103.
- "Cold War, culture and propaganda, 1953 to 1975", in Wilfried Loth and Georges-Henri Soutou (eds), The Making of détente, Eastern and Western Europe in the Cold War, 1965-75, London and New York, Routledge, 2008, pp. 9–24.
- Histoire de l'Europe monétaire (1945-2005) : Euro qui comme Ulysse..., Paris, PUF, 2008.
