= Steinhof =

- Former municipality
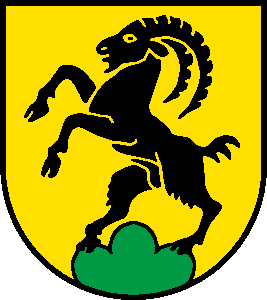
- Coat of arms
- Location of Steinhof
- Location within Switzerland Location within Canton of Solothurn
- Coordinates: 47°10′N 7°41′E
- Country: Switzerland
- Canton: Solothurn
- District: Wasseramt

Area
  - Total: 1.64 km^{2} (0.63 sq mi)
- Elevation: 562 m (1,844 ft)

Population (December 2010)
  - Total: 141
  - Density: 86.0/km^{2} (223/sq mi)
- Time zone: UTC+01:00 (CET)
  - Summer (DST): UTC+02:00 (CEST)
- Postal code: 4556
- SFOS number: 2531
- ISO 3166 code: CH-SO
- Surrounded by: Bollodingen (BE), Hermiswil (BE), Oberönz (BE), Seeberg (BE)
- Website: www.steinhof-so.ch

Steinhof is a former municipality in the district of Wasseramt in the canton of Solothurn in Switzerland. It is an enclave in the canton of Bern. The municipality of Steinhof merged on 1 January 2012 into the municipality of Aeschi.

== History ==
Steinhof is first mentioned in 1201 as Heinricus de Steine. It was first mentioned as Steinhof in 1766.

== Geography ==
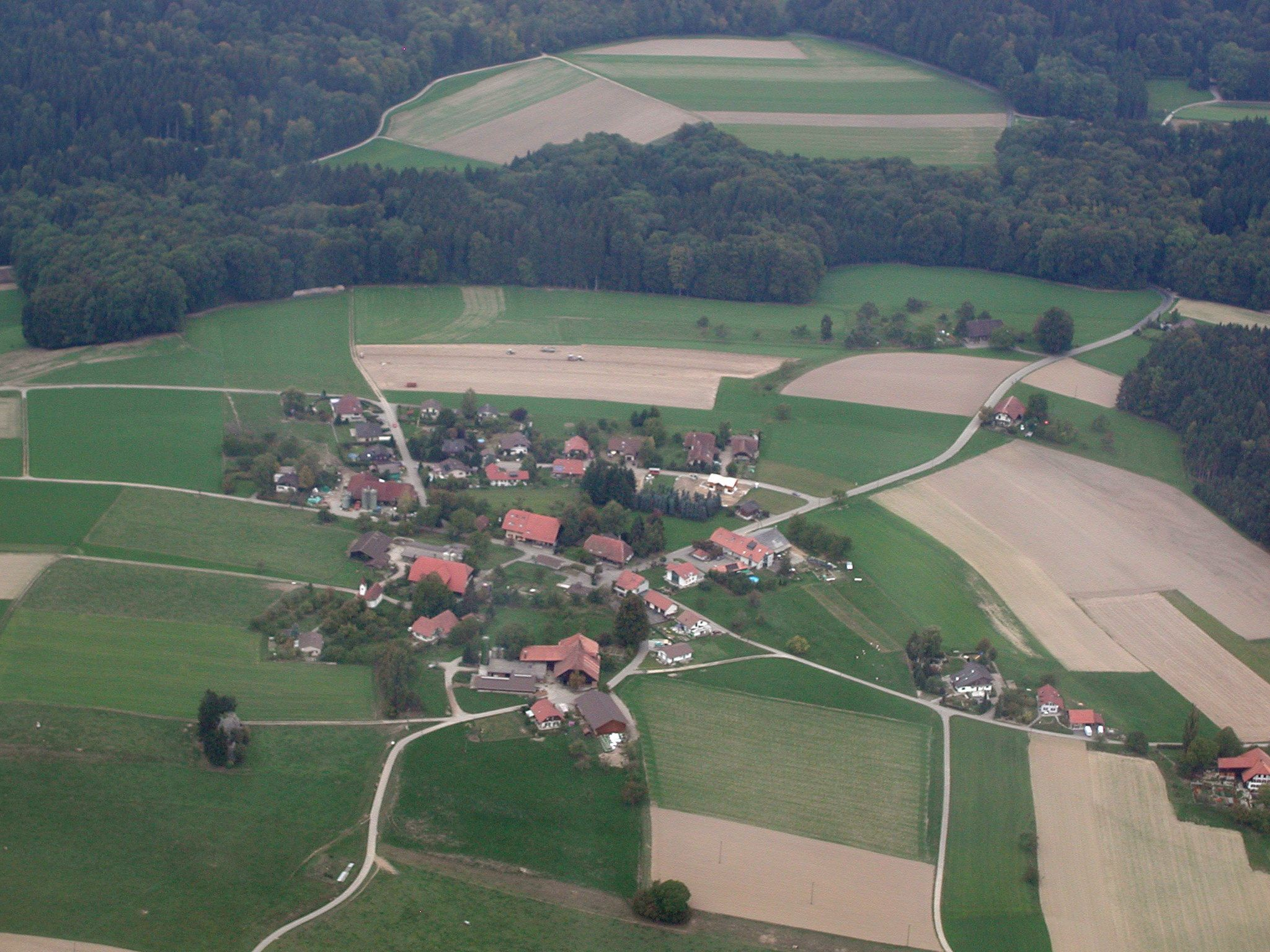
Aerial view

Steinhof had an area, as of 2009, of 1.64 square kilometers (0.63 sq mi). Of this area, 1.04 km^{2} (0.40 sq mi) or 63.4% is used for agricultural purposes, while 0.48 km^{2} (0.19 sq mi) or 29.3% is forested. Of the rest of the land, 0.1 km^{2} (25 acres) or 6.1% is settled (buildings or roads), 0.01 km^{2} (2.5 acres) or 0.6% is either rivers or lakes.

Of the built up area, housing and buildings made up 3.7% and transportation infrastructure made up 2.4%. Out of the forested land, all of the forested land area is covered with heavy forests. Of the agricultural land, 37.2% is used for growing crops and 24.4% is pastures, while 1.8% is used for orchards or vine crops. All the water in the municipality is flowing water.

The municipality is located in the Wasseramt district. The village is an exclave of Solothurn and is surrounded by the Canton of Bern.

== Coat of arms ==
The blazon of the municipal coat of arms is Or an Ibex rampant Sable on a Mount of 3 Coupeaux Vert.

== Demographics ==
Steinhof had a population (as of 2010) of 141. As of 2008, 4.6% of the population are resident foreign nationals. Over the last 10 years (1999–2009) the population has changed at a rate of 9.2%. It has changed at a rate of 10.8% due to migration and at a rate of 2.3% due to births and deaths.

Most of the population (as of 2000) speaks German (142 or 99.3%) with the rest speaking French

As of 2008, the gender distribution of the population was 45.4% male and 54.6% female. The population was made up of 62 Swiss men (44.0% of the population) and 2 (1.4%) non-Swiss men. There were 74 Swiss women (52.5%) and 3 (2.1%) non-Swiss women. Of the population in the municipality 64 or about 44.8% were born in Steinhof and lived there in 2000. There were 35 or 24.5% who were born in the same canton, while 38 or 26.6% were born somewhere else in Switzerland, and 3 or 2.1% were born outside of Switzerland.

In 2008 there was 1 live birth to Swiss citizens. Ignoring immigration and emigration, the population of Swiss citizens increased by 1 while the foreign population remained the same. The total Swiss population change in 2008 (from all sources, including moves across municipal borders) was an increase of 3 and the non-Swiss population increased by 1 people. This represents a population growth rate of 2.7%.

The age distribution, as of 2000, in Steinhof is; 11 children or 7.7% of the population are between 0 and 6 years old and 38 teenagers or 26.6% are between 7 and 19. Of the adult population, 6 people or 4.2% of the population are between 20 and 24 years old. 36 people or 25.2% are between 25 and 44, and 27 people or 18.9% are between 45 and 64. The senior population distribution is 20 people or 14.0% of the population are between 65 and 79 years old and there are 5 people or 3.5% who are over 80.

As of 2000, there were 60 people who were single and never married in the municipality. There were 79 married individuals, 3 widows or widowers and 1 individuals who are divorced.

As of 2000 the average number of residents per living room was 0.64 which is more people per room than the cantonal average of 0.56 per room. In this case, a room is defined as space of a housing unit of at least 4 m^{2} (43 sq ft) as normal bedrooms, dining rooms, living rooms, kitchens and habitable cellars and attics. About 74.4% of the total households were owner occupied, or in other words did not pay rent (though they may have a mortgage or a rent-to-own agreement).

As of 2000, there were 46 private households in the municipality, and an average of 3.1 persons per household. There were 7 households that consist of only one person and 8 households with five or more people. Out of a total of 46 households that answered this question, 15.2% were households made up of just one person. Of the rest of the households, there are 13 married couples without children, 24 married couples with children There were 2 single parents with a child or children.

In 2000 there were 23 single family homes (or 59.0% of the total) out of a total of 39 inhabited buildings. There were 2 multi-family buildings (5.1%), along with 12 multi-purpose buildings that were mostly used for housing (30.8%) and 2 other use buildings (commercial or industrial) that also had some housing (5.1%). Of the single family homes 4 were built before 1919, while 2 were built between 1990 and 2000. The greatest number of single family homes (8) were built between 1981 and 1990.

In 2000 there were 49 apartments in the municipality. The most common apartment size was 4 rooms of which there were 17. There were 1 single room apartments and 24 apartments with five or more rooms. Of these apartments, a total of 43 apartments (87.8% of the total) were permanently occupied, while 4 apartments (8.2%) were seasonally occupied and 2 apartments (4.1%) were empty. As of 2009, the construction rate of new housing units was 14.1 new units per 1000 residents. The vacancy rate for the municipality, in 2010, was 0%.

The historical population is given in the following chart:

== Politics ==
In the 2007 federal election the most popular party was the SVP which received 26.29% of the vote. The next three most popular parties were the CVP (22.07%), the SP (19.25%) and the FDP (15.26%). In the federal election, a total of 63 votes were cast, and the voter turnout was 56.8%.

== Economy ==
As of 2010, Steinhof had an unemployment rate of 5.2%. As of 2008, there were 19 people employed in the primary economic sector and about 4 businesses involved in this sector. 5 people were employed in the secondary sector and there was 1 business in this sector. 3 people were employed in the tertiary sector, with 1 business in this sector. There were 66 residents of the municipality who were employed in some capacity, of which females made up 42.4% of the workforce.

In 2008 the total number of full-time equivalent jobs was 20. The number of jobs in the primary sector was 15, of which 7 were in agriculture and 8 were in forestry or lumber production. The number of jobs in the secondary sector was 3, all of which were in manufacturing. The number of jobs in the tertiary sector was 2, both in a hotel or restaurant.

In 2000, there were 4 workers who commuted into the municipality and 49 workers who commuted away. The municipality is a net exporter of workers, with about 12.3 workers leaving the municipality for every one entering. Of the working population, 16.7% used public transportation to get to work, and 51.5% used a private car.

== Religion ==
From the 2000 census, 86 or 60.1% were Roman Catholic, while 43 or 30.1% belonged to the Swiss Reformed Church. 10 (or about 6.99% of the population) belonged to no church, are agnostic or atheist, and 4 individuals (or about 2.80% of the population) did not answer the question.

== Education ==
In Steinhof about 52 or (36.4%) of the population have completed non-mandatory upper secondary education, and 18 or (12.6%) have completed additional higher education (either university or a Fachhochschule). Of the 18 who completed tertiary schooling, 50.0% were Swiss men, 44.4% were Swiss women.

As of 2000, there were 34 students from Steinhof who attended schools outside the municipality.
