= Hermiswil =

- Former municipality
- Flag Coat of arms
- Location of Hermiswil
- Location within Switzerland Location within Canton of Bern
- Coordinates: 47°9′N 7°42′E
- Country: Switzerland
- Canton: Bern
- District: Oberaargau

Area
  - Total: 1.1 km^{2} (0.42 sq mi)
- Elevation: 494 m (1,621 ft)

Population (Dec 2014)
  - Total: 102
  - Density: 93/km^{2} (240/sq mi)
- Time zone: UTC+01:00 (CET)
  - Summer (DST): UTC+02:00 (CEST)
- Postal code: 3475
- SFOS number: 978
- ISO 3166 code: CH-BE
- Surrounded by: Bollodingen, Ochlenberg, Seeberg, Steinhof (SO)
- Website: SFSO statistics

Hermiswil is a former municipality in the Oberaargau administrative district in the canton of Bern in Switzerland. On 1 January 2016 it merged into the municipality of Seeberg.

== History ==
Hermiswil is first mentioned in 1289 as Hermanswile.

During the 13th and 14th centuries, the Hermiswil area had been granted by the Kyburg family to the vom Stein family. In 1466 the city of Solothurn inherited all the vom Stein holdings, which included Hermiswil. Following the Wyniger Vertrag, of 1665, the village was given to Bern. It was placed under the authority for low justice from Bollodingen and administered by the Landvogtei of Wangen. The Roman Catholic citizens of Hermiswil were placed under the guidance of the Reformed parish of Herzogenbuchsee.

While the village is located along two transportation routes (the road from Bern into the Aargau, and since 1857 the rail line from Olten to Bern) it has remained a small farming community.

== Geography ==
Heimiswil has an area, as of 2009, of 23.35 km^{2} (9.02 sq mi). In this area, 14.27 km^{2} (5.51 sq mi) or 61.1% is used for agricultural purposes, while 7.88 km^{2} (3.04 sq mi) or 33.7% is forested. For the rest of the land, 1.18 km^{2} (0.46 sq mi) or 5.1% is settled (buildings or roads), 0.04 km^{2} (9.9 acres) or 0.2% is either rivers or lakes.

For the built up area, housing and buildings made up 3.0% and transportation infrastructure made up 1.7%. 32.6% of the total land area is heavily forested and 1.2% is covered with orchards or small clusters of trees. In

the agricultural land, 18.3% is used for growing crops and 40.7% is pastures, while 2.1% is used for orchards or vine crops. All the water in the municipality is in rivers and streams.

The village of Hermiswil is located in the Önz valley.

== Demographics ==
Hermiswil has a population (as of 2014) of 102. As of 2007, 3.2% of the population was made up of foreign nationals. Over the last 10 years the population has decreased at a rate of -8.7%. Most of the population (as of 2000) speaks German (99.0%), with other 1% speaking Rhaeto-romance.

In the 2007 election the most popular party was the SVP which received 41.1% of the vote. The next three most popular parties were the local small left-wing parties (17.9%), the SPS (13.7%) and the Green Party (10.1%).

The age distribution of the population (as of 2000) is children and teenagers (0–19 years old) make up 23.8% of the population, while adults (20–64 years old) make up 63.4% and seniors (over 64 years old) make up 12.9%. The entire Swiss population is generally well educated. In Hermiswil about 82.5% of the population (between age 25-64) have completed either non-mandatory upper secondary education or additional higher education (either university or a Fachhochschule).

Hermiswil has an unemployment rate of 0.94%. As of 2005, there were 14 people employed in the primary economic sector and about 5 businesses involved in this sector. 2 people are employed in the secondary sector and there are 1 business in this sector. 20 people are employed in the tertiary sector, with 4 businesses in this sector. The historical population is given in the following table:

year	population
1764	74
1850	155
1900	112
1950	101
2000	101
