= Rütschelen =

- Municipality
- Flag Coat of arms
- Location of Rütschelen
- Location within Switzerland Location within Canton of Bern
- Coordinates: 47°10′N 7°47′E
- Country: Switzerland
- Canton: Bern
- District: Oberaargau

Area
  - Total: 4.0 km^{2} (1.5 sq mi)
- Elevation: 545 m (1,788 ft)

Population (December 2020)
  - Total: 564
  - Density: 140/km^{2} (370/sq mi)
- Time zone: UTC+01:00 (CET)
  - Summer (DST): UTC+02:00 (CEST)
- Postal code: 4933
- SFOS number: 340
- ISO 3166 code: CH-BE
- Surrounded by: Bleienbach, Leimiswil, Lotzwil, Madiswil, Ochlenberg
- Website: www.ruetschelen.ch

Rütschelen is a municipality in the Oberaargau administrative district in the canton of Bern in Switzerland.

== History ==
Rütschelen is first mentioned in 1273 as Ruschole.

Rütschelen ruled by the Counts of Kyburg, though St. Urban's Abbey and the Thunstetten Commandery were also important landholders. In 1385, the low court was pledged to the Rohrmoos and Mattstetten families, former Kyburg Ministerialis (unfree knights in the service of a feudal overlord) families. However, in the following decades they were forced, in turn, to pledge the low court to the town of Burgdorf in 1394 and 1402. In 1400 Burgdorf acquired some neighboring land from Goetz von Hünenberg and later combined both into a single part of the bailiwick of Lotzwil.

Around 1600, the village divided up the common land to make private land. Then, in 1616, a shared grazing agreement between Bleienbach and Wil was abolished. This loss of common grazing land hurt many farmers economically and throughout the 17th and 18th centuries they fought among themselves and against the village council for the use of the remaining common land. Starting in the 18th century, cottage industries such as linen weaving and stocking knitting began to supplement the local economy. After 1850, agriculture became increasingly mechanized and required fewer farm workers. The resulting lack of jobs forced many residents to migrate to the cities. Agriculture remains very important and in 2005, over half of all jobs in Rütschelen were in that sector.

== Geography ==
Rütschelen has an area of 3.98 km^{2} (1.54 sq mi). Of this area, 2.24 km^{2} (0.86 mi^{2}) or 56.3% is used for agricultural purposes, while 1.47 km^{2} (0.57 mi^{2}) or 36.9% is forested. Of the rest of the land, 0.28 km^{2} (0.11 mi^{2}) or 7.0% is settled (buildings or roads).

Of the built up area, housing and buildings made up 5.3% and transportation infrastructure made up 1.3%. Out of the forested land, 35.4% of the total land area is heavily forested and 1.5% is covered with orchards or small clusters of trees. Of the agricultural land, 38.2% is used for growing crops and 16.8% is pastures, while 1.3% is used for orchards or vine crops.

The municipality is located on the western edge of the Langeten valley. It consists of the linear village of Rütschelen with the village sections of Dorf, Flösch, Wil and Spiegelberg, the new development of Berg and scattered farm houses.

On 31 December 2009 Amtsbezirk Aarwangen, the municipality's former district, was dissolved. On the following day, 1 January 2010, it joined the newly created Verwaltungskreis Oberaargau.

== Coat of arms ==
The blazon of the municipal coat of arms is Per fess Argent a Semi Bear rampant issuant Sable langued Gules and of the last.

== Demographics ==
Rütschelen has a population (as of December 2020) of 564. As of 2010, 3.1% of the population are resident foreign nationals. Over the last 10 years (2000-2010) the population has changed at a rate of 4.9%. Migration accounted for 6%, while births and deaths accounted for -0.2%.

Most of the population (as of 2000) speaks German (525 or 99.1%) as their first language, with the rest speaking French or English.

As of 2008, the population was 48.8% male and 51.2% female. The population was made up of 271 Swiss men (46.9% of the population) and 11 (1.9%) non-Swiss men. There were 289 Swiss women (50.0%) and 7 (1.2%) non-Swiss women. Of the population in the municipality, 190 or about 35.8% were born in Rütschelen and lived there in 2000. There were 229 or 43.2% who were born in the same canton, while 77 or 14.5% were born somewhere else in Switzerland, and 19 or 3.6% were born outside of Switzerland.

As of 2010, children and teenagers (0–19 years old) make up 26% of the population, while adults (20–64 years old) make up 57.4% and seniors (over 64 years old) make up 16.6%.

As of 2000, there were 218 people who were single and never married in the municipality. There were 262 married individuals, 31 widows or widowers and 19 individuals who are divorced.

As of 2000, there were 47 households that consist of only one person and 18 households with five or more people. In 2000, a total of 196 apartments (84.1% of the total) were permanently occupied, while 30 apartments (12.9%) were seasonally occupied and 7 apartments (3.0%) were empty. As of 2010, the construction rate of new housing units was 3.5 new units per 1000 residents. The vacancy rate for the municipality, in 2011, was 1.6%.

The historical population is given in the following chart:

== Politics ==
In the 2011 federal election the most popular party was the SVP which received 39.3% of the vote. The next three most popular parties were the BDP Party (19.4%), the SPS (16%) and the FDP (8.2%). In the federal election, a total of 218 votes were cast, and the voter turnout was 49.5%.

== Economy ==
As of 2011, Rütschelen had an unemployment rate of 1.29%. As of 2008, there were a total of 73 people employed in the municipality. Of these, there were 40 people employed in the primary economic sector and about 13 businesses involved in this sector. 4 people were employed in the secondary sector and there were 3 businesses in this sector. 29 people were employed in the tertiary sector, with 8 businesses in this sector.

In 2008 there were a total of 51 full-time equivalent jobs. The number of jobs in the primary sector was 28, all of which were in agriculture. The number of jobs in the secondary sector was 4 of which 1 was in manufacturing and 3 were in construction. The number of jobs in the tertiary sector was 19. In the tertiary sector; 4 or 21.1% were in wholesale or retail sales or the repair of motor vehicles, 1 was in the movement and storage of goods, 3 or 15.8% were in a hotel or restaurant, 6 or 31.6% were technical professionals or scientists, 4 or 21.1% were in education.

In 2000, there were 15 workers who commuted into the municipality and 177 workers who commuted away. The municipality is a net exporter of workers, with about 11.8 workers leaving the municipality for every one entering. Of the working population, 5.7% used public transportation to get to work, and 58.4% used a private car.

== Religion ==
From the 2000 census, 33 or 6.2% were Roman Catholic, while 432 or 81.5% belonged to the Swiss Reformed Church. Of the rest of the population, there were 15 individuals (or about 2.83% of the population) who belonged to another Christian church. 34 (or about 6.42% of the population) belonged to no church, are agnostic or atheist, and 23 individuals (or about 4.34% of the population) did not answer the question.

== Education ==
In Rütschelen about 227 or (42.8%) of the population have completed non-mandatory upper secondary education, and 57 or (10.8%) have completed additional higher education (either university or a Fachhochschule). Of the 57 who completed tertiary schooling, 78.9% were Swiss men, 19.3% were Swiss women.

The Canton of Bern school system provides one year of non-obligatory Kindergarten, followed by six years of Primary school. This is followed by three years of obligatory lower Secondary school where the students are separated according to ability and aptitude. Following the lower Secondary students may attend additional schooling or they may enter an apprenticeship.

During the 2009-10 school year, there were a total of 48 students attending classes in Rütschelen. There was one kindergarten class with a total of 15 students in the municipality. The municipality had 2 primary classes and 33 students. There was one primary student who was a permanent or temporary resident of Switzerland (not a citizen).

As of 2000, there were 33 students from Rütschelen who attended schools outside the municipality.
