= Oberönz =

- Former municipality
- Flag Coat of arms
- Location of Oberönz
- Location within Switzerland Location within Canton of Bern
- Coordinates: 47°11′N 7°42′E
- Country: Switzerland
- Canton: Bern
- District: Wangen

Area
  - Total: 3.0 km^{2} (1.2 sq mi)
- Elevation: 465 m (1,526 ft)

Population (2007)
  - Total: 941
  - Density: 310/km^{2} (810/sq mi)
- Time zone: UTC+01:00 (CET)
  - Summer (DST): UTC+02:00 (CEST)
- Postal code: 3363
- SFOS number: 984
- ISO 3166 code: CH-BE
- Surrounded by: Aeschi (SO), Bettenhausen, Bollodingen, Herzogenbuchsee, Niederönz, Seeberg, Steinhof (SO)
- Website: www.oberoenz.ch

Oberönz was a municipality in the district of Wangen in the canton of Bern in Switzerland.

On January 1, 2008, the municipality of Oberönz became part of the municipality of Herzogenbuchsee.

== History ==
Oberönz is first mentioned in 1246 as Onza.

== Geography ==
Oberönz has an area of 3 km^{2} (1.2 sq mi). Of this area, 48.5% is used for agricultural purposes, while 37.8% is forested. The rest of the land, (13.7%) is settled.

== Demographics ==
Before the merger, Oberönz has a population of 941. As of 2007, 11.3% of the population was made up of foreign nationals. Over the last 10 years the population has grown at a rate of 8.2%. Most of the population (as of 2000) speaks German (90.8%), with Turkish being second most common (3.6%) and Albanian being third (2.3%).

In the 2007 election the most popular party was the SVP which received 35.2% of the vote. The next three most popular parties were the SPS (25.7%), the FDP (14.5%) and the Green Party (7.1%).

The age distribution of the population (as of 2000) is children and teenagers (0–19 years old) make up 23.8% of the population, while adults (20–64 years old) make up 61.4% and seniors (over 64 years old) make up 14.9%. The entire Swiss population is generally well educated. In Oberönz about 76.7% of the population (between age 25-64) have completed either non-mandatory upper secondary education or additional higher education (either University or a Fachhochschule).

Oberönz had an unemployment rate of 1.46%. As of 2005, there were 23 people employed in the primary economic sector and about 9 businesses involved in this sector. 187 people are employed in the secondary sector and there are 6 businesses in this sector. 39 people are employed in the tertiary sector, with 13 businesses in this sector. The historical population is given in the following table:

year	population
1764	254
1850	385
1900	327
1950	403
2000	880
