= Ochlenberg =

- Municipality
- Flag Coat of arms
- Location of Ochlenberg
- Location within Switzerland Location within Canton of Bern
- Coordinates: 47°9′N 7°44′E
- Country: Switzerland
- Canton: Bern
- District: Oberaargau

Area
  - Total: 12.1 km^{2} (4.7 sq mi)
- Elevation: 580 m (1,900 ft)

Population (December 2020)
  - Total: 563
  - Density: 46.5/km^{2} (121/sq mi)
- Time zone: UTC+01:00 (CET)
  - Summer (DST): UTC+02:00 (CEST)
- Postal code: 3367
- SFOS number: 985
- ISO 3166 code: CH-BE
- Surrounded by: Bleienbach, Bollodingen, Hermiswil, Leimiswil, Oeschenbach, Rütschelen, Seeberg, Thörigen, Ursenbach, Wynigen
- Website: https://www.ochlenberg.ch SFSO statistics

Ochlenberg is a municipality in the Oberaargau administrative district in the canton of Bern in Switzerland.

== History ==
Ochlenberg is first mentioned in 1612 as Ochliberg.

== Geography ==
Ochlenberg has an area, as of 2009, of 12.13 square kilometers (4.68 sq mi). Of this area, 7.61 km^{2} (2.94 sq mi) or 62.7% is used for agricultural purposes, while 3.93 km^{2} (1.52 sq mi) or 32.4% is forested. Of the rest of the land, 0.52 km^{2} (0.20 sq mi) or 4.3% is settled (buildings or roads), 0.02 km^{2} (4.9 acres) or 0.2% is either rivers or lakes.

Of the built up area, housing and buildings made up 2.5% and transportation infrastructure made up 1.7%. Out of the forested land, 31.3% of the total land area is heavily forested and 1.1% is covered with orchards or small clusters of trees. Of the agricultural land, 31.2% is used for growing crops and 29.2% is pastures, while 2.4% is used for orchards or vine crops. All the water in the municipality is in rivers and streams.

== Demographics ==
Ochlenberg has a population (as of 31 December 2020) of 563. As of 2007, 1.0% of the population was made up of foreign nationals. Over the last 10 years the population has decreased at a rate of -11.9%. Most of the population (as of 2000) speaks German (99.4%), with French being second most common ( 0.5%) and Russian being third ( 0.2%).

The age distribution of the population (as of 2000) is children and teenagers (0–19 years old) make up 25.6% of the population, while adults (20–64 years old) make up 54.3% and seniors (over 64 years old) make up 20.1%. In Ochlenberg about 79.9% of the population (between age 25-64) have completed either non-mandatory upper secondary education or additional higher education (either university or a Fachhochschule).

Ochlenberg has an unemployment rate of 0.55%. As of 2005, there were 212 people employed in the primary economic sector and about 67 businesses involved in this sector. 4 people are employed in the secondary sector and there are 3 businesses in this sector. 9 people are employed in the tertiary sector, with 4 businesses in this sector. The historical population is given in the following table:

year	population
1764	666
1850	1,093
1900	914
1950	839
2000	641
