= Bleienbach =

- Municipality
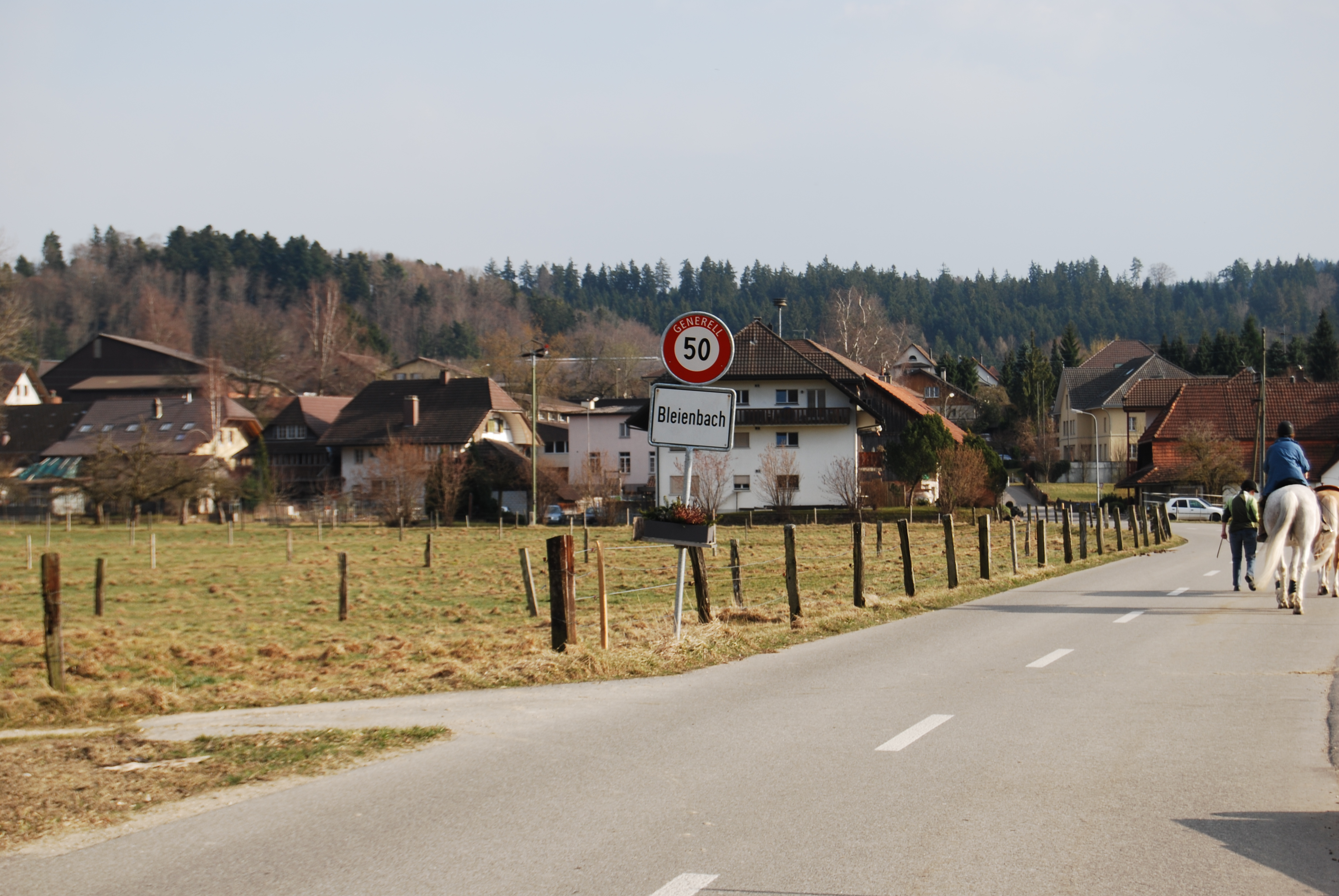
- The entrance to Bleienbach village

- Flag Coat of arms
- Location of Bleienbach
- Location within Switzerland Location within Canton of Bern
- Coordinates: 47°11′N 7°45′E
- Country: Switzerland
- Canton: Bern
- District: Oberaargau

Area
  - Total: 5.7 km^{2} (2.2 sq mi)
- Elevation: 483 m (1,585 ft)

Population (December 2020)
  - Total: 734
  - Density: 130/km^{2} (330/sq mi)
- Time zone: UTC+01:00 (CET)
  - Summer (DST): UTC+02:00 (CEST)
- Postal code: 3368
- SFOS number: 324
- ISO 3166 code: CH-BE
- Surrounded by: Langenthal, Lotzwil, Ochlenberg, Rütschelen, Thörigen, Thunstetten
- Website: www.bleienbach.ch

Bleienbach is a municipality in the Oberaargau administrative district in the canton of Bern in Switzerland.

== History ==
Bleienbach is first mentioned in 1194 as Blaichinbach.

Evidence of prehistoric settlements near Bleienbach include a Hallstatt grave mound in Oberbützberg, a High Medieval earthen fortress in Eggwald, and an ancient road near the village church. The low court and right to appoint priests to the village church were originally part of the Herrschaft of Langenstein-Grünenberg. In 1331 Johann of Aarwangen purchased a half share in the rights to the village. In 1432 some of the rights went to Bern. The remaining rights followed in either 1443 or 1455. Under Bernese control, the village was assigned to the bailiwick of Aarwangen. In 1826, fire destroyed the center of the village, though it was quickly rebuilt.

The first village church was, probably, a wooden church from the 8th or 9th centuries. It was replaced with a stone church built in the 9th or 10th century, which was first mentioned in 1194. That stone church was replaced by another church in the 13th century. The current building was built in 1732-34.

The local economy was traditionally based on local agriculture. In the 18th and 19th centuries, this was supplemented by the home weaving industry. The municipality's proximity to the Langenthal region inhibited industrialization but allowed many residents to become commuters to the factories in Langenthal. In 1935, a private airstrip for recreational flying opened outside the village.

== Geography ==
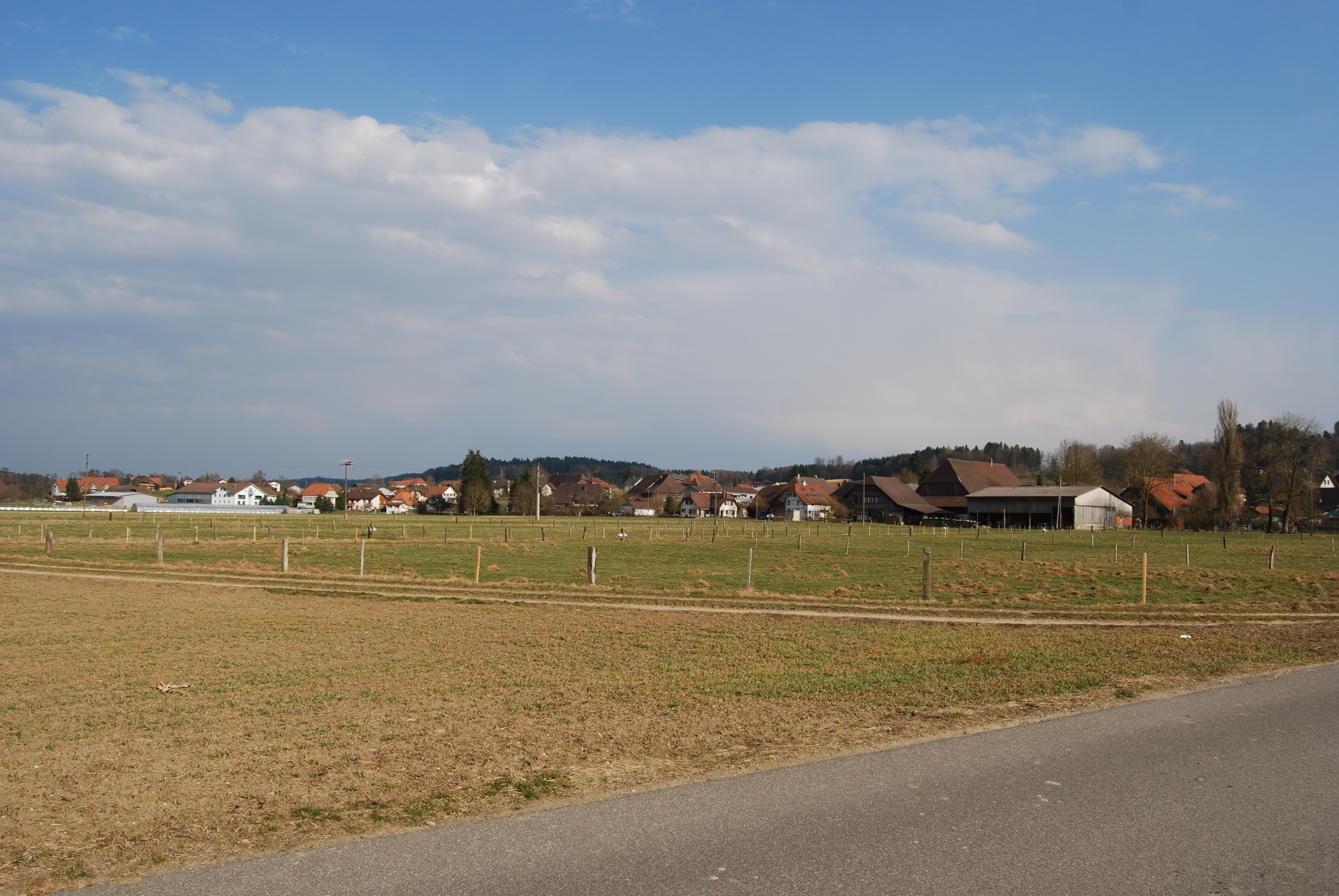
Countryside just outside Bleienbach village

Aerial view (1950)

Bleienbach has an area of 5.69 km^{2} (2.20 sq mi). Of this area, 3.25 km^{2} (1.25 mi^{2}) or 57.1% is used for agricultural purposes, while 1.88 km^{2} (0.73 mi^{2}) or 33.0% is forested. Of the rest of the land, 0.47 km^{2} (0.18 mi^{2}) or 8.3% is settled (buildings or roads), 0.09 km^{2} (22 acres) or 1.6% is either rivers or lakes.

Of the built up area, housing and buildings made up 3.5% and transportation infrastructure made up 4.2%. Out of the forested land, all of the forested land area is covered with heavy forests. Of the agricultural land, 41.1% is used for growing crops and 14.6% is pastures, while 1.4% is used for orchards or vine crops. Of the water in the municipality, 0.7% is in lakes and 0.9% is in rivers and streams.

The municipality consists of the village of Bleienbach and the hamlet of Oberbützberg.

On 31 December 2009 Amtsbezirk Aarwangen, the municipality's former district, was dissolved. This was followed by the municipality joining the new Verwaltungskreis Oberaargau on 1 January 2010.

== Coat of arms ==
The blazon of the municipal coat of arms is Impalled Sable in chief a Fish embowed Argent and in base a Trefoil Vert and of the second a Bar of the first. This may be an example of canting arms since the German word Blei is a name for a type of fish, the Bream.

== Demographics ==
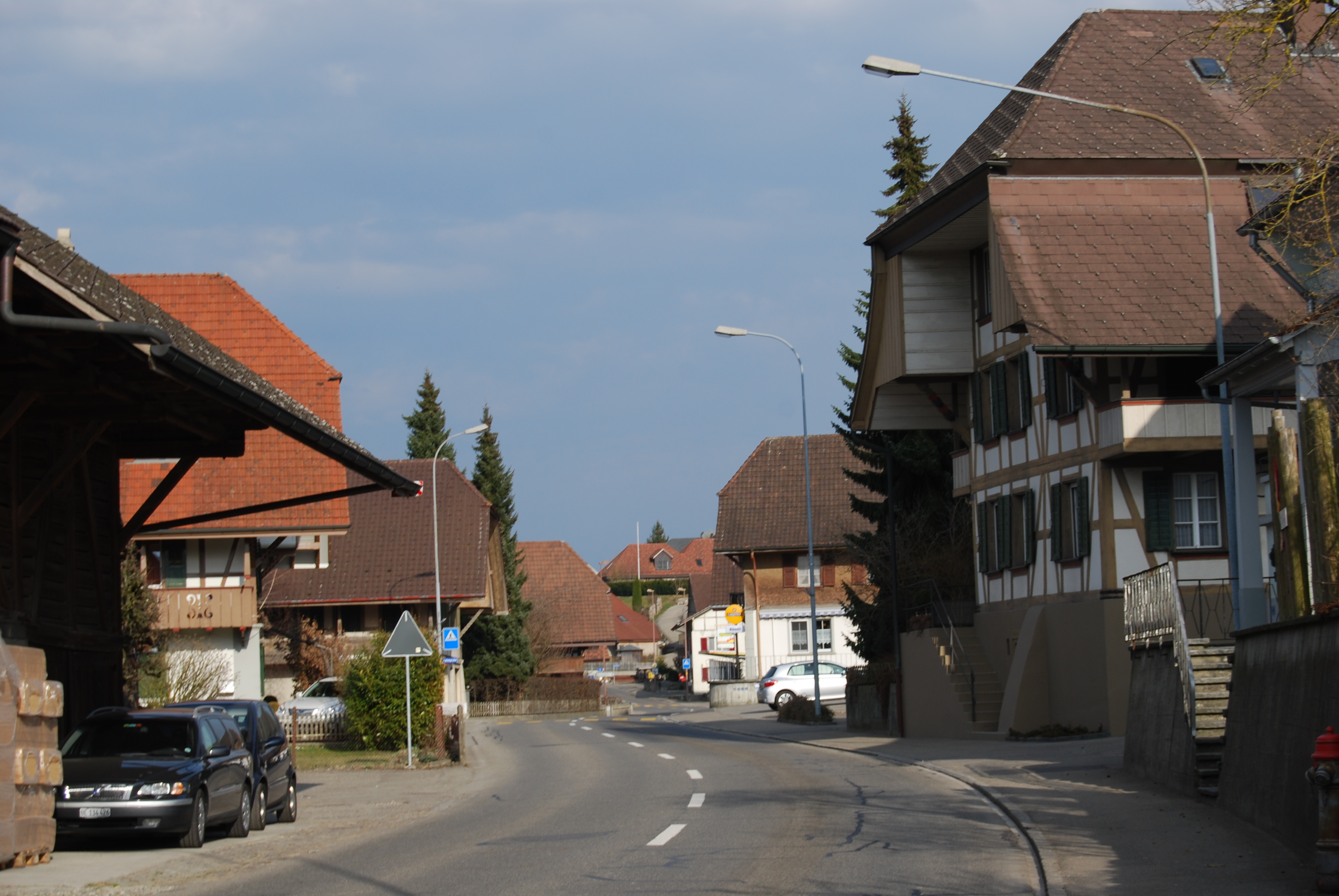
Bleienbach village

Bleienbach has a population (as of December 2020) of 734. As of 2010, 5.2% of the population are resident foreign nationals. Over the last 10 years (2000-2010) the population has changed at a rate of -7%. Migration accounted for 0.4%, while births and deaths accounted for -2.7%.

Most of the population (as of 2000) speaks German (691 or 95.7%) as their first language, Serbo-Croatian is the second most common (6 or 0.8%) and French is the third (5 or 0.7%). There are 5 people who speak Italian.

As of 2008, the population was 50.8% male and 49.2% female. The population was made up of 308 Swiss men (47.0% of the population) and 25 (3.8%) non-Swiss men. There were 313 Swiss women (47.8%) and 9 (1.4%) non-Swiss women. Of the population in the municipality, 265 or about 36.7% were born in Bleienbach and lived there in 2000. There were 297 or 41.1% who were born in the same canton, while 102 or 14.1% were born somewhere else in Switzerland, and 47 or 6.5% were born outside of Switzerland.

As of 2010, children and teenagers (0–19 years old) make up 16.3% of the population, while adults (20–64 years old) make up 65.6% and seniors (over 64 years old) make up 18%.

As of 2000, there were 308 people who were single and never married in the municipality. There were 361 married individuals, 35 widows or widowers and 18 individuals who are divorced.

As of 2000, there were 82 households that consist of only one person and 20 households with five or more people. In 2000, a total of 283 apartments (91.6% of the total) were permanently occupied, while 13 apartments (4.2%) were seasonally occupied and 13 apartments (4.2%) were empty. As of 2010, the construction rate of new housing units was 15.3 new units per 1000 residents. The vacancy rate for the municipality, in 2011, was 2.35%.

The historical population is given in the following chart:

== Sights ==
The entire village of Bleienbach is designated as part of the Inventory of Swiss Heritage Sites.

== Politics ==
In the 2011 federal election the most popular party was the SVP which received 47.1% of the vote. The next three most popular parties were the SPS (18.6%), the BDP Party (13%) and the FDP (6.4%). In the federal election, a total of 300 votes were cast, and the voter turnout was 55.7%.

== Economy ==
As of 2011, Bleienbach had an unemployment rate of 0.56%. As of 2008, there were a total of 646 people employed in the municipality. Of these, there were 51 people employed in the primary economic sector and about 19 businesses involved in this sector. 431 people were employed in the secondary sector and there were 13 businesses in this sector. 164 people were employed in the tertiary sector, with 18 businesses in this sector.

In 2008 there were a total of 569 full-time equivalent jobs. The number of jobs in the primary sector was 34, all of which were in agriculture. The number of jobs in the secondary sector was 415 of which 412 or (99.3%) were in manufacturing and 3 (0.7%) were in construction. The number of jobs in the tertiary sector was 120. In the tertiary sector; 7 or 5.8% were in wholesale or retail sales or the repair of motor vehicles, 2 or 1.7% were in the movement and storage of goods, 16 or 13.3% were in a hotel or restaurant, 47 or 39.2% were technical professionals or scientists, 7 or 5.8% were in education and 35 or 29.2% were in health care.

In 2000, there were 527 workers who commuted into the municipality and 252 workers who commuted away. The municipality is a net importer of workers, with about 2.1 workers entering the municipality for every one leaving. Of the working population, 7.8% used public transportation to get to work, and 56% used a private car.

== Religion ==
From the 2000 census, 73 or 10.1% were Roman Catholic, while 579 or 80.2% belonged to the Swiss Reformed Church. Of the rest of the population, there were 2 members of an Orthodox church (or about 0.28% of the population), and there were 16 individuals (or about 2.22% of the population) who belonged to another Christian church. There was 1 individual who was Jewish, and 10 (or about 1.39% of the population) who were Islamic. 39 (or about 5.40% of the population) belonged to no church, are agnostic or atheist, and 10 individuals (or about 1.39% of the population) did not answer the question.

== Education ==
In Bleienbach about 311 or (43.1%) of the population have completed non-mandatory upper secondary education, and 72 or (10.0%) have completed additional higher education (either university or a Fachhochschule). Of the 72 who completed tertiary schooling, 66.7% were Swiss men, 19.4% were Swiss women, 12.5% were non-Swiss men.

The Canton of Bern school system provides one year of non-obligatory Kindergarten, followed by six years of Primary school. This is followed by three years of obligatory lower Secondary school where the students are separated according to ability and aptitude. Following the lower Secondary students may attend additional schooling or they may enter an apprenticeship.

During the 2009-10 school year, there were a total of 44 students attending classes in Bleienbach. There was one kindergarten class with a total of 7 students in the municipality. Of the kindergarten students, 14.3% were permanent or temporary residents of Switzerland (not citizens) and 14.3% have a different mother language than the classroom language. The municipality had 2 primary classes and 37 students.

As of 2000, there were 3 students in Bleienbach who came from another municipality, while 38 residents attended schools outside the municipality.
