= Thörigen =

- Municipality
- Flag Coat of arms
- Location of Thörigen
- Location within Switzerland Location within Canton of Bern
- Coordinates: 47°10′N 7°44′E
- Country: Switzerland
- Canton: Bern
- District: Oberaargau

Area
  - Total: 4.5 km^{2} (1.7 sq mi)
- Elevation: 483 m (1,585 ft)

Population (December 2020)
  - Total: 1,156
  - Density: 260/km^{2} (670/sq mi)
- Time zone: UTC+01:00 (CET)
  - Summer (DST): UTC+02:00 (CEST)
- Postal code: 3367
- SFOS number: 989
- ISO 3166 code: CH-BE
- Surrounded by: Bettenhausen, Bleienbach, Bollodingen, Herzogenbuchsee, Ochlenberg, Thunstetten
- Website: www.thoerigen.ch

Thörigen is a municipality in the Oberaargau administrative district in the canton of Bern in Switzerland.

== Geography ==
Thörigen has an area of 4.5 km^{2} (1.7 sq mi). Of this area, 51.8% is used for agricultural purposes, while 36.3% is forested. Of the rest of the land, 11.5% is settled (buildings or roads) and the remainder (0.4%) is non-productive (rivers, glaciers or mountains).

== Demographics ==
Thörigen has a population (as of 31 December 2020) of 1,156. As of 2007, 4.2% of the population was made up of foreign nationals. Over the last 10 years the population has grown at a rate of 5.5%. Most of the population (as of 2000) speaks German (97.9%), with French being second most common ( 0.4%) and English being third ( 0.4%).

In the 2007 election the most popular party was the SVP which received 58.5% of the vote. The next three most popular parties were the FDP (11.7%), the SPS (11.3%) and the CSP (5.1%).

The age distribution of the population (as of 2000) is children and teenagers (0–19 years old) make up 23.3% of the population, while adults (20–64 years old) make up 62.3% and seniors (over 64 years old) make up 14.4%. In Thörigen about 76.4% of the population (between age 25-64) have completed either non-mandatory upper secondary education or additional higher education (either university or a Fachhochschule).

Thörigen has an unemployment rate of 0.73%. As of 2005, there were 60 people employed in the primary economic sector and about 19 businesses involved in this sector. 136 people are employed in the secondary sector and there are 17 businesses in this sector. 168 people are employed in the tertiary sector, with 31 businesses in this sector.
