= Simon Berger (artist) =

Swiss artist (born 1976)

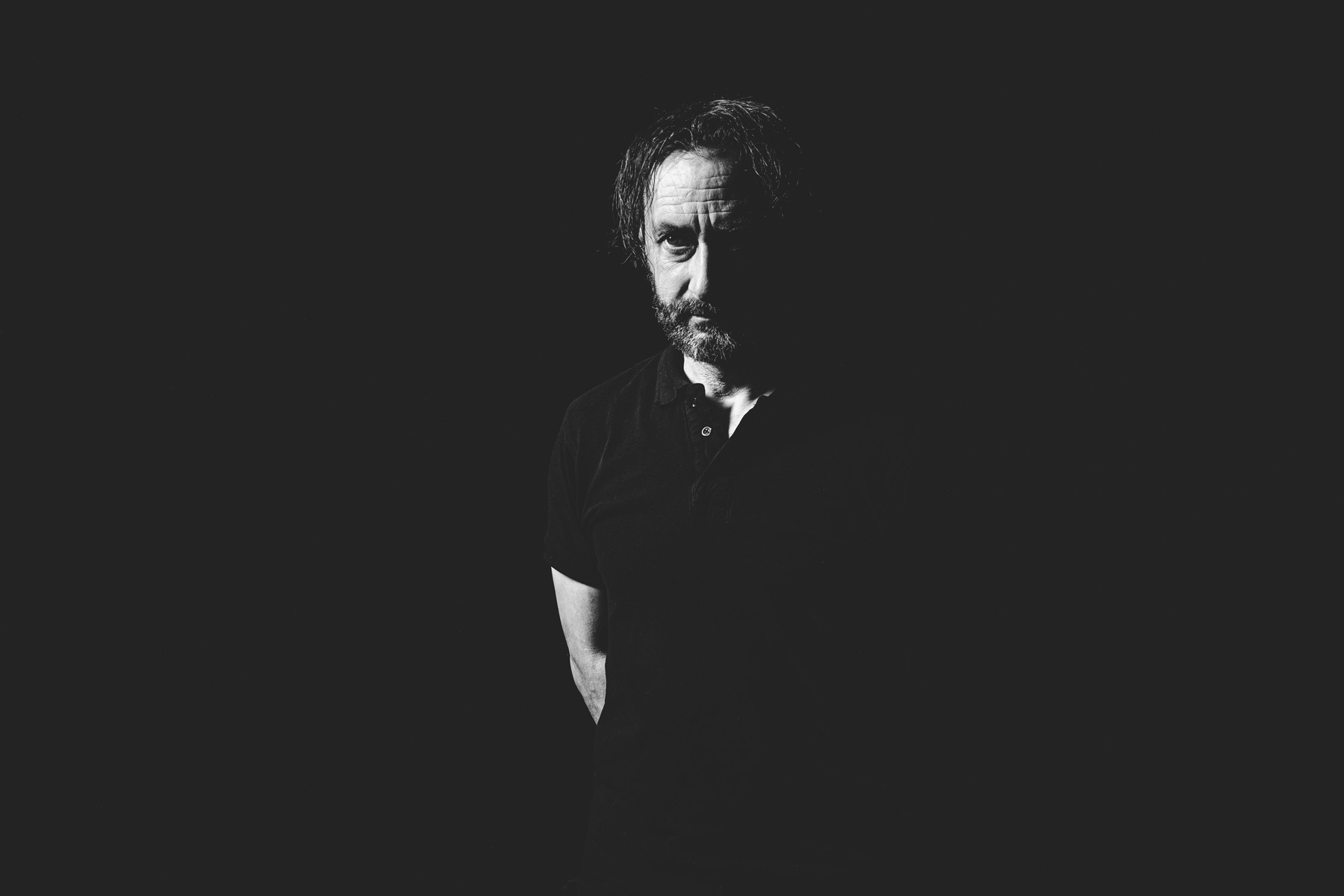
- Born: 9 April 1976 (age 50); Herzogenbuchsee, Switzerland
- Known for: Contemporary Art Installations, Contemporary Glass Art
- Notable work: Portrait of Kamala Harris; We Are Unbreakable; Shattering Beauty, Museo del Vetro Murano
- Movement: Pop Art / Contemporary Art
- Website: www.simonberger.art

Simon Berger (born 9 April 1976) is a Swiss contemporary visual artist. He is best known for pioneering the art made by breaking glass with a hammer. His work has been widely exhibited around the world.

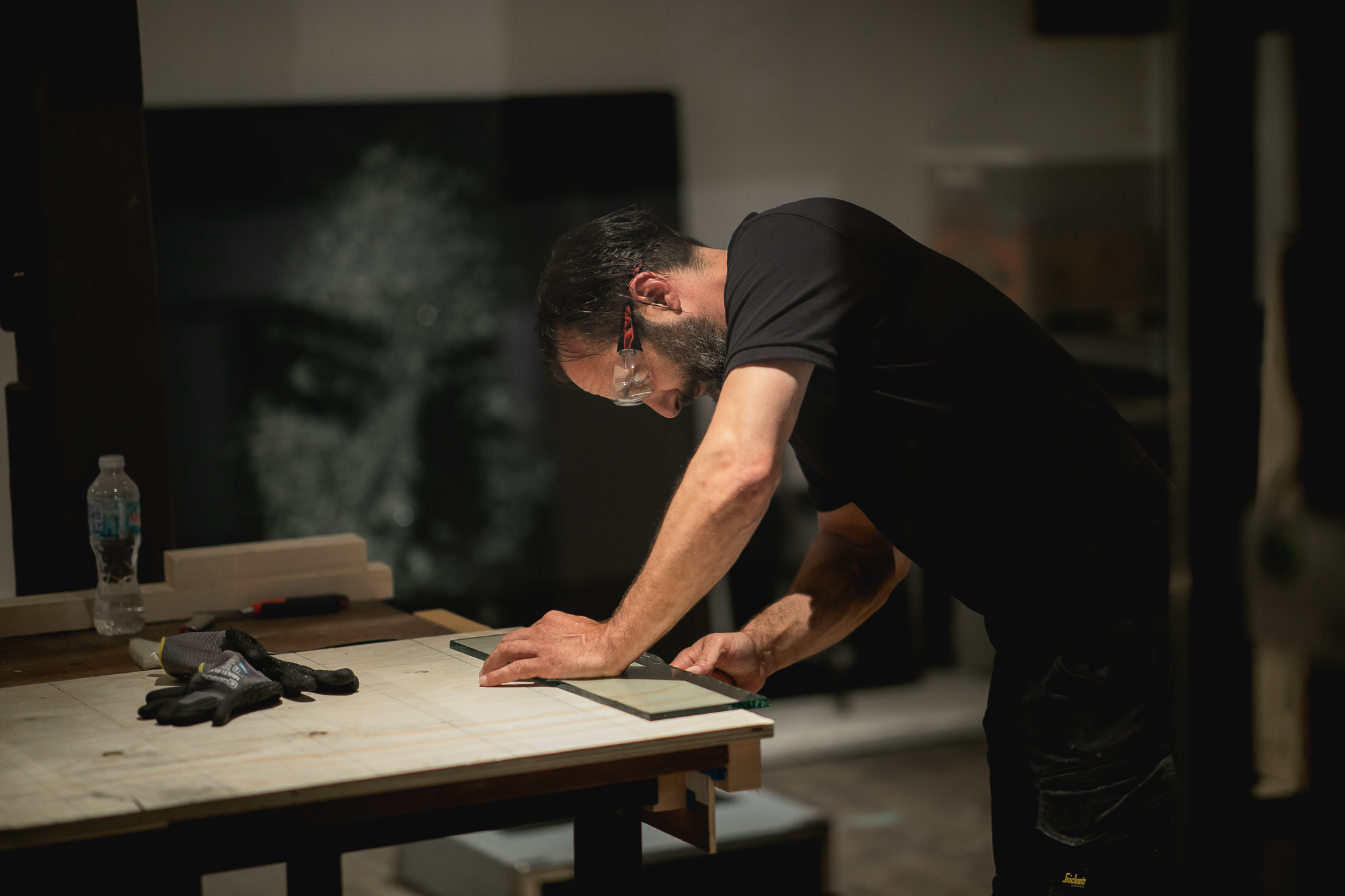
Simon Berger in the studio at Aurum Gallery, Bangkok

== Life ==
Berger was born on 9 April 1976. He grew up in Herzogenbuchsee, a municipality in the Oberaargau administrative district in the canton of Bern, Switzerland. Berger received professional training as a carpenter. He lives and works in his own studio in Niederönz.

== Artistry ==
Berger's glass portraits visualize a tension between strength and fragility through its motif, as well as his handling of the glass. The anonymous female portraits commonly share a powerful expression, their fierce gazes either piercing through the viewer, or fixating on an object beyond the frame. When approaching the artworks closely, these captivating images disintegrate into an amalgamation of cracks and jagged-edged shards of glass. Contrary to expectations of how glass should be handled cautiously to ensure its integrity, Berger makes use of the material's brittleness to develop his artistic language.

Reminiscent of sculptural techniques, a hammer is used to imprint the highlighted facial features into the sheet of glass. An initially transparent support of the image, the pane of glass, becomes partially opaque. The controlled shattering of the glass creates fractures which are subject to the material's physical laws. However, instead of collapsing into itself, the safety glass keeps the shards in place. These artworks fascinate by juxtaposing strength with fragility and expectations towards glass with Berger's approach to the material. The incidence of light is reflected by the fragments and cracks within the glass, making the artworks surface gleam and glisten and depending on the illumination, it seems as if the portrait itself were glowing. Through destruction, Berger allows beauty to emerge.

According to the French magazine RTS, Berger's work was influenced by the pop art movement and neorealism.

Berger made his first works on glass in 2017, in his studio in Niederönz, Switzerland. Soon, the originality of his technique put him in the media spotlight, and he was invited by many institutions or events such as the largest street art festival in Europe, the Street Art Fest Grenoble-Alpes, where he created a live diptych. The work can be seen in Grenoble at 113 cours Berriat in a window provided by the ARaymond company. In March 2021, Berger created a portrait of Kamala Harris, the Vice President of the United States, in partnership with the American National Museum of Women's History. In August 2021, he was associated with the "We are Unbreakable" project, sponsored by MTV Lebanon in tribute to the victims of the Beirut harbour explosion in 2020.

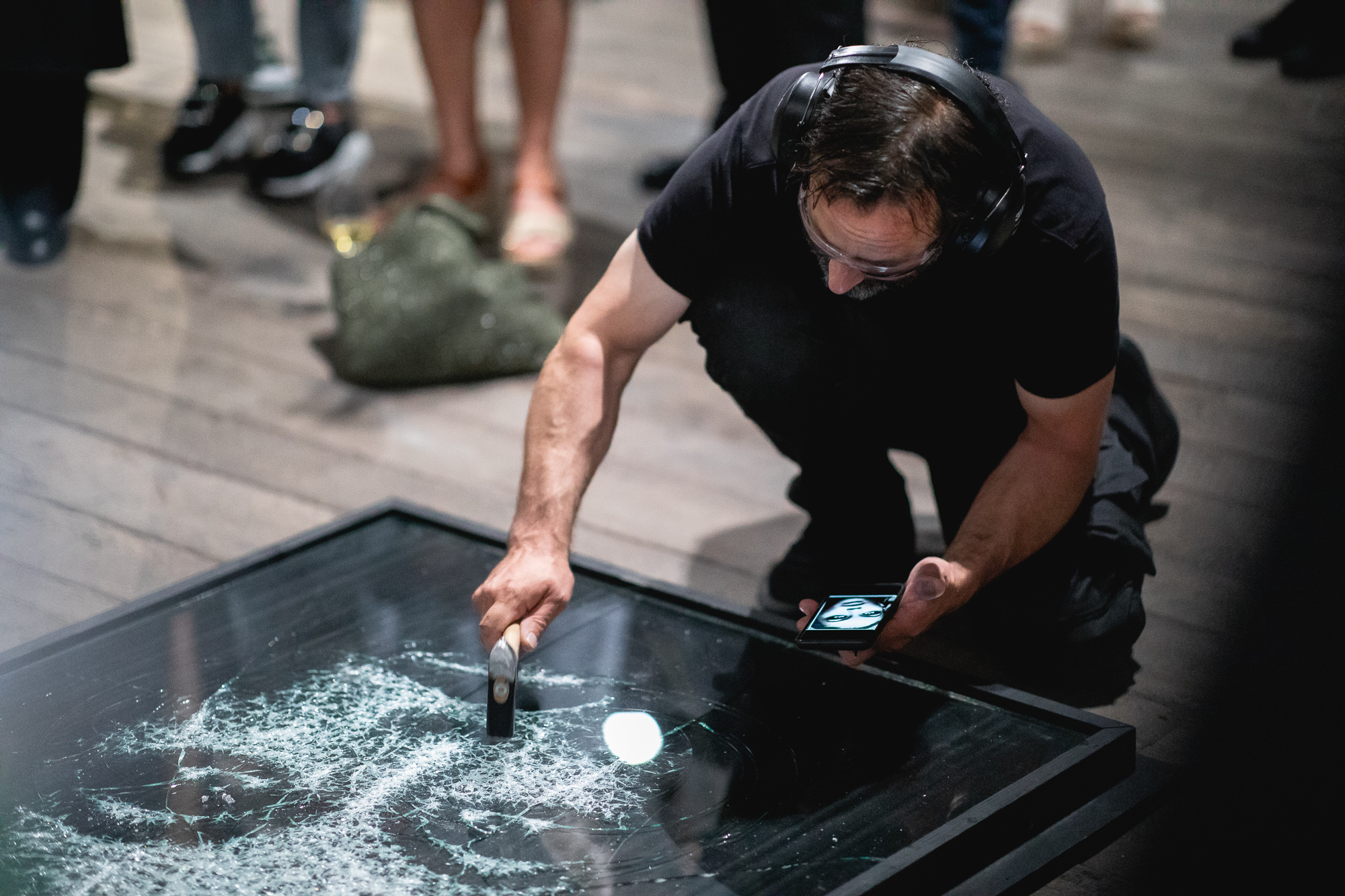
Simon Berger producing a new artwork in a live performance at Aurum Gallery, Bangkok

== Exhibitions ==
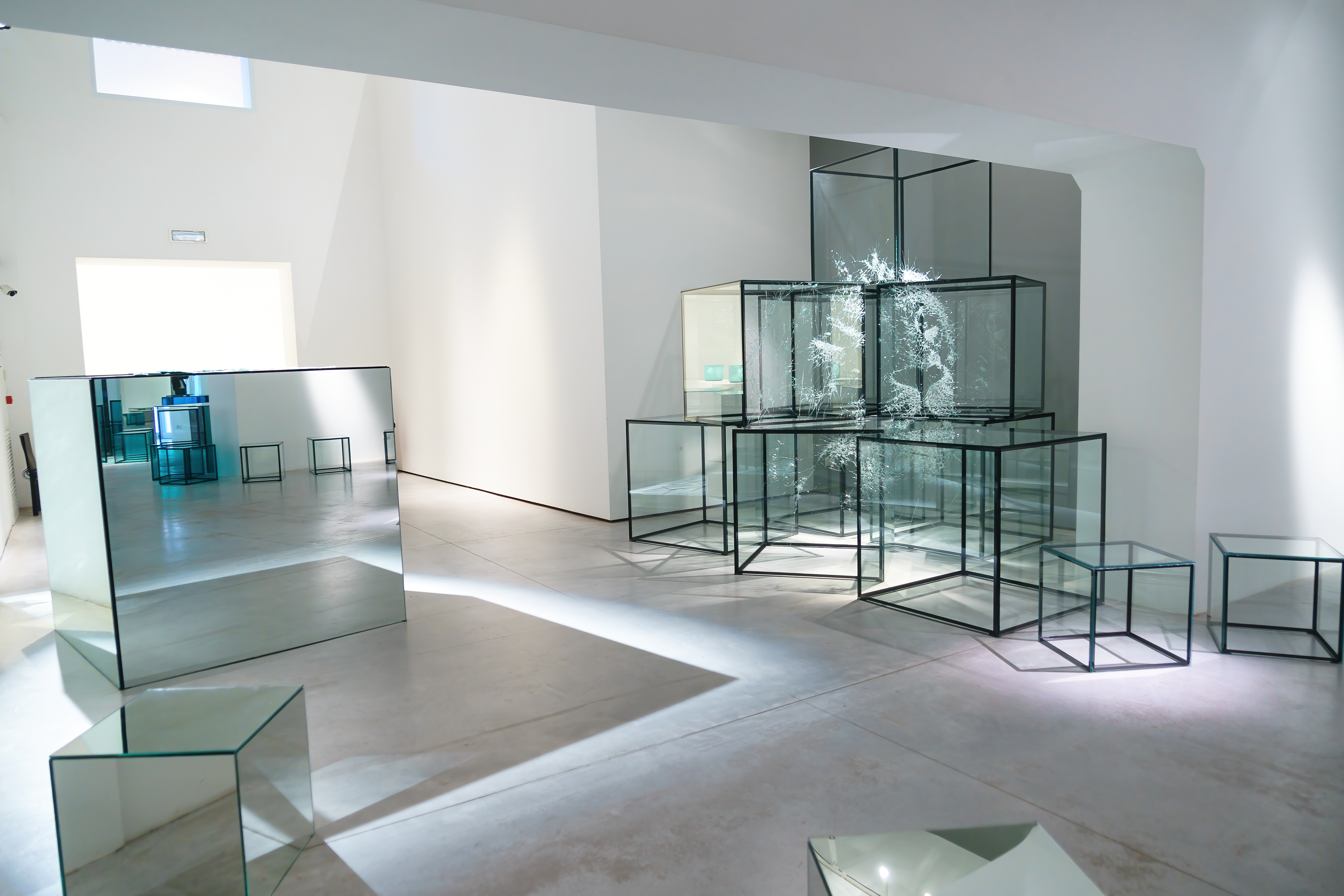
Shattering Beauty, solo exhibition at Museo del Vetro Murano, curated by Sandrine Welte and Chiara Squarcina, in collaboration with Berengo Studioc

Selected solo exhibitions:

- 2023 - Facing Grace, Museo Civico di Treviso, Treviso, Italy
- 2023 - Echoes, Fabien Castanier Gallery, Miami, United States
- 2023 - Beauty in Destruction, West Chelsea Contemporary, Austin, United States
- 2023 - Morphogenesis, Bundesverwaltungsgericht, St. Gallen, Switzerland
- 2023 - Reflected Identities, Gallotti & Radice, Milan, Italy
- 2023 - Untitled (solo exhibition and private event), Agence DS and Icone Gallery, Le Touquet-Paris-Plage, France
- 2023 - The Doors of Perception, Museo Civico di Sansepolcro, Italy
- 2023 - Shattering Beauty (curated by Sandrine Welte and Chiara Squarcina, in Collaboration with Berengo Studio), Museo del Vetro, Murano, Italy
- 2022 - Shattered, Aurum Gallery, Bangkok, Thailand
- 2022 - Unbreakable Identities, Galotti & Radice, Italy
- 2022 - Untitled, Agence DS, Paris, France
- 2022 - Untitled, Artstübli Basel, Switzerland
- 2022 - Le verre dans tous ses éclats, Vitromusée Romont, Switzerland
- 2022 - Cracked Beauties, Mazel Galerie, Brussels, Belgium
- 2021 - Simon Berger, Artstübli Gallery, Basel, Switzerland

Selected art fairs:

- 2023 - Laurent Marthaler Contemporary, Montreux, Switzerland, Art Miami 2023
- 2023 Artstübli Art & Culture, Basel, Switzerland, Volta Art Fair 2022 (Duo Show with Eddie Hara)
- 2022 - Laurent Marthaler Contemporary, Montreux, Switzerland, Art Miami 2022
- 2022 - Geneva Biennale, Sculpture Garden, Geneva, Switzerland
- 2021 - Laurent Marthaler Contemporary, Montreux, Switzerland, Art Miami 2021

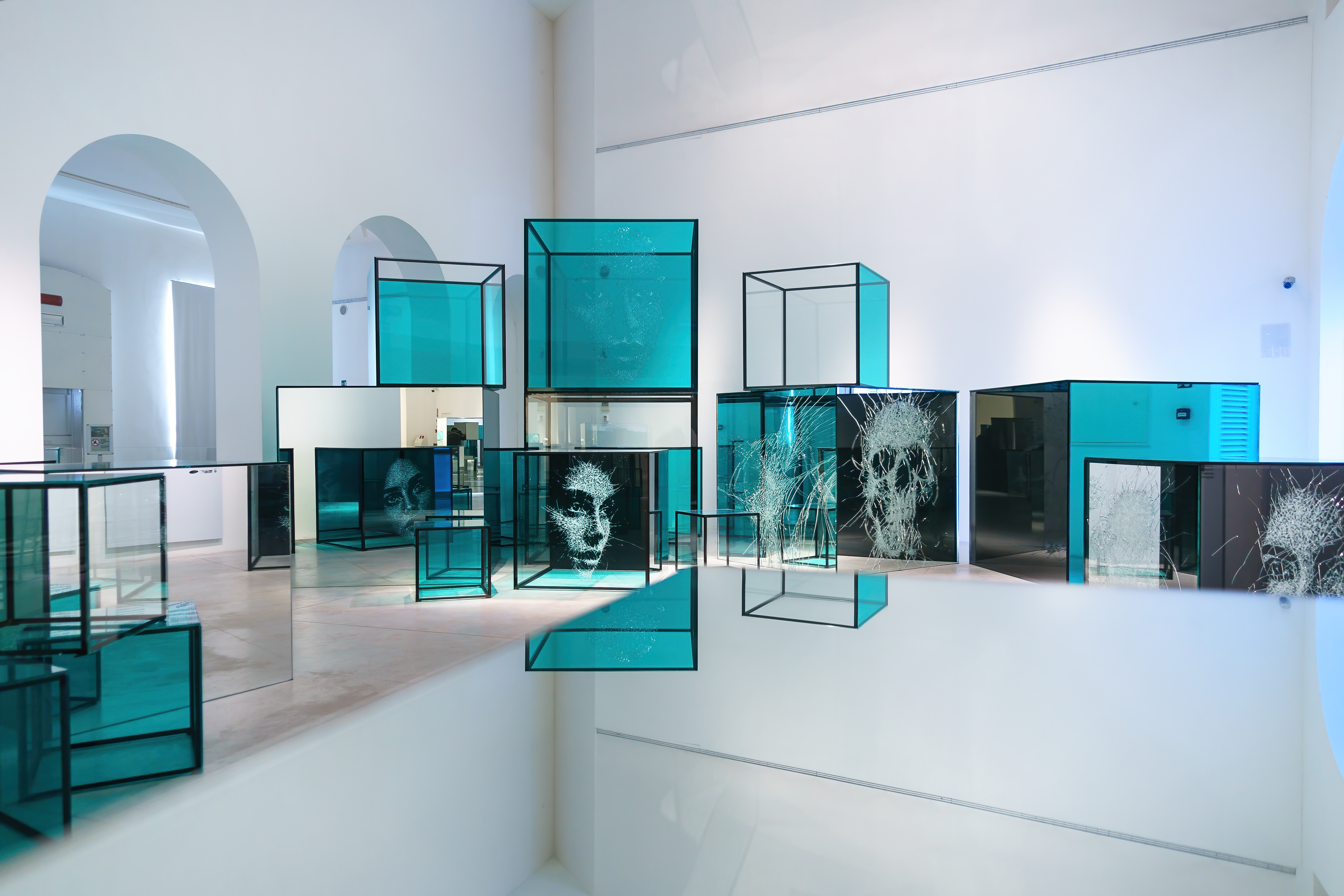
Shattering Beauty, solo exhibition at Museo del Vetro, curated by Sandrine Welte and Chiara Squarcina, in collaboration with Berengo Studio

Selected group exhibitions:

- 2022 - Duo Show, reFORMATION (with Pierre-Alain Münger), Frankonian Museum, Feuchtwangen, Germany
- 2022 - Group Exhibition, Glasstress, Fondazione Berengo, Venice, Italy
- 2022 - Duo Show, Defekt (with Pierre-Alain Münger), Artstübli Gallery, Basel, Switzerland
- 2022 - Group Exhibition, Sculpture Garden, Biennale Geneva, Geneva, Switzerland
- 2022 - Group Exhibition, MAMCO (Musée d’art moderne et contemporain), Geneva, Switzerland
- 2022 - Spring Break, Mazel Galerie, Brussels, Belgium
- 2022 - Glasstress - State of Mind, Fondazione Berengo, Murano, Venice, Italy (curated by Adriano Berengo, Koen Vanmechelen, Ludovico Pratesi)
- 2022 - L’Ancien Musée de Peinture, Grenoble, France^{[1]}
- 2022 - Break That Wall, Mazel Galerie, Brussels, Belgium

Selected public installations:

- 2023 - Tosca, Municipality of Paris and Agence DS, Paris, France
- 2023 - Réflexion Cristalline, La Villa Calvi and Agence DS, Corsica, France
- 2022 - Transformation, Artstübli Art & Culture, Basel, Switzerland
- 2022 - L’espoir, Street Art Festival Grenoble (curated by Jerome Catz), Permanent Installation, Grenoble, France
- 2022 - Untitled (front window), Spacejunk, Grenoble, France
- 2022 - Serpenti, BVLGARI, Zürich, Switzerland, curated by Florian Paul Koenig
- 2022 - Broken Lives, Ministry of Traffic Safety of France, Paris, France, curated by Laurent Marthaler, Laurent Marthaler Contemporary
- 2022 - Kamala Harris, Abraham Lincoln Memorial, United States, curated by Philipp Brogli, Artstübli
- 2021 - We are Unbreakable, MTV Lebanon, Beirut, Lebanon, curated by Laurent Marthaler (2021)
- 2021 - Untitled, Golf Course Ätigkofen, Switzerland
- 2020 - Abribus, Geneva, Switzerland, curated by Jean-Damien Zacchariotto
- 2020 - Untitled, Geneva, Switzerland, Promenade du Lac, curated by Jean-Damien Zacchariotto
- 2020 - Untitled (front window), Artstübli Gallery, Basel, Switzerland
- 2016 - E=mc2, Motorex, Langenthal, Switzerland

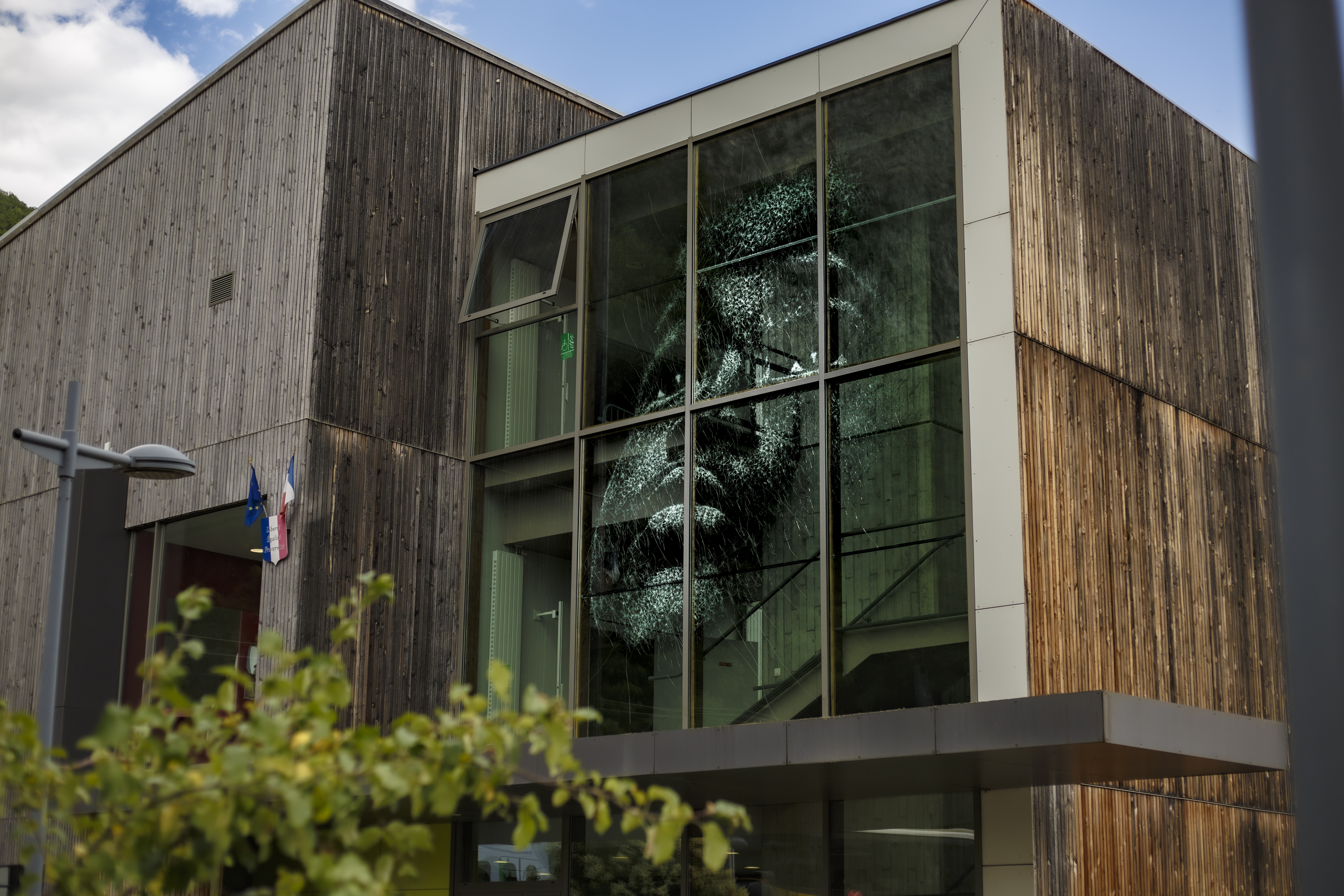
L'espoire, permanent installation at a school in Grenoble, in collaboration with Jerome Catz, Street Art Fest Grenoble

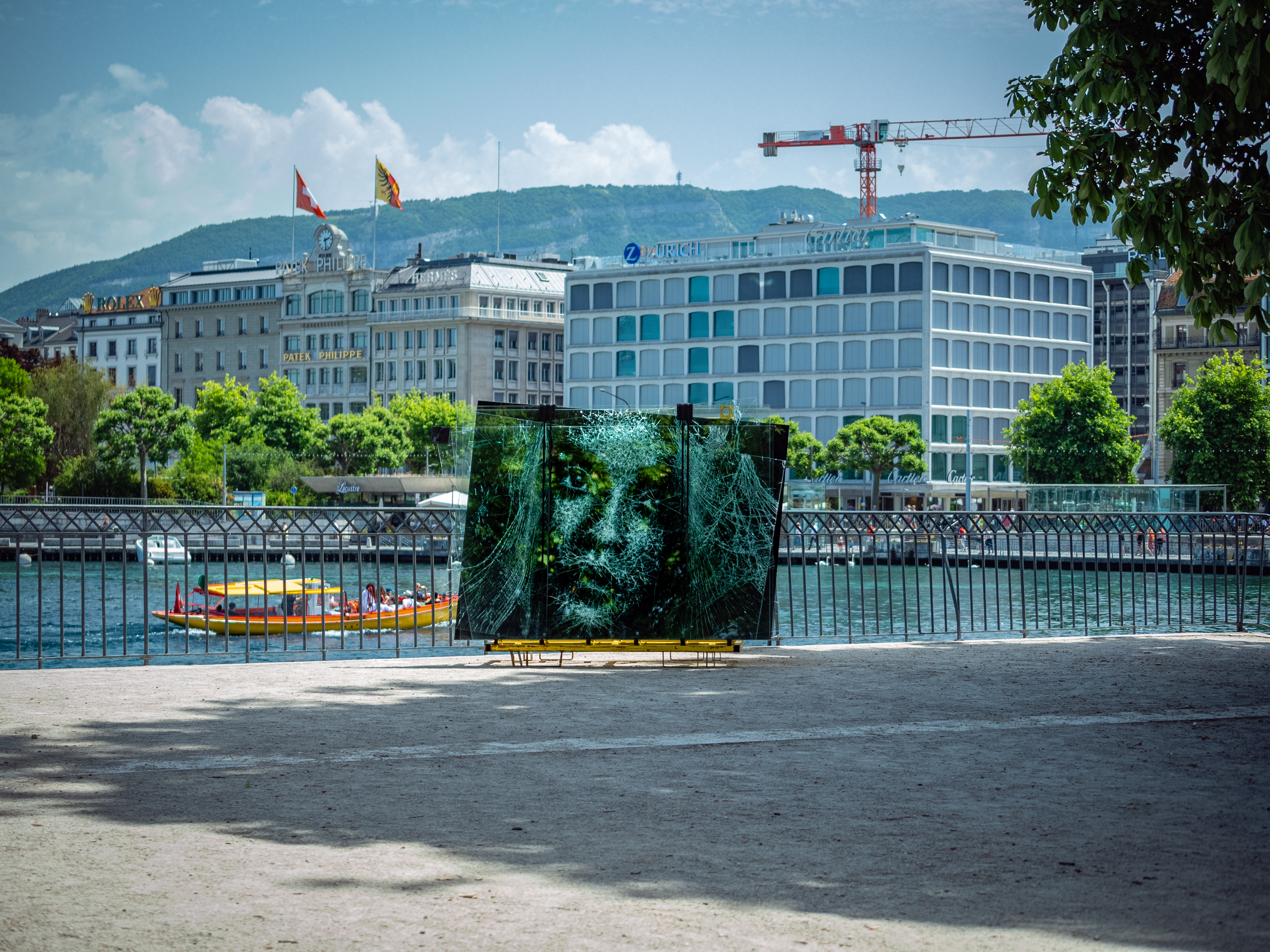
Artwork Morphogenesis at Sculpture Garden Biennale in Geneva, organized by Art Genève and MAMCO, in collaboration with BVLGARI

== Works in public and private collections ==
- Museo Civico di Sansepolcro, Sansepolcro, Italy
- Museo del Vetro, Murano, Italy
- Beit Beirut museum, Lebanon
- National Museum of Women's History in Washington, D.C., USA, Portrait of Kamala Harris
- Murten Museum, Switzerland
- Frankonian Museum, Feuchtwangen, Germany
- Vitromusée Romont, Switzerland
- Jessica Goldman Collection, Miami, USA
- Foundation Dr. Hanspeter & Christine Rentsch, Grenchen, Switzerland
- NOA Collection, Lucerne, Switzerland
