= Bettenhausen, Switzerland =

Bettenhausen
- Municipality
- Flag Coat of arms
- Location of Bettenhausen
- Location within Switzerland Location within Canton of Bern
- Coordinates: 47°10′N 7°43′E
- Country: Switzerland
- Canton: Bern
- District: Oberaargau

Government
  - Mayor: Andreas Rhyn-Willi

Area
  - Total: 3.95 km^{2} (1.53 sq mi)
- Elevation: 480 m (1,570 ft)

Population (Dec 2012)
  - Total: 684
  - Density: 173/km^{2} (448/sq mi)
- Time zone: UTC+01:00 (CET)
  - Summer (DST): UTC+02:00 (CEST)
- Postal code: 3366
- SFOS number: 973
- ISO 3166 code: CH-BE
- Surrounded by: Bollodingen, Herzogenbuchsee, Oberönz, Thörigen
- Website: www.bettenhausen.ch

Bettenhausen is a municipality in the Oberaargau administrative district in the canton of Bern in Switzerland. On 1 January 2011, the former municipality of Bollodingen was merged with Bettenhausen.

== History ==
Bettenhausen is first mentioned in 1335 as Bettenhusen.

A few scattered neolithic artifacts have been found in the municipality, from prehistoric settlements in the Aare valley. During the Middle Ages the village was part of the lands of the Freiherr of Aarburg. In 1429 he sold the village to the town of Burgdorf. In 1509 Burgdord bought the Ernizhaldenwald (Ernizhalden Forest) which was incorporated into the municipality and today is called the Bettenhausenwald.

Until 1833 Bettenhausen and Thörigen shared a school house. After that date they split into two independent school districts. In 1967 Bollodingen joined the Betternhausen school and in 2011 Bollodingen was absorbed into the political municipality. Secondary students travel to Herzogenbuchsee for school.

Today the vast majority of residents commute to jobs outside the municipality. About one third of the jobs inside its borders are in agriculture.

== Geography ==
Bettenhausen has an area of 3.94 km^{2} (1.52 sq mi). As of the 2005/06 survey, a total of 2.63 km^{2} (1.02 mi^{2}) or 66.8% is used for agricultural purposes, while 0.91 km^{2} (0.35 mi^{2}) or 23.1% is forested. Of rest of the municipality 0.39 km^{2} (0.15 mi^{2}) or 9.9% is settled (buildings or roads), 0.03 km^{2} (7.4 acres) or 0.8% is either rivers or lakes.

From the same survey, housing and buildings made up 6.1% and transportation infrastructure made up 3.3%. All of the forested land area is covered with heavy forests. Of the agricultural land, 50.8% is used for growing crops and 15.7% is pasturage. All the water in the municipality is flowing water.

The municipality consists of the village of Bettenhausen and scattered farms surrounding the village. It is part of the Herzogenbuchsee parish.

On 1 January 2011 the former municipality of Bollodingen merged into the municipality of Bettenhausen.

On 31 December 2009 Amtsbezirk Wangen, the municipality's former district, was dissolved. On the following day, 1 January 2010, it joined the newly created Verwaltungskreis Oberaargau.

== Coat of arms ==
The blazon of the municipal coat of arms is Azure a Ploughshare Argent in bend between a Mullet Or and a Moon Crescent of the same in bend.

== Demographics ==
Bettenhausen has a population (as of December 2020) of 642. As of 2012, 3.5% of the population are resident foreign nationals. Between the last 2 years (2010–2012) the population changed at a rate of 0.0%. Migration accounted for -1.9%, while births and deaths accounted for 0.0%.

Most of the population (as of 2000) speaks German (466 or 98.1%) as their first language, French is the second most common (4 or 0.8%) and Turkish is the third (2 or 0.4%).

As of 2013, the population was 48.7% male and 51.3% female. The population was made up of 318 Swiss men (46.8% of the population) and 13 (1.9%) non-Swiss men. There were 336 Swiss women (49.5%) and 12 (1.8%) non-Swiss women. Of the population in the municipality, 155 or about 32.6% were born in Bettenhausen and lived there in 2000. There were 203 or 42.7% who were born in the same canton, while 84 or 17.7% were born somewhere else in Switzerland, and 22 or 4.6% were born outside of Switzerland.

As of 2012, children and teenagers (0–19 years old) make up 17.0% of the population, while adults (20–64 years old) make up 63.6% and seniors (over 64 years old) make up 19.4%.

As of 2000, there were 190 people who were single and never married in the municipality. There were 248 married individuals, 23 widows or widowers and 14 individuals who are divorced.

As of 2010, there were 50 households that consist of only one person and 8 households with five or more people. In 2000, a total of 176 apartments (93.6% of the total) were permanently occupied, while 6 apartments (3.2%) were seasonally occupied and 6 apartments (3.2%) were empty. As of 2012, the construction rate of new housing units was 2.9 new units per 1000 residents. In 2012, single family homes made up 65.5% of the total housing in the municipality.

The historical population is given in the following chart:

== Economy ==
As of 2011, Bettenhausen had an unemployment rate of 1.8%. As of 2011, there were a total of 137 people employed in the municipality. Of these, there were 41 people employed in the primary economic sector and about 15 businesses involved in this sector. The secondary sector employs 46 people and there were 10 businesses in this sector. The tertiary sector employs 50 people, with 14 businesses in this sector. There were 247 residents of the municipality who were employed in some capacity, of which females made up 40.5% of the workforce.

In 2008 there were a total of 42 full-time equivalent jobs. The number of jobs in the primary sector was 18, all of which were in agriculture. The number of jobs in the secondary sector was 13 of which 7 or (53.8%) were in manufacturing and 6 (46.2%) were in construction. The number of jobs in the tertiary sector was 11. In the tertiary sector; 6 or 54.5% were in a hotel or restaurant, and 1 was a technical professional or scientist.

In 2000, there were 13 workers who commuted into the municipality and 197 workers who commuted away. The municipality is a net exporter of workers, with about 15.2 workers leaving the municipality for every one entering. A total of 50 workers (79.4% of the 63 total workers in the municipality) both lived and worked in Bettenhausen. Of the working population, 14.7% used public transportation to get to work, and 48.8% used a private car.

In 2013 the average church, local and cantonal tax rate on a married resident, with two children, of Bettenhausen making 150,000 CHF was 11.3%, while an unmarried resident's rate was 17.4%. For comparison, the median rate for all municipalities in the entire canton was 11.7% and 18.1%, while the nationwide median was 10.6% and 17.4% respectively.

In 2011 there were a total of 304 tax payers in the municipality. Of that total, 78 made over 75,000 CHF per year. There were 2 people who made between 15,000 and 20,000 per year. The greatest number of workers, 83, made between 50,000 and 75,000 CHF per year. The average income of the over 75,000 CHF group in Bettenhausen was 111,478 CHF, while the average across all of Switzerland was 136,785 CHF.

== Politics ==
In the 2011 federal election the most popular party was the Swiss People's Party (SVP) which received 38.6% of the vote. The next three most popular parties were the Social Democratic Party (SP) (20.3%), the Conservative Democratic Party (BDP) (19.5%) and the FDP.The Liberals (5.3%). In the federal election, a total of 290 votes were cast, and the voter turnout was 50.3%.

== Religion ==
From the 2000 census, 374 or 78.7% belonged to the Swiss Reformed Church, while 50 or 10.5% were Roman Catholic. Of the rest of the population, there were 8 individuals (or about 1.68% of the population) who belonged to another Christian church. There were 4 (or about 0.84% of the population) who were Muslim. There was 1 person who was Buddhist. 22 (or about 4.63% of the population) belonged to no church, are agnostic or atheist, and 16 individuals (or about 3.37% of the population) did not answer the question.

== Education ==
In Bettenhausen about 59.7% of the population have completed non-mandatory upper secondary education, and 18.4% have completed additional higher education (either university or a Fachhochschule). Of the 51 who had completed some form of tertiary schooling listed in the census, 76.5% were Swiss men, 17.6% were Swiss women.

The Canton of Bern school system provides one year of non-obligatory Kindergarten, followed by six years of Primary school. This is followed by three years of obligatory lower Secondary school where the students are separated according to ability and aptitude. Following the lower Secondary students may attend additional schooling or they may enter an apprenticeship.

During the 2012–13 school year, there were a total of 43 students attending classes in Bettenhausen. There were a total of 11 students in the German language kindergarten classes in the municipality. The municipality's primary school had 103 students in French language classes. Of the primary students, 21.4% were permanent or temporary residents of Switzerland (not citizens) and 13.6% have a different mother language than the classroom language. During the same year, the lower secondary schools in neighboring municipalities had a total of 32 students from Bettenhausen. The remainder of the students attend a private or special school.

As of 2000, there were a total of 83 students attending any school in the municipality. Of those, 42 both lived and attended school in the municipality, while 41 students came from another municipality. During the same year, 31 residents attended schools outside the municipality.
