= Herzogenbuchsee =

- Municipality
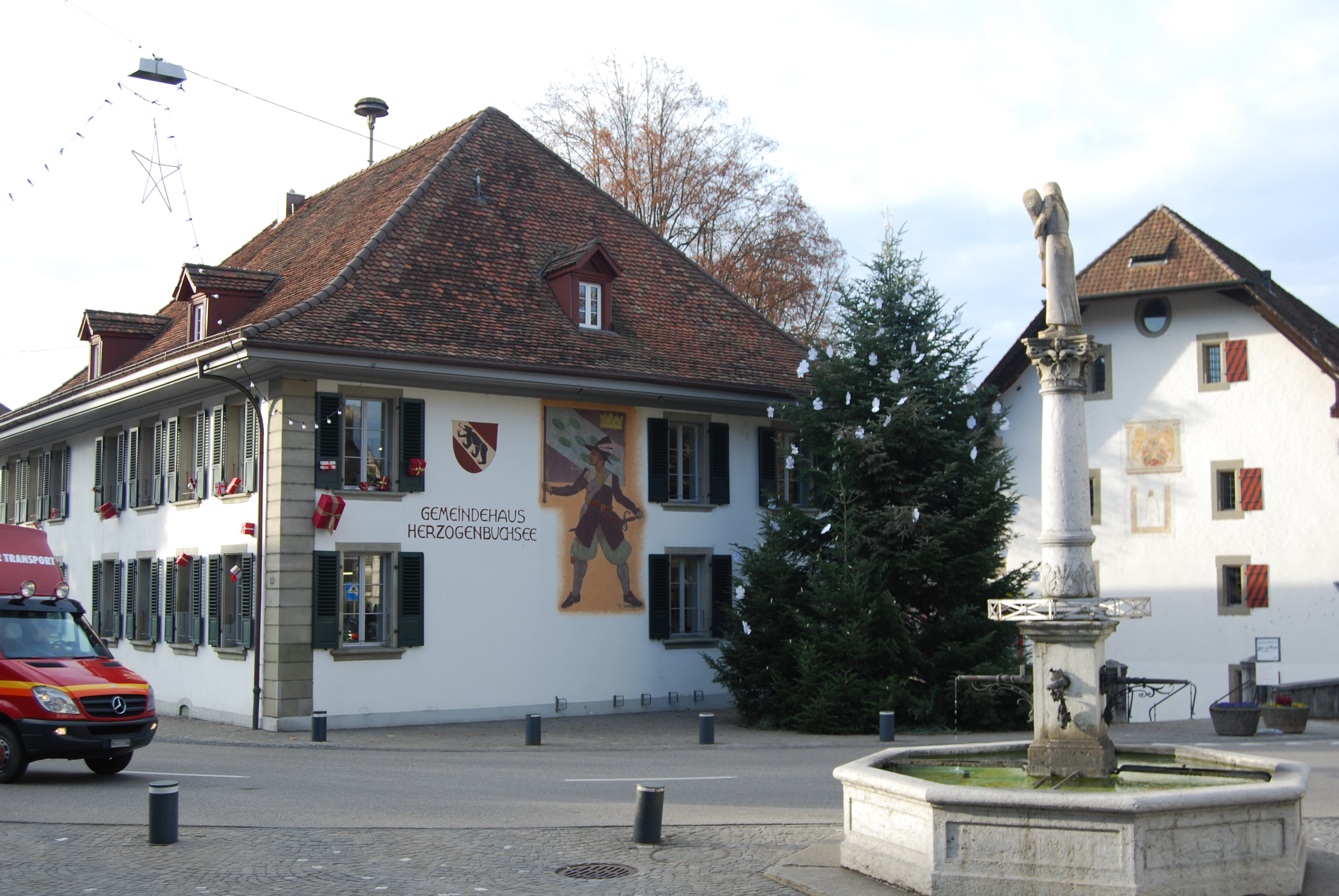
- Herzogenbuchsee town center

- Flag Coat of arms
- Location of Herzogenbuchsee
- Location within Switzerland Location within Canton of Bern
- Coordinates: 47°11′N 7°42′E
- Country: Switzerland
- Canton: Bern
- District: Oberaargau

Area
  - Total: 9.85 km^{2} (3.80 sq mi)
- Elevation: 458 m (1,503 ft)

Population (December 2020)
  - Total: 7,293
  - Density: 740/km^{2} (1,920/sq mi)
- Time zone: UTC+01:00 (CET)
  - Summer (DST): UTC+02:00 (CEST)
- Postal code: 3360
- SFOS number: 979
- ISO 3166 code: CH-BE
- Surrounded by: Bettenhausen, Graben, Heimenhausen, Niederönz, Oberönz, Thörigen, Thunstetten, Wanzwil
- Twin towns: Senica (Slovakia)
- Website: www.herzogenbuchsee.ch

Herzogenbuchsee is a municipality in the Oberaargau administrative district in the canton of Bern in Switzerland.

The population is 7055 (2011), counting the villages in the Oberaargau. The traditional name was Buchsi.

== History ==
Herzogenbuchsee is built on a moraine of the Rhone Glacier. The area has been settled for at least 10,000 years, with ancient settlements around the Inkwilersee and Burgäschisee. There is also evidence of Roman buildings from approximately 200 CE near the current Reformed Church.

The first documented use of the name puhsa (pronounced Buchsa, in Latin buxum, meaning "box") is found in the writings of Saint Gallus in 886 CE. In 1220 it was mentioned as Buchse and to distinguish it from Münchenbuchsee, in 1301 it was first mentioned as Herzogenbuchze.

It was ruled by Burgundy, the Zähringer, the Kyburger, and finally, brought under the Altberni sovereignty.

On January 1, 2008, the municipality of Oberönz became part of the municipality of Herzogenbuchsee.

== Geography ==
Aerial view by Walter Mittelholzer (1919)

Before the merger, Herzogenbuchsee had an area of 6.8 km^{2} (2.6 sq mi). Of this area, 35.1% is used for agricultural purposes, while 35% is forested. The rest of the land, (29.9%) is settled.

Following the merger of Oberönz into Herzogenbuchsee, the new municipality has an area, as of 2009, of 9.83 km^{2} (3.80 sq mi). Of this area, 3.7 km^{2} (1.4 sq mi) or 37.6% is used for agricultural purposes, while 3.38 km^{2} (1.31 sq mi) or 34.4% is forested. Of the rest of the land, 2.66 km^{2} (1.03 sq mi) or 27.1% is settled (buildings or roads), 0.02 km^{2} (4.9 acres) or 0.2% is either rivers or lakes and 0.06 km^{2} (15 acres) or 0.6% is unproductive land.

Of the built up area, industrial buildings made up 3.1% of the total area while housing and buildings made up 14.2% and transportation infrastructure made up 7.5%. while parks, green belts and sports fields made up 1.5%. 34.0% of the total land area is heavily forested. Of the agricultural land, 30.9% is used for growing crops and 6.1% is pastures. All the water in the municipality is in rivers and streams. The elevation of the train station is 465 m (1,526 ft).

== Coat of arms ==
The blazon of the municipal coat of arms is Gules on a Bend Argent six Box Leaves Vert and in chief a Crown Or.

== Demographics ==
Herzogenbuchsee has a population (as of 31 December 2020) of 7,293. As of 2007, 1,036 are foreign nationals. Over the last 10 years the population has grown at a rate of 6.1%. Most of the population (as of 2000) speaks German (88.9%), with Italian being second most common ( 3.5%) and Albanian being third ( 2.6%).

In the 2007 election the most popular party was the SVP which received 32.1% of the vote. The next three most popular parties were the SPS (23.2%), the FDP (20.8%) and the Green Party (9.5%).

The age distribution of the population (as of 2000) is children and teenagers (0–19 years old) make up 22% of the population, while adults (20–64 years old) make up 59.6% and seniors (over 64 years old) make up 18.4%. In Herzogenbuchsee about 71.2% of the population (between age 25–64) have completed either non-mandatory upper secondary education or additional higher education (either university or a Fachhochschule).

Herzogenbuchsee has an unemployment rate of 1.88%. As of 2005, there were 31 people employed in the primary economic sector and about 9 businesses involved in this sector. 1344 people are employed in the secondary sector and there are 78 businesses in this sector. 1931 people are employed in the tertiary sector, with 249 businesses in this sector. The historical population is given in the following table:

year	population
1764	481
1850	1,525
1900	2,533
1950	3,790
2000	5,338

== Transportation ==
The municipality has a railway station, Herzogenbuchsee, on the Olten–Bern line. It has regular service to Zürich Hauptbahnhof, Bern, and Olten.

== Notable people ==
- Daniel Rhagor (baptized 1577 at Herzogenbuchsee – 1648 in Bern), a Bernese official and horticultural writer
- Pierre du Bois de Dunilac (1943 at Herzogenbuchsee – 2007 in Pully), a Swiss writer, political scientist, philanthropist and humanist
- Simon Berger (born 1976), a Swiss contemporary visual artist.
