= Burgäschisee =

Lake in the cantons of Bern and Solothurn, Switzerland

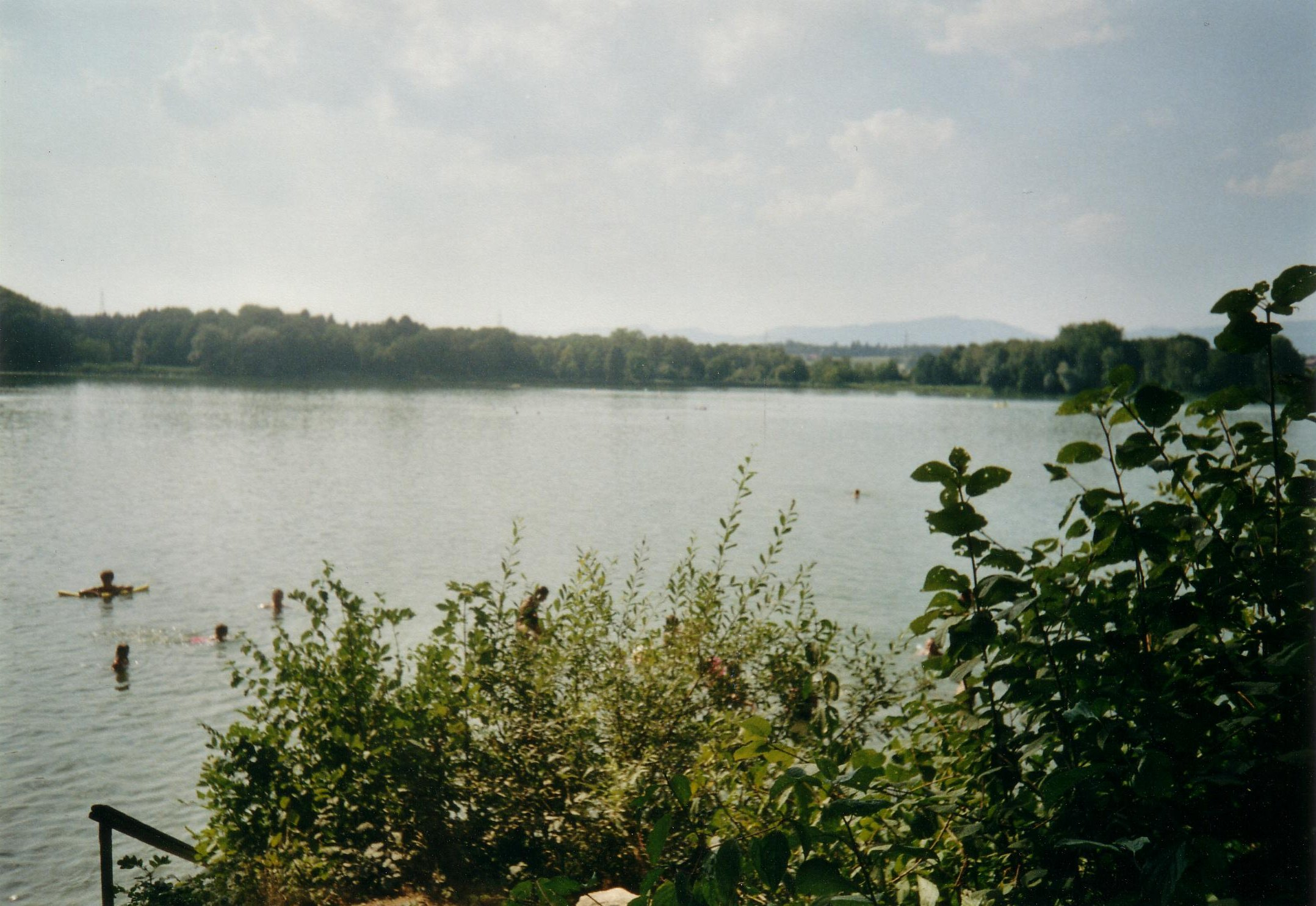

- Location within Canton of Solothurn Location within Canton of Bern Location within Switzerland Location within Alps
- Interactive map of Burgäschisee
- Location: Canton of Bern/Canton of Solothurn
- Coordinates: 47°10′10″N 7°40′6″E
- Basin countries: Switzerland
- Max. length: 0.6 km (0.37 mi)
- Max. width: 0.5 km (0.31 mi)
- Surface area: 21 ha (52 acres)
- Max. depth: 36 m (118 ft)
- Surface elevation: 465 m (1,526 ft)
- Settlements: Burgäschi (municipality of Aeschi SO)

Burgäschisee is a lake near Aeschi in Switzerland, on the border of the cantons of Bern and Solothurn. The lake has a surface of 21 ha and a maximum depth of 36 m.

In 1941 and 1943, the water level was lowered by 2 m. The current surface elevation is 465 m.
