= Bollodingen =

- Former municipality
- Flag Coat of arms
- Location of Bollodingen
- Location within Switzerland Location within Canton of Bern
- Coordinates: 47°10′N 7°43′E
- Country: Switzerland
- Canton: Bern
- District: Oberaargau

Area
  - Total: 2.0 km^{2} (0.77 sq mi)
- Elevation: 476 m (1,562 ft)

Population (31 December 2010)
  - Total: 205
  - Density: 100/km^{2} (270/sq mi)
- Time zone: UTC+01:00 (CET)
  - Summer (DST): UTC+02:00 (CEST)
- Postal code: 3366
- SFOS number: 974
- ISO 3166 code: CH-BE
- Surrounded by: Bettenhausen, Hermiswil, Oberönz, Ochlenberg, Steinhof (SO), Thörigen
- Website: www.bollodingen.ch

Bollodingen is a former municipality in the Oberaargau administrative district in the canton of Bern in Switzerland. On 1 January 2011 it was merged with the municipality of Bettenhausen.

== History ==
Bollodingen is first mentioned in 1266 as Bolathingen.

== Geography ==
Bollodingen has an area, as of 2009, of 1.96 km^{2} (0.76 sq mi). Of this area, 1.18 km^{2} (0.46 sq mi) or 60.2% is used for agricultural purposes, while 0.59 km^{2} (0.23 sq mi) or 30.1% is forested. Of the rest of the land, 0.18 km^{2} (0.069 sq mi) or 9.2% is settled (buildings or roads), 0.02 km^{2} (4.9 acres) or 1.0% is either rivers or lakes.

Of the built up area, housing and buildings made up 5.1% and transportation infrastructure made up 4.1%. 30.1% of the total land area is heavily forested. Of the agricultural land, 41.3% is used for growing crops and 18.4% is pastures. All the water in the municipality is in rivers and streams.

The municipality is located in the Önz valley.

== Demographics ==
Bollodingen has a population (as of 31 December 2010) of 205. As of 2007, 3.0% of the population was made up of foreign nationals. Over the last 10 years the population has grown at a rate of 3.6%. Most of the population (as of 2000) speaks German (98.6%), with French being second most common ( 0.9%) and English being third ( 0.5%).

In the 2007 election the most popular party was the SVP which received 52.4% of the vote. The next three most popular parties were the SPS (18.3%), the FDP (9.2%) and the local small left-wing parties (8.2%).

The age distribution of the population (as of 2000) is children and teenagers (0–19 years old) make up 26.4% of the population, while adults (20–64 years old) make up 59.9% and seniors (over 64 years old) make up 13.7%. The entire Swiss population is generally well educated. In Bollodingen about 84.6% of the population (between age 25-64) have completed either non-mandatory upper secondary education or additional higher education (either University or a Fachhochschule).

Bollodingen has an unemployment rate of 0.93%. As of 2005, there were 18 people employed in the primary economic sector and about 8 businesses involved in this sector. 36 people are employed in the secondary sector and there are 3 businesses in this sector. 5 people are employed in the tertiary sector, with 2 businesses in this sector. The historical population is given in the following table:

| year | population |
|---|---|
| 1764 | 172 |
| 1850 | 274 |
| 1900 | 239 |
| 1950 | 236 |
| 2000 | 212 |
