= Wangen District =

Coordinates: 47.2333°N 7.65°E

Wangen District Amtsbezirk Wangen
- District
- Flag Coat of arms

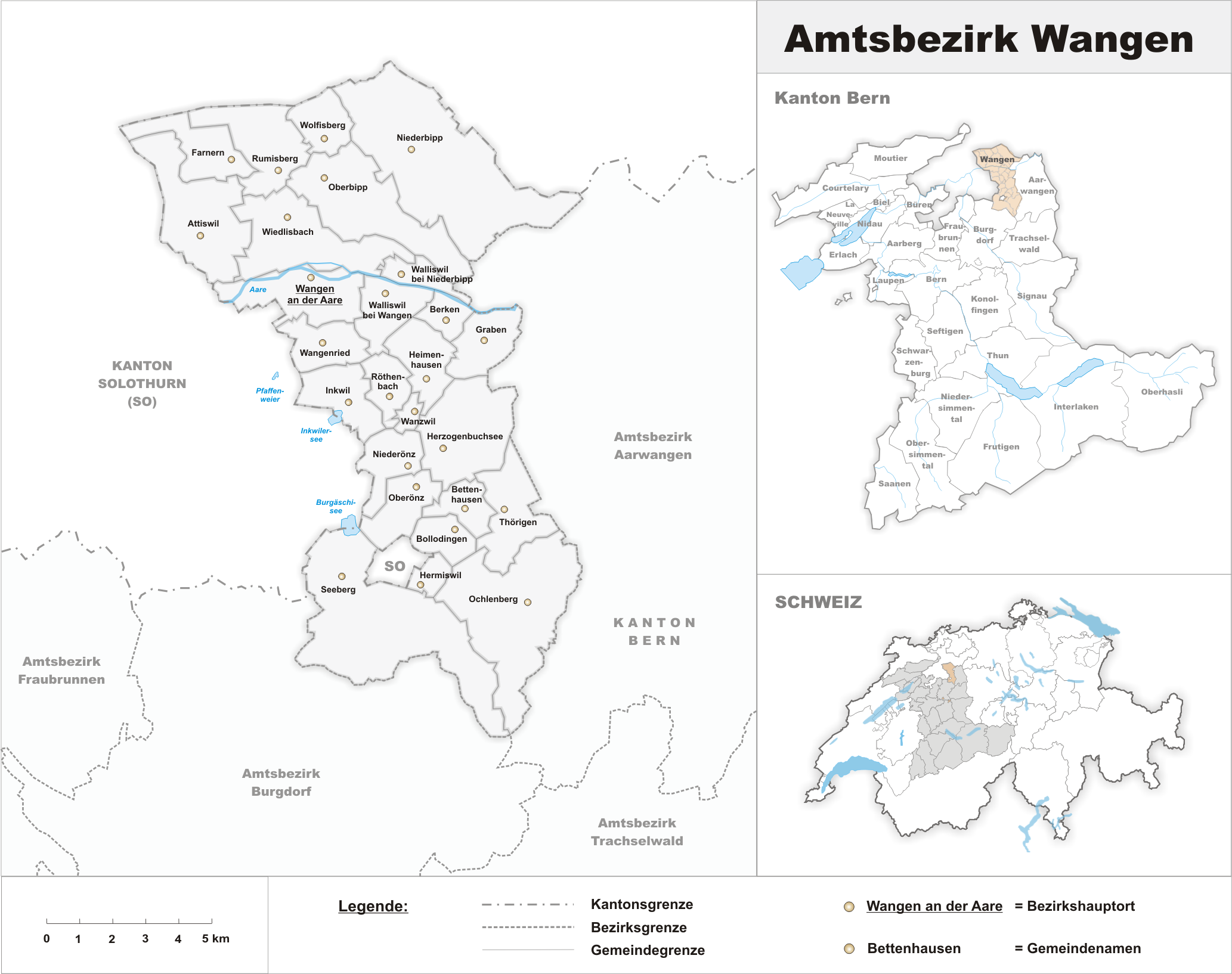
- Country: Switzerland
- Canton: Bern
- Capital: Wangen

Area
  - Total: 151 km^{2} (58 sq mi)

Population (2007)
  - Total: 26,736
  - Density: 177/km^{2} (459/sq mi)
- Time zone: UTC+1 (CET)
  - Summer (DST): UTC+2 (CEST)
- Municipalities: 23

Wangen District is one of the 26 administrative districts in the canton of Bern, Switzerland. Its capital is the municipality of Wangen an der Aare.

From 1 January 2010, the district lost its administrative power while being replaced by the Oberaargau administrative district, whose administrative centre is Wangen an der Aare. Since 2010, it remains therefore a fully recognised district under the law and the Constitution (Art.3 al.2) of the Canton of Berne.

The district has an area of 129 km² and consists of 23 municipalities.

Municipality	Population (Dec 2007)	Area (km²)
Attiswil	1,325	7.7
Berken	50	1.4
Bettenhausen	496	2.0
Bollodingen	233	2.0
Farnern	208	3.7
Graben	299	3.2
Heimenhausen^{a}	421	3.2
Hermiswil	94	23.4
Herzogenbuchsee^{b}	6,719	9.8
Inkwil	658	3.4
Niederbipp	3,850	17.5
Niederönz	1,470	2.8
Oberbipp	1,544	8.5
Ochlenberg	607	12.1
Rumisberg	493	5.2
Seeberg	1,363	15.8
Thörigen	1,027	4.5
Walliswil bei Niederbipp	224	1.4
Walliswil bei Wangen	578	3.1
Wangen an der Aare	2,015	5.2
Wangenried	398	2.9
Wiedlisbach	2,141	7.5
Wolfisberg	182	2.4

- ^aIn 2009, the municipalities of Wanzwil and Röthenbach bei Herzogenbuchsee became part of the municipality of Heimenhausen
- ^bIn 2008 Oberönz became part of Herzogenbuchsee
