= Wengen (disambiguation) =

Wengen is a village and winter resort in Switzerland.

Wengen may also refer to:

== Places ==
- Wengen railway station, Switzerland
- La Val (German: Wengen), a commune in South Tyrol, Italy
- a village in the municipality of Weitnau im Allgäu, Germany
- a village in the municipality of Dießen am Ammersee in Bavaria, Germany

== People ==
- Gu Wengen (born 1946), Chinese retired vice-admiral
- Liang Wengen (born 1956), Chinese billionaire entrepreneur

== See also ==
- Wangen (disambiguation)
- Wingen (disambiguation)
