= Walliswil =

Walliswil may refer to:

- Walliswil bei Niederbipp
- Walliswil bei Wangen - Swiss communities, separated by a river
