= Wangen =

Wangen may refer to:

== Places ==
=== Germany ===
- Wangen im Allgäu, Ravensburg district, Baden-Württemberg
- Wangen (Göppingen), Göppingen district, Baden-Württemberg
- Wangen, Saxony-Anhalt, a municipality in the Burgenland district, Saxony-Anhalt
- Wangen, Stuttgart, a borough of the city of Stuttgart

=== Switzerland ===
- Wangen an der Aare, Canton of Bern (Wangen BE)
  - Wangen District, named after Wangen an der Aare
- Wangen bei Olten, Canton of Solothurn (Wangen SO)
- Wangen, Schwyz, Canton of Schwyz (Wangen SZ)
- Wangen-Brüttisellen, Canton of Zürich (Wangen ZH)

=== Other ===
- Wangen, Bas-Rhin, Bas-Rhin department, France
- Wangen, Indonesia, a village in Polanharjo, Klaten, Central Java, Indonesia

== People ==
- Frederick von Wangen (? - 1218), a Prince-Bishop of Trento

== See also ==
- FC Wangen bei Olten, a Swiss football club based in Wangen bei Olten
- Walliswil bei Wangen
