= Graben, Switzerland =

Graben
- Municipality
- Flag Coat of arms
- Location of Graben
- Location within Switzerland Location within Canton of Bern
- Coordinates: 47°13′N 7°43′E
- Country: Switzerland
- Canton: Bern
- District: Oberaargau

Area
  - Total: 3.2 km^{2} (1.2 sq mi)
- Elevation: 455 m (1,493 ft)

Population (December 2020)
  - Total: 336
  - Density: 110/km^{2} (270/sq mi)
- Time zone: UTC+01:00 (CET)
  - Summer (DST): UTC+02:00 (CEST)
- Postal code: 3376
- SFOS number: 976
- ISO 3166 code: CH-BE
- Surrounded by: Aarwangen, Bannwil, Berken, Heimenhausen, Herzogenbuchsee, Thunstetten
- Website: https://www.graben.ch SFSO statistics

Graben (Swiss Standard German pronunciation: [ˈɡraːbn̩]) is a municipality in the Oberaargau administrative district in the canton of Bern in Switzerland.

== History ==
Graben is first mentioned in 1220 as Stadonce. In the 19th Century it was known as Graben durch den Wald.

== Geography ==
Aerial view with Berken and Bannwil from 3000 m by Walter Mittelholzer (1923)

Graben has an area, as of 2009, of 3.16 km^{2} (1.22 sq mi). Of this area, 1.67 km^{2} (0.64 sq mi) or 52.8% is used for agricultural purposes, while 1.16 km^{2} (0.45 sq mi) or 36.7% is forested. Of the rest of the land, 0.22 km^{2} (0.085 sq mi) or 7.0% is settled (buildings or roads), 0.11 km^{2} (27 acres) or 3.5% is either rivers or lakes and 0.01 km^{2} (2.5 acres) or 0.3% is unproductive land.

Of the built up area, housing and buildings made up 4.7% and transportation infrastructure made up 1.9%. 33.9% of the total land area is heavily forested and 2.8% is covered with orchards or small clusters of trees. Of the agricultural land, 36.4% is used for growing crops and 16.1% is pastures. All the water in the municipality is in rivers and streams.

The municipality is located at the confluence of the Önz into the Aare river a nature reserve. It includes the hamlets of Baumgarten, Burach, Gsoll, Hubel, Kleinholz, Schörlishäusern, Schwendi and Stadönz.

== Demographics ==
Graben has a population (as of 31 December 2020) of 336. As of 2007, 4.7% of the population was made up of foreign nationals. Over the last 10 years the population has grown at a rate of 0.3%. Most of the population (as of 2000) speaks German (98.7%), with French being second most common ( 1.0%) and English being third ( 0.3%).

In the 2007 election the most popular party was the SVP which received 62% of the vote. The next three most popular parties were the SPS (9.7%), the local small left-wing parties (8.3%) and the FDP (8%).

The age distribution of the population (as of 2000) is children and teenagers (0–19 years old) make up 27.2% of the population, while adults (20–64 years old) make up 56% and seniors (over 64 years old) make up 16.8%. About 75.9% of the population (between age 25-64) have completed either non-mandatory upper secondary education or additional higher education (either university or a Fachhochschule).

Graben has an unemployment rate of 1.97%. As of 2005, there were 39 people employed in the primary economic sector and about 12 businesses involved in this sector. 6 people are employed in the secondary sector and there are 2 businesses in this sector. 45 people are employed in the tertiary sector, with 6 businesses in this sector. The historical population is given in the following table:

year	population
1764	221
1850	325
1900	303
1950	342
2000	309
