= Oberaargau =

Coordinates: 47°11′N 7°45′E

The Oberaargau is the region that encompasses the upper watershed of the Aar River in the canton of Bern in Switzerland. On the north, lie the Jura Mountains, and on the south the hills leading to the Emmental.

Administratively, the Oberaargau forms a district within the region Emmental-Oberaargau of the canton of Bern. Historically (until 2009), the Oberaargau comprised the two administrative districts of Wangen and Aarwangen.

== Geography ==
It lies in the extreme northeast corner of the canton and includes the districts of Aarwangen and Wangen, and part of the district of Trachselwald. It is surrounded by the cantons of Solothurn, Aargau, and Lucerne. It is connected to the rest of the canton of Bern only in the south, where it borders on the Emmenthal.

The Oberaargau lies on the Swiss Plateau between the large population centers of Bern and Zürich and has therefore become a major thoroughfare for traffic running both east and west and north and south. The Aar River traverses it from west to east, and the primary motorway of Switzerland (the A1) and the main Bern-Zürich railway run through it, making it a central transport region.

The primary city is Langenthal, and the towns of Herzogenbuchsee, Wangen, and Aarwangen are important transportation centers. Since the building of the motorway, the primary economic development has taken place in the north, at the foot of the Jura Mountains, particularly in the towns of Wiedlisbach and Niederbipp.

The highest point in the Oberaargaus is the Höllchöpfli in the municipality of Rumisberg, at 1231 meters, and the lowest point is on the Aare at Wynau, at 405 meters.

== Administrative district ==
Oberaargau District Verwaltungskreis Oberaargau
- District
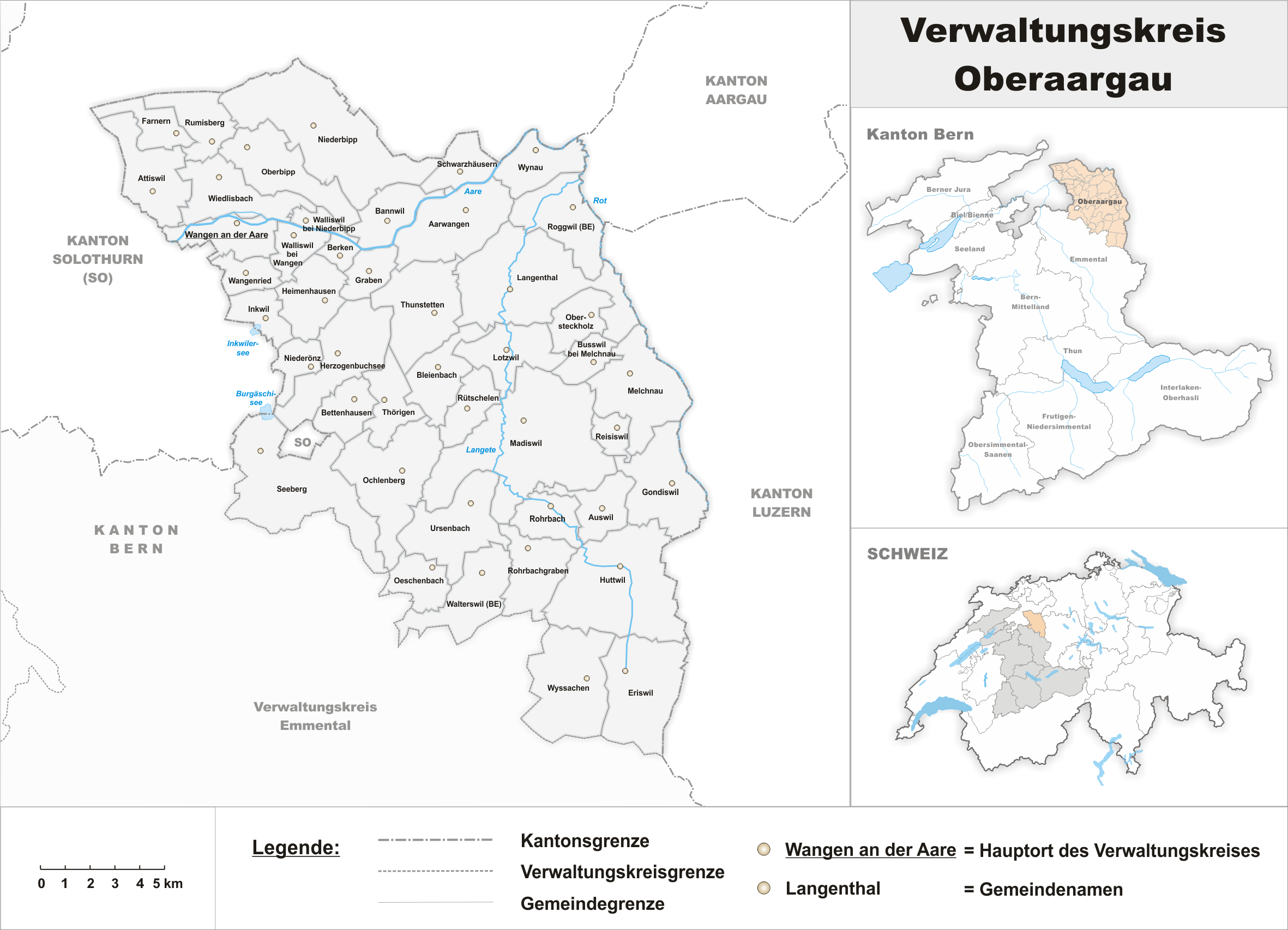
- Country: Switzerland
- Canton: Bern
- Capital: Wangen an der Aare

Area
  - Total: 331.04 km^{2} (127.82 sq mi)

Population (2020)
  - Total: 82,472
  - Density: 249.13/km^{2} (645.24/sq mi)
- Time zone: UTC+1 (CET)
  - Summer (DST): UTC+2 (CEST)
- Municipalities: 43

The Oberaargau District in the Canton of Bern was created on January 1, 2010. It is part of the Emmental-Oberaargau administrative region and includes 45 municipalities over an area (based on the 2004/09/16 survey) of 331.04 km^{2} (127.82 sq mi). (Note: Based on the 2004/09/16 survey) As of 31 December 2020, its population is 82,472.

Border	Name	Population (31 December 2020)	Area in km^{2}
Aarwangen	Aarwangen	4,638	9.9
Attiswil	Attiswil	1,532	7.65
Auswil	Auswil	448	4.62
Bannwil	Bannwil	676	4.78
Berken	Berken	44	1.39
Bettenhausen	Bettenhausen	642	3.94
Bleienbach	Bleienbach	734	5.69
Busswil bei Melchnau	Busswil bei Melchnau	177	2.86
Eriswil	Eriswil	1,358	11.34
Farnern	Farnern	227	3.68
Gondiswil	Gondiswil	711	9.4
Graben	Graben	336	3.16
Heimenhausen	Heimenhausen	1,136	5.84
Herzogenbuchsee	Herzogenbuchsee	7,293	9.82
Huttwil	Huttwil	5,009	17.24
Inkwil	Inkwil	628	3.38
Langenthal	Langenthal	15,544	21.13
Lotzwil	Lotzwil	2,663	6.22
Madiswil	Madiswil	3,284	23.17
Melchnau	Melchnau	1,488	10.27
Niederbipp	Niederbipp	5,097	19.77
Niederönz	Niederönz	1,691	2.79
Oberbipp	Oberbipp	1,753	8.45
Ochlenberg	Ochlenberg	563	9.9
Oeschenbach	Oeschenbach	220	3.92
Reisiswil	Reisiswil	173	2.01
Roggwil	Roggwil	4,176	7.84
Rohrbach	Rohrbach	1,520	4.08
Rohrbachgraben	Rohrbachgraben	390	6.46
Rumisberg	Rumisberg	491	5.14
Rütschelen	Rütschelen	564	3.98
Schwarzhäusern	Schwarzhäusern	533	3.79
Seeberg	Seeberg	1,559	16.8
Thörigen	Thörigen	1,156	4.55
Thunstetten	Thunstetten	3,458	9.66
Ursenbach	Ursenbach	881	9.9
Walliswil bei Niederbipp	Walliswil bei Niederbipp	227	9.9
Walliswil bei Wangen	Walliswil bei Wangen	604	9.9
Walterswil	Walterswil	540	7.87
Wangen an der Aare	Wangen an der Aare	2,377	5.22
Wiedlisbach	Wiedlisbach	2,382	7.5
Wynau	Wynau	1,624	5.07
Wyssachen	Wyssachen	1,103	11.69
	Total	82,472	331.04

== Mergers ==
- On 1 January 2021 the former municipality of Obersteckholz merged into Langenthal.
- On 1 January 2024 the former municipality of Wangenried merged into Wangen an der Aare.

== History ==
The region was already known as the Oberaargau in the early Middle Ages (in Latin superior pagus Aragauginsis). However, this concept also included the Emmenthal.

In the High Middle Ages, the area was divided among the counts of Froburg, Aarwangen (later Grünenberg), Zähringen (later the Habsburgs).

As the political influence of the city of Bern increased in the late Middle Ages, the Oberaargau came more and more into its sphere of influence. In the 15th century, Bern conquered both the Oberaargau and the Unteraargau and ruled them as one.

When Bern lost its old power in 1798, the Unteraargau became the modern canton of Aargau. The boundary between the Oberaargau and Unteraargau was fixed in 1798 along the Wigger River. In 1802, however, it was shifted west to Murg river. This action was confirmed by the Act of Mediation of Napoleon in 1803 and the Congress of Vienna in 1815.
