= Berken =

- Municipality
- Flag Coat of arms
- Location of Berken
- Location within Switzerland Location within Canton of Bern
- Coordinates: 47°14′N 7°43′E
- Country: Switzerland
- Canton: Bern
- District: Oberaargau

Government
  - Mayor: Hans Geissbühler

Area
  - Total: 1.4 km^{2} (0.54 sq mi)
- Elevation: 420 m (1,380 ft)

Population (Dec 2012)
  - Total: 42
  - Density: 30/km^{2} (78/sq mi)
- Time zone: UTC+01:00 (CET)
  - Summer (DST): UTC+02:00 (CEST)
- Postal code: 3376
- SFOS number: 972
- ISO 3166 code: CH-BE
- Surrounded by: Bannwil, Graben, Heimenhausen, Walliswil bei Niederbipp, Walliswil bei Wangen
- Website: www.berken.ch

Berken is a municipality in the Oberaargau administrative district in the canton of Bern in Switzerland.

== History ==
Berken is first mentioned in 1272 as Berinkon.

A few scattered mesolithic and neolithic artifacts have been found in the municipality, from prehistoric settlements in the Aare valley. During the Middle Ages it was a small farming settlement in the Herrschaft and later bailiwick of Aarwangen. Following the 1798 French invasion and the creation of the Helvetic Republic Berken left the Aarwangen bailiwick. After the collapse of the Republic and 1803 Act of Mediation it joined the newly created Wangen District.

It is part of the Graben school district.

Today agriculture provides over one third of jobs in the municipality, with the remaining jobs in gravel mining, concrete work and the local restaurant.

== Geography ==
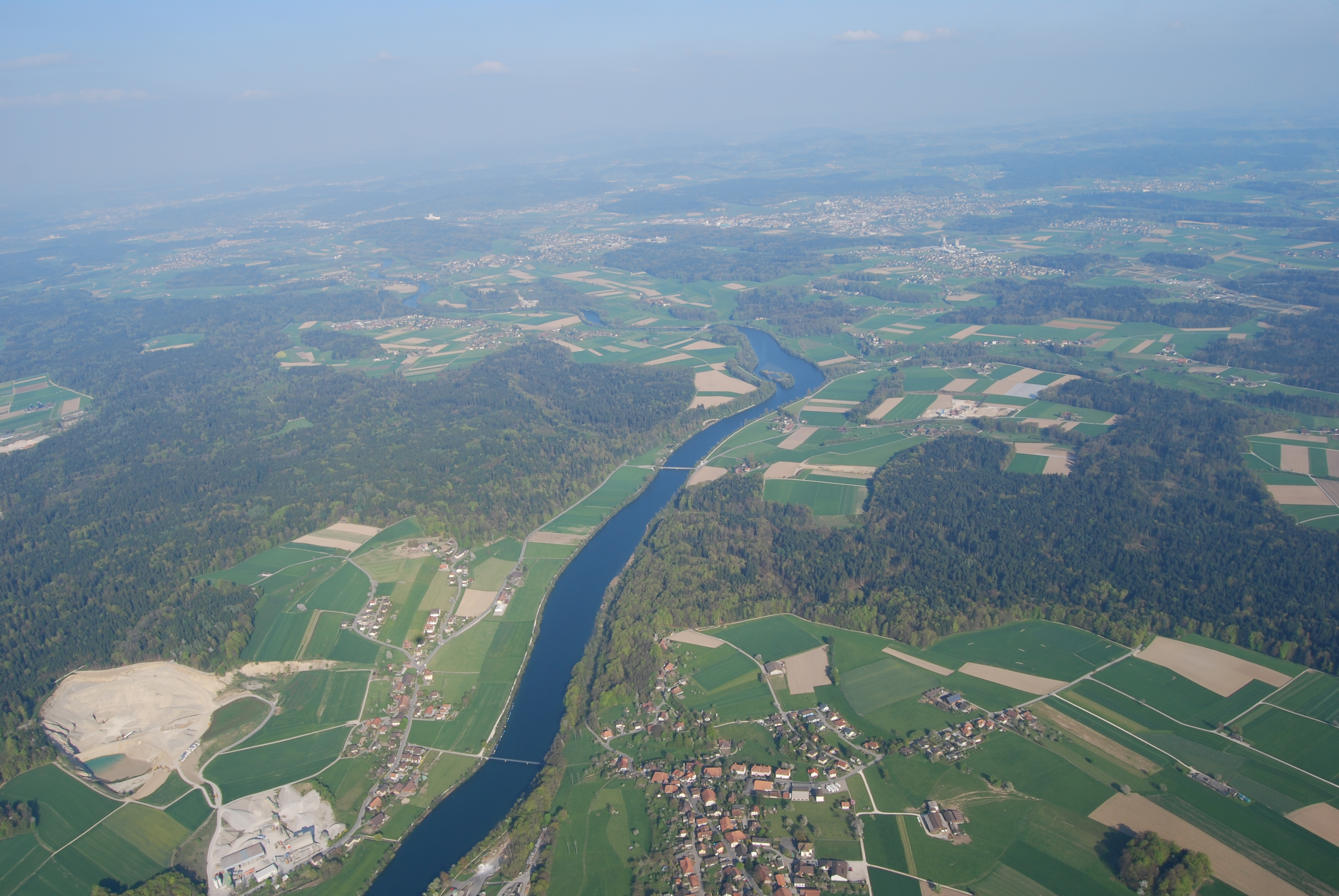
View of the Aare river with several municipalities. Berken is visible on the right side of the river in the middle of the picture.

Berken has an area of 1.39 km^{2} (0.54 sq mi). As of the 2005/06 survey, a total of 0.74 km^{2} (0.29 mi^{2}) or 53.2% is used for agricultural purposes, while 0.42 km^{2} (0.16 mi^{2}) or 30.2% is forested. Of rest of the municipality 0.16 km^{2} (0.062 mi^{2}) or 11.5% is settled (buildings or roads), 0.06 km^{2} (15 acres) or 4.3% is either rivers or lakes and 0.02 km^{2} (4.9 acres) or 1.4% is unproductive land.

Aerial view by Walter Mittelholzer (1923)

From the same survey, housing and buildings made up 3.6% and transportation infrastructure made up 3.6%. Power and water infrastructure as well as other special developed areas made up 3.6% of the area A total of 28.8% of the total land area is heavily forested and 1.4% is covered with orchards or small clusters of trees. Of the agricultural land, 41.7% is used for growing crops and 10.8% is pasturage. All the water in the municipality is flowing water.

The small municipality is located on the left bank of the Aare river. It includes the hamlets of Ober- and Niederberken and Christenhof. It belongs to the parish of Herzogenbuchsee.

On 31 December 2009 Amtsbezirk Wangen, the municipality's former district, was dissolved. On the following day, 1 January 2010, it joined the newly created Verwaltungskreis Oberaargau.

== Coat of arms ==
The blazon of the municipal coat of arms is Vert two Ploughshares Argent in saltire.

== Demographics ==
Berken has a population (as of December 2020) of 44, all Swiss citizens. Between the last 2 years (2010-2012) the population changed at a rate of -14.3%. Migration accounted for -4.1%, while births and deaths accounted for -8.2%.

All of the population (51) (as of 2000) speaks German.

As of 2013, the population was 46.5% male and 53.5% female, all Swiss citizens. Of the population in the municipality, 30 or about 58.8% were born in Berken and lived there in 2000. There were 11 or 21.6% who were born in the same canton, while 10 or 19.6% were born somewhere else in Switzerland.

As of 2012, children and teenagers (0–19 years old) make up 11.9% of the population, while adults (20–64 years old) make up 59.5% and seniors (over 64 years old) make up 28.6%.

As of 2000, there were 21 people who were single and never married in the municipality. There were 22 married individuals, 7 widows or widowers and 1 individuals who are divorced.

As of 2010, there were 9 households that consist of only one person and 3 households with five or more people. In 2000, a total of 21 apartments (100.0% of the total) were permanently occupied. The vacancy rate for the municipality, in 2013, was 4.8%. In 2012, single family homes made up 57.9% of the total housing in the municipality.

The historical population is given in the following chart:

== Economy ==
As of 2011, Berken had an unemployment rate of 0%. As of 2011, there were a total of 44 people employed in the municipality. Of these, there were 22 people employed in the primary economic sector and about 7 businesses involved in this sector. The secondary sector employs 4 people and there was 1 business in this sector. The tertiary sector employs 18 people, with 1 business in this sector. There were 26 residents of the municipality who were employed in some capacity, of which females made up 42.3% of the workforce.

In 2008 there were a total of 38 full-time equivalent jobs. The number of jobs in the primary sector was 14, all of which were in agriculture. The number of jobs in the secondary sector was 9 of which 2 or (22.2%) were in manufacturing, 7 or (77.8%) were in mining. The number of jobs in the tertiary sector was 15 all in a hotel or restaurant.

In 2000, there were 17 workers who commuted into the municipality and 12 workers who commuted away. The municipality is a net importer of workers, with about 1.4 workers entering the municipality for every one leaving. A total of 14 workers (45.2% of the 31 total workers in the municipality) both lived and worked in Berken.

Of the working population, 7.7% used public transportation to get to work, and 34.6% used a private car. In 2013 the average church, local and cantonal tax rate on a married resident, with two children, of Berken making 150,000 CHF was 10.6%, while an unmarried resident's rate was 16.2%. For comparison, the median rate for all municipalities in the entire canton was 11.7% and 18.1%, while the nationwide median was 10.6% and 17.4% respectively.

In 2011 there were a total of 24 tax payers in the municipality. Of that total, 5 made over 75,000 CHF per year. The greatest number of workers, 6, made between 40,000 and 50,000 CHF per year. The average income of the over 75,000 CHF group in Berken was 121,760 CHF, while the average across all of Switzerland was 136,785 CHF.

In 2011 a total of 1.1% of the population received direct financial assistance from the government.

== Politics ==
In the 2011 federal election the most popular party was the Swiss People's Party (SVP) which received 67.5% of the vote. The next three most popular parties were the Conservative Democratic Party (BDP) (18.5%), a local party (6.3%) and the Christian Social Party (CSP) (4.4%). In the federal election, a total of 27 votes were cast, and the voter turnout was 64.3%.

== Religion ==
From the 2000 census, 48 or 94.1% belonged to the Swiss Reformed Church, while 2 or 3.9% were Roman Catholic.

== Education ==
In Berken about 50% of the population have completed non-mandatory upper secondary education, and 15.4% have completed additional higher education (either university or a Fachhochschule). Of the 4 who had completed some form of tertiary schooling listed in the census, 50.0% were Swiss men, 50.0% were Swiss women.
