= Wanzwil =

- Former municipality
- Flag Coat of arms
- Location of Wanzwil
- Location within Switzerland Location within Canton of Bern
- Coordinates: 47°12′N 7°42′E
- Country: Switzerland
- Canton: Bern
- District: Wangen

Area
  - Total: 0.6 km^{2} (0.23 sq mi)
- Elevation: 455 m (1,493 ft)

Population (December 2007)
  - Total: 208
  - Density: 350/km^{2} (900/sq mi)
- Time zone: UTC+01:00 (CET)
  - Summer (DST): UTC+02:00 (CEST)
- Postal code: 3372
- SFOS number: 994
- ISO 3166 code: CH-BE
- Surrounded by: Heimenhausen, Herzogenbuchsee, Niederönz, Röthenbach bei Herzogenbuchsee
- Website: www.wanzwil.ch

Wanzwil is a municipality in the district of Wangen in the canton of Bern in Switzerland.

On January 1, 2009, the municipalities of Wanzwil and Röthenbach bei Herzogenbuchsee became part of the municipality of Heimenhausen.

== Geography ==
Before the merger, Wanzwil has an area of 0.6 km^{2} (0.23 sq mi). Of this area, 58.7% is used for agricultural purposes, while 27% is forested. The rest of the land, (14.3%) is settled.

== Demographics ==
Before the merger, Wanzwil had a population (as of 2007) of 208, of which 6.3% are foreign nationals. Over the last 10 years the population has decreased at a rate of -13.3%. Most of the population (as of 2000) speaks German (86.3%), with Italian being second most common ( 5.8%) and Albanian being third ( 2.9%).

In the 2007 election the most popular party was the SVP which received 45.7% of the vote. The next three most popular parties were the FDP (15.3%), the SPS (14%) and the Green Party (10.3%).

The age distribution of the population (as of 2000) is children and teenagers (0–19 years old) make up 21.2% of the population, while adults (20–64 years old) make up 65.6% and seniors (over 64 years old) make up 13.3%. In Wanzwil about 70.7% of the population (between age 25-64) have completed either non-mandatory upper secondary education or additional higher education (either University or a Fachhochschule).

Wanzwil has an unemployment rate of 0.64%. As of 2005, there were 10 people employed in the primary economic sector and about 3 businesses involved in this sector. 12 people are employed in the secondary sector and there are 3 businesses in this sector. 8 people are employed in the tertiary sector, with 4 businesses in this sector.
