= Arnold Rikli =

Swiss physician (1823–1906)

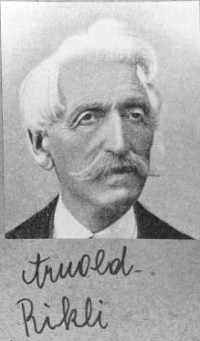
- Born: 13 February 1823; Wangen an der Aare, Switzerland
- Died: 30 April 1906 (aged 83); Sankt Thomas, Austro-Hungarian Monarchy (now Austria)
- Occupation: physician
- Known for: naturism

Arnold Rikli (13 February 1823 – 30 April 1906) was a Swiss naturopath renowned for his natural healing regimens and his pivotal role in establishing Bled, Slovenia as a prominent health tourism destination in the late 19th century. He was also an advocate of the Lebensreform ("life reform") social movement.

== History ==
Rikli was born into a wealthy Swiss family as the fourth of ten children. His father, a dye works factory owner and politically active figure, intended his sons to inherit both his business acumen and sense of civic responsibility. Rikli married early, at the age of 21, a year before relocating to Seebach near Spittal, Austria, where he and his brothers Karl and Rudolf established a leather dyeing factory. During this period, Rikli experienced a serious health crisis, which he attributed to chemical exposure in the workplace. Seeking rest and recuperation, he travelled to Bled, then part of the Austrian Empire's Slovenian territory, first time in 1852—an experience that proved physically restorative and marked a turning point in his life.

In search of recovery, Rikli traveled to Bled in 1852, where the fresh air, clean water, and favourable climate aided his healing. Captivated by the natural surroundings, he relocated permanently in 1854 and, the following year, established the Natural Healing Institute for Atmospheric Treatment (Naturheilanstalt für atmosphärische Cur). Leaving behind the family business, he began actively promoting his nature-based method of healing in Bled. His unorthodox practices frequently drew criticism from medical professionals, and disputes often culminated in litigation. Nevertheless, Rikli remained unwavering in his convictions until his death, convinced he had made a meaningful contribution to the advancement of medicine.

Rikli's therapeutic philosophy emphasised the holistic power of natural elements—sunlight, fresh air, clean water, physical movement, and simple nutrition. The cures were expensive and attracted a wealthy middle class who would otherwise hardly have found their way to Bled. Guests stayed in wooden, well-ventilated huts and wore minimal, breathable garments such as linen shirts, ventilated knee-length garments, or waistcloths. The so-called Riklianer subjected themselves, summer after summer, to a rigorous regimen at his health retreat. Their treatments included physical exercise conducted in the fresh air, followed by extensive exposure to sun, then cold-water dousing and brief showers to cool off. Meals were served only after the workout, and the menu usually consisted of light, preferably vegetarian food.

Although spa guests were never entirely exposed when in public view at the health resort and its surrounding "air park" (Luftpark), their wearing of abbreviated attire led locals to describe them as "naked". Shielded from prying eyes by a high wall, they underwent intense naked light baths on the spa's rooftop, basking privately in the sun's exposure.

Riki's well-known saying was: "Water is good, air is better, but light is best." He designed numerous walking paths of varying difficulty around Bled, including one that led to Straža Hill—an area that, until recently, operated as a winter ski slope and, in summer, hosted a walking trail, fitness path, and a toboggan run built along the slope itself.

For many years, it was assumed that Rikli did not speak Slovene. However, researcher Vojko Zavodnik disproved this in his study In the Footsteps of Arnold Rikli, which uncovered handwritten instructions Rikli had issued to his employees in Slovene. As most of his clientele came from German-speaking regions, Rikli predominantly used German in public communication, and signage throughout the health resort was likewise in German. Local residents referred to him as "Švajcar" (the Swiss) and "the Sun Doctor".

Rikli established baths, walking and hiking paths, and housing facilities in Bled to support his therapeutic philosophy. In 1895, he constructed a villa and baths in the Swiss architectural style, along with a hospital featuring his own examination office. As word of his activities spread across Europe, a larger swimming area with promenade was added in 1899 to accommodate growing interest. Beyond those seeking healing, Bled began attracting visitors who wished to spend their holidays in a clean and health-conscious environment. The number of arrivals increased markedly after the railway station opened in Lesce in 1870.

In 1903, Bled was awarded a gold medal at an international exposition for healing destinations in Vienna, and by 1906, it had been recognised as one of the most prominent tourist resorts in the Austro-Hungarian Empire. Following Rikli's death in 1906, the health complex—which comprised a stately spa facility, a modest treatment salon (Kursalon), numerous air huts, and several designated air parks—entered a period of decline. The dissolution of Austrian authority at the end of the First World War further accelerated this process from 1918 onward. In the newly established Slovenia, characterised by a significantly stronger Slavic cultural influence, anything German fell out of favour, resulting in the Rikli family's loss of all property.

Rikli was commemorated with a statue marking the 50th anniversary of his healing practice. Each year from July onwards, Bled continues to honour his legacy with Rikli’s Sports Days—organised hikes, runs, and climbs along the original trails above the town. Rikli’s villa is now under cultural protection. As of 23 December 2024, the property is owned by entrepreneur Tim Mitja Zagar, who intends to restore the building to its former prominence as a symbol of Slovenian health tourism.

== Arnold Rikli Award ==
Since 2016, the Jörg Wolff Foundation in Germany has awarded annually the Arnold Rikli Prize, endowed with 10,000 euros, for photobiological research about the human organism; the award is under the patronage of the European Society for Photobiology (ESP).

From 1989 until its dissolution in 2005, the Light Symposium Foundation in Atlanta (USA) awarded the Arnold Rikli Prize, recognising research into the biological effects of light on humans.

== Bibliography ==
Rikli's books discussed the theory and practical methods of healing with air, sun, and steam baths. The books show a broad spectrum of natural healing places in Bled. Five of the books from the years 1872–1894 are held by the National and University Library of Slovenia. All the books are made out of wooden paper. The National and University Library of Slovenia is the only library that keeps the original books.

Rikli's books are:

- Arnold Rikli: Rikli‛s Bett - und Theildampfbäder, 3. verbesserte Auflage, 1872
- Arnold Rikli: Rikli‛s Bett - und Theildampfbäder, 4. verbesserte Auflage, 1889
- Arnold Rikli: Die Grundlehren der Naturheilkunde (first title "Allgemeine Curregeln") mit besonderer Berücksichtigung der atmosphärischen Cur, verbesserte Aufl., 1890
- Arnold Rikli: Die atmosphärische Kur oder das Lichtluftbad und das Sonnenbad und die Sonne der schärfste Diagnostiker und prognostiker, 4. verbesserte Auflage, 1894
- Arnold Rikli: Die atmosphärische Cur oder die Sonne der schärfste Diagnostiker und Prognostiker. Special Print from "Zeitschrift für Gesundheitspflege und Naturheilkunde", Berlin.

== See also ==
- Naturism
