= Röthenbach bei Herzogenbuchsee =

- Former municipality
- Flag Coat of arms
- Location of Röthenbach bei Herzogenbuchsee
- Location within Switzerland Location within Canton of Bern
- Coordinates: 47°12′N 7°41′E
- Country: Switzerland
- Canton: Bern
- District: Wangen

Area
  - Total: 2.1 km^{2} (0.81 sq mi)
- Elevation: 462 m (1,516 ft)

Population (December 2007)
  - Total: 338
  - Density: 160/km^{2} (420/sq mi)
- Time zone: UTC+01:00 (CET)
  - Summer (DST): UTC+02:00 (CEST)
- Postal code: 3373
- SFOS number: 986
- ISO 3166 code: CH-BE
- Surrounded by: Heimenhausen, Inkwil, Niederönz, Walliswil bei Wangen, Wangenried, Wanzwil
- Website: www.heimenhausen.ch

Röthenbach bei Herzogenbuchsee is a municipality in the district of Wangen in the canton of Bern in Switzerland.

On January 1, 2009, the municipalities of Wanzwil and Röthenbach bei Herzogenbuchsee became part of the municipality of Heimenhausen.

== Geography ==
Before the merger, Röthenbach bei Herzogenbuchsee had an area of 2.1 km^{2} (0.81 sq mi). Of this area, 58% is used for agricultural purposes, while 31.2% is forested. Of the rest of the land, 10.2% is settled (buildings or roads) and the remainder (0.5%) is non-productive (rivers, glaciers or mountains).

== Demographics ==
Before the merger, Röthenbach bei Herzogenbuchsee had a population (as of 2007) of 338, of which 1.2% are foreign nationals. Over the last 10 years the population has decreased at a rate of -1.7%. Most of the population (as of 2000) speaks German (98.7%), with French being second most common ( 0.6%) and Italian being third ( 0.3%).

In the 2007 election the most popular party was the SVP which received 49.1% of the vote. The next three most popular parties were the SPS (15.2%), the FDP (14.6%) and the CSP (9.4%).

The age distribution of the population (as of 2000) is children and teenagers (0–19 years old) make up 23.8% of the population, while adults (20–64 years old) make up 61.1% and seniors (over 64 years old) make up 15%. The entire Swiss population is generally well educated. In Röthenbach bei Herzogenbuchsee about 75.8% of the population (between age 25-64) have completed either non-mandatory upper secondary education or additional higher education (either University or a Fachhochschule).

Röthenbach bei Herzogenbuchsee has an unemployment rate of 1.03%. As of 2005, there were 25 people employed in the primary economic sector and about 10 businesses involved in this sector. 18 people are employed in the secondary sector and there are 4 businesses in this sector. 30 people are employed in the tertiary sector, with 11 businesses in this sector.
