= Niederönz =

- Municipality
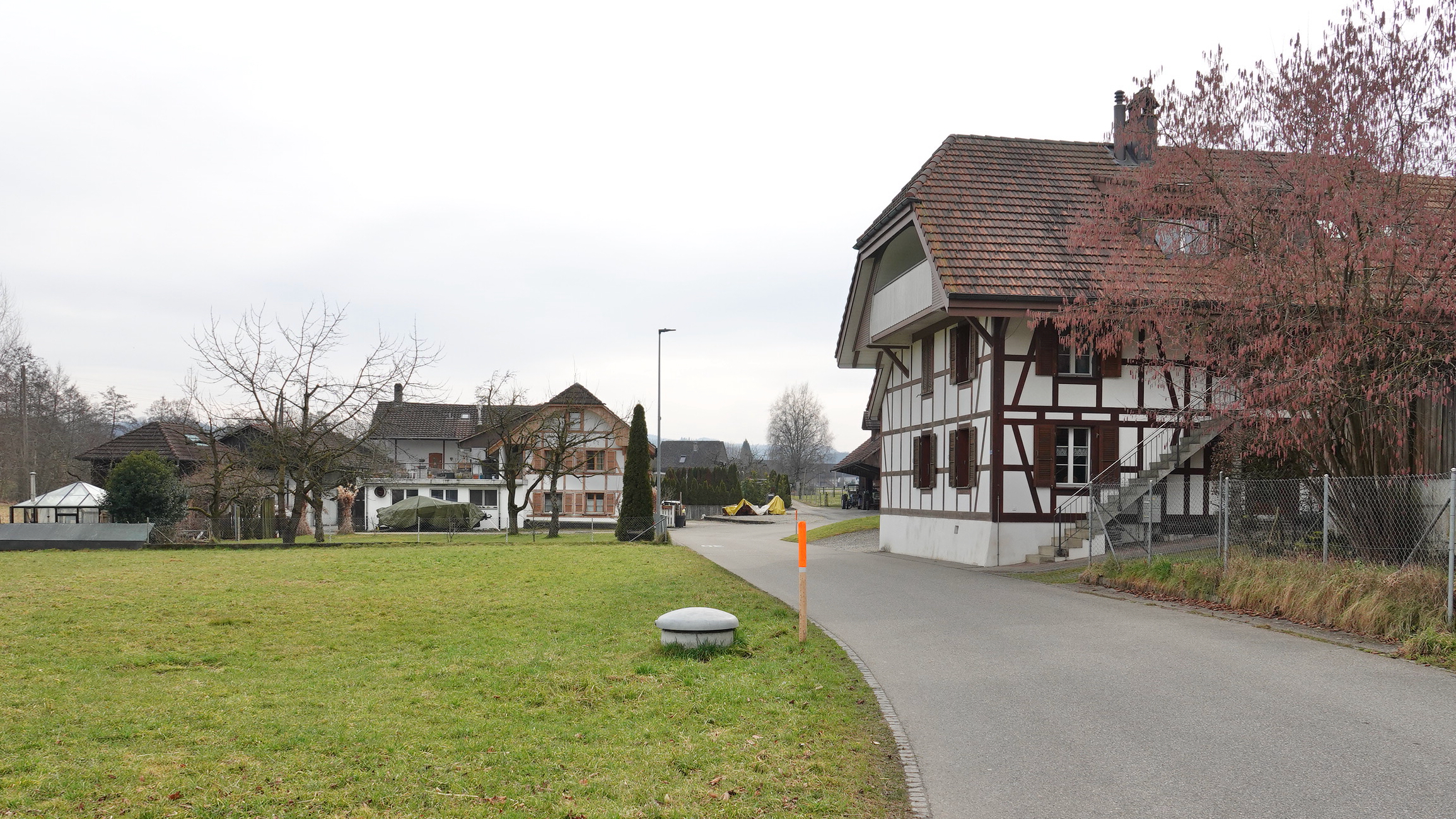
- View of Niederönz

- Flag Coat of arms
- Location of Niederönz
- Location within Switzerland Location within Canton of Bern
- Coordinates: 47°11′N 7°41′E
- Country: Switzerland
- Canton: Bern
- District: Oberaargau

Area
  - Total: 2.8 km^{2} (1.1 sq mi)
- Elevation: 460 m (1,510 ft)

Population (December 2020)
  - Total: 1,691
  - Density: 600/km^{2} (1,600/sq mi)
- Time zone: UTC+01:00 (CET)
  - Summer (DST): UTC+02:00 (CEST)
- Postal code: 3362
- SFOS number: 982
- ISO 3166 code: CH-BE
- Surrounded by: Aeschi (SO), Bolken (SO), Herzogenbuchsee, Inkwil, Oberönz, Röthenbach bei Herzogenbuchsee, Wanzwil
- Website: www.niederoenz.ch

Niederönz is a municipality in the Oberaargau administrative district in the canton of Bern in Switzerland.

== History ==
Niederönz is first mentioned in 1246 as Onza.

== Geography ==
Niederönz has an area, as of 2009, of 2.8 square kilometers (1.1 sq mi). Of this area, 1.48 km^{2} (0.57 sq mi) or 52.9% is used for agricultural purposes, while 0.82 km^{2} (0.32 sq mi) or 29.3% is forested. Of the rest of the land, 0.46 km^{2} (0.18 sq mi) or 16.4% is settled (buildings or roads), 0.01 km^{2} (2.5 acres) or 0.4% is either rivers or lakes and 0.01 km^{2} (2.5 acres) or 0.4% is unproductive land.

Of the built up area, industrial buildings made up 2.5% of the total area while housing and buildings made up 8.6% and transportation infrastructure made up 4.6%. Out of the forested land, 26.8% of the total land area is heavily forested and 2.5% is covered with orchards or small clusters of trees. Of the agricultural land, 31.4% is used for growing crops and 19.3% is pastures, while 2.1% is used for orchards or vine crops. All the water in the municipality is in rivers and streams.

The municipality is located along the Önz river. It includes the village sections of Dörfli, Fluhacker and Wiese.

== Demographics ==
Niederönz has a population (as of 31 December 2020) of 1,691. As of 2007, 6.7% of the population was made up of foreign nationals. Over the last 10 years the population has grown at a rate of 8%. Most of the population (as of 2000) speaks German (91.9%), with Italian being second most common ( 2.7%) and Turkish being third ( 1.8%).

In the 2007 election the most popular party was the SVP which received 36.6% of the vote. The next three most popular parties were the SPS (20.1%), the FDP (15.4%) and the Green Party (9.1%).

The age distribution of the population (as of 2000) is children and teenagers (0–19 years old) make up 23.8% of the population, while adults (20–64 years old) make up 62.2% and seniors (over 64 years old) make up 14%. In Niederönz about 76.7% of the population (between age 25-64) have completed either non-mandatory upper secondary education or additional higher education (either university or a Fachhochschule).

Niederönz has an unemployment rate of 0.96%. As of 2005, there were 37 people employed in the primary economic sector and about 12 businesses involved in this sector. 598 people are employed in the secondary sector and there are 21 businesses in this sector. 146 people are employed in the tertiary sector, with 34 businesses in this sector. The historical population is given in the following table:

year	population
1764	185
1850	435
1900	446
1950	574
2000	1,410
