= Oberbipp =

- Municipality
- Flag Coat of arms
- Location of Oberbipp
- Location within Switzerland Location within Canton of Bern
- Coordinates: 47°16′N 7°40′E
- Country: Switzerland
- Canton: Bern
- District: Oberaargau

Area
  - Total: 8.5 km^{2} (3.3 sq mi)
- Elevation: 500 m (1,600 ft)

Population (December 2020)
  - Total: 1,753
  - Density: 210/km^{2} (530/sq mi)
- Time zone: UTC+01:00 (CET)
  - Summer (DST): UTC+02:00 (CEST)
- Postal code: 4538
- SFOS number: 983
- ISO 3166 code: CH-BE
- Surrounded by: Bannwil, Niederbipp, Rumisberg, Walliswil bei Niederbipp, Wiedlisbach, Wolfisberg
- Website: www.oberbipp.ch

Oberbipp is a municipality in the Oberaargau administrative district in the canton of Bern in Switzerland.

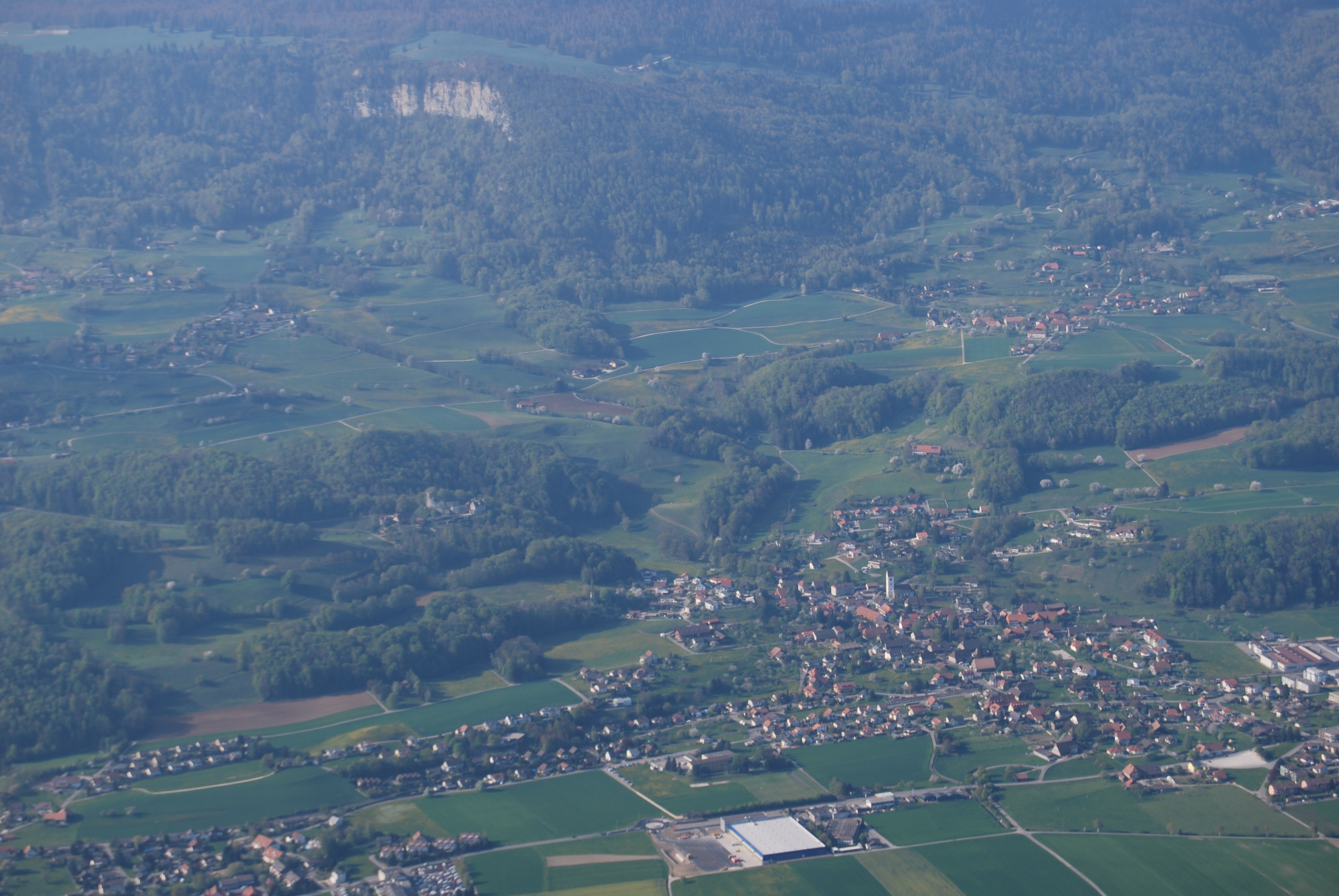
Aerial view of Oberbipp

== History ==
Aerial view (1947)

Oberbipp is first mentioned in 968 as Pippa. In 1327 it was mentioned as Obern Bipp.

== Geography ==
Oberbipp has an area, as of 2009, of 8.47 square kilometers (3.27 sq mi). Of this area, 3.98 km^{2} (1.54 sq mi) or 47.0% is used for agricultural purposes, while 3.35 km^{2} (1.29 sq mi) or 39.6% is forested. Of the rest of the land, 1.1 km^{2} (0.42 sq mi) or 13.0% is settled (buildings or roads), 0.03 km^{2} (7.4 acres) or 0.4% is either rivers or lakes and 0.03 km^{2} (7.4 acres) or 0.4% is unproductive land.

Of the built up area, housing and buildings made up 5.4% and transportation infrastructure made up 5.3%. Out of the forested land, 37.7% of the total land area is heavily forested and 1.9% is covered with orchards or small clusters of trees. Of the agricultural land, 32.0% is used for growing crops and 14.2% is pastures. All the water in the municipality is in rivers and streams.

The municipality is located on the southern slope of the Jura Mountains. It includes the village of Oberbipp, the section of Buchli and other scattered settlements.

== Demographics ==
Oberbipp has a population (as of 31 December 2020) of 1,753. As of 2007, 8.9% of the population was made up of foreign nationals. Over the last 10 years the population has grown at a rate of 10.4%. Most of the population (as of 2000) speaks German (91.9%), with Albanian being second most common ( 1.8%) and Serbo-Croatian being third ( 1.5%).

In the 2007 election the most popular party was the SVP which received 46% of the vote. The next two most popular parties were the FDP (17.3%), and the SP (17.3%).

The age distribution of the population (as of 2000) is children and teenagers (0–19 years old) make up 27.6% of the population, while adults (20–64 years old) make up 59.3% and seniors (over 64 years old) make up 13%. In Oberbipp about 76.5% of the population (between age 25-64) have completed either non-mandatory upper secondary education or additional higher education (either university or a Fachhochschule).

Oberbipp has an unemployment rate of 2.24%. As of 2005, there were 64 people employed in the primary economic sector and about 22 businesses involved in this sector. 181 people are employed in the secondary sector and there are 14 businesses in this sector. 174 people are employed in the tertiary sector, with 30 businesses in this sector. The historical population is given in the following table:

year	population
1764	447
1850	801
1900	801
1950	981
2000	1,407
