= Wangenried =

- Former municipality
- Flag Coat of arms
- Location of Wangenried
- Location within Switzerland Location within Canton of Bern
- Coordinates: 47°13′N 7°39′E
- Country: Switzerland
- Canton: Bern
- District: Oberaargau

Government
  - Executive: Gemeinderat with 5 members
  - Mayor: Gemeindepräsident

Area
  - Total: 2.9 km^{2} (1.1 sq mi)
- Elevation: 473 m (1,552 ft)

Population (December 2020)
  - Total: 407
  - Density: 140/km^{2} (360/sq mi)
- Time zone: UTC+01:00 (CET)
  - Summer (DST): UTC+02:00 (CEST)
- Postal code: 3374
- SFOS number: 993
- ISO 3166 code: CH-BE
- Surrounded by: Deitingen (SO), Inkwil, Röthenbach bei Herzogenbuchsee, Subingen (SO), Walliswil bei Wangen, Wangen an der Aare
- Website: www.wangenried.ch

Wangenried is a former municipality in the Oberaargau administrative district in the canton of Bern in Switzerland. On 1 January 2024 the former municipality of Wangenried merged to form the municipality of Wangen an der Aare.

== Geography ==
Aerial view by Walter Mittelholzer (1923)

Wangenried has an area of 2.9 km^{2} (1.1 sq mi). Of this area, 67.9% is used for agricultural purposes, while 24.1% is forested. Of the rest of the land, 6.9% is settled (buildings or roads) and the remainder (1%) is non-productive (rivers, glaciers or mountains).

== Demographics ==
Wangenried has a population (as of 31 December 2020) of 407. As of 2007, 3.5% of the population was made up of foreign nationals. Over the last 10 years the population has grown at a rate of 6.1%. Most of the population (as of 2000) speaks German (97.9%), with Italian being second most common ( 0.8%) and French being third ( 0.5%).

In the 2007 election the most popular party was the SVP which received 53.1% of the vote. The next three most popular parties were the SPS (17.4%), the FDP (10.8%) and the local small left-wing parties (6.6%).

The age distribution of the population (as of 2000) is children and teenagers (0–19 years old) make up 23% of the population, while adults (20–64 years old) make up 61.3% and seniors (over 64 years old) make up 15.7%. In Wangenried about 76.9% of the population (between age 25-64) have completed either non-mandatory upper secondary education or additional higher education (either university or a Fachhochschule).

Wangenried has an unemployment rate of 0.66%. As of 2005, there were 36 people employed in the primary economic sector and about 13 businesses involved in this sector. 46 people are employed in the secondary sector and there are 3 businesses in this sector. 42 people are employed in the tertiary sector, with 7 businesses in this sector.
