= Wiedlisbach =

- Municipality
- Flag Coat of arms
- Location of Wiedlisbach
- Location within Switzerland Location within Canton of Bern
- Coordinates: 47°15′N 7°38′E
- Country: Switzerland
- Canton: Bern
- District: Oberaargau

Area
  - Total: 7.5 km^{2} (2.9 sq mi)
- Elevation: 465 m (1,526 ft)

Population (December 2020)
  - Total: 2,382
  - Density: 320/km^{2} (820/sq mi)
- Time zone: UTC+01:00 (CET)
  - Summer (DST): UTC+02:00 (CEST)
- Postal code: 4537
- SFOS number: 995
- ISO 3166 code: CH-BE
- Surrounded by: Attiswil, Oberbipp, Rumisberg, Walliswil bei Niederbipp, Walliswil bei Wangen, Wangen an der Aare
- Website: www.wiedlisbach.ch

Wiedlisbach is a municipality in the Oberaargau administrative district in the canton of Bern in Switzerland.

In 1974, the Wakker Prize was bestowed on Wiedlisbach for the development and preservation of its architectural heritage.

== History ==
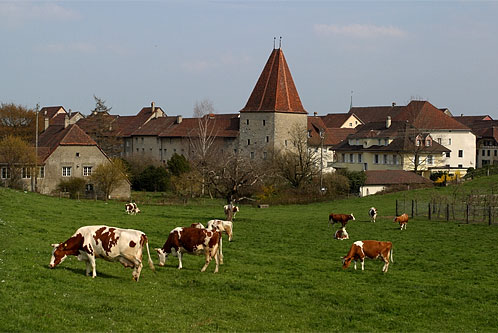
Wiedlisbach village and Städtliturm.

Aerial view from 300 m by Walter Mittelholzer (1925)

In the mid 13th century Count Ludwig the Elder von Frohburg built the fortified village of Wiedlisbach to collect tolls and host markets along the road to Zofingen. The village was built as rectangle with a large central market plaza astride the east-west running road. A combination tower house and defensive tower, known as the Städtliturm, was built in the north-west corner, and likely served as a residence of the count's local representative. The village wall, up to 9 m (30 ft) tall and 1.7 m (5.6 ft) thick, had two gates, the Biel gate to the west and the Basel gate to the east. The village was first mentioned in 1275 as oppidum or municipium Wietilspach.

During the 13th and 14th century a local noble family, the von Wiedlisbach family, appeared in the village, probably in service to which ever noble family owned it. When the Frohberg family died out, Wiedlisbach passed to the Counts of Neuchâtel-Nidau in the late 13th century. Count Rudolph of Neuchâtel-Nidau appears in the record as ruler of nearby Bipp Castle in 1297 and in 1313 was documented as ruling over Wiedlisbach. In 1375 it passed into the estates of the Homberg/Thierstein family and was attacked by a band of Gugler knights. A few years later it was acquired by the Kyburgs. However, after a disastrous Kyburg raid in 1383 led to the Burgdorferkrieg and poverty for the family, Wiedlisbach was sold to Bern and Solothurn in 1406. In 1463 it was acquired wholly by Bern and has remained part of the Canton of Bern since then.

During the Swiss peasant war of 1653, Wiedlisbach joined the uprising. The uprising was quickly suppressed and on 5 June 1653 the town fell to the attacking government troops. However, the town walls, gate houses and tower were not destroyed. The victorious Bernese troops plundered the town and took away the wooden gates. The gate towers remained intact but open until 1827, when they were finally demolished to make way for new roads.

== Geography ==
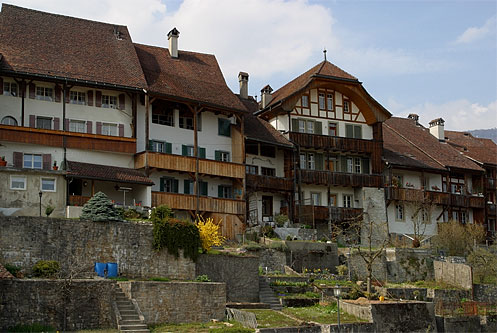
View of the southside of Wiedlisbach

Wiedlisbach has an area of 7.6 km^{2} (2.9 sq mi). Of this area, 49.5% is used for agricultural purposes, while 29% is forested. Of the rest of the land, 19.7% is settled (buildings or roads) and the remainder (1.7%) is non-productive (rivers, glaciers or mountains).

== Demographics ==
Wiedlisbach has a population (as of 31 December 2020) of 2,382. As of 2007, 12.1% of the population was made up of foreign nationals. Over the last 10 years the population has decreased at a rate of −0.3%. Most of the population (as of 2000) speaks German (93.0%), with Albanian being second most common ( 1.4%) and Serbo-Croatian being third ( 1.4%).

In the 2007 election the most popular party was the SVP which received 39.9% of the vote. The next three most popular parties were the SPS (21.3%), the FDP (14.3%) and the Green Party (8%).

The age distribution of the population (as of 2000) is children and teenagers (0–19 years old) make up 21.3% of the population, while adults (20–64 years old) make up 57.1% and seniors (over 64 years old) make up 21.6%. In Wiedlisbach about 70.5% of the population (between age 25–64) have completed either non-mandatory upper secondary education or additional higher education (either university or a Fachhochschule).

Wiedlisbach has an unemployment rate of 1.43%. As of 2005, there were 76 people employed in the primary economic sector and about 23 businesses involved in this sector. 251 people are employed in the secondary sector and there are 37 businesses in this sector. 608 people are employed in the tertiary sector, with 88 businesses in this sector.

== Wakker Prize ==
In 1974 Wiedlisbach was awarded the Wakker Prize for preservation of the old village. The prize noted that the character, old construction and traditional appearance had been maintained. It praised the efforts of the old city committee to make all the inhabitants of the village aware of the value of preserving the appearance of the village.

== Notable people ==
- Michael Kurt (born 1980 in Wiedlisbach) a Swiss slalom canoeist who competed at the international level from 1996 to 2016
