= Wingen =

Wingen may refer to:

- Wingen, New South Wales in Australia
- Wingen, Bas-Rhin, in the arrondissement of Wissembourg in the communes of the Bas-Rhin department in France
- Wingen-sur-Moder, a commune in the Bas-Rhin department in Alsace
