= Attiswil =

- Municipality
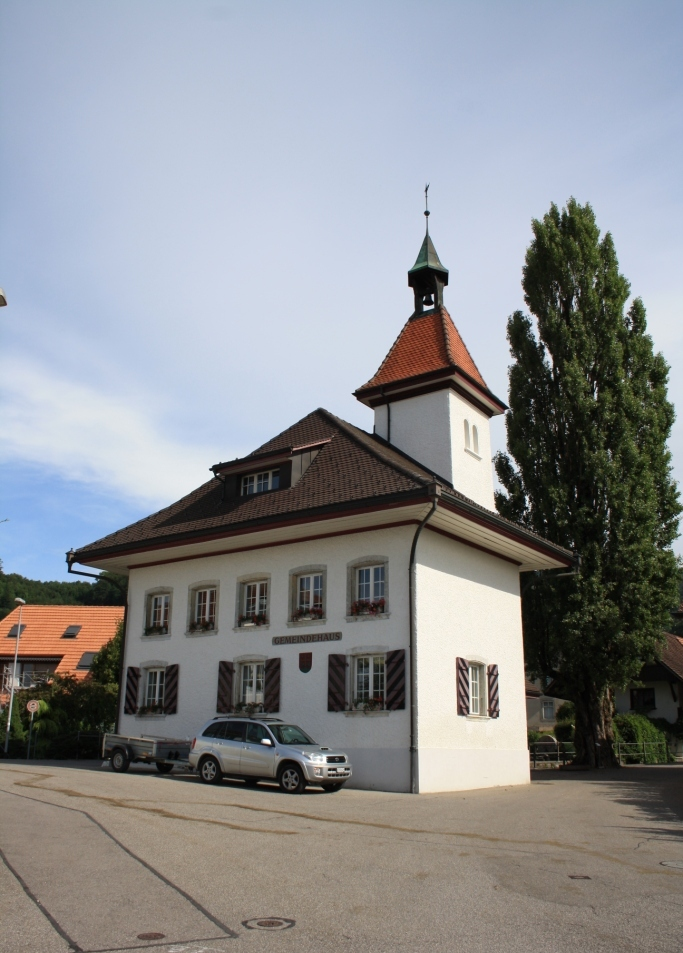
- Municipal administration building in Attiswil village

- Flag Coat of arms
- Location of Attiswil
- Location within Switzerland Location within Canton of Bern
- Coordinates: 47°14′N 7°36′E
- Country: Switzerland
- Canton: Bern
- District: Oberaargau

Government
  - Mayor: Daniel Zumstein

Area
  - Total: 7.7 km^{2} (3.0 sq mi)
- Elevation: 464 m (1,522 ft)

Population (Dec 2012)
  - Total: 1,324
  - Density: 170/km^{2} (450/sq mi)
- Time zone: UTC+01:00 (CET)
  - Summer (DST): UTC+02:00 (CEST)
- Postal code: 4536
- SFOS number: 971
- ISO 3166 code: CH-BE
- Surrounded by: Farnern, Flumenthal (SO), Günsberg (SO), Hubersdorf (SO), Kammersrohr (SO), Rumisberg, Wangen an der Aare, Wiedlisbach
- Website: www.attiswil.ch

Attiswil is a municipality in the Oberaargau administrative district in the canton of Bern in Switzerland.

== History ==
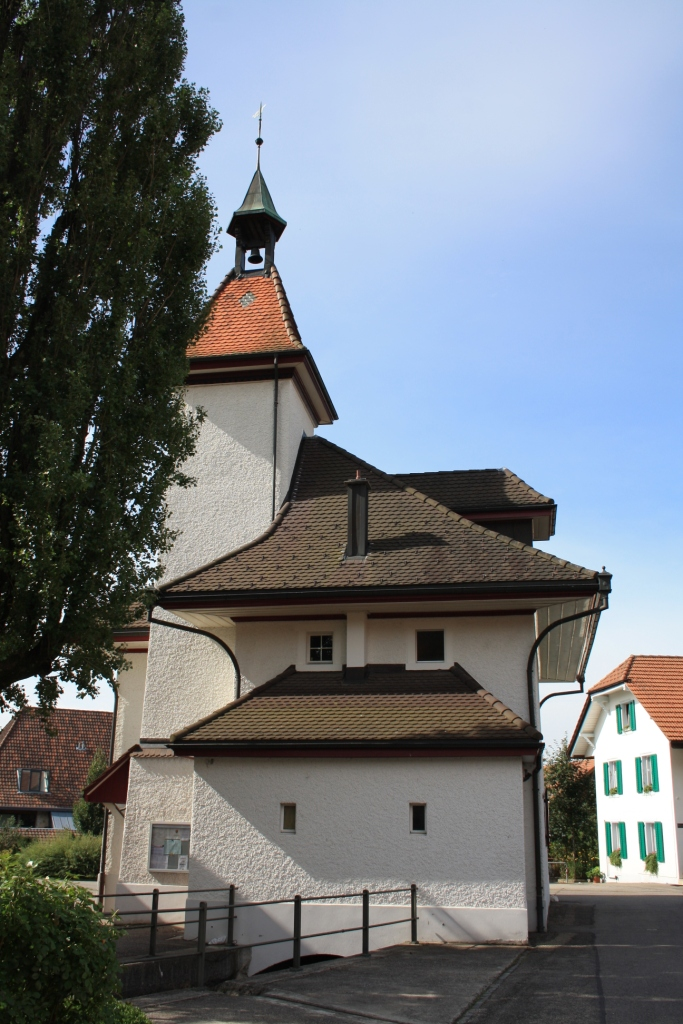
Former school house, now municipal administration building

Attiswil is first mentioned in 1364 as Attenswile.

The region around the Aare river was inhabited at least as early as the Mesolithic. The remains of Mesolithic, Bronze Age and La Tène settlements have been discovered in the municipality. A number of farms and villages existed in the area during the Roman era, along with a menhir or standing stone that may predate the Romans.

During the Middle Ages the village was part of the Herrschaft of Bipp. In 1413 the cities of Solothurn and Bern acquired the entire Herrschaft which they jointly administered. In 1463 Bern fully acquired the Herrschaft and the Attiswil village became part of the court of Wiedlisbach in the Bipp District. Religiously it was part of the Flumenthal parish in the Canton of Solothurn. However, in 1528, Bern adopted the new faith of the Protestant Reformation and required the entire Canton to convert. Solothurn, on the other hand, remained with the old Catholic faith. In 1533 Bern forced Attiswil to leave the Catholic Flumenthal parish and join the newly created Reformed Oberbipp parish. A new parish church was built in Attiswil in 1948. Following the 1798 French invasion, Attiswil became part of the Helvetic Republic district of Wangen.

The first school in the village is mentioned in 1633. In 1707 a schoolhouse was built. Today the old schoolhouse is the municipal administration building.

== Geography ==
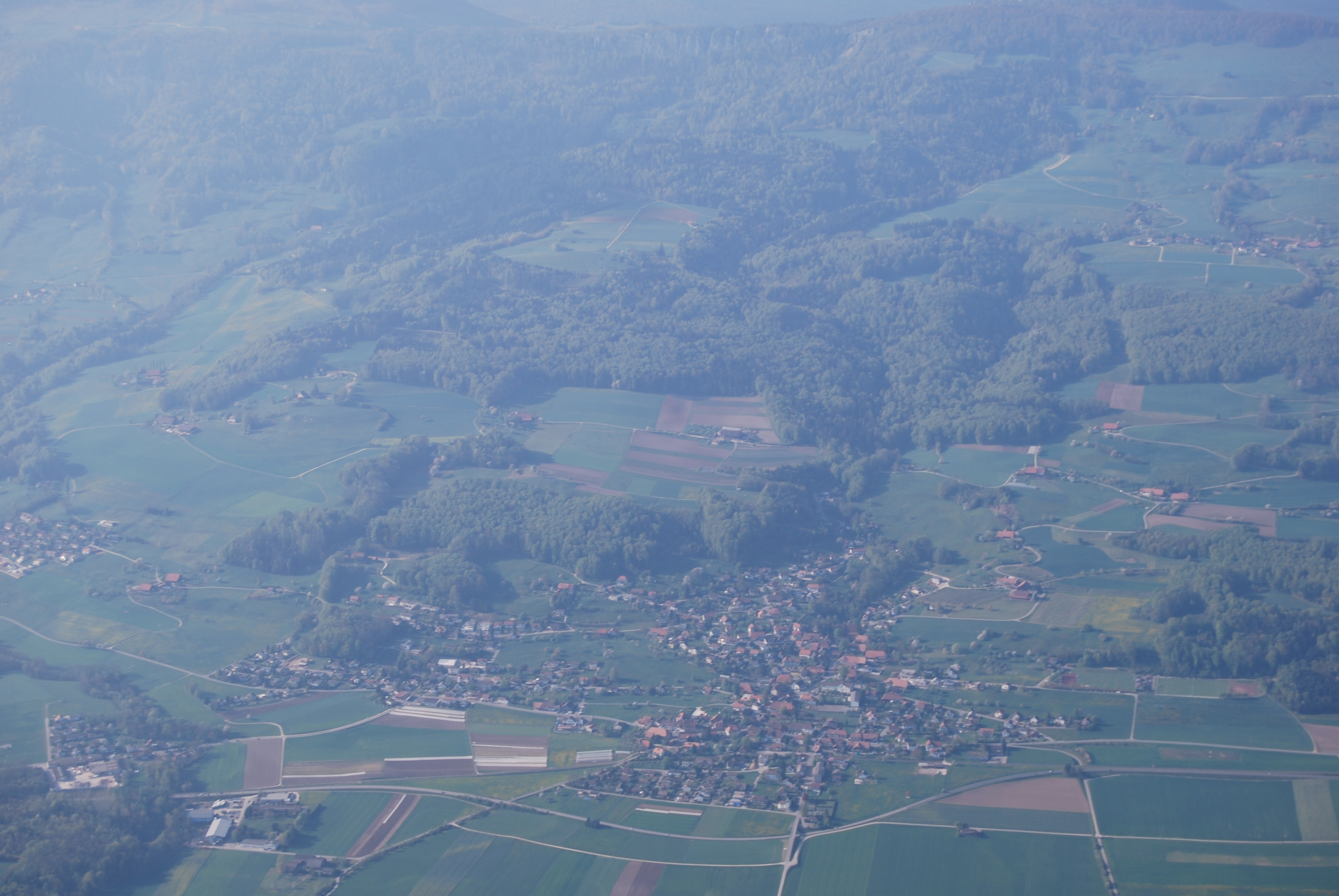
Aerial view of Attiswil (center, foreground) and surrounding villages and countryside.

Aerial view by Walter Mittelholzer (1925)

Attiswil has an area of 7.65 km^{2} (2.95 sq mi). As of the 2005 survey, a total of 4.06 km^{2} (1.57 mi^{2}) or 53.1% is used for agricultural purposes, while 2.69 km^{2} (1.04 mi^{2}) or 35.2% is forested. Of rest of the municipality 0.84 km^{2} (0.32 mi^{2}) or 11.0% is settled (buildings or roads), 0.03 km^{2} (7.4 acres) or 0.4% is either rivers or lakes and 0.02 km^{2} (4.9 acres) or 0.3% is unproductive land.

From the same survey, housing and buildings made up 5.1% and transportation infrastructure made up 2.7%. Power and water infrastructure as well as other special developed areas made up 2.0% of the area A total of 33.5% of the total land area is heavily forested and 1.7% is covered with orchards or small clusters of trees. Of the agricultural land, 33.5% is used for growing crops and 14.9% is pasturage, while 2.6% is used for orchards or vine crops and 2.1% is used for alpine pastures. All the water in the municipality is flowing water.

The municipality is located near the Aare river, but since 1881 does not touch the river. The borders include the plains around the Aare river and the Bettlerküche (elevation 1,074 m [3,524 ft]) a mountain in the Jura Mountains.

On 31 December 2009 Amtsbezirk Wangen, the municipality's former district, was dissolved. On the following day, 1 January 2010, it joined the newly created Verwaltungskreis Oberaargau.

== Coat of arms ==
The blazon of the municipal coat of arms is Gules a Cross pattee couped Or between in chief two Mullets of the same and in base two Trefoilts issuant from a Mount of 3 Coupeaux Vert.

== Demographics ==
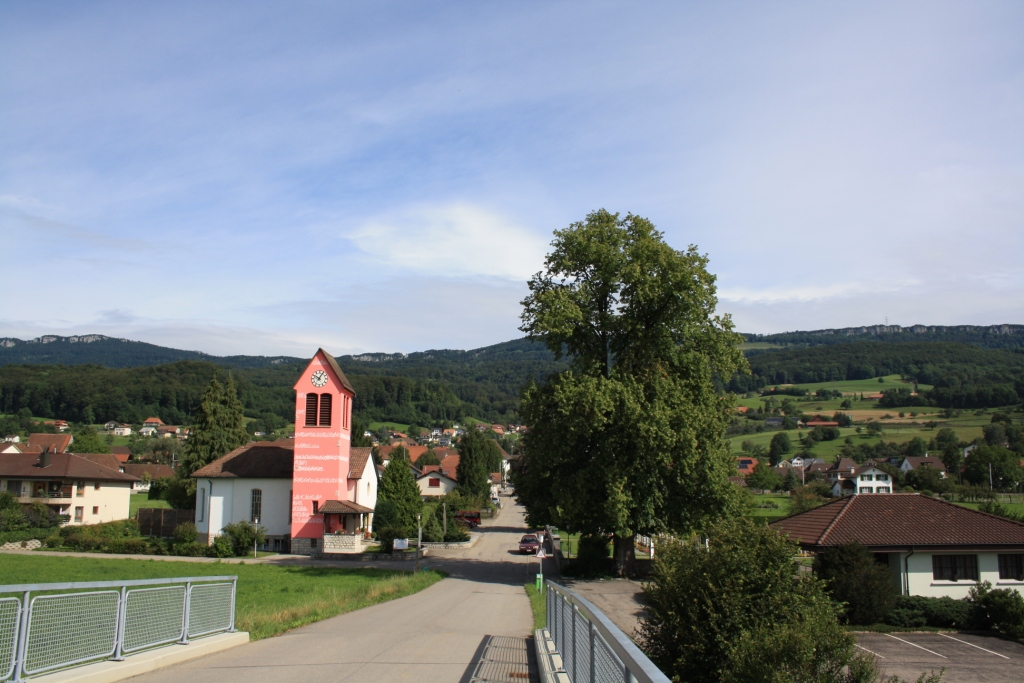
Attiswil church and nearby houses

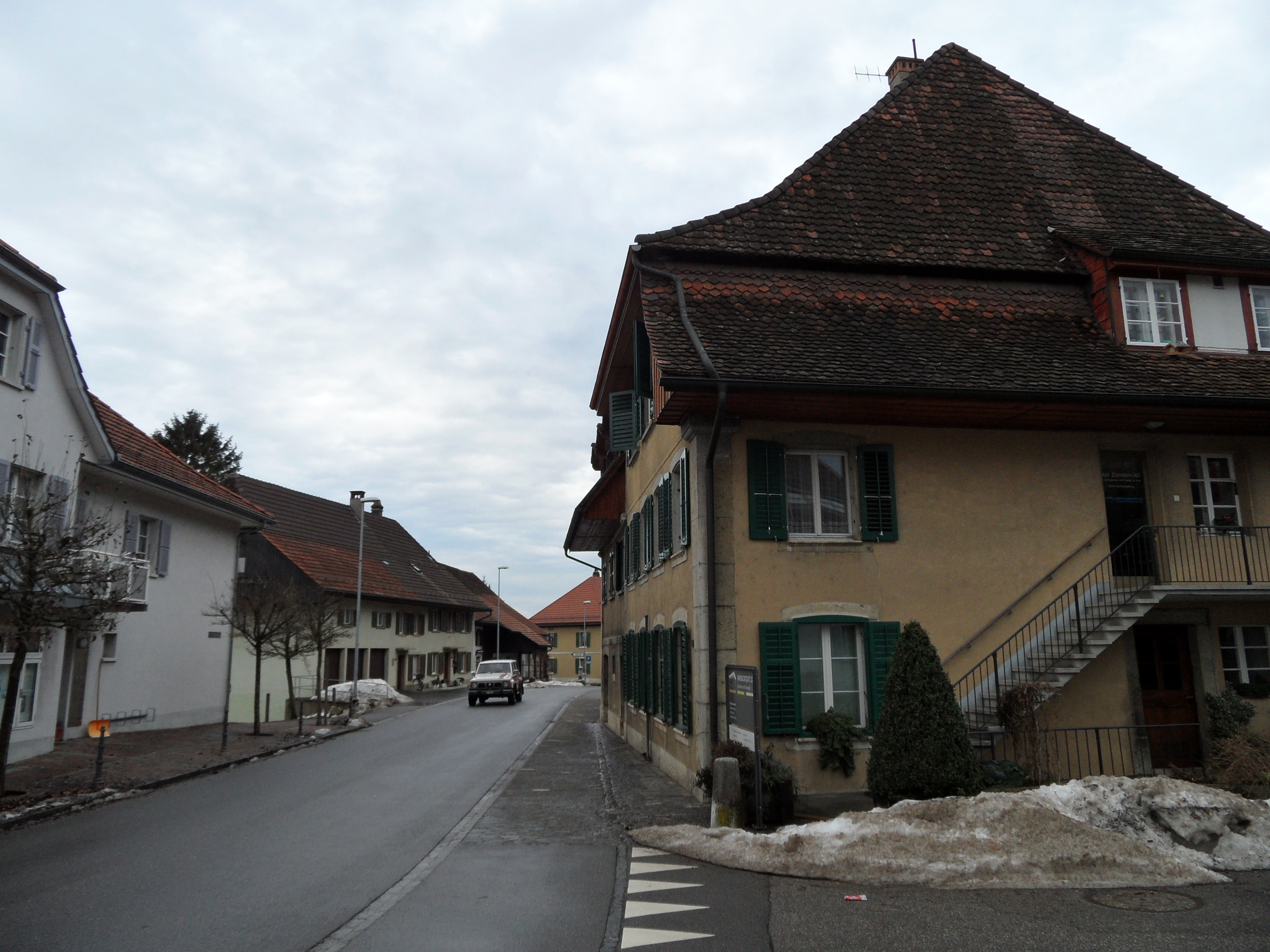
Houses and buildings in Attiswil

Attiswil has a population (as of December 2020) of 1,532. As of 2012, 7.8% of the population are resident foreign nationals. Between the last 2 years (2010-2012) the population changed at a rate of -0.1%. Migration accounted for 1.3%, while births and deaths accounted for -0.9%.

Most of the population (as of 2000) speaks German (1,262 or 94.6%) as their first language, Serbo-Croatian is the second most common (19 or 1.4%) and Italian is the third (15 or 1.1%). There are 5 people who speak French.

As of 2013, the population was 50.0% male and 50.0% female. The population was made up of 619 Swiss men (45.1% of the population) and 68 (4.9%) non-Swiss men. There were 625 Swiss women (45.5%) and 62 (4.5%) non-Swiss women. Of the population in the municipality, 561 or about 42.1% were born in Attiswil and lived there in 2000. There were 262 or 19.6% who were born in the same canton, while 385 or 28.9% were born somewhere else in Switzerland, and 120 or 9.0% were born outside of Switzerland.

As of 2012, children and teenagers (0–19 years old) make up 18.1% of the population, while adults (20–64 years old) make up 58.5% and seniors (over 64 years old) make up 23.5%.

As of 2000, there were 490 people who were single and never married in the municipality. There were 698 married individuals, 89 widows or widowers and 57 individuals who are divorced.

As of 2010, there were 184 households that consist of only one person and 38 households with five or more people. In 2000, a total of 561 apartments (91.7% of the total) were permanently occupied, while 20 apartments (3.3%) were seasonally occupied and 31 apartments (5.1%) were empty. As of 2012, the construction rate of new housing units was 1.5 new units per 1000 residents. The vacancy rate for the municipality, in 2013, was 2.7%. In 2012, single family homes made up 65.0% of the total housing in the municipality.

The historical population is given in the following chart:

== Economy ==
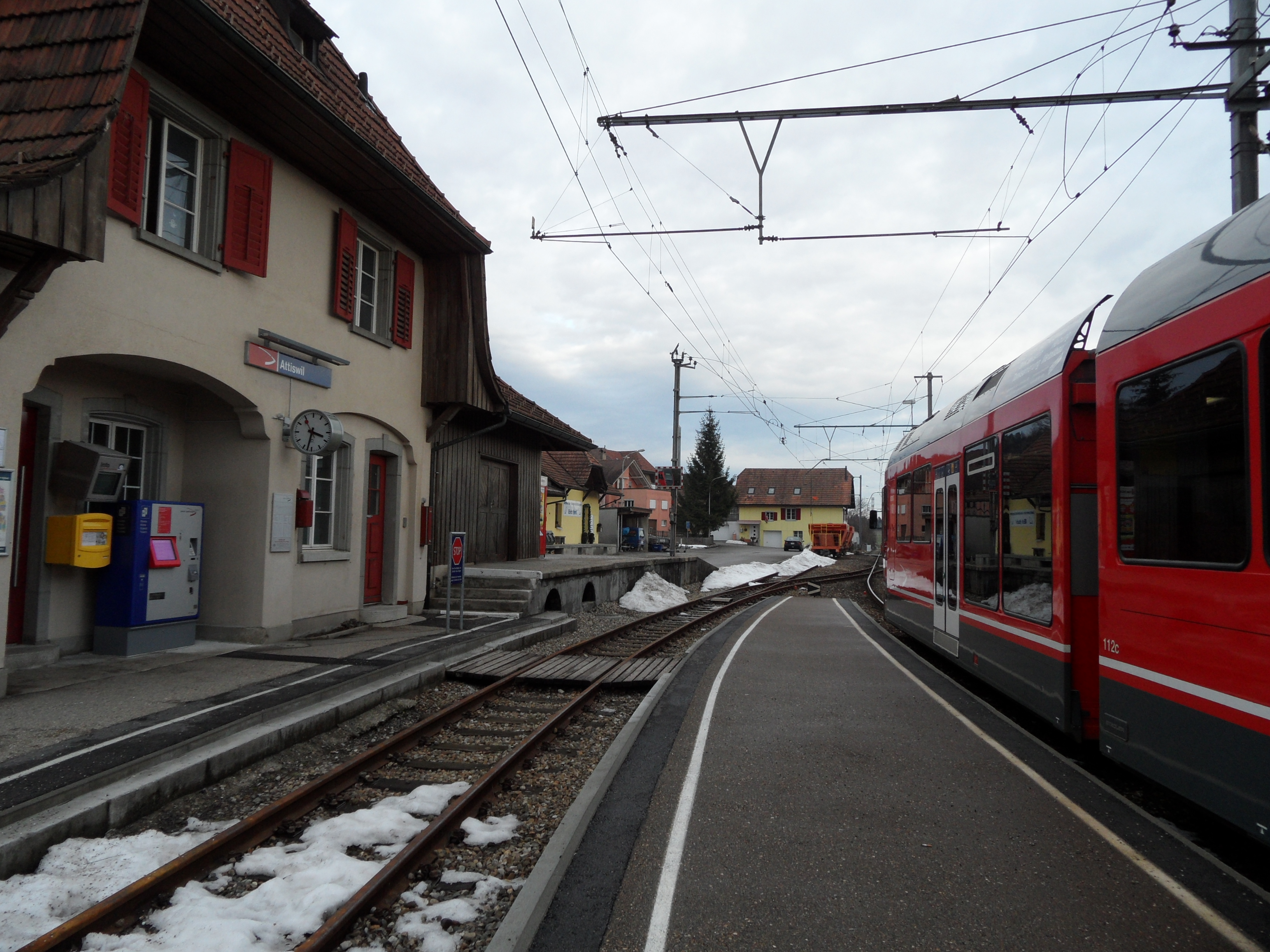
Attiswil railroad station. Many residents commute to jobs in Solothurn or other towns

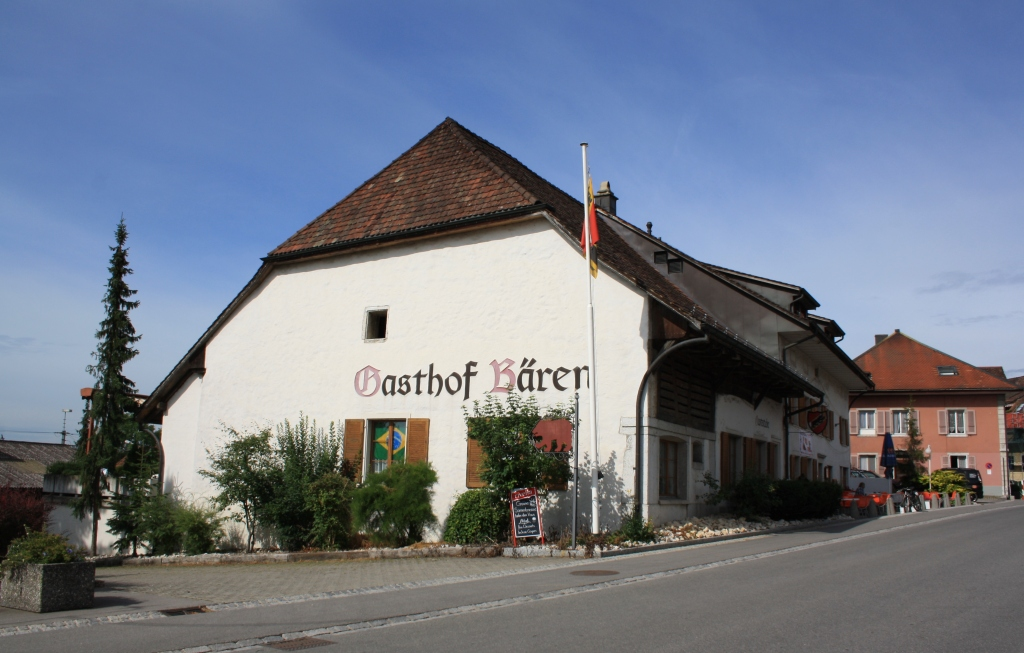
The Gasthof Bären in Attiswil

As of 2011, Attiswil had an unemployment rate of 2.27%. As of 2011, there were a total of 359 people employed in the municipality. Of these, there were 75 people employed in the primary economic sector and about 22 businesses involved in this sector. The secondary sector employs 90 people and there were 19 businesses in this sector. The tertiary sector employs 194 people, with 59 businesses in this sector. There were 705 residents of the municipality who were employed in some capacity, of which females made up 41.1% of the workforce.

In 2008 there were a total of 240 full-time equivalent jobs. The number of jobs in the primary sector was 49, of which 47 were in agriculture and 2 were in forestry or lumber production. The number of jobs in the secondary sector was 105 of which 33 or (31.4%) were in manufacturing, 31 or (29.5%) were in mining and 40 (38.1%) were in construction. The number of jobs in the tertiary sector was 86. In the tertiary sector; 22 or 25.6% were in wholesale or retail sales or the repair of motor vehicles, 15 or 17.4% were in the movement and storage of goods, 8 or 9.3% were in a hotel or restaurant, 2 or 2.3% were the insurance or financial industry, 10 or 11.6% were technical professionals or scientists, 9 or 10.5% were in education and 2 or 2.3% were in health care.

In 2000, there were 111 workers who commuted into the municipality and 504 workers who commuted away. The municipality is a net exporter of workers, with about 4.5 workers leaving the municipality for every one entering. A total of 201 workers (64.4% of the 312 total workers in the municipality) both lived and worked in Attiswil. Of the working population, 11.6% used public transportation to get to work, and 59.6% used a private car.

In 2013 the average church, local and cantonal tax rate on a married resident, with two children, of Attiswil making 150,000 CHF was 11.4%, while an unmarried resident's rate was 17.5%. For comparison, the median rate for all municipalities in the entire canton was 11.7% and 18.1%, while the nationwide median was 10.6% and 17.4% respectively.

In 2011 there were a total of 576 tax payers in the municipality. Of that total, 159 made over 75,000 CHF per year. There was one person who made between 15,000 and 20,000 per year. The average income of the over 75,000 CHF group in Attiswil was 109,309 CHF, while the average across all of Switzerland was 136,785 CHF.

In 2011 a total of 2.5% of the population received direct financial assistance from the government.

== Sights ==
The entire village of Attiswil is designated as part of the Inventory of Swiss Heritage Sites.

== Politics ==
In the 2011 federal election the most popular party was the Swiss People's Party (SVP) which received 36.6% of the vote. The next three most popular parties were the Social Democratic Party (SP) (19.0%), the Conservative Democratic Party (BDP) (18.8%) and the FDP.The Liberals (9.2%). In the federal election, a total of 526 votes were cast, and the voter turnout was 51.6%.

== Religion ==
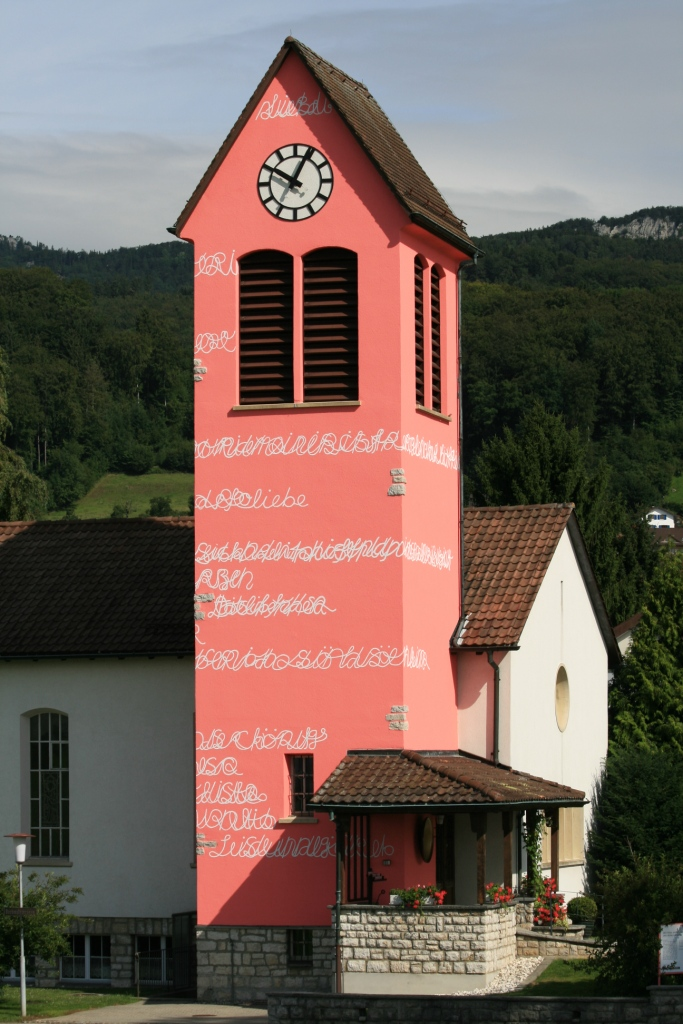
Attiswil Swiss Reformed church, built in 1948.

From the 2000 census, 953 or 71.4% belonged to the Swiss Reformed Church, while 230 or 17.2% were Roman Catholic. Of the rest of the population, there were 13 members of an Orthodox church (or about 0.97% of the population), there were 3 individuals (or about 0.22% of the population) who belonged to the Christian Catholic Church, and there were 18 individuals (or about 1.35% of the population) who belonged to another Christian church. There were 18 (or about 1.35% of the population) who were Muslim. There were 4 individuals who were Hindu. 82 (or about 6.15% of the population) belonged to no church, are agnostic or atheist, and 13 individuals (or about 0.97% of the population) did not answer the question.

== Education ==
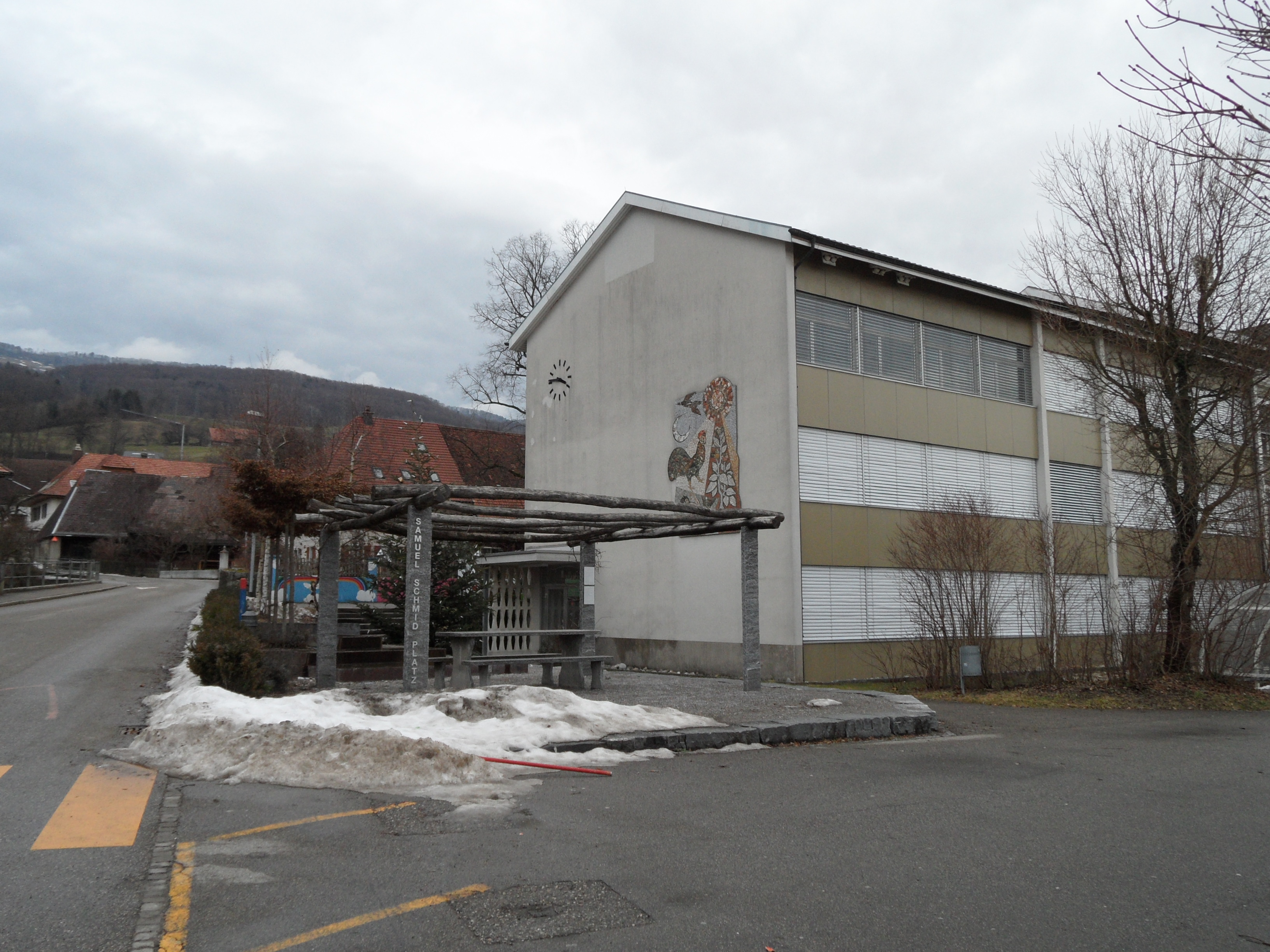
New school building in Attiswil

In Attiswil about 62.7% of the population have completed non-mandatory upper secondary education, and 14.7% have completed additional higher education (either university or a Fachhochschule). Of the 120 who had completed some form of tertiary schooling listed in the census, 75.8% were Swiss men, 15.0% were Swiss women, 4.2% were non-Swiss men and 5.0% were non-Swiss women.

The Canton of Bern school system provides one year of non-obligatory Kindergarten, followed by six years of Primary school. This is followed by three years of obligatory lower Secondary school where the students are separated according to ability and aptitude. Following the lower Secondary students may attend additional schooling or they may enter an apprenticeship.

During the 2012-13 school year, there were a total of 97 students attending classes in Attiswil. There were a total of 23 students in the German language kindergarten classes in the municipality. Of the kindergarten students, 8.7% were permanent or temporary residents of Switzerland (not citizens) and 13.0% have a different mother language than the classroom language. The municipality's primary school had 74 students in German language classes. Of the primary students, 6.8% were permanent or temporary residents of Switzerland (not citizens) and 9.5% have a different mother language than the classroom language.

As of 2000, there were a total of 143 students attending any school in the municipality. Of those, 139 both lived and attended school in the municipality, while 4 students came from another municipality. During the same year, 43 residents attended schools outside the municipality.
