= Inkwil =

- Municipality
- Flag Coat of arms
- Location of Inkwil
- Location within Switzerland Location within Canton of Bern
- Coordinates: 47°12′N 7°40′E
- Country: Switzerland
- Canton: Bern
- District: Oberaargau

Area
  - Total: 3.4 km^{2} (1.3 sq mi)
- Elevation: 464 m (1,522 ft)

Population (December 2020)
  - Total: 628
  - Density: 180/km^{2} (480/sq mi)
- Time zone: UTC+01:00 (CET)
  - Summer (DST): UTC+02:00 (CEST)
- Postal code: 3375
- SFOS number: 980
- ISO 3166 code: CH-BE
- Surrounded by: Bolken (SO), Niederönz, Röthenbach bei Herzogenbuchsee, Subingen (SO), Wangenried
- Website: www.inkwil.ch

Inkwil is a municipality in the Oberaargau administrative district in the canton of Bern in Switzerland.

== History ==
Inkwil is first mentioned in 1262 as Inchwile.

== Geography ==
Inkwil has an area, as of 2009, of 3.36 km^{2} (1.30 sq mi). Of this area, 1.65 km^{2} (0.64 sq mi) or 49.1% is used for agricultural purposes, while 1.21 km^{2} (0.47 sq mi) or 36.0% is forested. Of the rest of the land, 0.44 km^{2} (0.17 sq mi) or 13.1% is settled (buildings or roads), 0.05 km^{2} (12 acres) or 1.5% is either rivers or lakes and 0.03 km^{2} (7.4 acres) or 0.9% is unproductive land.

Of the built up area, housing and buildings made up 7.1% and transportation infrastructure made up 5.7%. 35.1% of the total land area is heavily forested. Of the agricultural land, 37.5% is used for growing crops and 8.9% is pastures, while 2.7% is used for orchards or vine crops. All the water in the municipality is in lakes.

It is divided into three sections; Dorf, Vorstatt and Station.

== Demographics ==
Inkwil has a population (as of 31 December 2020) of 628. As of 2007, 4.0% of the population was made up of foreign nationals. Over the last 10 years the population has decreased at a rate of -2.4%. Most of the population (as of 2000) speaks German (98.0%), with Portuguese being second most common ( 0.5%) and Serbo-Croatian being third ( 0.5%).

In the 2007 election the most popular party was the SVP which received 36.8% of the vote. The next three most popular parties were the SPS (29.8%), the FDP (13.7%) and the CSP (5.4%).

The age distribution of the population (as of 2000) is children and teenagers (0–19 years old) make up 26.6% of the population, while adults (20–64 years old) make up 58.4% and seniors (over 64 years old) make up 15%. About 82.2% of the population (between age 25–64) have completed either non-mandatory upper secondary education or additional higher education (either university or a Fachhochschule).

Inkwil has an unemployment rate of 1.64%. As of 2005, there were 20 people employed in the primary economic sector and about 8 businesses involved in this sector. 69 people are employed in the secondary sector and there are 6 businesses in this sector. 20 people are employed in the tertiary sector, with 10 businesses in this sector. The historical population is given in the following table:

year	population
1764	154
1850	420
1900	442
1950	507
2000	654

== Heritage sites of national significance ==
It is home to the Inkwilersee Insel prehistoric pile-dwelling (or stilt house) settlements that are part of the Prehistoric Pile dwellings around the Alps UNESCO World Heritage Site.
