= Niederbipp =

- Municipality
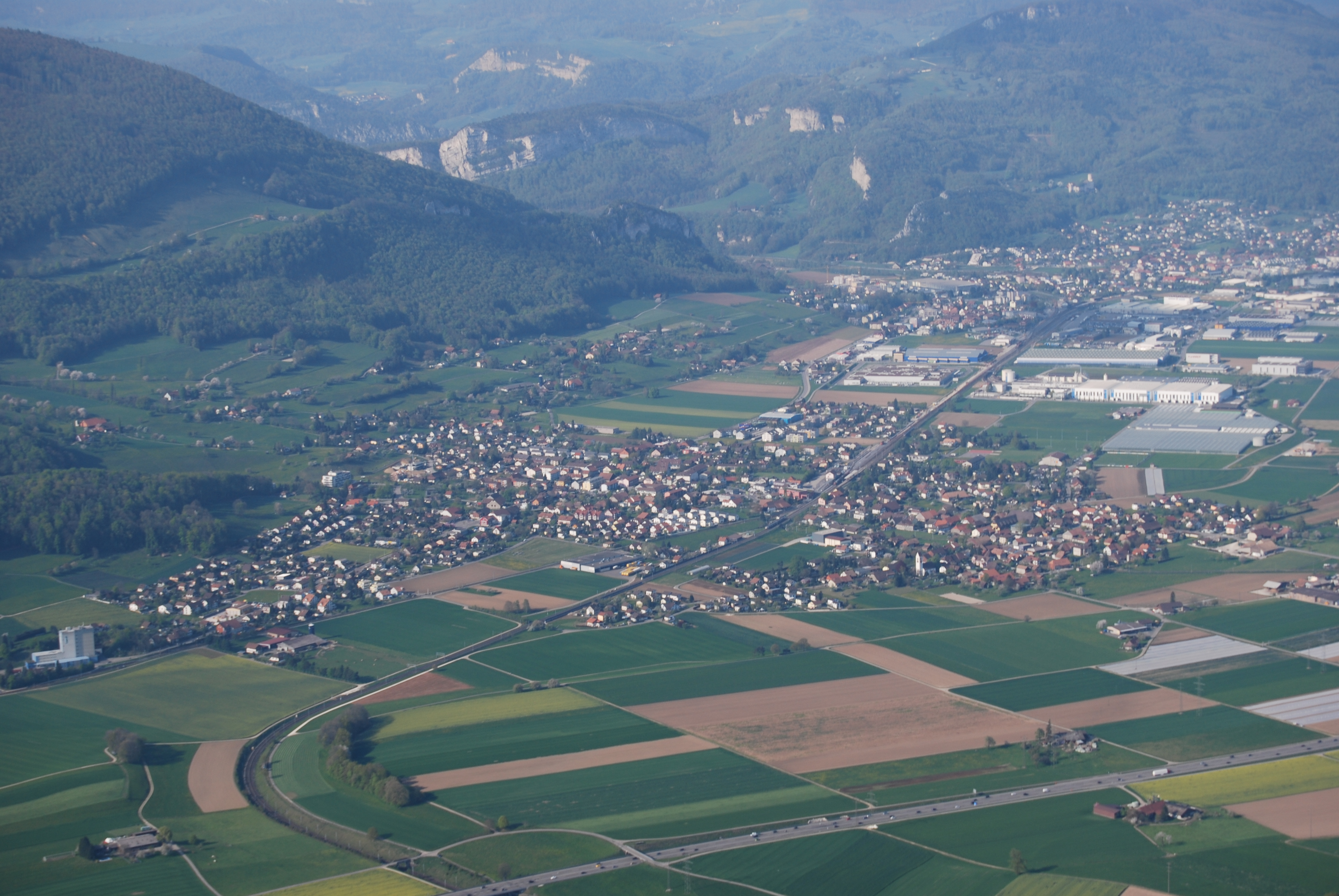
- Aerial view of Niederbipp

- Flag Coat of arms
- Location of Niederbipp
- Location within Switzerland Location within Canton of Bern
- Coordinates: 47°16′N 7°42′E
- Country: Switzerland
- Canton: Bern
- District: Oberaargau

Area
  - Total: 17.5 km^{2} (6.8 sq mi)
- Elevation: 468 m (1,535 ft)

Population (December 2020)
  - Total: 5,097
  - Density: 291/km^{2} (754/sq mi)
- Time zone: UTC+01:00 (CET)
  - Summer (DST): UTC+02:00 (CEST)
- Postal code: 4704
- SFOS number: 981
- ISO 3166 code: CH-BE
- Surrounded by: Balsthal (SO), Bannwil, Kestenholz (SO), Laupersdorf (SO), Oberbipp, Oensingen (SO), Schwarzhäusern, Wolfisberg
- Website: www.niederbipp.ch

Niederbipp is a municipality in the Oberaargau administrative district in the canton of Bern in Switzerland. On 1 January 2020 the former municipality of Wolfisberg merged into Niederbipp.

== History ==
Niederbipp is first mentioned in 968 as Pippa. In 1302 it was mentioned as Nider-Bippe.

== Geography ==
Aerial view by Walter Mittelholzer (1925)

Niederbipp has an area, as of 2009, of 17.37 square kilometers (6.71 sq mi). Of this area, 8.2 km^{2} (3.2 sq mi) or 47.2% is used for agricultural purposes, while 6.55 km^{2} (2.53 sq mi) or 37.7% is forested. Of the rest of the land, 2.64 km^{2} (1.02 sq mi) or 15.2% is settled (buildings or roads) and 0.06 km^{2} (15 acres) or 0.3% is unproductive land.

Of the built up area, industrial buildings made up 1.9% of the total area while housing and buildings made up 5.9% and transportation infrastructure made up 5.0%. Power and water infrastructure as well as other special developed areas made up 1.7% of the area Out of the forested land, 36.6% of the total land area is heavily forested and 1.2% is covered with orchards or small clusters of trees. Of the agricultural land, 34.1% is used for growing crops and 10.6% is pastures, while 1.3% is used for orchards or vine crops and 1.2% is used for alpine pastures.

The municipality is located on the southern flank of the Jura Mountains. It includes the village of Niederbipp, the hamlets of Walde, Holzhüsere and Lehn and scattered individual houses.

== Demographics ==
Niederbipp has a population (as of 31 December 2020) of 5,097. As of 2007, 18.0% of the population was made up of foreign nationals. Over the last 10 years the population has grown at a rate of 5.1%. Most of the population (as of 2000) speaks German (89.0%), with Serbo-Croatian being second most common ( 3.1%) and Albanian being third ( 1.8%).

In the 2007 election the most popular party was the SVP which received 43.8% of the vote. The next three most popular parties were the SPS (19.8%), the FDP (19.2%) and the Green Party (6.2%).

The age distribution of the population (as of 2000) is children and teenagers (0–19 years old) make up 25.5% of the population, while adults (20–64 years old) make up 58.2% and seniors (over 64 years old) make up 16.3%. In Niederbipp about 69.3% of the population (between age 25-64) have completed either non-mandatory upper secondary education or additional higher education (either university or a Fachhochschule).

Niederbipp has an unemployment rate of 1.79%. As of 2005, there were 255 people employed in the primary economic sector and about 46 businesses involved in this sector. 623 people are employed in the secondary sector and there are 55 businesses in this sector. 853 people are employed in the tertiary sector, with 105 businesses in this sector. The historical population is given in the following table:

year	population
1764	1,041
1850	2,337
1900	2,245
1950	3,050
2000	3,930

== Transport ==
Härkingen respectively Niederbipp are scheduled as one of the eight hubs of the proposed Cargo Sous Terrain, an underground cargo transport system those first phase is planned by the early 2030s.
