= Bannwil =

- Municipality
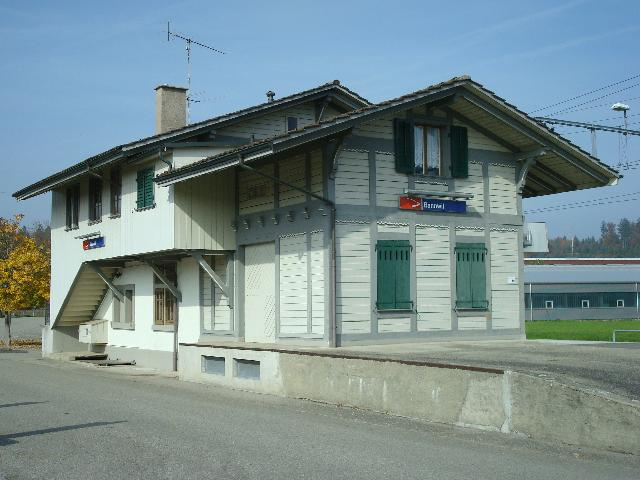
- Historic Bannwil train station

- Flag Coat of arms
- Location of Bannwil
- Location within Switzerland Location within Canton of Bern
- Coordinates: 47°14′N 7°44′E
- Country: Switzerland
- Canton: Bern
- District: Oberaargau

Area
  - Total: 4.8 km^{2} (1.9 sq mi)
- Elevation: 434 m (1,424 ft)

Population (December 2020)
  - Total: 676
  - Density: 140/km^{2} (360/sq mi)
- Time zone: UTC+01:00 (CET)
  - Summer (DST): UTC+02:00 (CEST)
- Postal code: 4913
- SFOS number: 323
- ISO 3166 code: CH-BE
- Surrounded by: Aarwangen, Berken, Graben, Niederbipp, Oberbipp, Schwarzhäusern, Walliswil bei Niederbipp
- Website: www.bannwil.ch

Bannwil is a municipality in the Oberaargau administrative district in the canton of Bern in Switzerland.

== History ==
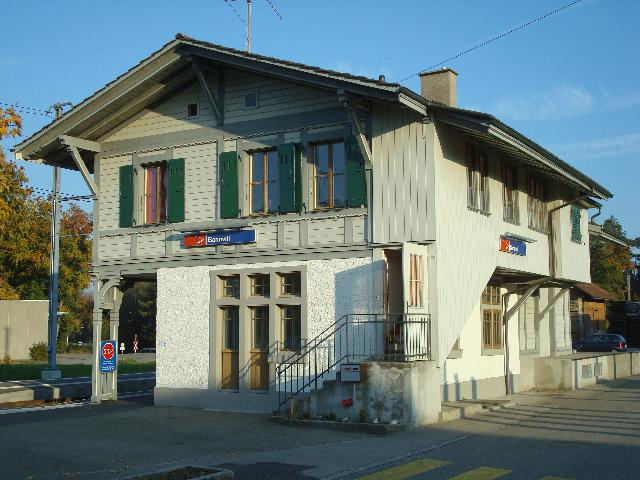
Historic Aare Seeland mobil (ASm) train station in Bannwil from 1907.

Bannwil is first mentioned in 1262 as Benwile.

The area around Bannwil was inhabited during the Hallstatt era and the Early Middle Ages. During the Middle Ages, Bannwil was part of the low court of Aarwangen and the district court of Buchsgau. These two courts began to come under Bernese control in 1432 and by 1463 were completely part of Bern. Over the following centuries, Bannwil alternated between the bailiwicks of Bipp and Aarwangen. Finally in the 17th century it was finally assigned to Aarwangen.

The village church was first mentioned in 1304. The current building was built in 1522 and rebuilt in 1679. In 1320 the church was given by the Count of Frohburg to the monastery of Schöntal. In 1528 control of the church was given to Bern.

In 1904 a hydroelectric power plant opened in Bannwil. It was replaced in 1970 by the Aarekraftwerk-Bannwil hydroelectric power plant. In 1907 the Langenthal-Niederbipp railroad line was built through Bannwil. The railroad opened up the municipality and allowed commuters to live in Bannwil. By 1990, over half of the workers in the municipality commuted to jobs outside it.

== Geography ==
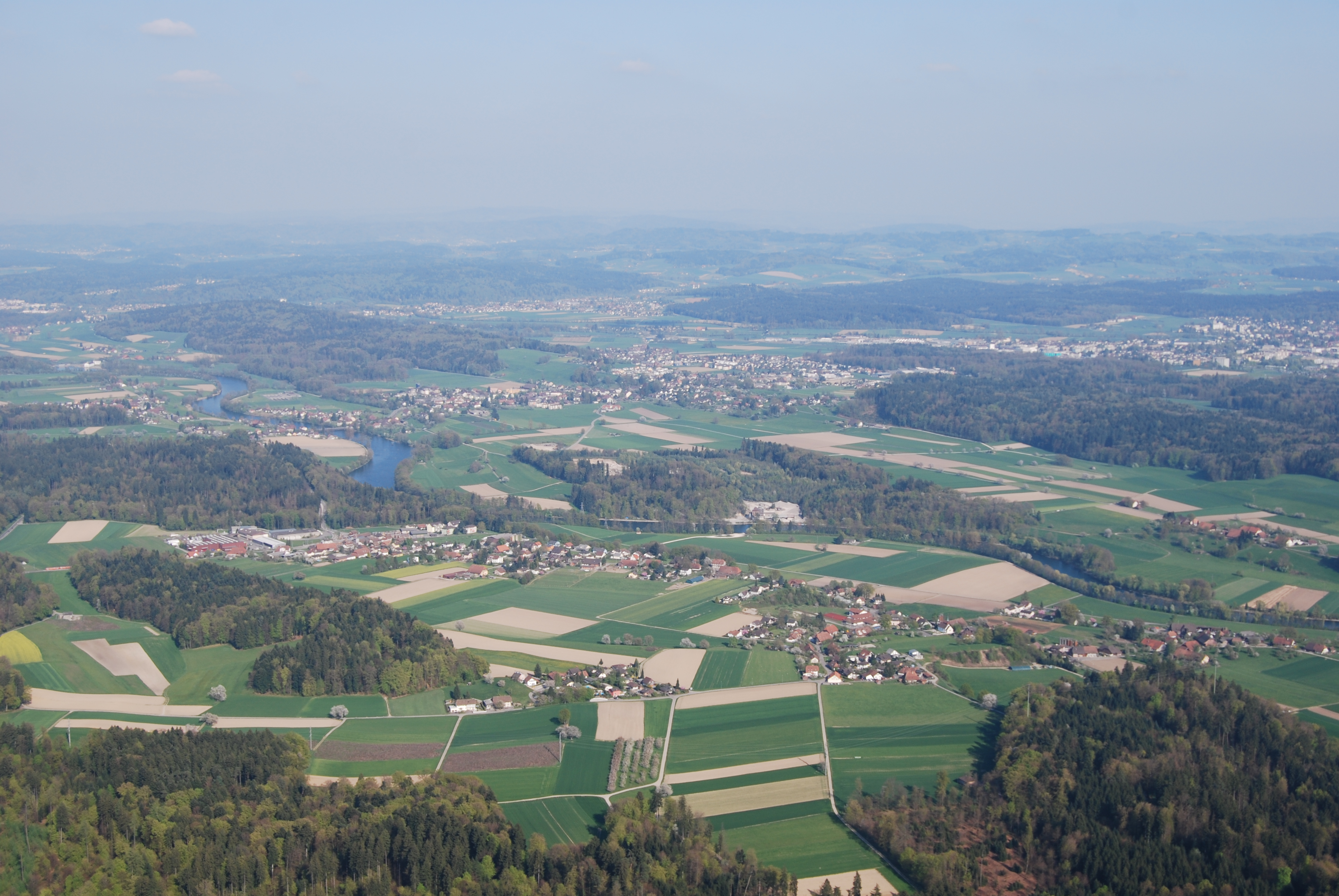
Bannwil

Bannwil has an area of 4.78 km^{2} (1.85 sq mi). Of this area, 2.2 km^{2} (0.85 mi^{2}) or 45.9% is used for agricultural purposes, while 1.88 km^{2} (0.73 mi^{2}) or 39.2% is forested. Of the rest of the land, 0.42 km^{2} (0.16 mi^{2}) or 8.8% is settled (buildings or roads), 0.24 km^{2} (0.093 mi^{2}) or 5.0% is either rivers or lakes and 0.01 km^{2} (2.5 acres) or 0.2% is unproductive land. 3

Aerial view by Walter Mittelholzer (1923)

Of the built up area, housing and buildings made up 4.8% and transportation infrastructure made up 2.3%. Out of the forested land, 37.2% of the total land area is heavily forested and 2.1% is covered with orchards or small clusters of trees. Of the agricultural land, 33.6% is used for growing crops and 10.9% is pastures, while 1.5% is used for orchards or vine crops. All the water in the municipality is flowing water.

The municipality is located on the left bank of the Aare river. It consists of the villages of Bannwil, Stalden, Winkel, Bännli and Hogerrüti.

On 31 December 2009 Amtsbezirk Aarwangen, the municipality's former district, was dissolved. This was followed by the municipality joining Verwaltungskreis Oberaargau on 1 January 2010.

== Coat of arms ==
The blazon of the municipal coat of arms is Gules a Trefoil Vert topped with a Mullet of Five Or.

== Demographics ==
Bannwil has a population (as of December 2020) of 676. As of 2010, 6.7% of the population are resident foreign nationals. Over the last 10 years (2000-2010) the population has changed at a rate of 1.5%. Migration accounted for 2.1%, while births and deaths accounted for 1.5%.

Most of the population (as of 2000) speaks German (615 or 96.5%) as their first language, Serbo-Croatian is the second most common (8 or 1.3%) and Albanian is the third (7 or 1.1%). There are 2 people who speak French, 3 people who speak Italian.

As of 2008, the population was 49.9% male and 50.1% female. The population was made up of 313 Swiss men (46.5% of the population) and 23 (3.4%) non-Swiss men. There were 315 Swiss women (46.8%) and 22 (3.3%) non-Swiss women. Of the population in the municipality, 205 or about 32.2% were born in Bannwil and lived there in 2000. There were 252 or 39.6% who were born in the same canton, while 122 or 19.2% were born somewhere else in Switzerland, and 43 or 6.8% were born outside of Switzerland.

As of 2010, children and teenagers (0–19 years old) make up 21.5% of the population, while adults (20–64 years old) make up 61.2% and seniors (over 64 years old) make up 17.2%.

As of 2000, there were 257 people who were single and never married in the municipality. There were 309 married individuals, 44 widows or widowers and 27 individuals who are divorced.

As of 2000, there were 77 households that consist of only one person and 14 households with five or more people. In 2000, a total of 256 apartments (90.1% of the total) were permanently occupied, while 15 apartments (5.3%) were seasonally occupied and 13 apartments (4.6%) were empty. The vacancy rate for the municipality, in 2011, was 0.31%.

The historical population is given in the following chart:

== Politics ==
In the 2011 federal election the most popular party was the SVP which received 38% of the vote. The next three most popular parties were the BDP Party (18.5%), the SPS (18.2%) and the FDP (7.1%). In the federal election, a total of 231 votes were cast, and the voter turnout was 44.9%.

== Economy ==
As of 2011, Bannwil had an unemployment rate of 1.15%. As of 2008, there were a total of 213 people employed in the municipality. Of these, there were 45 people employed in the primary economic sector and about 15 businesses involved in this sector. 71 people were employed in the secondary sector and there were 10 businesses in this sector. 97 people were employed in the tertiary sector, with 18 businesses in this sector.

In 2008 there were a total of 183 full-time equivalent jobs. The number of jobs in the primary sector was 29, of which 26 were in agriculture and 3 were in forestry or lumber production. The number of jobs in the secondary sector was 66 of which 56 or (84.8%) were in manufacturing and 10 (15.2%) were in construction. The number of jobs in the tertiary sector was 88. In the tertiary sector; 14 or 15.9% were in wholesale or retail sales or the repair of motor vehicles, 42 or 47.7% were in the movement and storage of goods, 5 or 5.7% were in a hotel or restaurant, 3 or 3.4% were in the information industry, 7 or 8.0% were technical professionals or scientists, 4 or 4.5% were in education.

In 2000, there were 36 workers who commuted into the municipality and 235 workers who commuted away. The municipality is a net exporter of workers, with about 6.5 workers leaving the municipality for every one entering. Of the working population, 12% used public transportation to get to work, and 59.8% used a private car. Bannwil railway station is located on the Langenthal-Oensingen line.

== Religion ==
From the 2000 census, 78 or 12.2% were Roman Catholic, while 470 or 73.8% belonged to the Swiss Reformed Church. Of the rest of the population, there were 6 members of an Orthodox church (or about 0.94% of the population), there were 3 individuals (or about 0.47% of the population) who belonged to the Christian Catholic Church, and there were 52 individuals (or about 8.16% of the population) who belonged to another Christian church. There were 14 (or about 2.20% of the population) who were Islamic. There were 4 individuals who were Buddhist. 26 (or about 4.08% of the population) belonged to no church, are agnostic or atheist, and 10 individuals (or about 1.57% of the population) did not answer the question.

== Education ==
In Bannwil about 284 or (44.6%) of the population have completed non-mandatory upper secondary education, and 71 or (11.1%) have completed additional higher education (either university or a Fachhochschule). Of the 71 who completed tertiary schooling, 69.0% were Swiss men, 29.6% were Swiss women.

The Canton of Bern school system provides one year of non-obligatory Kindergarten, followed by six years of Primary school. This is followed by three years of obligatory lower Secondary school where the students are separated according to ability and aptitude. Following the lower Secondary students may attend additional schooling or they may enter an apprenticeship.

During the 2009-10 school year, there were a total of 53 students attending classes in Bannwil. There was one kindergarten class with a total of 14 students in the municipality. Of the kindergarten students, 14.3% were permanent or temporary residents of Switzerland (not citizens) and 14.3% have a different mother language than the classroom language. The municipality had 2 primary classes and 39 students. Of the primary students, 10.3% were permanent or temporary residents of Switzerland (not citizens) and 7.7% have a different mother language than the classroom language.

As of 2000, there were 6 students in Bannwil who came from another municipality, while 29 residents attended schools outside the municipality.
