= Walliswil bei Niederbipp =

- Municipality
- Flag Coat of arms
- Location of Walliswil bei Niederbipp
- Location within Switzerland Location within Canton of Bern
- Coordinates: 47°15′N 7°41′E
- Country: Switzerland
- Canton: Bern
- District: Oberaargau

Area
  - Total: 1.4 km^{2} (0.54 sq mi)
- Elevation: 431 m (1,414 ft)

Population (December 2020)
  - Total: 227
  - Density: 160/km^{2} (420/sq mi)
- Time zone: UTC+01:00 (CET)
  - Summer (DST): UTC+02:00 (CEST)
- Postal code: 3380
- SFOS number: 990
- ISO 3166 code: CH-BE
- Surrounded by: Bannwil, Berken, Oberbipp, Walliswil bei Wangen, Wiedlisbach
- Website: www.walliswil-bipp.ch

Walliswil bei Niederbipp is a municipality in the Oberaargau administrative district in the canton of Bern in Switzerland.

== Geography ==
Walliswil bei Niederbipp has an area of 1.4 km^{2} (0.54 sq mi). Of this area, 53.5% is used for agricultural purposes, while 18.8% is forested. Of the rest of the land, 17.4% is settled (buildings or roads) and the remainder (10.4%) is non-productive (rivers, glaciers or mountains).

== Demographics ==
Walliswil bei Niederbipp has a population (as of 31 December 2020) of 227. As of 2007, 1.3% of the population was made up of foreign nationals. Over the last 10 years the population has grown at a rate of 5.7%. Most of the population (as of 2000) speaks German (99.2%), with English being second most common ( 0.4%) and Russian being third ( 0.4%).

In the 2007 election the most popular party was the SVP which received 47.2% of the vote. The next three most popular parties were the SPS (17.4%), the FDP (11.4%) and the CSP (9.1%).

The age distribution of the population (as of 2000) is children and teenagers (0–19 years old) make up 18% of the population, while adults (20–64 years old) make up 61.9% and seniors (over 64 years old) make up 20.1%. In Walliswil bei Niederbipp about 71.9% of the population (between age 25–64) have completed either non-mandatory upper secondary education or additional higher education (either university or a Fachhochschule).

Walliswil bei Niederbipp has an unemployment rate of 1.86%. As of 2005, there were 13 people employed in the primary economic sector and about 4 businesses involved in this sector. 15 people are employed in the secondary sector and there are 1 business in this sector. 36 people are employed in the tertiary sector, with 5 businesses in this sector.
