= Wangen an der Aare =

- Municipality
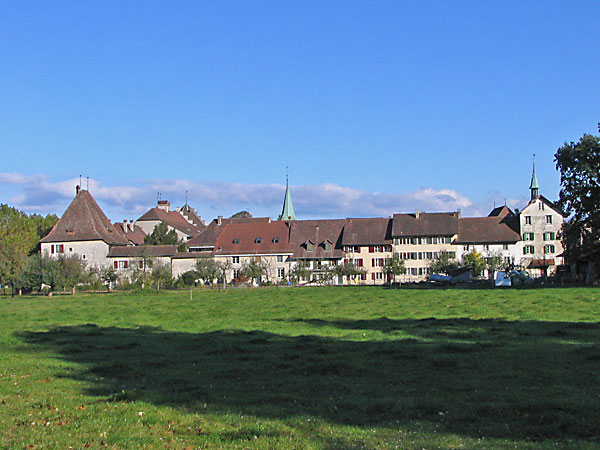

- Flag Coat of arms
- Location of Wangen an der Aare
- Location within Switzerland Location within Canton of Bern
- Coordinates: 47°14′N 7°39′E
- Country: Switzerland
- Canton: Bern
- District: Oberaargau

Area
  - Total: 6.8 km^{2} (2.6 sq mi)
- Elevation: 423 m (1,388 ft)

Population (December 2020)
  - Total: 2,377
  - Density: 350/km^{2} (910/sq mi)
- Time zone: UTC+01:00 (CET)
  - Summer (DST): UTC+02:00 (CEST)
- Postal code: 3380
- SFOS number: 992
- ISO 3166 code: CH-BE
- Surrounded by: Attiswil, Deitingen (SO), Flumenthal (SO), Walliswil bei Wangen, Wangenried, Wiedlisbach
- Website: www.wangen-a-a.ch

Wangen an der Aare is a municipality in the Oberaargau administrative district in the canton of Bern in Switzerland.

On 1 January 2024 the former municipality of Wangenried merged to form the municipality of Wangen an der Aare.

This small town lies between Olten and Solothurn in rural surroundings on the Aare, a major river of the west-central lowland region of Switzerland, the Mittelland. An ancient wooden covered bridge crosses the Aare at this point. Wangen an der Aare was the administrative centre of the former district of the same name.

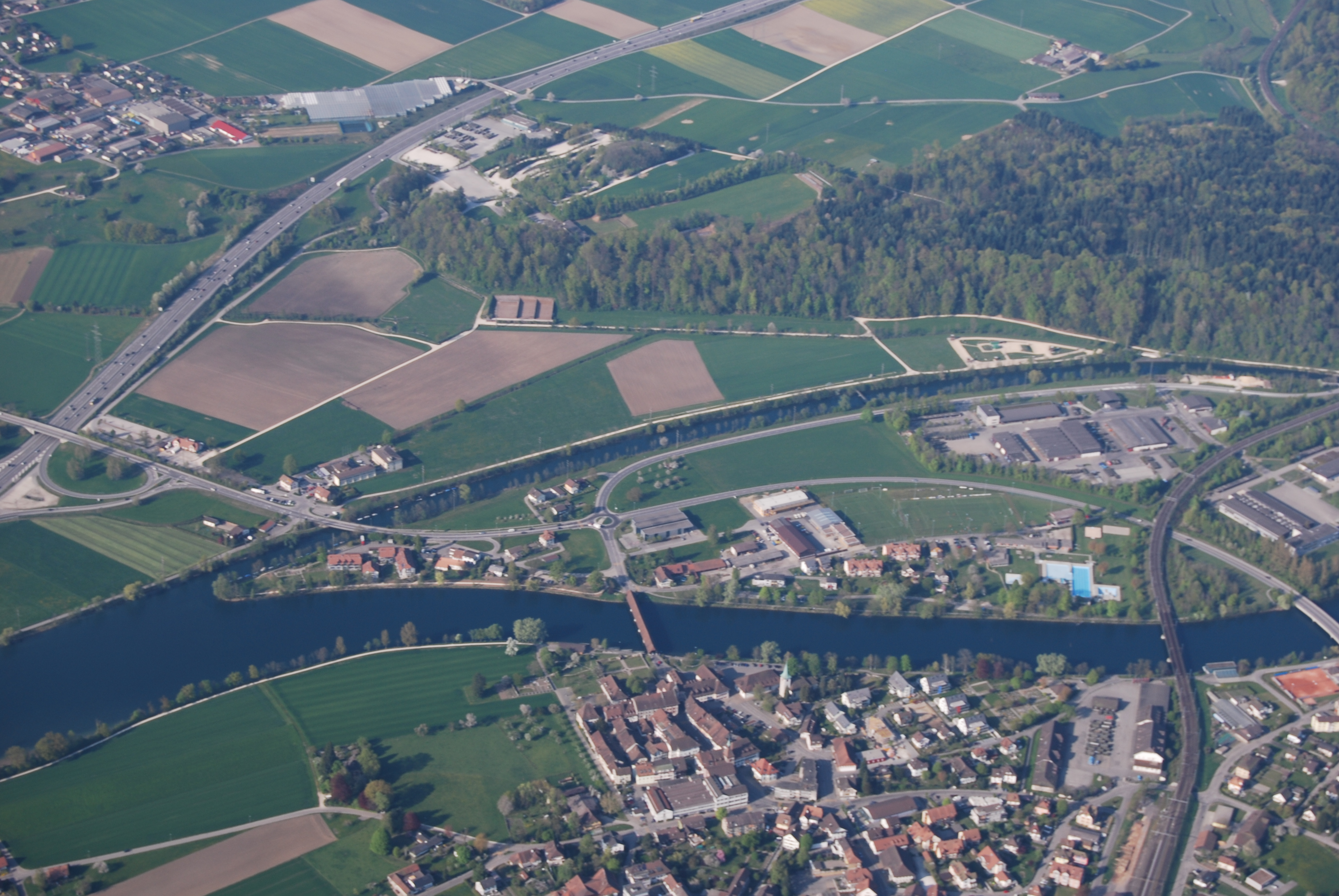
Wangen an der Aare

== Transport links ==
Wangen is situated on the Biel/Bienne - Olten railway line and close to the A1 motorway.

== History ==
Wang(en) means an area at the foot of a slope; in this case the slope in question is almost certainly that of the nearby Jura Mountains. Wangen's coat of arms shows crossed St Peter's keys in blue on a white ground. The nobles (or Vögte) who held the lordship of Wangen adopted this symbol which had been the badge of the Upper Aargau estates of the Abbey of Saint Peter in the Black Forest. The earliest document to be sealed with the crossed-keys symbol dates from the year 1380.

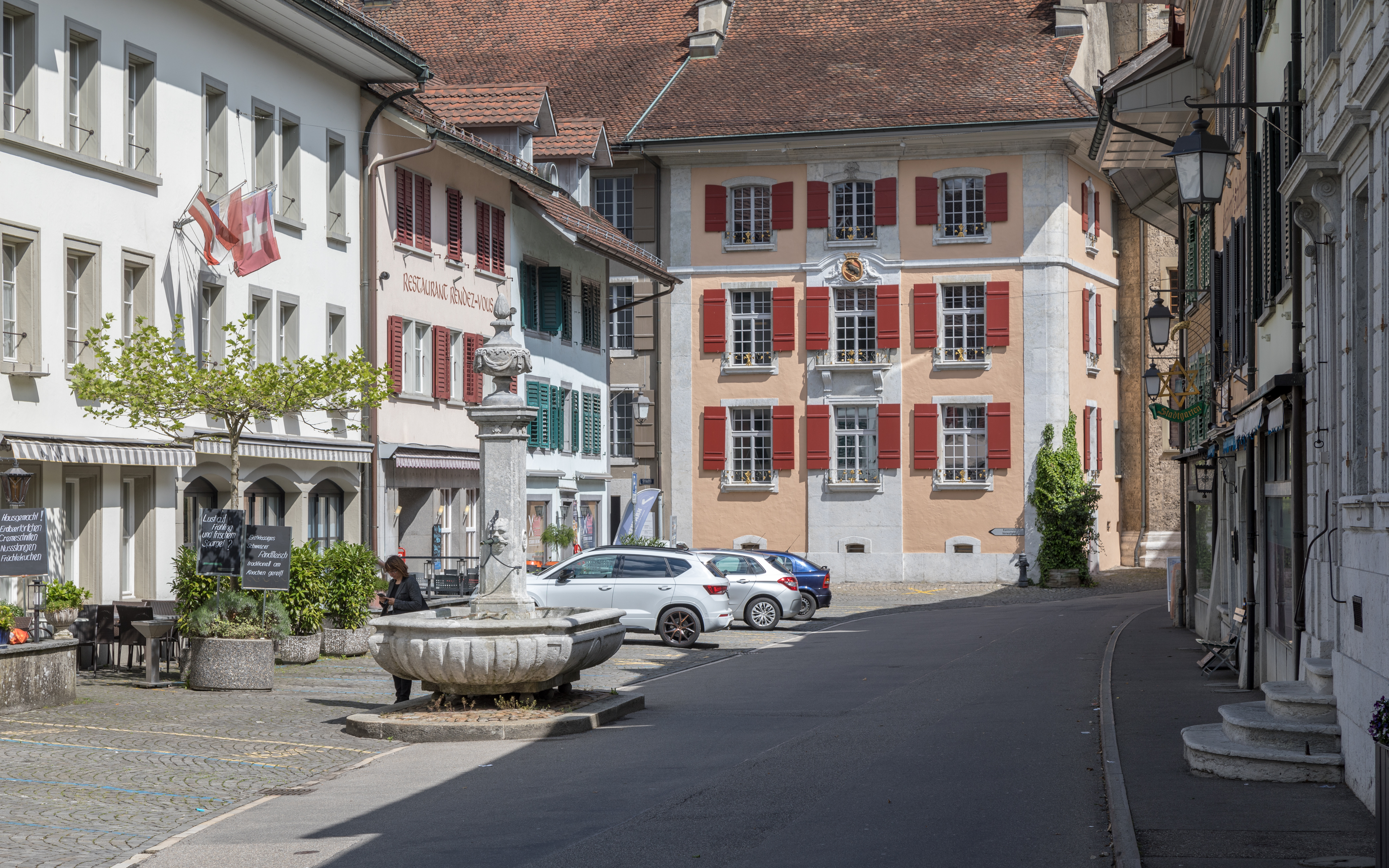
"Städtli" and a part of the castle.

The castle, built by the Kyburger dynasty in 1407, became the seat of the Bernese regional governorship, and some departments of the regional administration are still housed in the building today. The settlement occupied a strategically important spot, guarding the river-crossing and serving as a customs and staging-point for waterway traffic on the Aare. When the latter trade came to an end the little town experienced a serious economic crisis. The salt house of 1775 remains today as a testament to this past.

== Geography ==
Aerial view by Walter Mittelholzer (1932)

Wangen has an area of 5.2 km^{2} (2.0 sq mi). Of this area, 42.8% is used for agricultural purposes, while 28.8% is forested. Of the rest of the land, 20.3% is settled (buildings or roads) and the remainder (8.1%) is non-productive (rivers, glaciers or mountains).

== Demographics ==
Wangen has a population (as of 31 December 2020) of 2,377. As of 2007, 12.5% of the population was made up of foreign nationals. Over the last 10 years the population has grown at a rate of 7.4%. Most of the population (as of 2000) speaks German (91.0%), with Albanian being second most common ( 3.0%) and Serbo-Croatian being third ( 2.4%).

In the 2007 election the most popular party was the SVP which received 39.2% of the vote. The next three most popular parties were the FDP (25.4%), the SPS (15.8%) and the Green Party (6.7%).

The age distribution of the population (as of 2000) is children and teenagers (0–19 years old) make up 24% of the population, while adults (20–64 years old) make up 59.6% and seniors (over 64 years old) make up 16.4%. In Wangen about 75.3% of the population (between age 25-64) have completed either non-mandatory upper secondary education or additional higher education (either university or a Fachhochschule).

Wangen has an unemployment rate of 1.76%. As of 2005, there were 53 people employed in the primary economic sector and about 18 businesses involved in this sector. 240 people are employed in the secondary sector and there are 37 businesses in this sector. 673 people are employed in the tertiary sector, with 107 businesses in this sector.

== Notable people ==
- Arnold Rikli (1823 in Wangen an der Aare – 1906) a Swiss natural healer, he proposed exposing the body to sun and air, called sun tanning

== Army base ==
The modern-day Swiss Army base at Wangen is a link to the town's history as a military centre. The base grew up around the riverside warehouses, where field howitzer units were stationed in World War I. Today Wangen an der Aare is the Transport Corps' main centre and a training-place for disaster relief and rescue units. The Corps of Engineers' bridge-builders, the Pontoniers, also train here.

== Economy ==
The bedware company Roviva Roth & Cie. AG developed from a horsehair spinning-mill first mentioned in 1748.
