= Heimenhausen =

- Municipality
- Flag Coat of arms
- Location of Heimenhausen
- Location within Switzerland Location within Canton of Bern
- Coordinates: 47°12′36″N 7°42′00″E
- Country: Switzerland
- Canton: Bern
- District: Oberaargau

Government
  - Mayor: Verena Schertenleib-Helbling

Area
  - Total: 3.2 km^{2} (1.2 sq mi)
- Elevation: 455 m (1,493 ft)

Population (December 2020)
  - Total: 1,136
  - Density: 360/km^{2} (920/sq mi)
- Time zone: UTC+01:00 (CET)
  - Summer (DST): UTC+02:00 (CEST)
- Postal code: 3373
- SFOS number: 977
- ISO 3166 code: CH-BE
- Surrounded by: Berken, Graben, Herzogenbuchsee, Röthenbach bei Herzogenbuchsee, Walliswil bei Wangen, Wanzwil
- Website: www.heimenhausen.ch

Heimenhausen is a municipality in the Oberaargau administrative district in the canton of Bern in Switzerland.

On January 1, 2009, the municipalities of Wanzwil and Röthenbach bei Herzogenbuchsee became part of the Municipality of Heimenhausen.

== History ==
Heimenhausen is first mentioned in 1356 as Heimenhusen.

== Geography ==
Heimenhausen has an area, as of 2009, of 5.85 km^{2} (2.26 sq mi). Of this area, 3.08 km^{2} (1.19 sq mi) or 52.6% is used for agricultural purposes, while 2.03 km^{2} (0.78 sq mi) or 34.7% is forested. Of the rest of the land, 0.68 km^{2} (0.26 sq mi) or 11.6% is settled (buildings or roads), 0.02 km^{2} (4.9 acres) or 0.3% is either rivers or lakes and 0.02 km^{2} (4.9 acres) or 0.3% is unproductive land.

Of the built up area, housing and buildings made up 6.8% and transportation infrastructure made up 3.2%. Power and water infrastructure as well as other special developed areas made up 1.2% of the area 33.8% of the total land area is heavily forested. Of the agricultural land, 36.1% is used for growing crops and 15.7% is pastures. All the water in the municipality is in rivers and streams.

== Demographics ==
Heimenhausen (alone) has a population (as of 31 December 2020) of 1,136. As of 2007, 3.1% of the population was made up of foreign nationals. Over the last 10 years the population has decreased at a rate of -9.3%. Most of the population (as of 2000) speaks German (98.5%), with Serbo-Croatian being second most common ( 0.7%) and French being third ( 0.2%).

In the 2007 election the most popular party was the SVP which received 50% of the vote. The next three most popular parties were the FDP (14.5%), the SPS (12.1%) and the local small left-wing parties (8.8%).

The age distribution of the population (as of 2000) is children and teenagers (0–19 years old) make up 29.6% of the population, while adults (20–64 years old) make up 55.2% and seniors (over 64 years old) make up 15.2%. About 82% of the population (between age 25-64) have completed either non-mandatory upper secondary education or additional higher education (either university or a Fachhochschule).

Heimenhausen has an unemployment rate of 1.52%. As of 2005, there were 34 people employed in the primary economic sector and about 11 businesses involved in this sector. 2 people are employed in the secondary sector and there are 2 businesses in this sector. 31 people are employed in the tertiary sector, with 6 businesses in this sector. The historical population is given in the following table:

year	population
1764	192
1850	388
1900	416
1950	343
1980	287
2000	453
