= Walliswil bei Wangen =

- Municipality
- Flag Coat of arms
- Location of Walliswil bei Wangen
- Location within Switzerland Location within Canton of Bern
- Coordinates: 47°14′N 7°41′E
- Country: Switzerland
- Canton: Bern
- District: Oberaargau

Area
  - Total: 3.1 km^{2} (1.2 sq mi)
- Elevation: 456 m (1,496 ft)

Population (December 2020)
  - Total: 604
  - Density: 190/km^{2} (500/sq mi)
- Time zone: UTC+01:00 (CET)
  - Summer (DST): UTC+02:00 (CEST)
- Postal code: 3377
- SFOS number: 991
- ISO 3166 code: CH-BE
- Surrounded by: Berken, Heimenhausen, Röthenbach bei Herzogenbuchsee, Walliswil bei Niederbipp, Wangen an der Aare, Wangenried, Wiedlisbach
- Website: www.walliswil.ch

Walliswil bei Wangen is a municipality in the Oberaargau administrative district in the canton of Bern in Switzerland.

== Geography ==
Walliswil bei Wangen has an area of 3.1 km^{2} (1.2 sq mi). Of this area, 51.1% is used for agricultural purposes, while 34.5% is forested. Of the rest of the land, 10.1% is settled (buildings or roads) and the remainder (4.2%) is non-productive (rivers, glaciers or mountains).

== Demographics ==
Walliswil bei Wangen has a population (as of 31 December 2020) of 604. As of 2007, 2.6% of the population was made up of foreign nationals. Over the last 10 years the population has grown at a rate of 3.2%. Most of the population (as of 2000) speaks German (98.7%), with French being second most common ( 0.5%) and Albanian being third ( 0.4%).

In the 2007 election the most popular party was the SVP which received 47.6% of the vote. The next three most popular parties were the SPS (20.6%), the FDP (10%) and the Green Party (6.8%).

The age distribution of the population (as of 2000) is children and teenagers (0–19 years old) make up 20.7% of the population, while adults (20–64 years old) make up 61.5% and seniors (over 64 years old) make up 17.8%. In Walliswil bei Wangen about 77.2% of the population (between age 25-64) have completed either non-mandatory upper secondary education or additional higher education (either university or a Fachhochschule).

Walliswil bei Wangen has an unemployment rate of 2.28%. As of 2005, there were 26 people employed in the primary economic sector and about 10 businesses involved in this sector. 18 people are employed in the secondary sector and there are 8 businesses in this sector. 58 people are employed in the tertiary sector, with 11 businesses in this sector.
