= Lives of Flemish, German, and Dutch painters =

Compilation of artist biographies by Jean-Baptiste Descamps

The Lives of Flemish, German, and Dutch painters refers to a compilation of artist biographies by Jean-Baptiste Descamps published in the mid 18th-century that were accompanied by illustrations by Charles Eisen. The list of illustrations follows and is in page order by volume. Most of the biographies were translated into French from earlier work by Karel van Mander and Arnold Houbraken. The illustrated portraits were mostly based on engravings by Jan Meyssens for Het Gulden Cabinet and by Arnold and Jacobus Houbraken for their Schouburgh, while the work examples engraved in the margins of the portraits were mostly based on engravings by Jacob Campo Weyerman.

Image	Name	Publication	Page
	Jan van Eyck	Tome Premier, 1753	1
	Quentin Metsys the Younger	Tome Premier, 1753	17
	Bernard van Orley	Tome Premier, 1753	38
	Jan van Scorel	Tome Premier, 1753	50
	Maarten van Heemskerck	Tome Premier, 1753	60
	Ambrosius Holbein	Tome Premier, 1753	71
	Jan Mabuse	Tome Premier, 1753	83
	Pieter Brueghel the Younger	Tome Premier, 1753	101
	Frans Floris	Tome Premier, 1753	111
	Marten de Vos	Tome Premier, 1753	117
	Hubert Goltzius	Tome Premier, 1753	128
	Bartholomeus Spranger	Tome Premier, 1753	184
	Karel van Mander	Tome Premier, 1753	194
	Wenceslas Cobergher	Tome Premier, 1753	205
	Otto van Veen	Tome Premier, 1753	223
	Adam van Noort	Tome Premier, 1753	228
	Hendrik Goltzius	Tome Premier, 1753	230
	Hendrick van Balen	Tome Premier, 1753	237
	Abraham Bloemaert	Tome Premier, 1753	246
	Michiel Jansz. van Mierevelt	Tome Premier, 1753	256
	Adam Elsheimer	Tome Premier, 1753	283
	Roelant Savery	Tome Premier, 1753	293
	Peter Paul Rubens	Tome Premier, 1753	297
	Frans Snyders	Tome Premier, 1753	330
	Jan Wildens	Tome Premier, 1753	336
	Jan Antonisz. van Ravesteyn	Tome Premier, 1753	341
	Caspar de Crayer	Tome Premier, 1753	350
	Frans Hals	Tome Premier, 1753	360
	Cornelius van Poelenburgh	Tome Premier, 1753	365
	Jan Brueghel the Elder	Tome Premier, 1753	376
	Johannes van der Beeck	Tome Premier, 1753	382
	Hendrik van Steenwijk II	Tome Premier, 1753	384
	Daniel Seghers	Tome Premier, 1753	391
	Cornelis Schut	Tome Premier, 1753	398
	Wybrand de Geest	Tome Premier, 1753	402
	Lucas van Uden	Tome Premier, 1753	408
	Dirk van Hoogstraten	Tome Premier, 1753	411
	Leonaert Bramer	Tome Premier, 1753	416
	Jan van Goyen	Tome Premier, 1753	419
	Theodoor Rombouts	Tome Premier, 1753	425
	Jacob Jordaens	Tome Second, 1754	1
	Anthony van Dyck	Tome Second, 1754	8
	Jan Davidsz. de Heem	Tome Second, 1754	37
	Philippe de Champaigne	Tome Second, 1754	62
	Simon Peter Tilemann	Tome Second, 1754	69
	Johannes van Bronckhorst	Tome Second, 1754	72
	Pieter Jansz van Asch	Tome Second, 1754	76
	Rembrandt	Tome Second, 1754	84
	Erasmus Quellinus II	Tome Second, 1754	108
	Jan Lievens	Tome Second, 1754	117
	Anna Maria van Schurman	Tome Second, 1754	121
	Gerard ter Borch	Tome Second, 1754	125
	Adriaen Brouwer	Tome Second, 1754	131
	Joos van Craesbeeck	Tome Second, 1754	140
	Jacob Adriaensz Backer	Tome Second, 1754	143
	Herman Saftleven	Tome Second, 1754	148
	David Teniers the Younger	Tome Second, 1754	155
	Adriaen van Ostade	Tome Second, 1754	175
	Adriaen Hanneman	Tome Second, 1754	188
	Cornelis Saftleven	Tome Second, 1754	197
	Bartholomeus van der Helst	Tome Second, 1754	201
	Otto Marseus van Schrieck	Tome Second, 1754	205
	Pieter van Laer	Tome Second, 1754	207
	Nicolaes de Helt Stockade	Tome Second, 1754	213
	Gerrit Dou	Tome Second, 1754	218
	David Ryckaert III	Tome Second, 1754	235
	Gabriël Metsu	Tome Second, 1754	241
	Govert Flinck	Tome Second, 1754	248
	Peter Lely	Tome Second, 1754	258
	Gonzales Coques	Tome Second, 1754	264
	Jan Philips van Thielen	Tome Second, 1754	271
	Jürgen Ovens	Tome Second, 1754	281
	Cornelis Pietersz Bega	Tome Second, 1754	285
	Philips Wouwerman	Tome Second, 1754	288
	Jan Baptist Weenix	Tome Second, 1754	308
	David Beck	Tome Second, 1754	315
	Adam Pynacker	Tome Second, 1754	319
	Allaert van Everdingen	Tome Second, 1754	321
	Hendrik Martenszoon Sorgh	Tome Second, 1754	324
	Gerbrand van den Eeckhout	Tome Second, 1754	328
	Wallerant Vaillant	Tome Second, 1754	332
	Jacob van der Does	Tome Second, 1754	335
	Paulus Potter	Tome Second, 1754	353
	Johannes Lingelbach	Tome Second, 1754	374
	Jan Vaillant	Tome Second, 1754	382
	Samuel Dirksz van Hoogstraten	Tome Second, 1754	385
	Hendrik Verschuring	Tome Second, 1754	396
	Jacques Vaillant (painter)	Tome Second, 1754	407
	Jan van Hoogstraten	Tome Second, 1754	409
	Vincent van der Vinne	Tome Second, 1754	419
	Willem Kalf	Tome Second, 1754	433
	Johann Heinrich Roos	Tome Second, 1754	439
	Ludolf Bakhuizen	Tome Second, 1754	444
	Adam Frans van der Meulen	Tome Troisieme, 1760	1
	Frans van Mieris the Elder	Tome Troisieme, 1760	13
	Jan Steen	Tome Troisieme, 1760	26
	Melchior d'Hondecoeter	Tome Troisieme, 1760	44
	Heiman Dullaart	Tome Troisieme, 1760	47
	Jacob van Oost	Tome Troisieme, 1760	55
	Joseph Werner	Tome Troisieme, 1760	61
	Adriaen van de Velde	Tome Troisieme, 1760	72
	Caspar Netscher	Tome Troisieme, 1760	78
	Jean Rudolf Werdmuller	Tome Troisieme, 1760	85
	Abraham Genoels	Tome Troisieme, 1760	92
	Gerard de Lairesse	Tome Troisieme, 1760	101
	Karel Dujardin	Tome Troisieme, 1760	111
	Jacob Toorenvliet	Tome Troisieme, 1760	121
	Arnould de Vuez	Tome Troisieme, 1760	125
	Godfried Schalcken	Tome Troisieme, 1760	139
	Jan Weenix	Tome Troisieme, 1760	165
	Robbert Duval (1639–1732)	Tome Troisieme, 1760	172
	Johannes Dünz	Tome Troisieme, 1760	175
	Michiel van Musscher	Tome Troisieme, 1760	181
	Jan de Bisschop	Tome Troisieme, 1760	184
	Maria Sibylla Merian	Tome Troisieme, 1760	200
	Johannes Voorhout	Tome Troisieme, 1760	207
	David van der Plas	Tome Troisieme, 1760	213
	Matthijs Wulfraet	Tome Troisieme, 1760	218
	Godfrey Kneller	Tome Troisieme, 1760	225
	Gerard Hoet	Tome Troisieme, 1760	232
	Cornelis Huysmans	Tome Troisieme, 1760	241
	Augustinus Terwesten	Tome Troisieme, 1760	245
	Johannes Vollevens	Tome Troisieme, 1760	251
	Jan Verkolje	Tome Troisieme, 1760	259
	Joanna Koerten	Tome Troisieme, 1760	273
	Abraham Hondius	Tome Troisieme, 1760	280
	Pieter Eyckens	Tome Troisieme, 1760	286
	Cornelis de Bruijn	Tome Troisieme, 1760	297
	Richard van Orley	Tome Troisieme, 1760	300
	Felix Meyer	Tome Troisieme, 1760	307
	Philipp Peter Roos	Tome Troisieme, 1760	319
	Carel de Moor	Tome Troisieme, 1760	328
	Willem Cornelisz Duyster	Tome Troisieme, 1760	336
	Philip Tideman	Tome Troisieme, 1760	369
	Mathieu Elias	Tome Troisieme, 1760	377
	Adriaen van der Werff	Tome Troisieme, 1760	383
	Arnold Houbraken	Tome Quatrieme, 1764	1
	Bonaventura van Overbeek	Tome Quatrieme, 1764	7
	Johannes Brandenberg	Tome Quatrieme, 1764	23
	Gregor Brandmüller	Tome Quatrieme, 1764	31
	Theodorus Netscher	Tome Quatrieme, 1764	38
	Willem van Mieris	Tome Quatrieme, 1764	45
	Rachel Ruysch	Tome Quatrieme, 1764	65
	Georg Philipp Rugendas	Tome Quatrieme, 1764	78
	Juriaen Pool	Tome Quatrieme, 1764	90
	Jan Kupecký	Tome Quatrieme, 1764	95
	Elias van Nijmegen	Tome Quatrieme, 1764	111
	Jacques-Antoine Arlaud	Tome Quatrieme, 1764	116
	Johann Rudolf Huber	Tome Quatrieme, 1764	125
	Theodor van Pee	Tome Quatrieme, 1764	134
	Arnold Boonen	Tome Quatrieme, 1764	137
	Mattheus Terwesten	Tome Quatrieme, 1764	144
	Isaac de Moucheron	Tome Quatrieme, 1764	153
	Carel Borchaert Voet	Tome Quatrieme, 1764	158
	Nikolaas Verkolje	Tome Quatrieme, 1764	168
	Coenraet Roepel	Tome Quatrieme, 1764	197
	Anna Waser	Tome Quatrieme, 1764	202
	Jacob Campo Weyerman	Tome Quatrieme, 1764	209
	Jacob Appel (painter)	Tome Quatrieme, 1764	219
	Jan van Huysum	Tome Quatrieme, 1764	228
	Segres-Jacques van Helmont	Tome Quatrieme, 1764	236
	Herman van der Mijn	Tome Quatrieme, 1764	245
	Balthasar Denner	Tome Quatrieme, 1764	253
	Jacques Ignatius de Roore	Tome Quatrieme, 1764	262
	Gerard Melder	Tome Quatrieme, 1764	280
	Jacob de Wit	Tome Quatrieme, 1764	283
	Cornelis Troost	Tome Quatrieme, 1764	291

== Sources ==
- 1753: La Vie des Peintres Flamands, Allemands et Hollandois, avec des portraits gravés en Taille-douce, une indication de leurs principaux Ouvrages, & des réflexions sur leurs différentes manieres, M J.B. Descamps, Peintre, Membre l'Académie Royale des Science, Belle-Lettres, & Art de Rouen, & Professeur de l'Ecole du Dessein de la méme Ville, Tome Premier, A Paris, chez Charles-Antoine Jombert, Libraire du Roi pour l'Artillerie & le Génie, rue Dauphine, à l'Image de Notre-Dame, M D CC LIII, Avec Approbation et Privilege du Roi
- 1754: La Vie des Peintres Flamands, Allemands et Hollandois, avec des portraits gravés en Taille-douce, une indication de leurs principaux Ouvrages, & des réflexions sur leurs différentes manieres, M J.B. Descamps, Peintre, Membre l'Académie Royale des Science, Belle-Lettres, & Art de Rouen, & Professeur de l'Ecole du Dessein de la méme Ville, Tome Second, A Paris, chez Charles-Antoine Jombert, Libraire du Roi pour l'Artillerie & le Génie, rue Dauphine, à l'Image de Notre-Dame, M D CC LIV, Avec Approbation et Privilege du Roi
- 1760: La Vie des Peintres Flamands, Allemands et Hollandois, avec des portraits gravés en Taille-douce, une indication de leurs principaux Ouvrages, & des réflexions sur leurs différentes manieres, Par M J.B. Descamps, Peintre, Membre l'Académie Impériale Franciscienne, de celle des Sciences, Belle-Lettres, & Art de Rouen, & Professeur de l'Ecole du Dessein de la méme Ville, Tome Troisieme, A Paris, chez Desaint & Saillant, rue de S. Jean de Beauvais, Pissot, Quai de Conty, Durand, rue de Foin, M D C LX, Avec Approbation et Privilege du Roi
- 1764: La Vie des Peintres Flamands, Allemands et Hollandois, avec des portraits gravés en Taille-douce, une indication de leurs principaux Ouvrages, & des réflexions sur leurs différentes manieres, Par M J.B. Descamps, Peintre, Membre l'Académie Impériale Franciscienne, de celle des Sciences, Belle-Lettres, & Art de Rouen, & Professeur de l'Ecole du Dessein de la méme Ville, Tome Quatrieme, A Paris, chez Desaint & Saillant, rue de S. Jean de Beauvais, Pissot, Quai de Conty, Durand, le Neveu, rue S. Jacques, au coin de la rue du Platre, M D CC LXIV, Avec Approbation et Privilege du Roi
