= Thunstetten Commandery =

The Thunstetten Commandery was a medieval monastery of the Knights Hospitaller in the Swiss municipality of Thunstetten in the Canton of Bern. Today the lands house Thunstetten Castle, which is a national landmark of Switzerland.

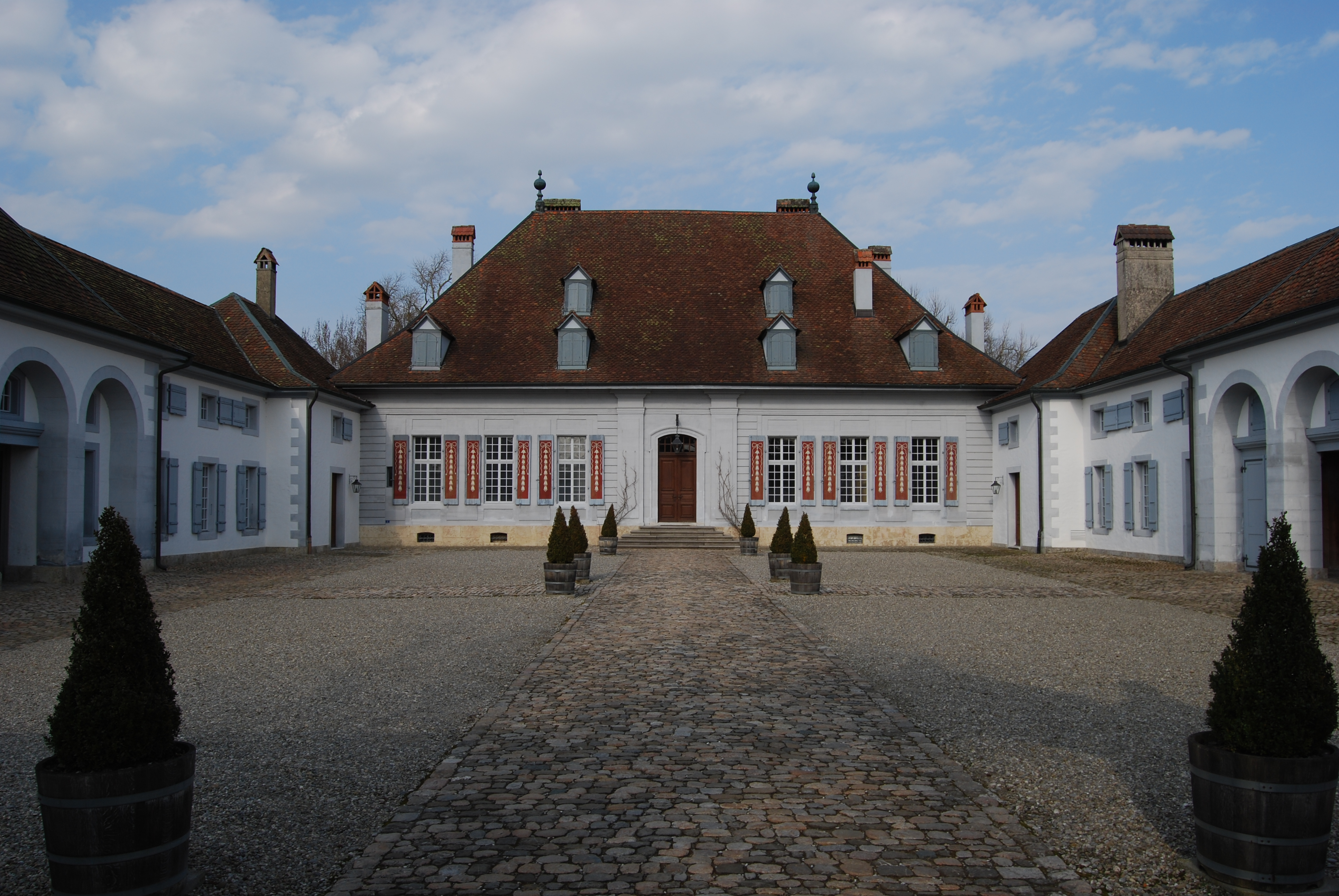
Courtyard of Thunstetten Castle
