= Diepraam =

Diepraam is a surname. Notable people with the surname include:

- Abraham Diepraam (1622–1670), Dutch painter
- Keith Diepraam (born 1942), South African tennis player
