= Jan Gabrielsz Sonjé =

Dutch painter

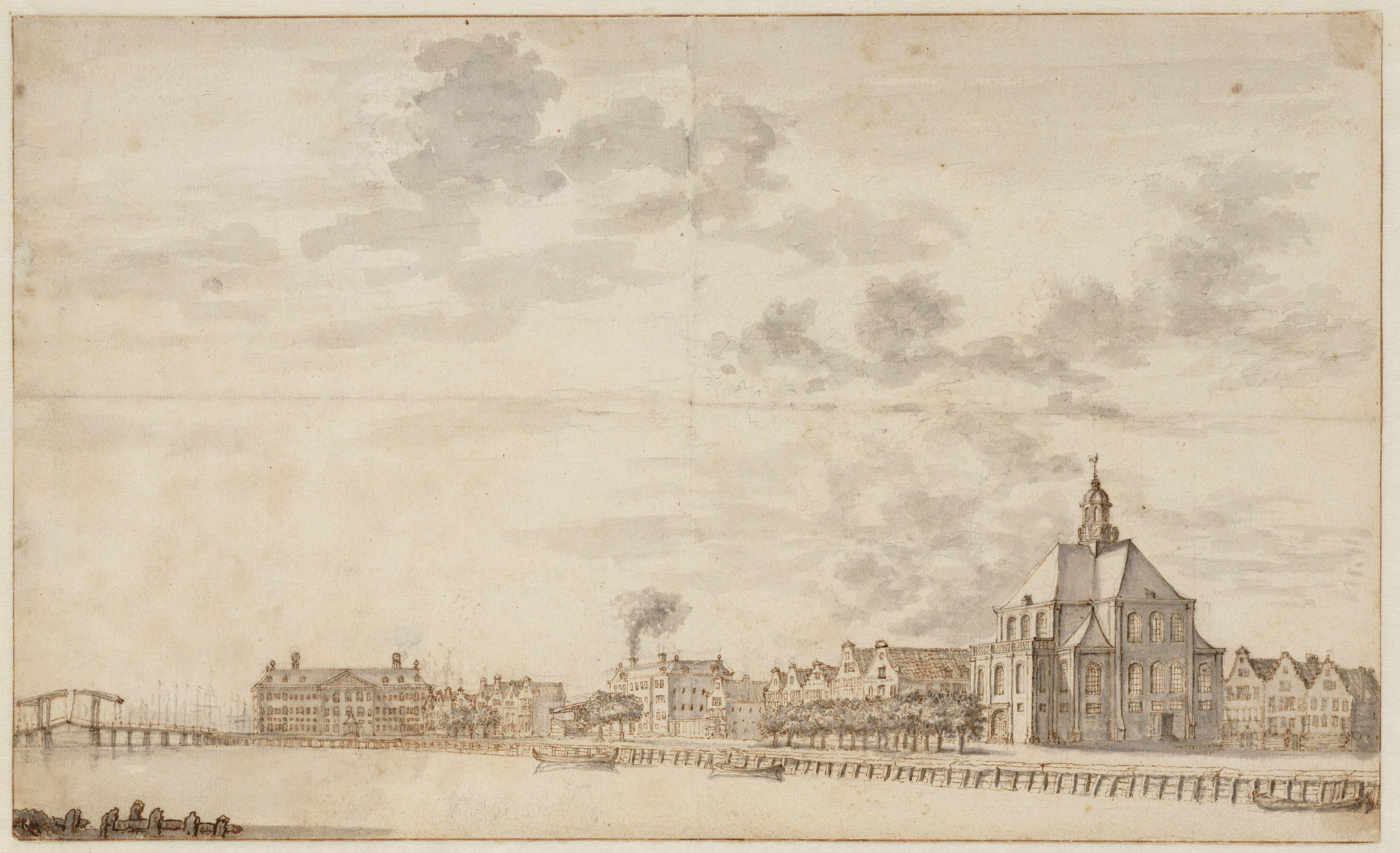
Amsterdam in the 1680s with the Oosterkerk and the Zeemagazijn

Jan Gabrielsz. Sonjé (1625, Delft – 1707, Rotterdam), was a Dutch Golden Age landscape painter.

== Biography ==
According to the RKD he was a pupil of Adam Pijnacker. He became a member of the Delft Guild of St. Luke in 1646, but moved some time after that to Rotterdam, where he was headman of the Rotterdam guild in 1678, 1686 and 1692. He is known for Italianate landscapes and influenced the painters Gerrit Maes and Pieter van Asch. Gerrit's brother Pieter van Mase sometimes painted figures in his landscapes.
