= Margaretha Wulfraet =

Dutch artist (1678–1760)

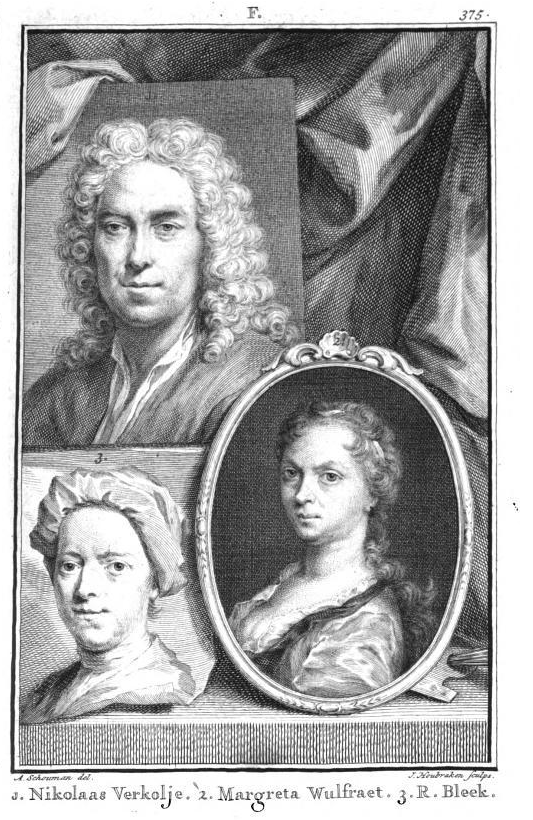
Portrait of Margreta Wulfraet (right) in Jan van Gool's "Nieuw Schouburg", 1750

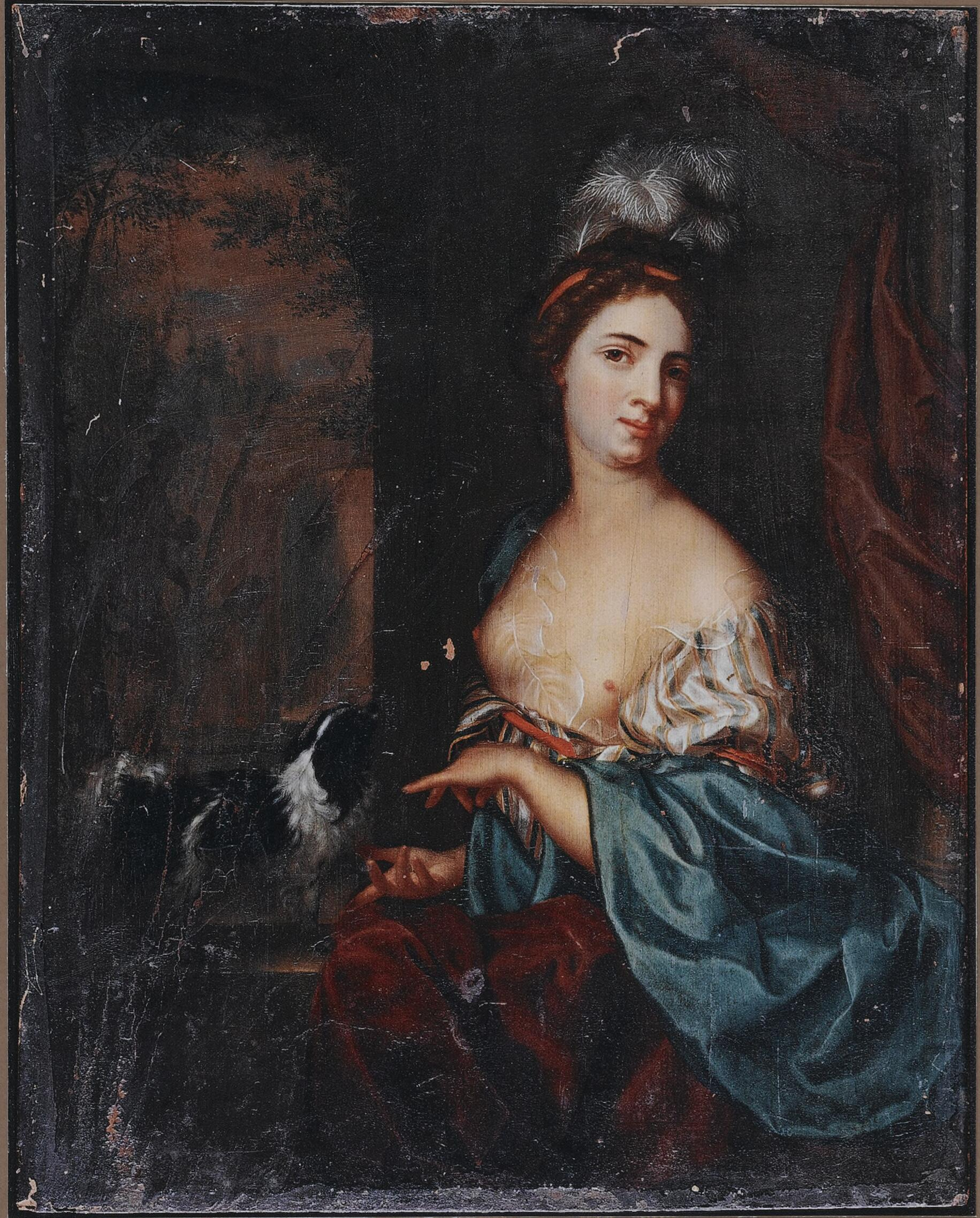
Portrait of a courtesan with a lapdog

Margaretha Wulfraet (1678–1760) was an 18th-century painter from the Dutch Republic.

== Biography ==
Wulfraet was born and died in Arnhem. According to Houbraken she was the daughter of Matthijs Wulfraet who travelled to Frankfurt and became a respected portrait painter, painting many visiting dignitaries and important citizens. He reached a great age, and was able to teach his daughter Margaret his art, which she performed well. Houbraken was planning on devoting a page to her memory, but he never got around to it, since he died before he reached her birth year in his three-volume work on biographical sketches of painters of the Netherlands. Her biography was included in Jan van Gool's sequel, accompanied by a portrait based on a drawing of one of her self-portraits sent to him by Gerard Melder. She was popular in Amsterdam and according to Van Gool, Bernard Picart said of her "C'est un protige, elle fait l'honneur de son sexe." (She is a prodigy and an honor to her sex). In 1741 she returned to Arnhem to live out her days.

According to the RKD she learned to paint from her father Mathijs and moved to Amsterdam with him in 1681. She was influenced by Caspar Netscher and is known for portraits, landscapes, and genre works (though no landscapes by her are known today, these were recorded in her workshop in the inventory made upon her death).
