= Johannes Brandenberg =

Swiss painter (1661–1729)

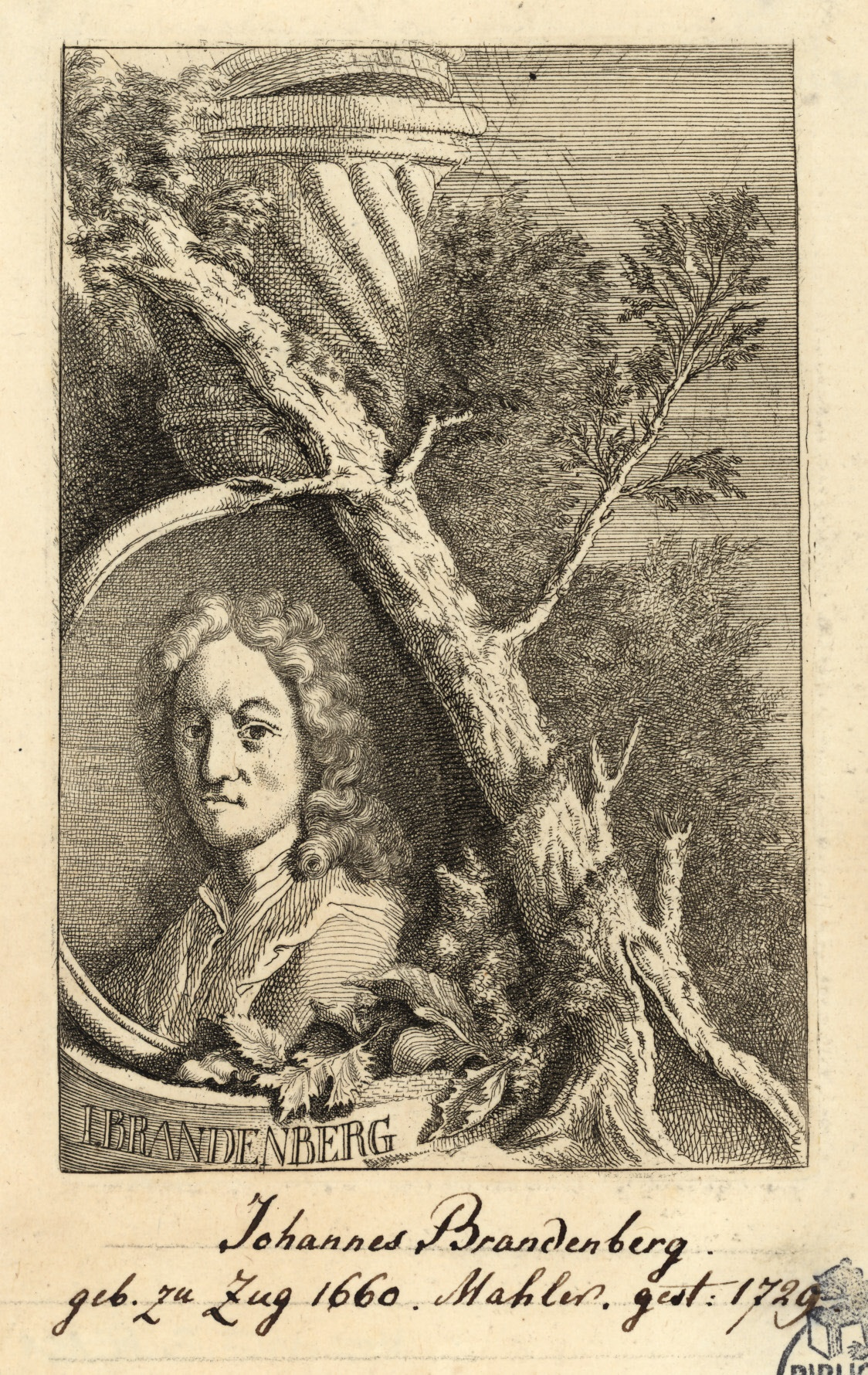
- Portrait of Johannes Brandenberg
- Born: 20 May 1661; Zug, Switzerland
- Died: 26 September 1729 (aged 68); Zug, Switzerland
- Known for: Painting, drawing, ceiling painting, wall painting
- Notable work: Ceiling paintings at Einsiedeln Abbey; works for Beromünster, Pfäfers Abbey and Thunstetten Castle

Johannes Brandenberg (20 May 1661 – 26 September 1729) was a Swiss painter. Active mainly in central Switzerland, he worked for churches, abbeys and castles, producing religious paintings, portraits and large-scale decorative works.

== Biography ==
Johannes Brandenberg was born in Zug on 20 May 1661. He was the son of Thomas Brandenberg, a painter and tailor, and first trained with his father. In 1680, he joined the painters’ confraternity of St Luke in Zug and later travelled for further training, including to Innsbruck and Mantua. In 1683, he married Maria Katharina Kloter and settled in Zug.

Brandenberg worked as a painter at Einsiedeln Abbey from 1682 to 1686 and again from 1711 to 1718. During the 1690s, he received commissions for the Benedictine abbeys of Fischingen and Pfäfers and for the collegiate foundation at Beromünster. During the Second War of Villmergen, he served as commander of St Andreas Castle in Cham. From 1725 to 1729, he served on the board of the Zug confraternity of St Luke. He died in Zug on 26 September 1729.

== Works ==
Brandenberg’s work included religious and allegorical paintings, altarpieces, ceiling paintings, portraits and drawings. Most of his works were in central Switzerland. His portraits included members of Zug’s upper class. He worked repeatedly for Einsiedeln Abbey between 1682 and 1718, producing ceiling paintings for the confession chapel, paintings for the refectory, and ceiling and wall paintings for the abbot’s chapel.

By the 1690s, he was producing side-altarpieces for the collegiate church at Beromünster and altar paintings for Pfäfers Abbey. Other documented works included the high altar for the monastery church of St Klara in Stans, facade paintings at the Brandenberg House in Zug and the town hall in Aarau, and ceiling paintings for the Liebfrauenkirche in Zug and the music hall at the Fraumünster in Zürich. Large-format ceiling paintings became a significant part of his work in the early 18th century, with examples at Einsiedeln Abbey and Thunstetten Castle. His work at Thunstetten also included two battle scenes.
