= Andries Vaillant =

Dutch painter (1655–1693)

Andries Vaillant (1655 in Amsterdam – 1693 in Berlin) was a Dutch Golden Age engraver and artist.

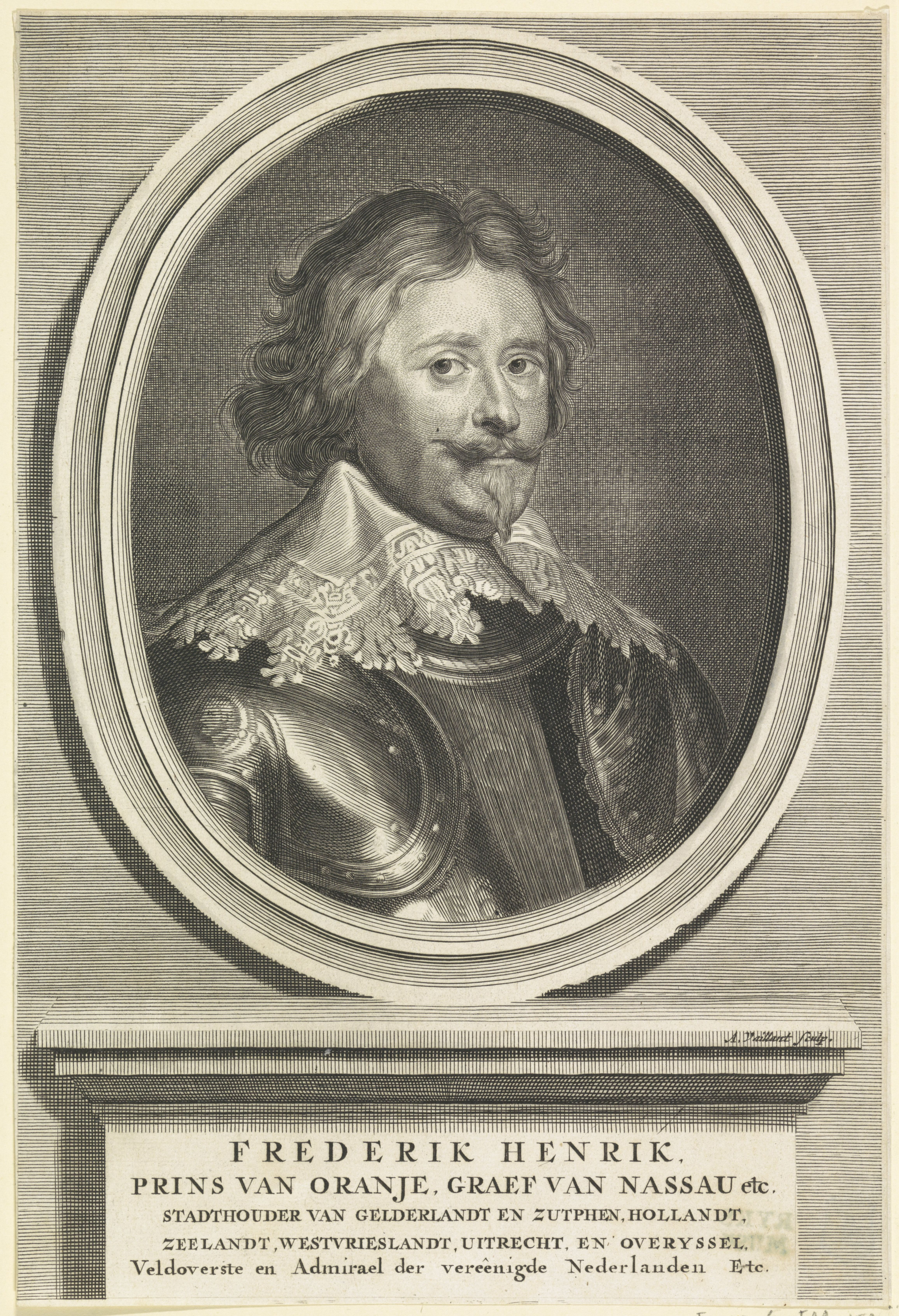
Portrait of Frederick Henry, Prince of Orange by Andries Vaillant between circa 1675 and circa 1693. Engraving after oilpainting by Sir Anthony van Dyck.

According to Houbraken he learned to draw from his oldest brother Wallerant Vaillant and then travelled to Paris to learn engraving. From there he travelled to Berlin to visit his brother Jacques, where he died young.

According to the RKD he was the younger half-brother of the painter Wallerant Vaillant. He travelled between Amsterdam, Paris, and Frankenthal in the years 1675–1678. Then he married Eva Hoen in Sloten in 1678 and settled in Amsterdam. He moved to Berlin in 1685 and is known for paintings as well as engravings.
