= Charles-Antoine Jombert =

French bookseller & publisher (1712–1784)

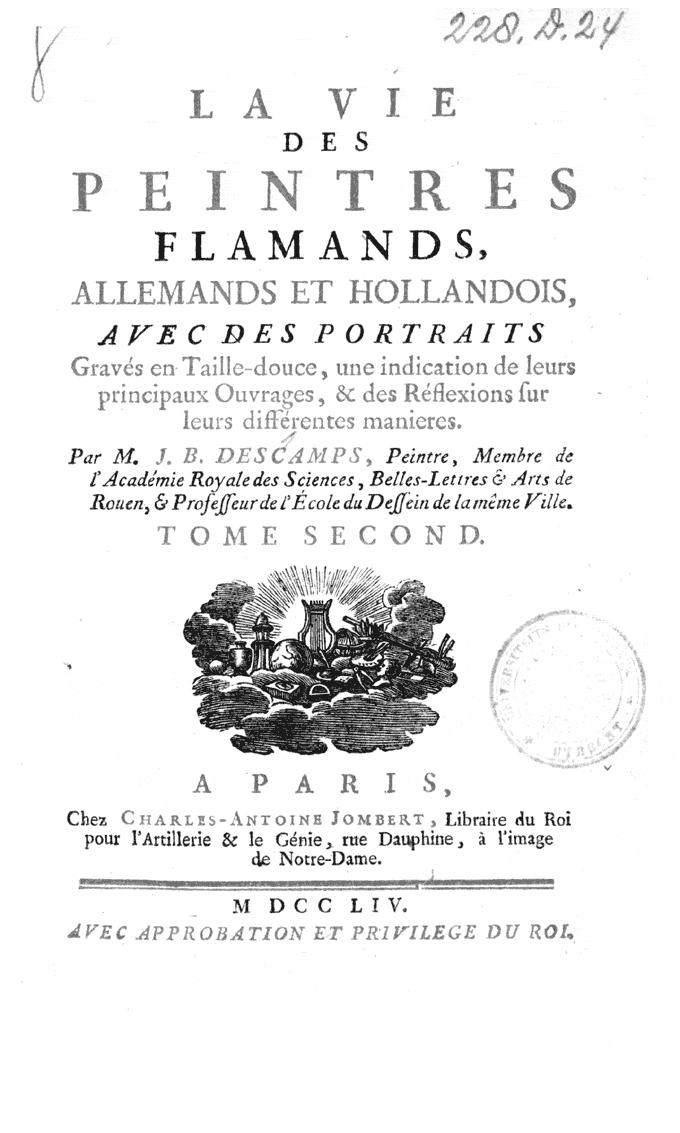
Book II of La Vie des Peintres Flamands, Allemands et Hollandois, published by Charles-Antoine Jombert in 1754

Charles-Antoine Jombert (14 March 1712, Paris – 30 July 1784, Saint-Germain-en-Laye) was a French bookseller and publisher.

== Biography ==
Charles-Antoine Jombert was born 1712 in Paris.

Jombert belonged to a dynasty of booksellers. He became a bookseller when his father, Claude, who had been a bookseller since 1700, died in 1735.

Charles-Antoine Jombert specialised exclusively in military works and was royal bookseller to the artillery and the Royal Engineers. Later he bought much of Pierre-Jean Mariette's collection of prints and books, published an edition of the Fables of Jean de La Fontaine, and traded with all of Europe.

He died 1784 in Saint-Germain-en-Laye.

== Texts ==
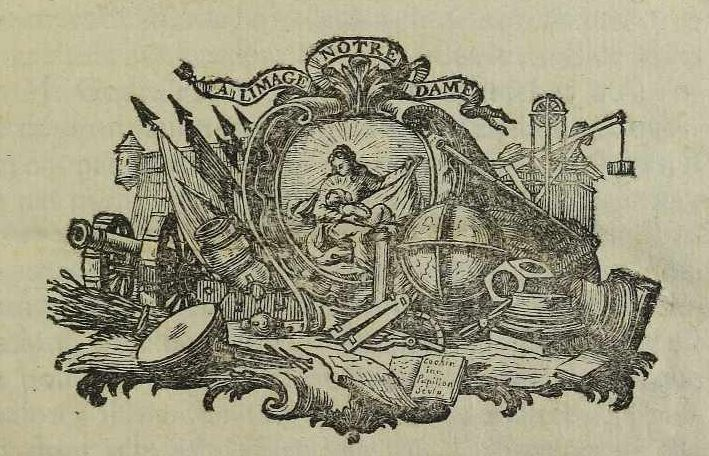
Jombert's mark (from BEIC)

- 1774. Charles-Antoine Jombert. Catalogue raisonné de l'oeuvre de Sébastien Le Clerc, Dessinateur & graveur du Cabinet du Roi. Disposé par ordre historique, suivant l'année où chaque pièce a été gravée, depuis 1650 jusqu'en 1714. Avec la vie de ce célèbre artiste. Paris, Rue Dauphine chez l'auteur.
- 1764. Charles-Antoine Jombert. Architecture moderne, ou l'art de bien bâtir pour toutes sortes de personnes. Divisée en six livres. Paris: chez l'Auteur.
- 1766. Fréart de Chambray, Roland, Errard, Charles e Jombert, Charles-Antoine. Parallèle de l'architecture, antique avec la moderne... Nouvelle edition, augmentée... par Charles Antoine Jombert... Paris: C.-A Jombert.
- 1740. Charles-Nicholas Cochin, Paul Farinaste e Charles-Antoine Jombert. Nouvelle methode pour apprendre a dessiner sans maitre. Où l'on explique par de nouvelles démonstrations les premiers elémens & les regles generales de ce grand art, avec la maniere de l'étudier pour s'y perfectionner en peu de tems. Le tout accompagné de quantité d'exemples, de plusieurs figures académiques dessinées d'après nature, & des proportions du corps humain d'après l'antique. Enrichi de cent vingt planches. Paris: chez Charles-Antoine Jombert.

== Receiverships and printed editions ==
- 1755. Cochin, Charles Nicolas, Bellicard, Jerome-Charles. Observations sur les antiquites d'Herculanum; avec quelques reflexions sur la peinture et la sculpture des anciens; & une courte description de plusieurs antiquites des environs de Naples. Par MM. Cochin & Bellicard. Paris: chez Ch. Ant. Jombert.
- 1756. Cochin, Charles Nicolas. Voyage pittoresque d'Italie, ou Recueil de notes sur les ouvrages de peinture & sculpture, qu'on voit dans les principales villes d'Italie. Par m. Cochin, graveur du roi ... . Paris: de l'imprimerie de Ch. An. Jombert.
- 1763. Antoine de Leris. Dictionnaire portatif historique et litteraire des theatres, contenant l'origine des differans theatres de Paris ... Par M. de Leris. Seconde edition, revue, corrigee et considerablemet augmentee. A Paris: chez C. A. Jombert, libraire du Roi en son Artillerie.
- 1770. Charles-Antoine Jombert. Catalogue de l'Œuvre de Ch. Nic. Cochin Fils, Ecuyer, Chevalier de l'Ordre du Roy, Censeur Royal, Garde des Desseins du Cabinet de Sa Majesté, Secrétaire et Historiographe de l'Académie Royale de Peinture et de Sculpture. Paris: Imprimerie de Prault.

== Bibliography ==
- C. Bousquet-Bressolier, Charles-Antoine Jombert (1712-1784). Un libraire entre sciences et arts. Bulletin du bibliophile, 1997, n. 2, pp. 299–333. Paris: Electre éditions.
- G. Kaucher, Les Jomberts. Une famille de libraires parisiens dans l’Europe des Lumières, 1680-1824, Droz, Genève 2015.
- Descamps, Jean-Baptiste. La Vie des Peintres Flamands, Allemands et Hollandois. Book I (1753) and book II (1754)
- Jombert, Charles-Antoine; Cochin, Charles-Nicolas (1755). Methode Pour Apprendre Le Dessein: Ou l'on donne les Regles générales de ce grand Art, & des préceptes pour en acquérir la connoissance, & s'y perfectionner en peu de tems. Paris: Charles-Antoine Jombert.
