= Thunstetten =

- Municipality
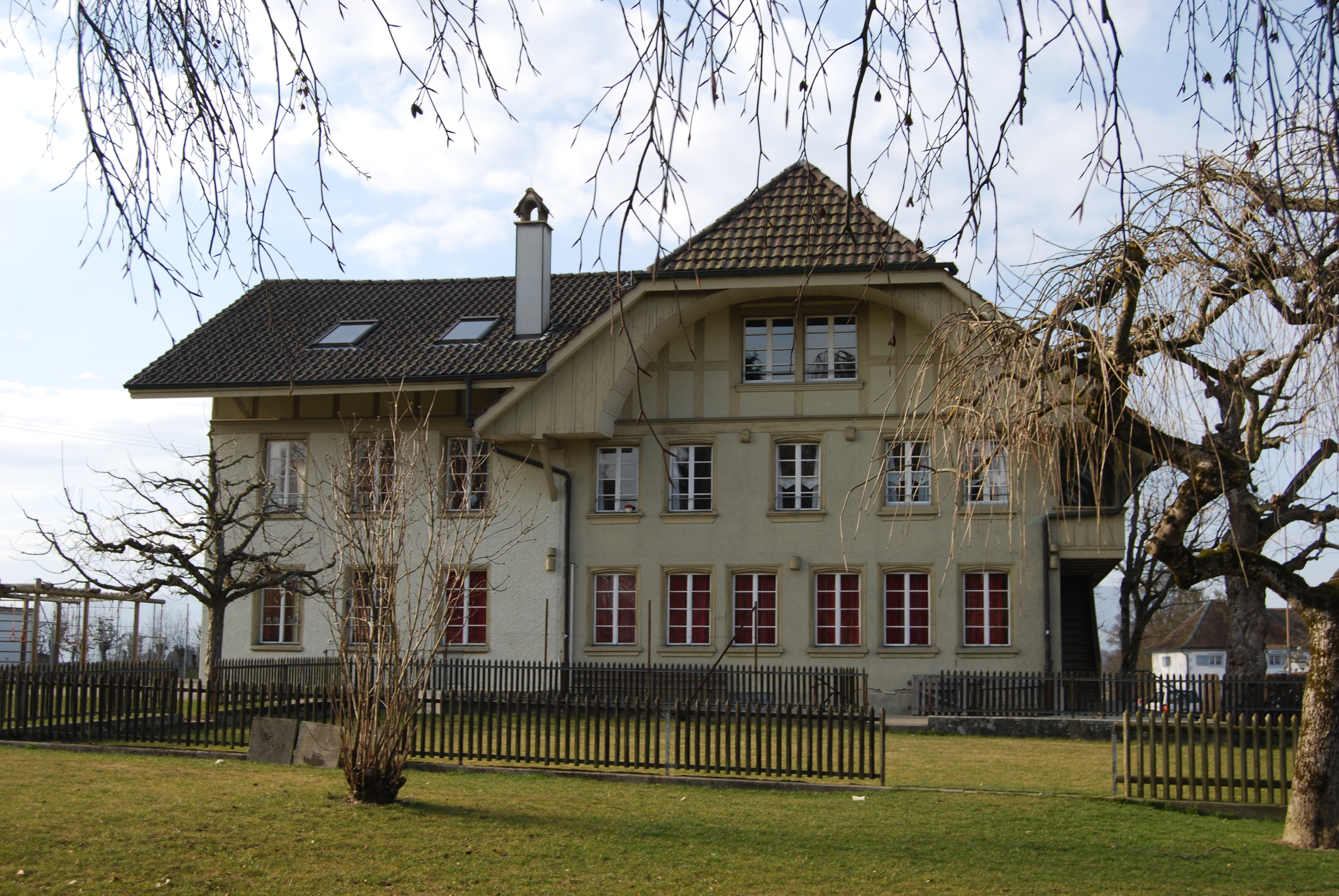

- Flag Coat of arms
- Location of Thunstetten
- Location within Switzerland Location within Canton of Bern
- Coordinates: 47°12′N 7°45′E
- Country: Switzerland
- Canton: Bern
- District: Oberaargau

Area
  - Total: 9.7 km^{2} (3.7 sq mi)
- Elevation: 541.1 m (1,775 ft)

Population (December 2020)
  - Total: 3,458
  - Density: 360/km^{2} (920/sq mi)
- Time zone: UTC+01:00 (CET)
  - Summer (DST): UTC+02:00 (CEST)
- Postal code: 4922
- SFOS number: 342
- ISO 3166 code: CH-BE
- Surrounded by: Aarwangen, Bleienbach, Graben, Herzogenbuchsee, Langenthal, Thörigen
- Website: www.thunstetten.ch

Thunstetten is a municipality in the Oberaargau administrative district in the canton of Bern in Switzerland.

== History ==
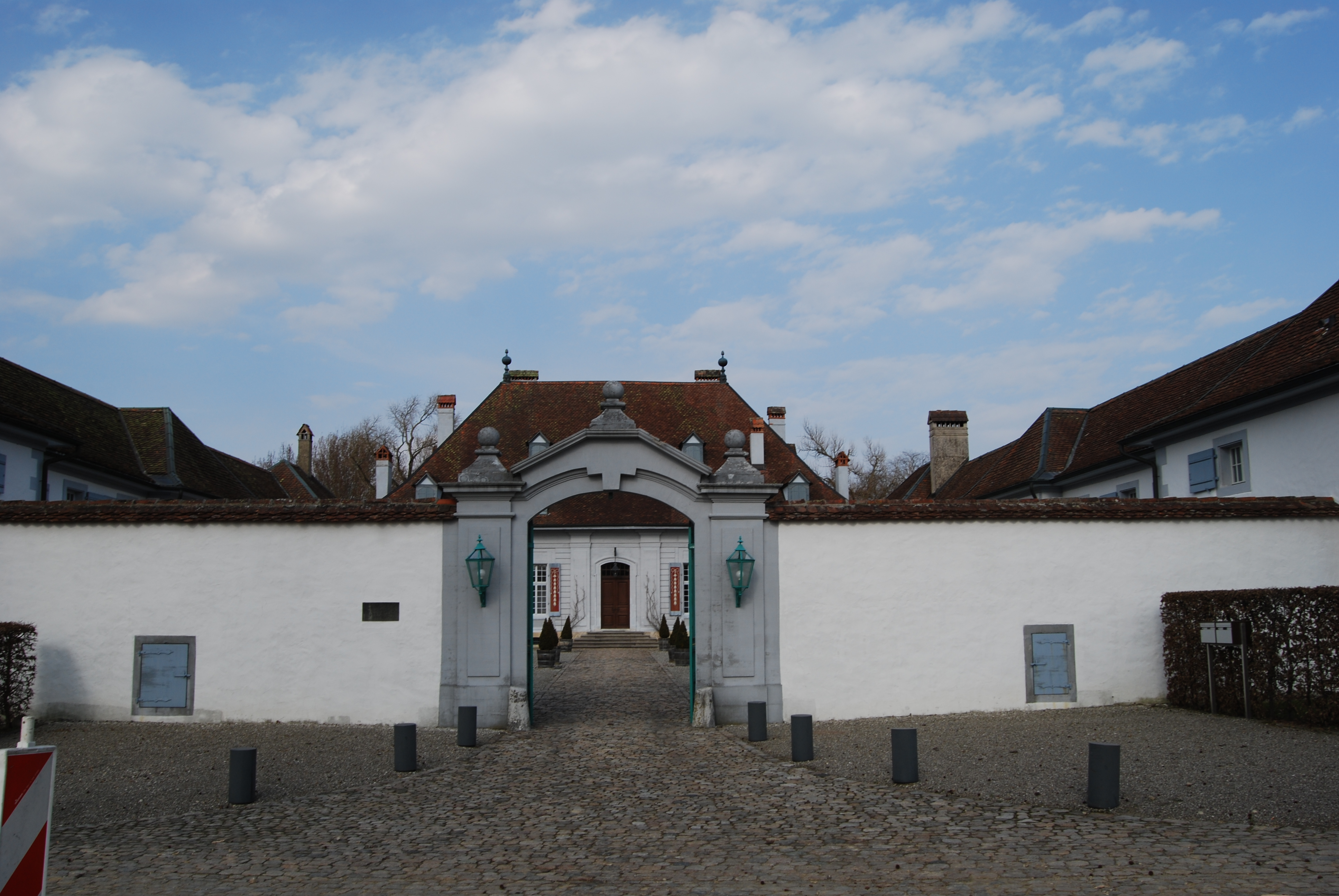
Thunstetten Castle

Aerial view by Bützberg by Walter Mittelholzer (1923)

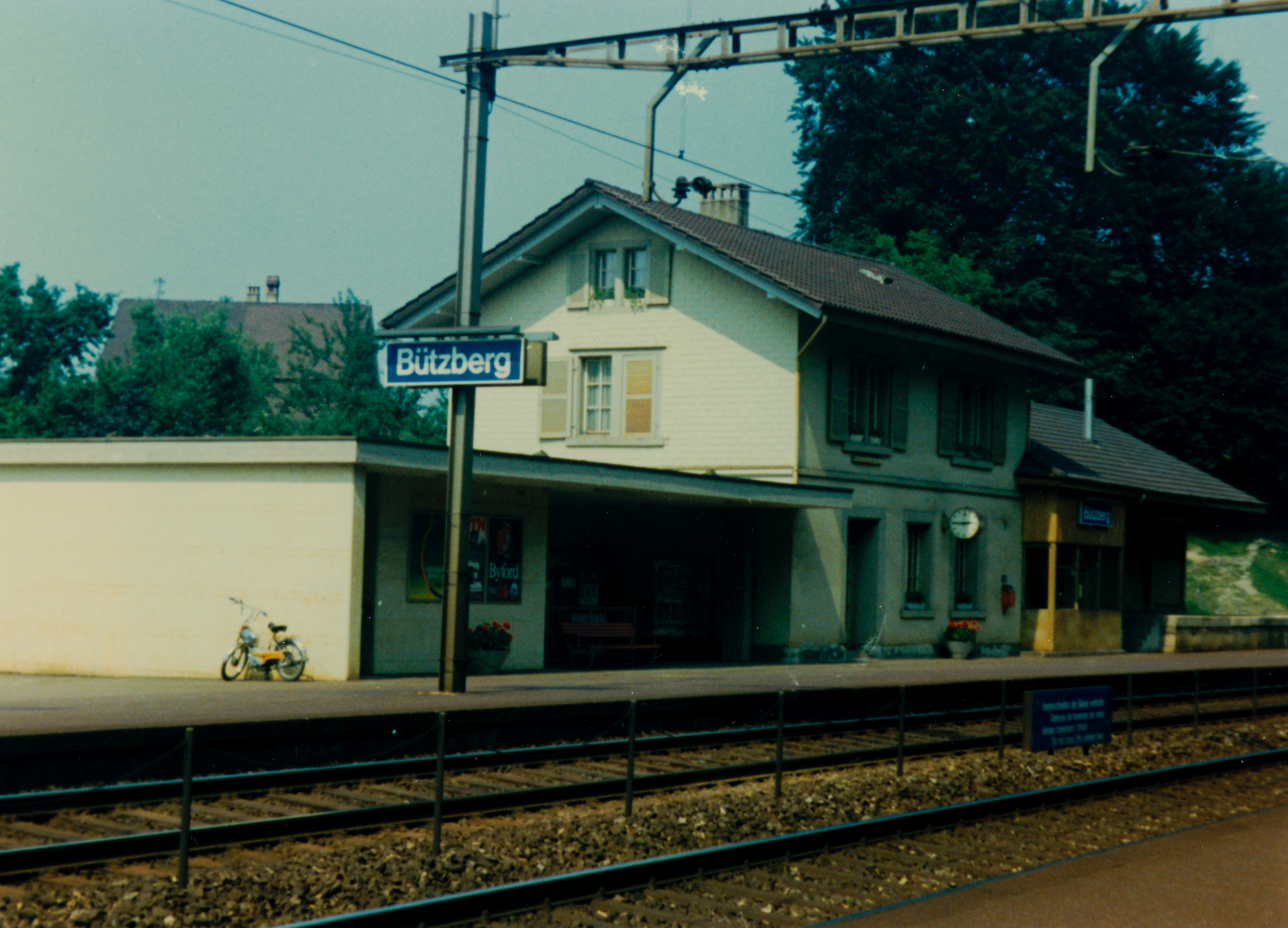
Bützberg railway station (1975, before closure 1983)

Thunstetten is first mentioned in 1220 as Tunchsteten.

Individual artifacts from the Neolithic era have been found in the Thunstetterwald. Hallstatt era grave mounds are in Tannwäldli and Bützberg.

The Thunstetten Commandery was established prior to 1210 for the Knights Hospitaller by an unknown benefactor. During the 13th and 14th centuries, the Commandery lands grew with donations and purchases from local nobles. At the height of their power, they owned land in Oberaargau, the Bernese Seeland and around Solothurn. They bought vineyards in Twann and rights over village churches in Lotzwil, Ursenbach, Egerkingen, Aetigen, Rohrbach and Waldkirchen (now part of Niederbipp).

As the Commandery grew, Thunstetten also grew. It had its own seal starting in 1274 and in 1320 entered into a Burgrecht agreement with Wangen. It entered into Burgrecht agreements with Bern in 1329, 1466, 1494 and 1504. Following the Protestant Reformation in 1528, the Commandery was secularized and its lands became the property of Bern. The former Commandery lands passed to the Bernese bailiff in Aarwangen.

In 1711-13 Hieronymus von Erlach built Thunstetten Castle. Then in 1713 and 1721 he combined the herrschaft of Thunstetten with the low court of Thunstetten, which did not include Bützberg. The castle remained with the Erlach family until 1746, after which it changed hands multiple times. A foundation was established in 1971 to maintain and manage the castle as a Swiss heritage site of national significance.

The area of today's municipality consisted of various population centers in the 13th century, which became villages in the 14th. The farmers raised crops and sometimes vineyards on the lands around the small villages. The villages remained fairly small, in 1780 Bützberg was the largest with 31 houses, Welschland had 24 and Thunstetten had 21. During the 18th and 19th centuries, many of the large farms were subdivided into smaller ones while the commons became private property. The small farmers, who lacked enough land to feed their families and relied on the commons to make up the difference, were forced to find additional income from cottage industries such as weaving, knitting, spinning and yarn selling. In 1798, a total of 400 Juchart (144 ha [360 acres]) (a measurement of acreage related to the Roman Jugerum, 1 Juchart was .36 hectares [0.89 acres]) of forest and 200 Juchart (72 ha [180 acres]) of pastures became private. By 1855, the local farmers had transitioned to dairy and cattle farming and dairy cooperatives opened in each village. While agriculture still plays a major role in the municipality, well-developed transport links in the village of Bützberg allowed industry and commerce to grow in that village. Bützberg is now home to almost two-thirds of the population and the municipal administration for the entire municipality.

== Geography ==
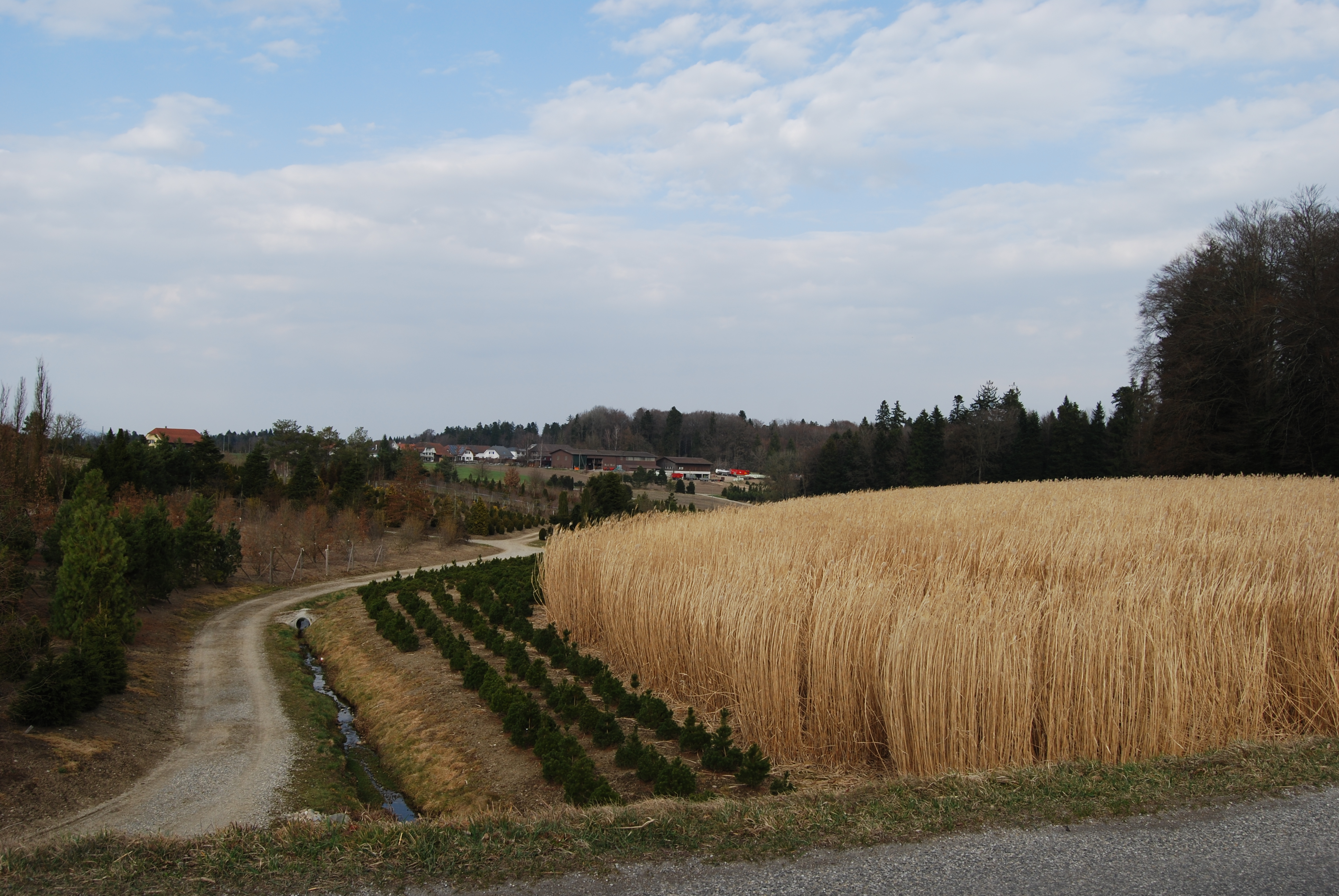
Fields outside Thunstetten

Thunstetten has an area of 9.66 km^{2} (3.73 sq mi). Of this area, 5.2 km^{2} (2.0 mi^{2}) or 53.9% is used for agricultural purposes, while 2.53 km^{2} (0.98 mi^{2}) or 26.2% is forested. Of the rest of the land, 1.91 km^{2} (0.74 mi^{2}) or 19.8% is settled (buildings or roads), 0.03 km^{2} (7.4 acres) or 0.3% is either rivers or lakes and 0.01 km^{2} (2.5 acres) or 0.1% is unproductive land.

Of the built up area, industrial buildings made up 2.0% of the total area while housing and buildings made up 9.3% and transportation infrastructure made up 7.4%. Out of the forested land, all of the forested land area is covered with heavy forests. Of the agricultural land, 38.4% is used for growing crops and 9.9% is pastures, while 5.5% is used for orchards or vine crops. All the water in the municipality is in lakes.

The municipality is located in the Oberaargau region. It consists of the villages of Thunstetten and Bützberg as well as many scattered small settlements.

On 31 December 2009 Amtsbezirk Aarwangen, the municipality's former district, was dissolved. On the following day, 1 January 2010, it joined the newly created Verwaltungskreis Oberaargau.

== Coat of arms ==
The blazon of the municipal coat of arms is Gules a Latin Cross throughout Argent.

== Demographics ==
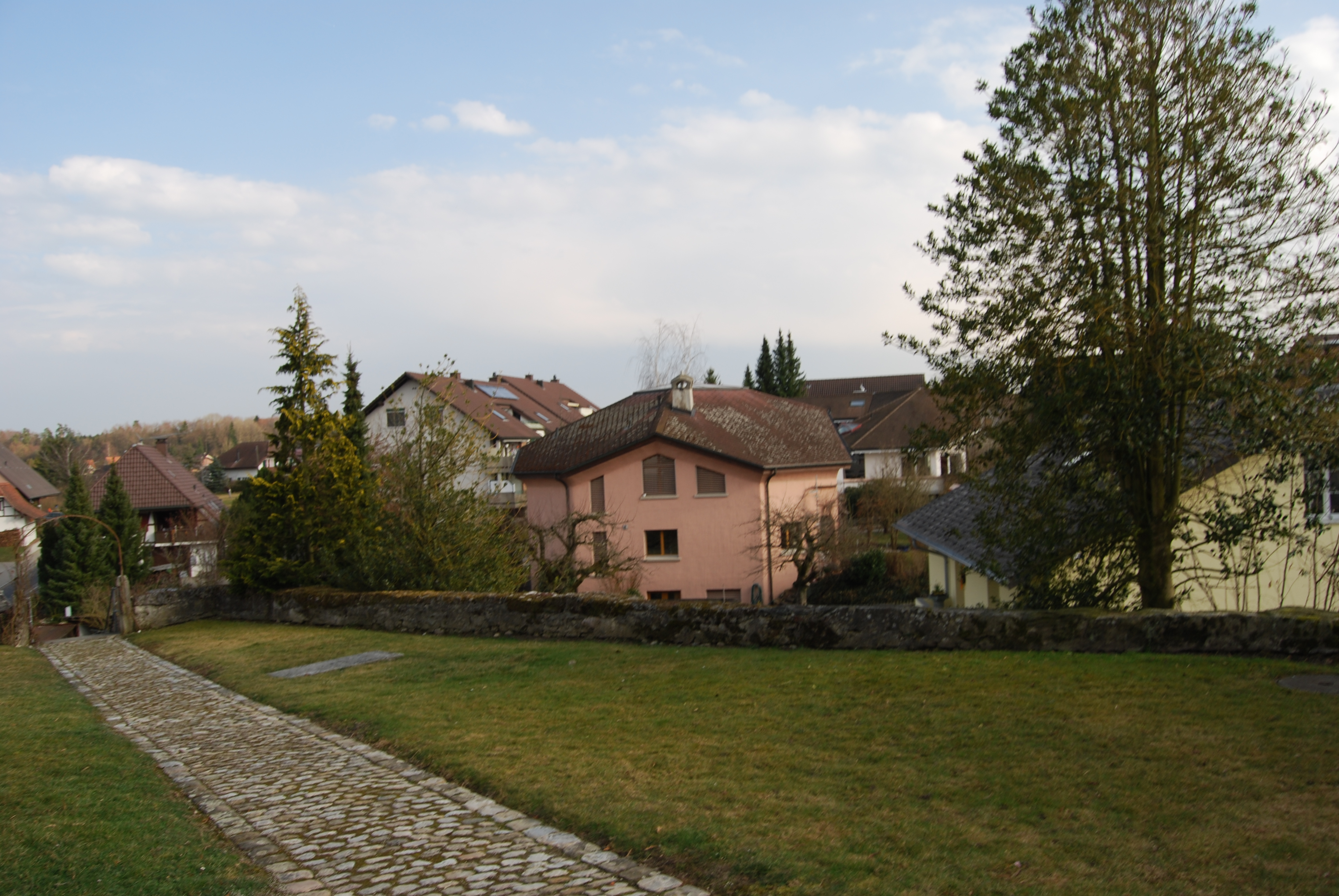
Newer houses in Thunstetten

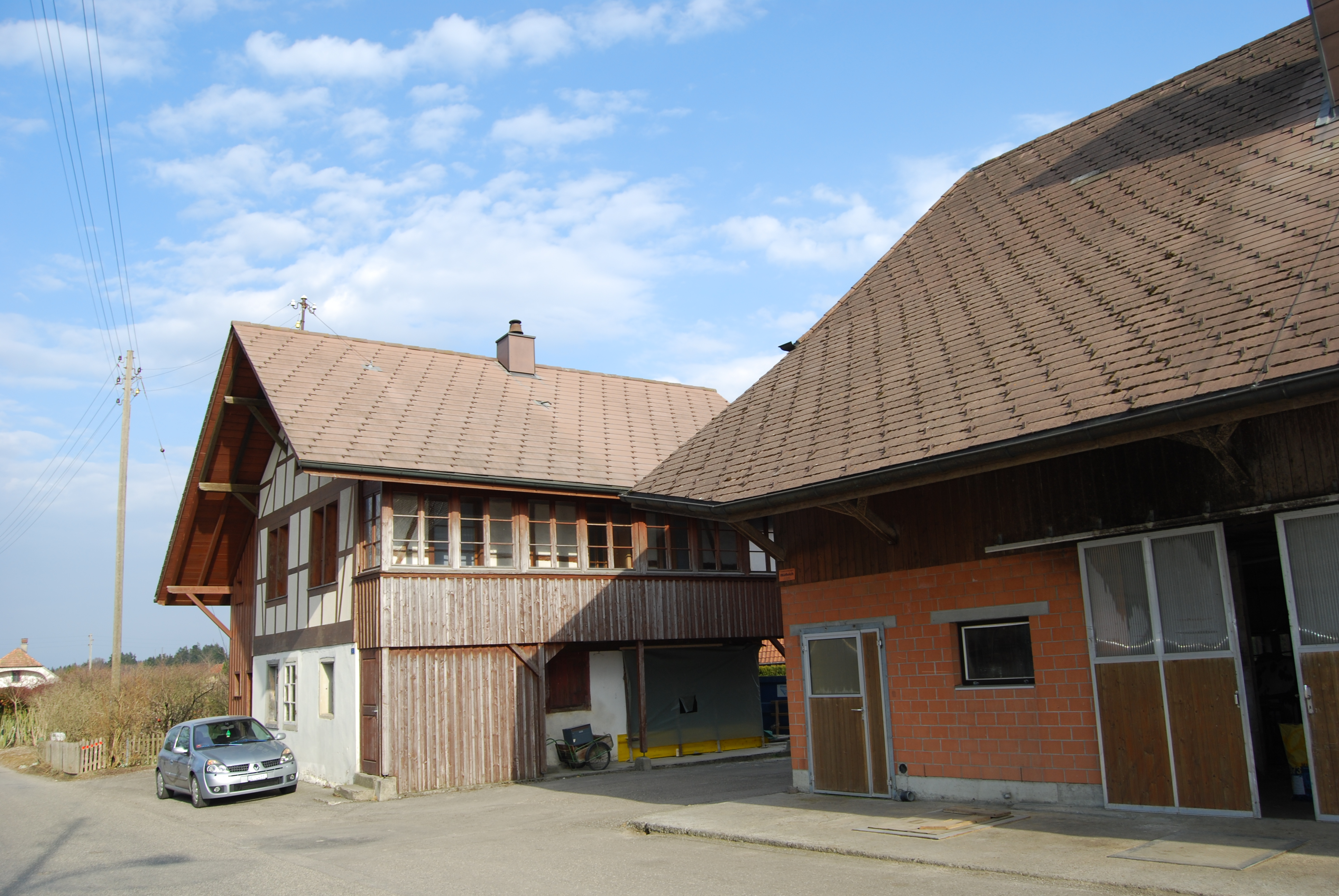
Half timbered house

Thunstetten has a population (as of December 2020) of 3,458. As of 2010, 15.9% of the population are resident foreign nationals. Over the last 10 years (2000-2010) the population has changed at a rate of 0.1%. Migration accounted for 1.6%, while births and deaths accounted for 0.9%.

Most of the population (as of 2000) speaks German (2,671 or 90.3%) as their first language, Albanian is the second most common (79 or 2.7%) and Italian is the third (39 or 1.3%). There are 16 people who speak French and 1 person who speaks Romansh.

As of 2008, the population was 51.3% male and 48.7% female. The population was made up of 1,297 Swiss men (42.6% of the population) and 264 (8.7%) non-Swiss men. There were 1,263 Swiss women (41.5%) and 219 (7.2%) non-Swiss women. Of the population in the municipality, 783 or about 26.5% were born in Thunstetten and lived there in 2000. There were 1,241 or 42.0% who were born in the same canton, while 554 or 18.7% were born somewhere else in Switzerland, and 364 or 12.3% were born outside of Switzerland.

As of 2010, children and teenagers (0–19 years old) make up 21.9% of the population, while adults (20–64 years old) make up 60.6% and seniors (over 64 years old) make up 17.5%.

As of 2000, there were 1,177 people who were single and never married in the municipality. There were 1,487 married individuals, 148 widows or widowers and 145 individuals who are divorced.

As of 2000, there were 333 households that consist of only one person and 93 households with five or more people. In 2000, a total of 1,190 apartments (93.0% of the total) were permanently occupied, while 15 apartments (1.2%) were seasonally occupied and 74 apartments (5.8%) were empty. As of 2010, the construction rate of new housing units was 6.2 new units per 1000 residents. The vacancy rate for the municipality, in 2011, was 3.25%.

The historical population is given in the following chart:

== Heritage sites of national significance ==
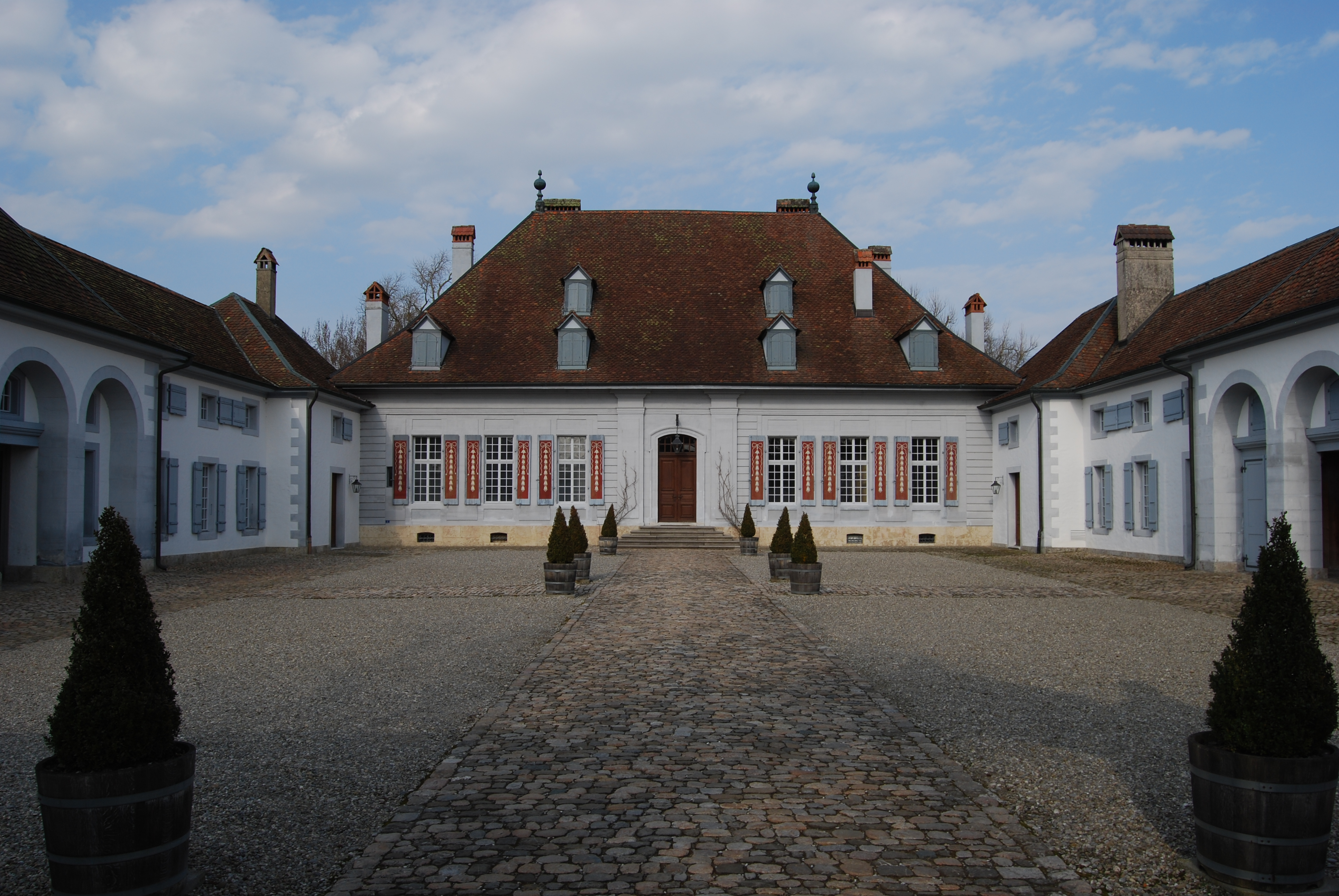
Courtyard of Thunstetten Castle

Thunstetten Castle is listed as a Swiss heritage site of national significance.

Thunstetten Castle was built as a country manor house in the Bernese Oberaargau in 1711 to 1713 or 1713 to 1715. The castle was built for the Landvogt Hieronymus von Erlach following plans by the architect Joseph Abeille. The castle remained with the Erlach family until 1746. From 1746 until 1971 it had numerous owners. In 1971 the Stiftung Schloss Thunstetten (Thunstetten Castle Foundation) took over management of the building and grounds. Today rooms in the castle or the entire castle can be rented for events or meetings.

== Politics ==
In the 2011 federal election the most popular party was the SVP which received 32.8% of the vote. The next three most popular parties were the SPS (19.6%), the BDP Party (13.7%) and the FDP (11.3%). In the federal election, a total of 978 votes were cast, and the voter turnout was 45.8%.

== Economy ==
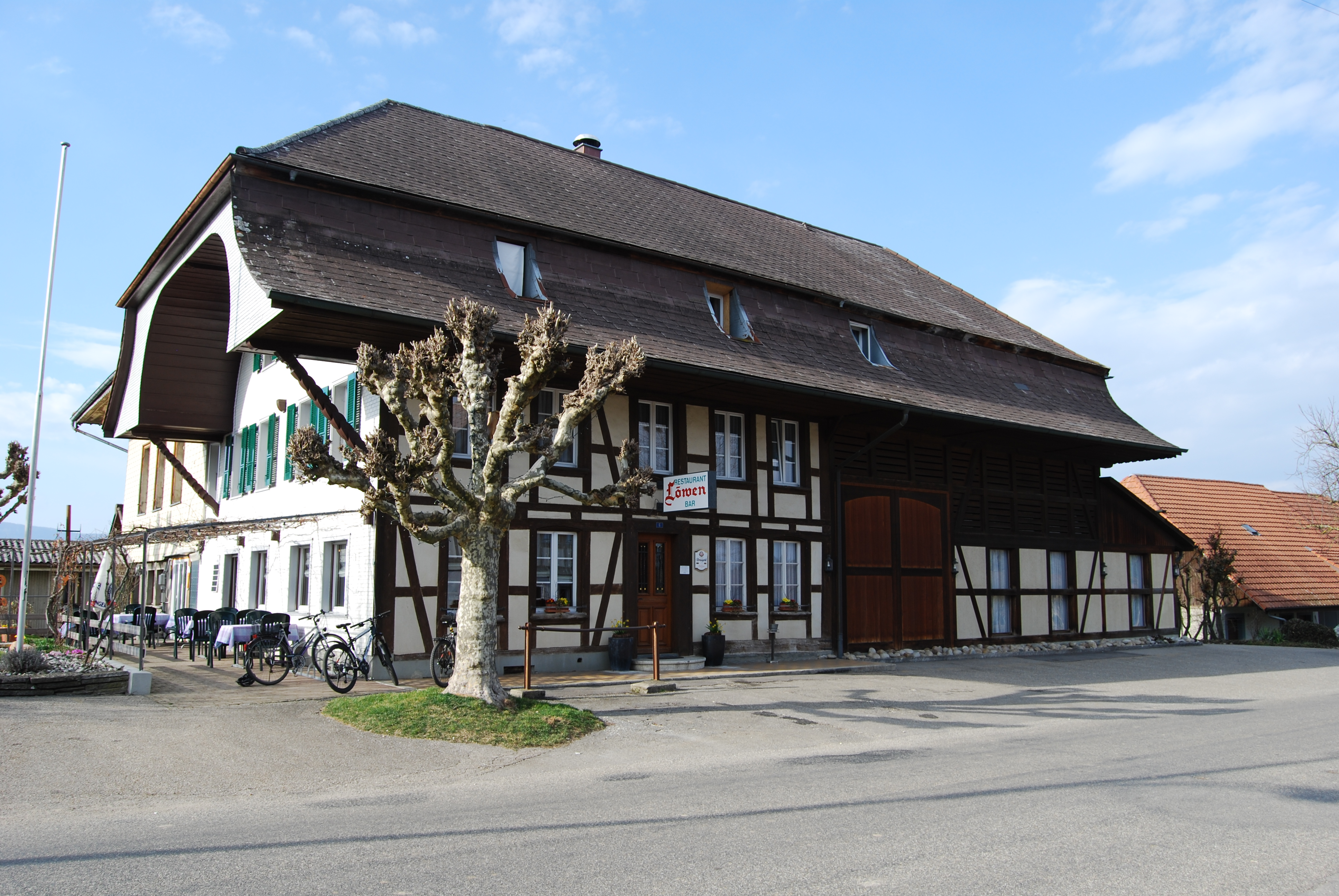
Restaurant Löwen in Thunstetten

As of 2011, Thunstetten had an unemployment rate of 2.6%. As of 2008, there were a total of 1,669 people employed in the municipality. Of these, there were 136 people employed in the primary economic sector and about 39 businesses involved in this sector. 897 people were employed in the secondary sector and there were 41 businesses in this sector. 636 people were employed in the tertiary sector, with 80 businesses in this sector.

In 2008 there were a total of 1,451 full-time equivalent jobs. The number of jobs in the primary sector was 87, of which 85 were in agriculture and 2 were in forestry or lumber production. The number of jobs in the secondary sector was 847 of which 769 or (90.8%) were in manufacturing and 78 (9.2%) were in construction. The number of jobs in the tertiary sector was 517. In the tertiary sector; 158 or 30.6% were in wholesale or retail sales or the repair of motor vehicles, 90 or 17.4% were in the movement and storage of goods, 27 or 5.2% were in a hotel or restaurant, 2 or 0.4% were in the information industry, 151 or 29.2% were technical professionals or scientists, 4 or 0.8% were in education and 23 or 4.4% were in health care.

In 2000, there were 1,422 workers who commuted into the municipality and 1,054 workers who commuted away. The municipality is a net importer of workers, with about 1.3 workers entering the municipality for every one leaving. Of the working population, 12.2% used public transportation to get to work, and 55.2% used a private car.

== Religion ==
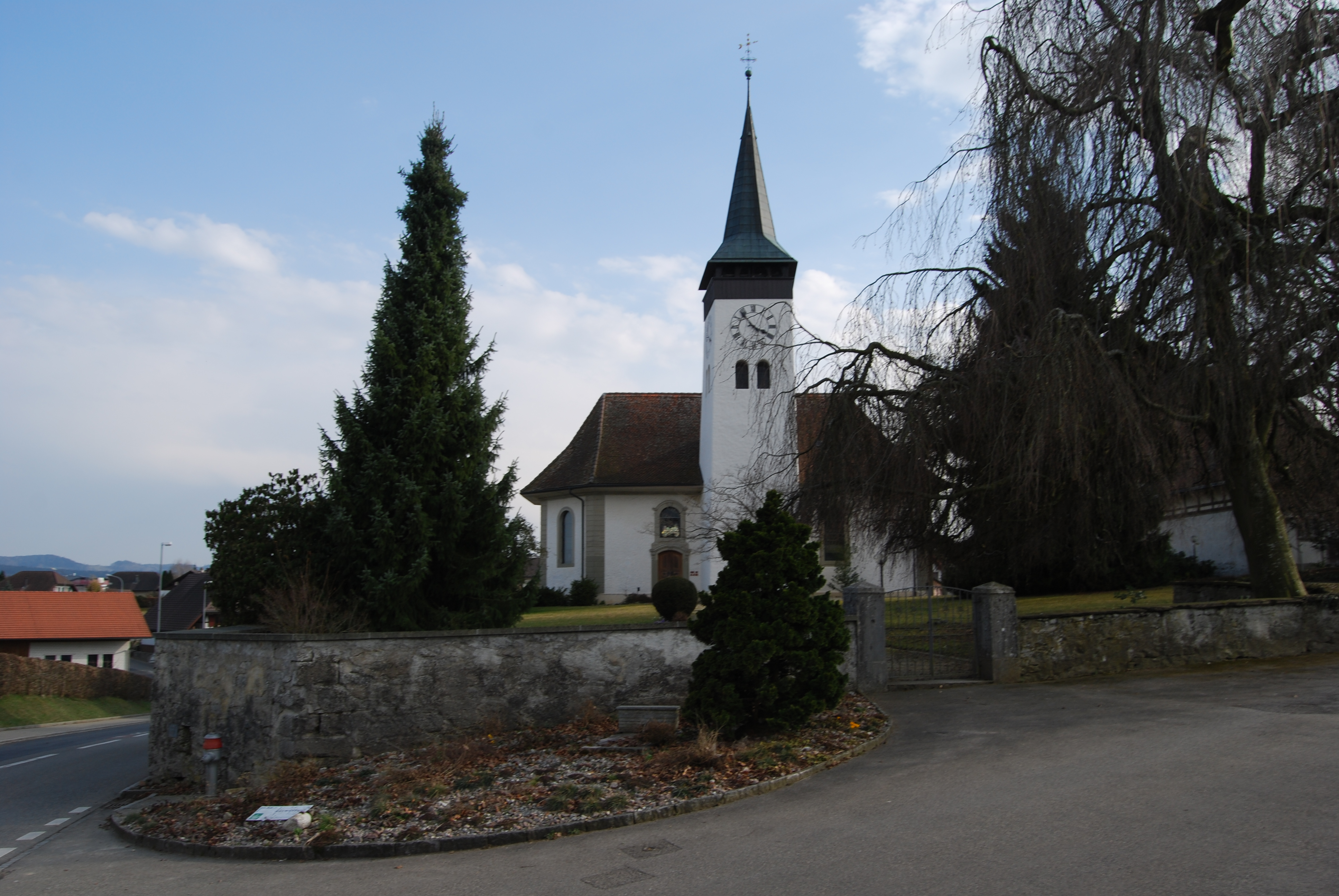
Thunstetten Swiss Reformed church

From the 2000 census, 401 or 13.6% were Roman Catholic, while 2,025 or 68.5% belonged to the Swiss Reformed Church. Of the rest of the population, there were 13 members of an Orthodox church (or about 0.44% of the population), there was 1 individual who belongs to the Christian Catholic Church, and there were 177 individuals (or about 5.99% of the population) who belonged to another Christian church. There were 5 individuals (or about 0.17% of the population) who were Jewish, and 159 (or about 5.38% of the population) who were Islamic. There were 3 individuals who were Buddhist, 47 individuals who were Hindu and 1 individual who belonged to another church. 191 (or about 6.46% of the population) belonged to no church, are agnostic or atheist, and 22 individuals (or about 0.74% of the population) did not answer the question.

== Education ==
In Thunstetten about 1,218 or (41.2%) of the population have completed non-mandatory upper secondary education, and 301 or (10.2%) have completed additional higher education (either university or a Fachhochschule). Of the 301 who completed tertiary schooling, 73.4% were Swiss men, 17.9% were Swiss women, 6.0% were non-Swiss men and 2.7% were non-Swiss women.

The Canton of Bern school system provides one year of non-obligatory Kindergarten, followed by six years of Primary school. This is followed by three years of obligatory lower Secondary school where the students are separated according to ability and aptitude. Following the lower Secondary students may attend additional schooling or they may enter an apprenticeship.

During the 2009-10 school year, there were a total of 335 students attending classes in Thunstetten. There were 3 kindergarten classes with a total of 60 students in the municipality. Of the kindergarten students, 28.3% were permanent or temporary residents of Switzerland (not citizens) and 41.7% have a different mother language than the classroom language. The municipality had 11 primary classes and 215 students. Of the primary students, 21.9% were permanent or temporary residents of Switzerland (not citizens) and 30.7% have a different mother language than the classroom language. During the same year, there were 3 lower secondary classes with a total of 60 students. There were 36.7% who were permanent or temporary residents of Switzerland (not citizens) and 33.3% have a different mother language than the classroom language.

As of 2000, there were 36 students in Thunstetten who came from another municipality, while 149 residents attended schools outside the municipality.

== Crime ==
In 2014 the crime rate, of the over 200 crimes listed in the Swiss Criminal Code (running from murder, robbery and assault to accepting bribes and election fraud), in Thunstetten was 55.8 per thousand residents. During the same period, the rate of drug crimes was 5.2 per thousand residents. This rate is lower than average, only 68.4% of the rate in the district, 38.5% of the cantonal rate and 52.5% of the national rate. The rate of violations of immigration, visa and work permit laws was 3.3 per thousand residents. This rate is lower than average, only 67.3% of the rate for the entire country.
