= Gerard Melder =

Dutch painter

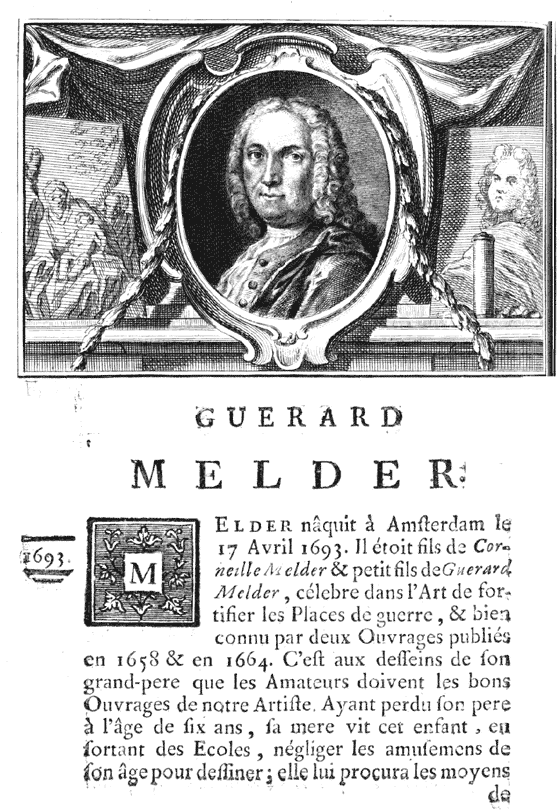
Guerard Melder in Jean-Baptiste Descamps' "La Vie des Peintres..."

Gerard Melder (1693 – 1754) was an 18th-century miniature and watercolor painter from the Dutch Republic.

== Biography ==
He was born in Amsterdam. According to Johan van Gool who devoted six pages to his biography in his Nieuwe Schouburg, Melder's father Cornelis Melder died when he was six, and he was named after his grandfather, the Utrecht fortifications master Gerard Melder, who published an instructional booklet in 1658 on the Utrecht fortifications. This younger Gerard Melder made copies on ivory after Rosalba Carriera whose miniatures he collected. He became acquainted with the works of Rosalba after Theodoor Wilkens returned from Italy with a few of them. Melder became, through practise, quite good at making Rosalba-like miniature copies of Dutch masters for snuffboxes, and later tried his hand at larger works. Van Gool mentioned copies by his hand of works by Gerard Dou, Adriaen van der Werff, and Hans Rottenhammer. In 1728 he married Margareta Schalkwijk a Velden, and in 1735 they moved to Utrecht.

Van Gool used a portrait of Margaretha Wulfraet that was in Melder's possession for his engraved portrait of her.

According to the RKD he was also a follower of Herman Saftleven, and is known for etchings and watercolors as well as his copied miniatures on ivory after old masters.

He died in Utrecht.
