= Jan Vaillant =

Dutch Golden Age painter

Jan Vaillant (1627 in Lille – 1668 in Hanau), was a Dutch Golden Age painter.

According to Houbraken he learned painting from his older brother Wallerant Vaillant, and then he moved to Frankfurt, where he married and became a merchant.

According to the RKD he was the younger brother of the painter Wallerant Vaillant. He moved to Frankfurt in 1653 and in the same year moved again to Frankenthal, where he stayed until 1668 and where he worked as a copper merchant. He is known for engravings, mezzotints, and landscapes in the manner of the school of Frankenthal.
