= Adam Pynacker =

Dutch painter

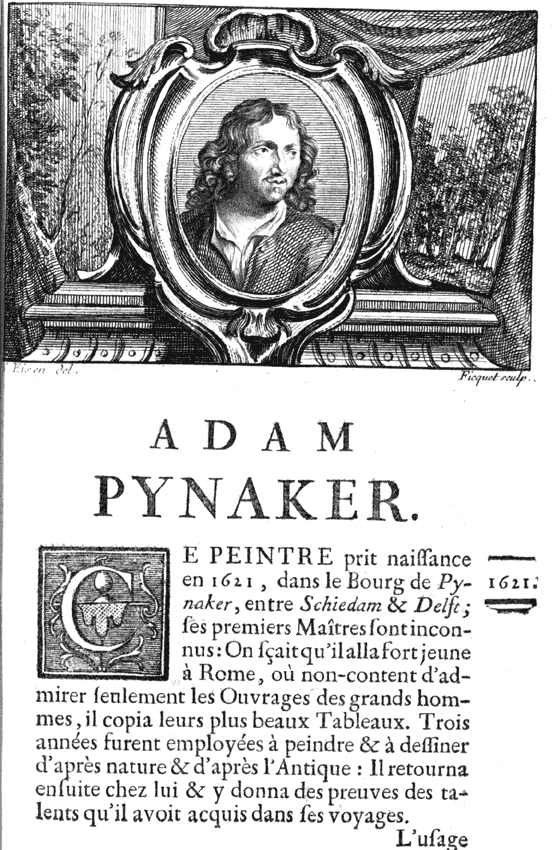
Pynacker featured with engraved portrait in part II of the 4 part series by Jean-Baptiste Descamps: "La Vie des Peintres Flamands, Allemands et Hollandois", 1754

Adam Christiaensz Pynacker or Pijnacker (15 February 1622, Schiedam - buried 28 March 1673, Amsterdam ) was a Dutch Golden Age painter, mostly of landscapes.

== Biography ==
Pynacker was the son of a wine merchant, who was a member of the vroedschap, or city regency. He travelled to Italy and was gone for three years. In 1658 he converted to Catholicism in order to marry Eva Maria de Geest, Wybrand de Geest's daughter. Two years later his portrait was painted by his father-in-law as a pendant to an earlier portrait of his wife. In Schiedam he baptized two children, but from 1661 until he died, he lived on the Rozengracht in Amsterdam.

=== Wedding portraits ===
De Geest was a highly successful portrait painter who painted his daughter in 1652 and two years after their marriage he painted his new son-in-law's portrait in a matching style as pendant:

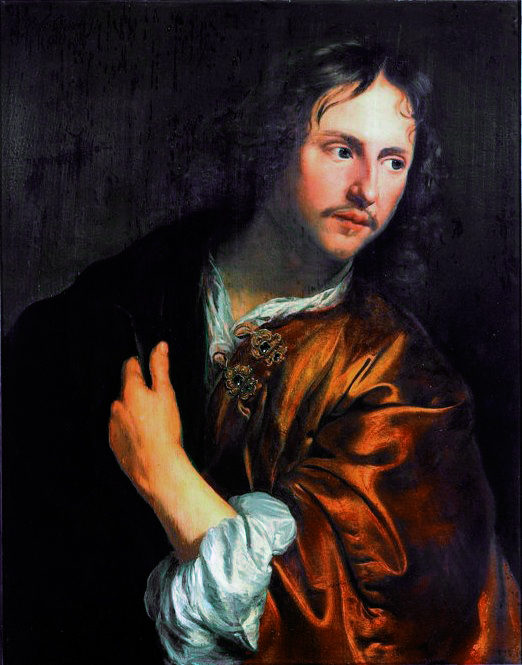
Adam Pynacker, by his father-in-law

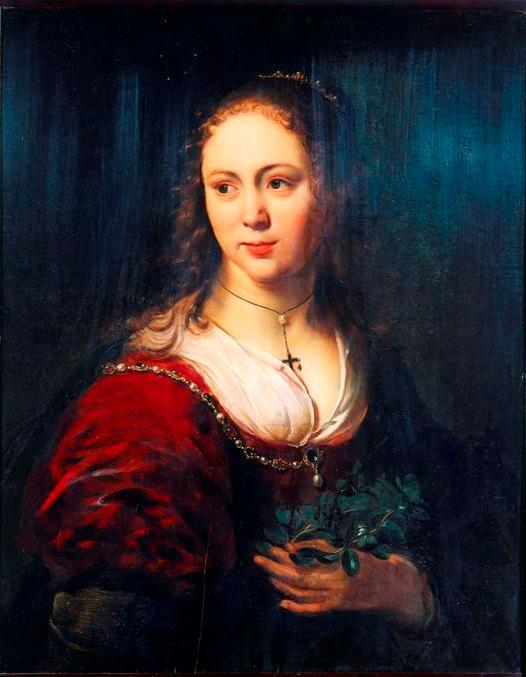
Eva de Geest, Pynnacker's wife

== Legacy ==
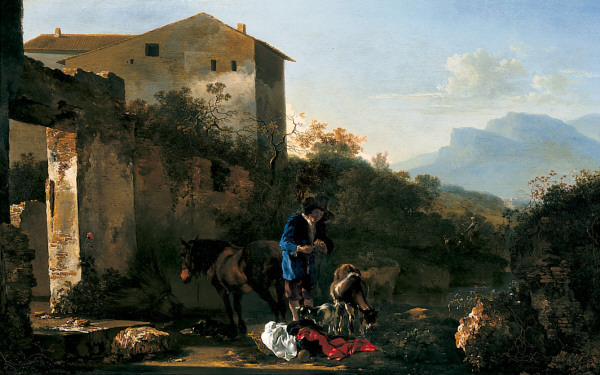
Landscape with a herd of goats, St. Louis Art Museum

Pynacker is considered an example of an Italianate landscape painter, along with Jan Both, Jan Baptist Weenix, Nicolaes Berchem and Jan Asselyn. He specialized in decorating whole rooms. According to Houbraken, he would turn in his grave if he knew how the fashions had changed, but the poet P. Verhoek wrote a poem about one of his decorated rooms.

Pijnacker's "Deer Hunt," which had been looted from Belgium, turned up on the Russian art market in 2009.
