= Matthijs Wulfraet =

Dutch Golden Age painter

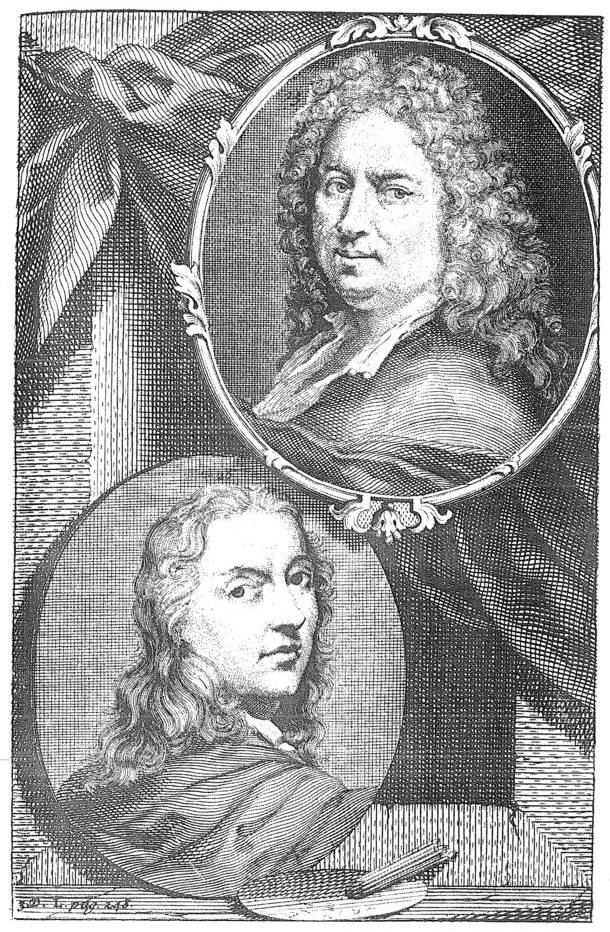
Mathys Wulfraat (top) in Arnold Houbraken's Schouburg, Volume 3

Mathijs Wulfraet (1 January 1648 – 1727) was a Dutch Golden Age painter.

== Biography ==
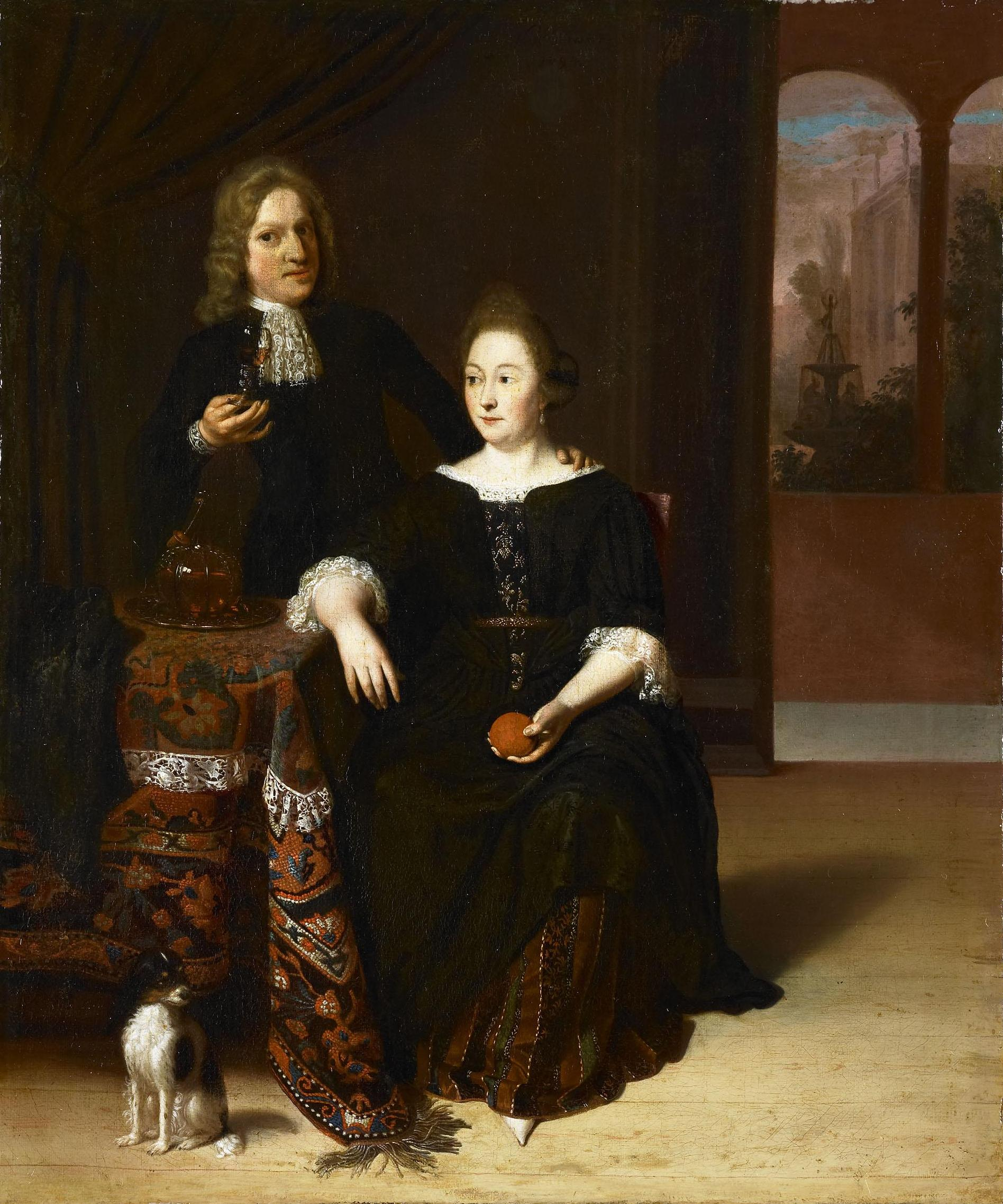
Portrait of a couple

Wulfraet was born in Arnhem. According to Houbraken he was born on New Year's Eve between midnight and one in the morning. His father, who came from Germany and was a language teacher and doctor, wanted his son to follow in his footsteps and sent him to Latin school. Young Mathijs had more interest in drawing than anything else and even though he was punished for drawing more often than studying, he went on collecting prints, drawings, and drawing utensils to keep up with his hobby. He met Abraham Diepraam who was visiting Arnhem and influenced the young amateur. Seeing that his son had already failed at two different schools, Mathijs father gave up and let Mathijs become Diepraam's pupil, especially since Diepraam had a good reputation in Arnhem and his paintings sold quite well there. When young Wulfraet within a short space of time became a successful artist in his own right, he moved to Amsterdam, where he was successful painting historical allegories and merry companies. He also learned to paint small portraits, which he sold while he was in Frankfurt. In Frankfurt he painted many travellers and important citizens. He reached a great age, and was able to teach his daughter Margaret his art, which she performed well. Houbraken was planning on devoting a page to her memory, but he never got around to it.

According to the RKD he was working in Arnhem between the years 1670-1683 and moved to Amsterdam at some point during the years 1681-1683, where he stayed. It is unknown at which point he travelled to Frankfurt, but he is registered there. He died in Amsterdam.
