= Abraham Diepraam =

Dutch painter

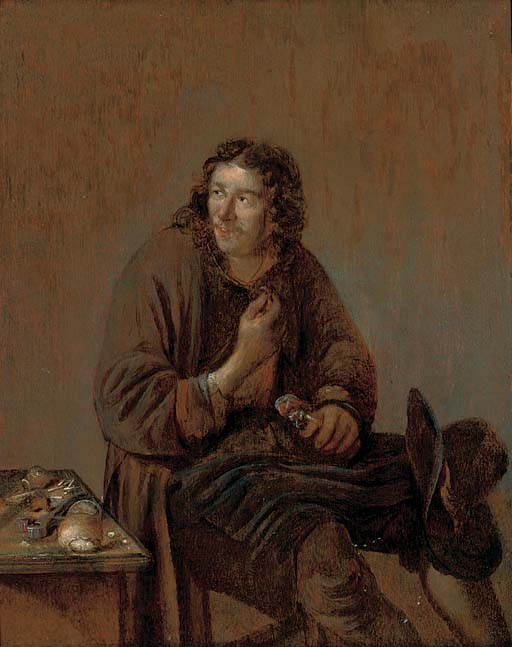
- A cobbler at work.
- Born: Abraham Diepraam; 23 January 1622; Rotterdam
- Died: 16 July 1670 (aged 48); Rotterdam
- Known for: Painting
- Movement: Baroque

Abraham Diepraam, or Diepraem (23 January 1622 – 16 July 1670), was a Dutch Golden Age painter.

== Life and career ==
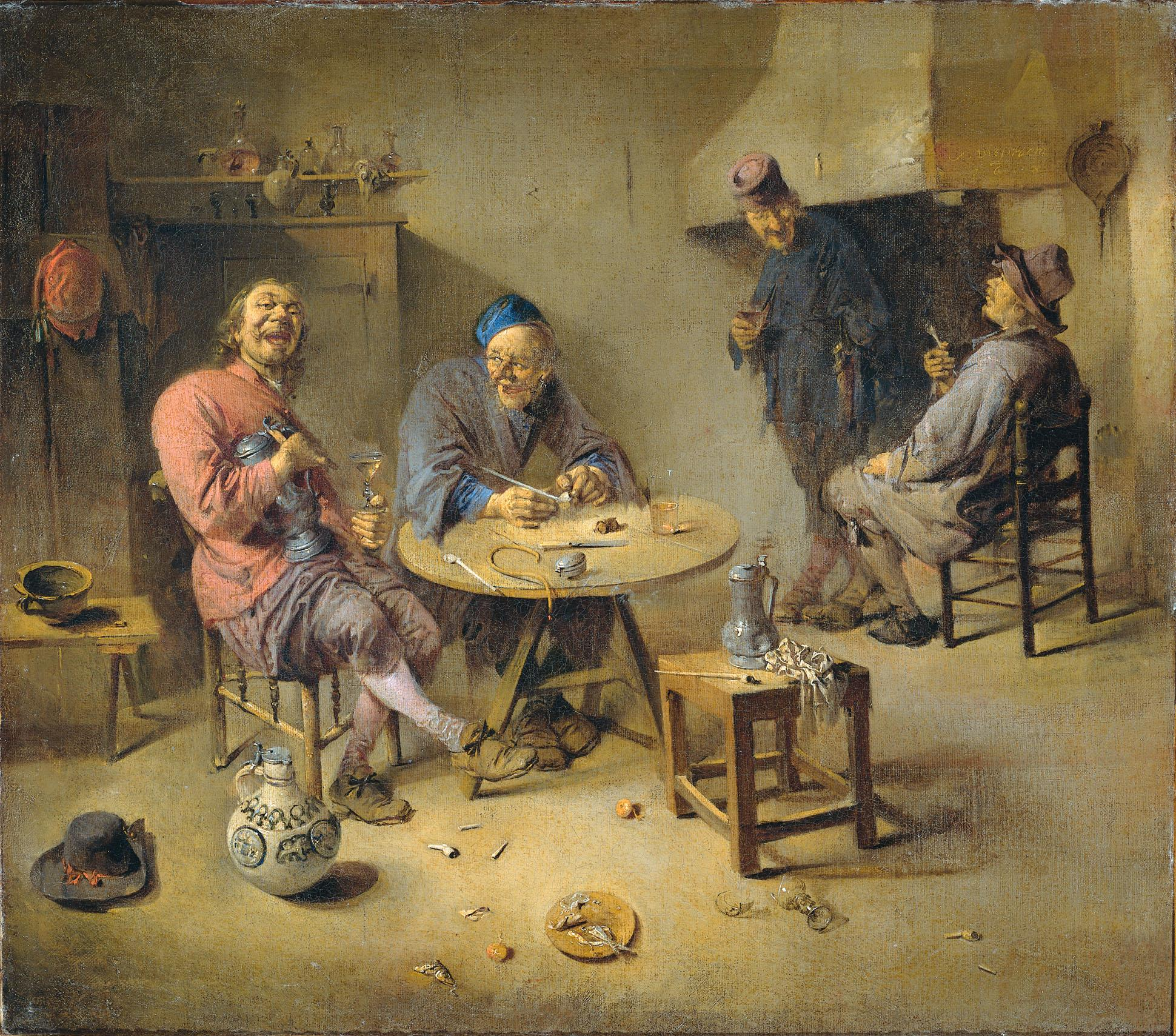
The Barroom, painted in 1665.

According to Houbraken, he first learned to paint from the father of Dirk Stoop, who had been a good glasspainter, and then he became a pupil of Hendrik Martenszoon Sorgh. After a trip through France he returned to the Netherlands and became a pupil of Adriaen Brouwer, whose style he copied the rest of his life. He joined the Guild of St. Luke in Dordrecht in 1648.

Houbraken claimed he made his acquaintance in 1674. This is somewhat hard to believe, since Diepraam died four years before that, but may explain why Houbraken had such a low opinion of him. Diepraam became a popular painter of small genre works, and sold many of these himself informally in taverns, where Houbaken clearly felt he also spent all of the proceeds on brandywine. Houbraken reports that by the end of his life he had gone out of fashion and tried selling his services as a painter with his painting box door to door, with little success. Houbraken's biggest criticism of Diepraam was not so much his lifestyle, but from what he claimed was poor brushwork. In a rare comparison to the work of Frans Hals, Houbraken claimed that Diepraam's style later in life reflected his lifestyle, and his brush strokes did not even melt together, but were loose lines without connection. Though Hals changed his style with disconnected brush strokes during his later years (this is what impressionist painters such as Vincent van Gogh admired the most about him), Houbraken claims he did this as a great master of the art, while Diepraam was just drunk. Perhaps Houbraken met some drunk claiming to be Diepraam himself, and who tried to sell Diepraam paintings after his death in 1674. This would explain why Houbraken formed his bad opinion, since like many of his contemporaries, Diepraam fell on hard times when the economic downturn spoiled the market.

According to the RKD his pupil was Matthijs Wulfraet. His paintings were quite popular, and are generally small interior tavern scenes with peasants drinking or smoking. Houbraken was much more complimentary over Diepraam in his biography of his pupil Wulfraet, claiming his works sold well in Arnhem and he was a good teacher for the young boy.
