= Wallerant Vaillant =

Dutch painter

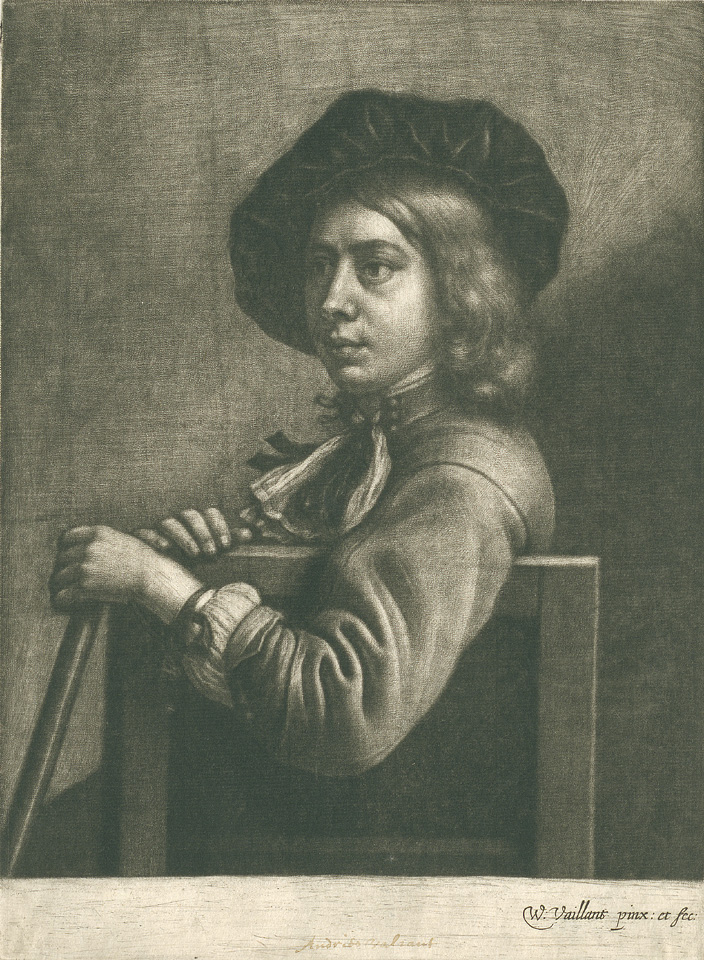
Young boy, possibly the brother of the artist, Mezzotint

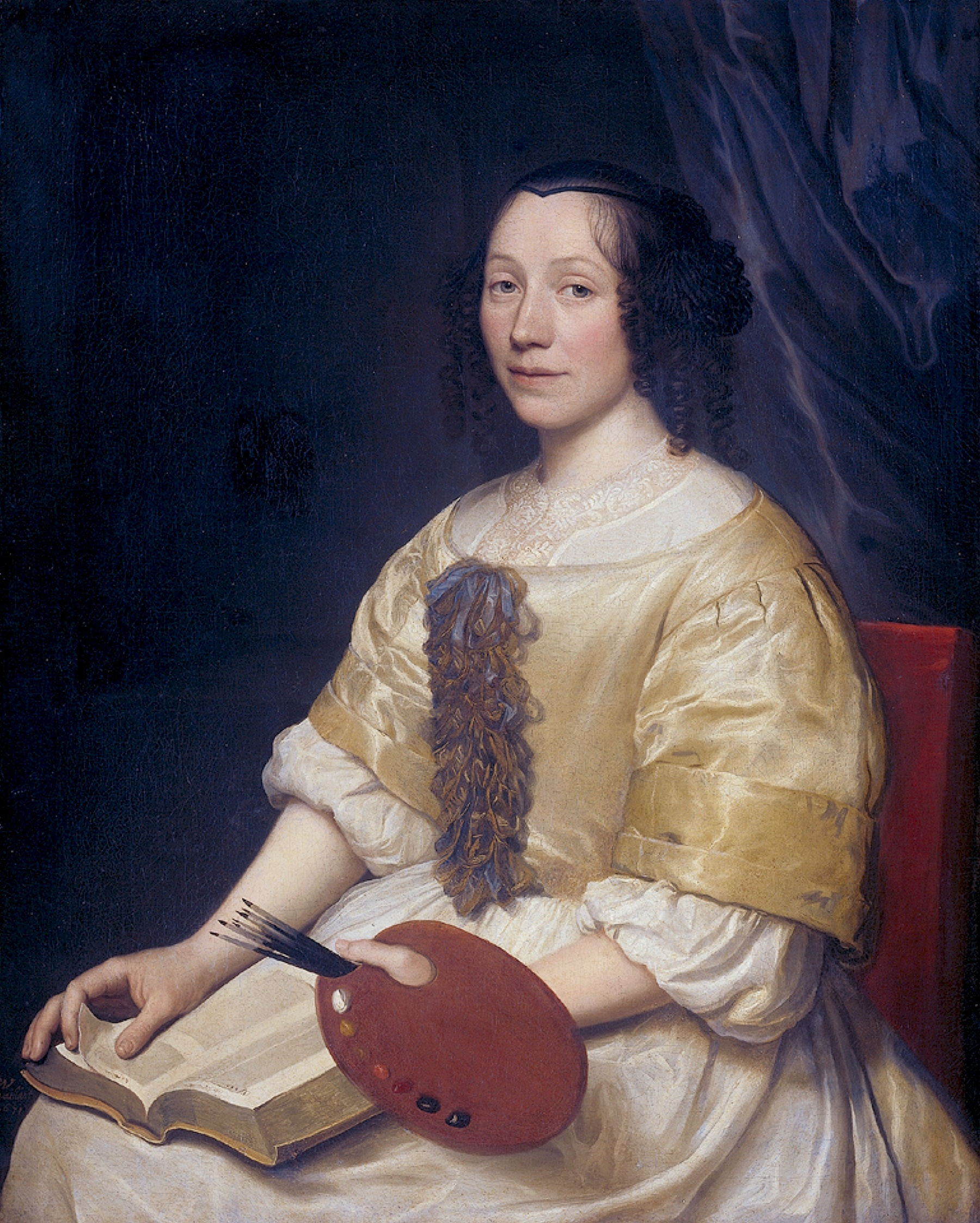
The painter Maria van Oosterwijck, 1671, by Wallerant Vaillant

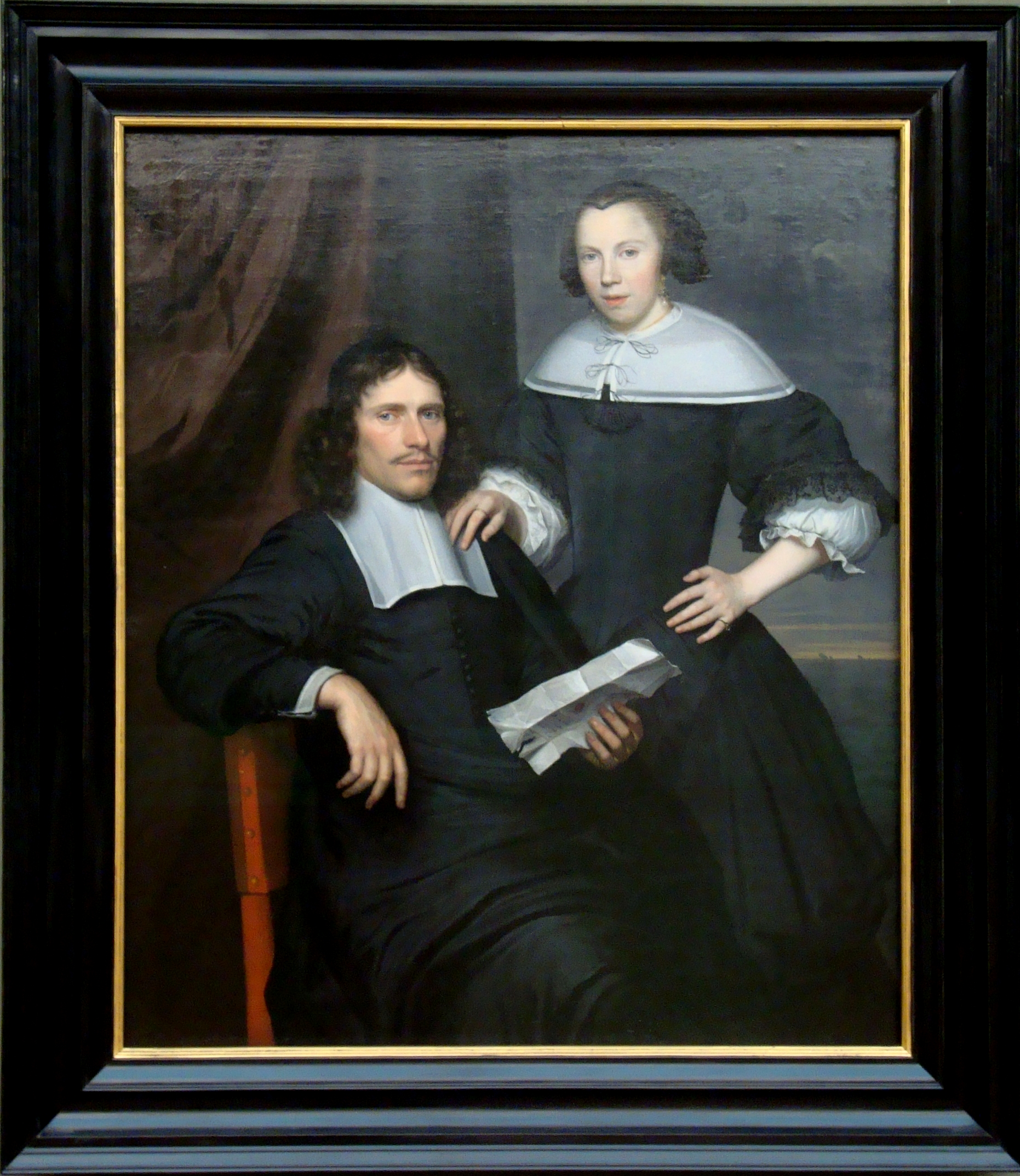
A couple painted by Wallerant Vaillant. (Gemäldegalerie, Berlin)

Wallerant Vaillant (30 May 1623 – 28 August 1677) was a painter of the Dutch Golden Age and one of the first artists to use the mezzotint technique, which he probably helped to develop.

== Family ==
Wallerant Vaillant was born in Lille, the oldest of five brothers who all became successful painters.

- Jacques (1625–1691) traveled to Italy where he joined the Bentvueghels in Rome with the nickname Leeuwrik, and settled later in Berlin.
- Jan (1627–1668+) was an engraver considered to be a member of the school of Frankenthal and later became a merchant in Frankfurt.
- Bernard (1632–1698) accompanied Wallerant on all of his travels, and settled later in Rotterdam, where he became deacon of the Wallonian Church.
- Andreas (1655–1693), the youngest, became an engraver in Paris, and died in Berlin visiting his brother Jacques.

== Education and career ==
It is said Wallerant was a student of Erasmus Quellinus II (1607–1678) in Antwerp. He moved with his parents in 1643 to Amsterdam. In 1647 he lived in Middelburg, but in 1649 he was back in Amsterdam. In 1658 he traveled with his brother to Frankfurt and Heidelberg. He helped invent the Mezzotint technique (schraapkunst, or zwartekunst) with Prince Rupert of the Rhine when he was his tutor performing experiments in etching techniques.

In 1659 he went to Paris with Philibert de Gramont where he stayed five years. In 1664 he settled in Amsterdam and became the court painter of John William Friso, Prince of Orange. He died in Amsterdam.

Vaillant is most remembered today for his mezzotints, rather than his paintings.

== Collections ==
Vaillant's work is held in the permanent collections of many museums worldwide, including the Ackland Art Museum, the Fine Arts Museums of San Francisco, the Allen Memorial Art Museum, the Museum Boijmans Van Beuningen, the Museum of Fine Arts, Houston, the Metropolitan Museum of Art, the Hood Museum of Art, the National Portrait Gallery in London, the University of Michigan Museum of Art, the National Gallery Prague, the Museum of Fine Arts, Budapest, the Victoria and Albert Museum, the Harvard Art Museums, the Kruizenga Art Museum, the Philadelphia Museum of Art, the Fitzwilliam Museum at Cambridge, and the Museum of Fine Arts, Boston.

== Sources ==
- (in Dutch) Vaillant biography in De groote schouburgh der Nederlantsche konstschilders en schilderessen (1718) by Arnold Houbraken, courtesy of the Digital library for Dutch literature
