= Thunstetten Castle =

Castle in Thunstetten, Switzerland

Coordinates: 47°12′19″N 7°45′13″E

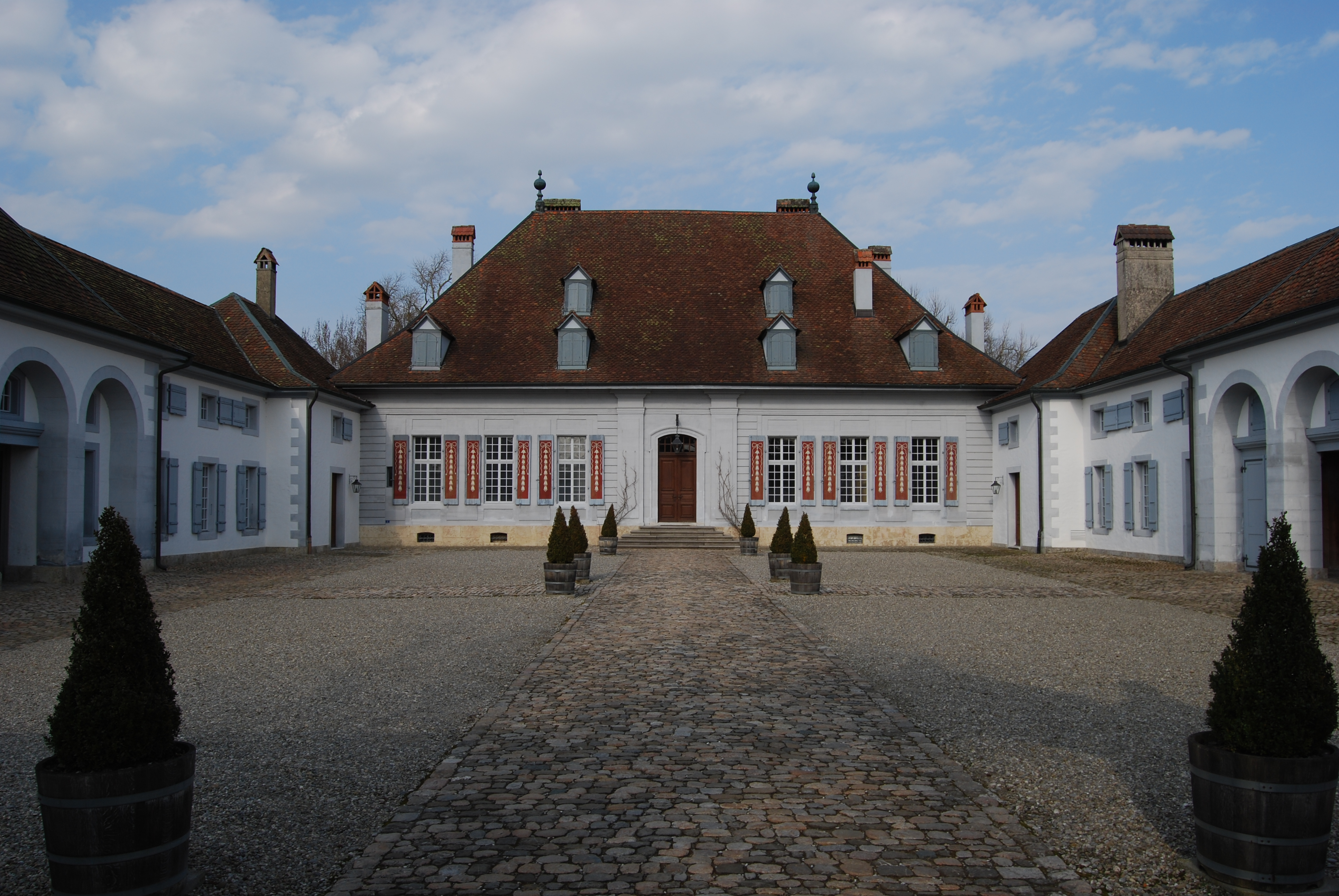
Courtyard of Thunstetten Castle

Thunstetten Castle is a castle in the municipality of Thunstetten of the Canton of Bern in Switzerland. It is a Swiss heritage site of national significance.

== See also ==
- List of castles in Switzerland
