= Niederösch =

- Former municipality
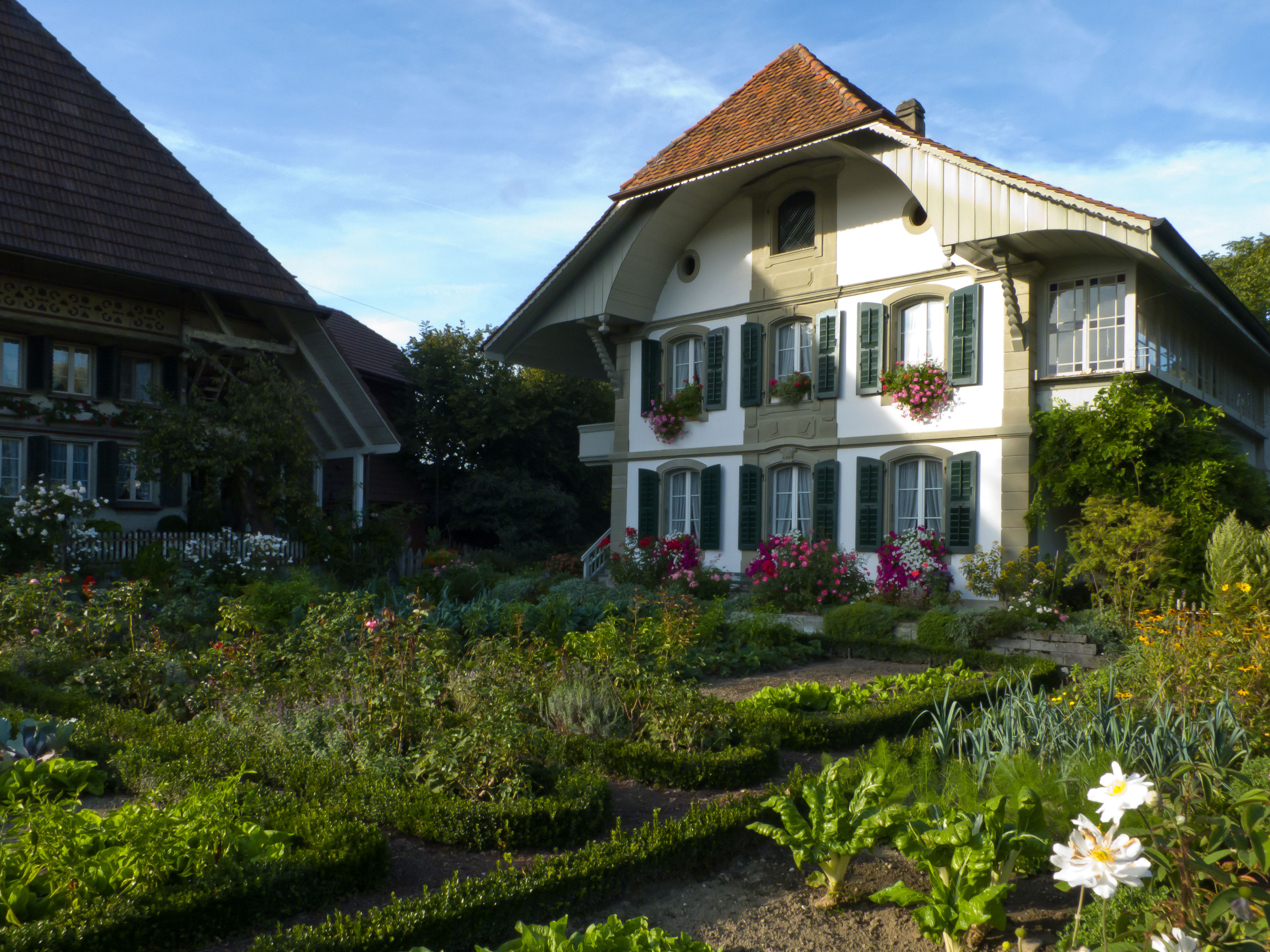
- Stöckli house in Niederösch village

- Flag Coat of arms
- Location of Niederösch
- Location within Switzerland Location within Canton of Bern
- Coordinates: 47°7′N 7°37′E
- Country: Switzerland
- Canton: Bern
- District: Emmental

Area
  - Total: 4.6 km^{2} (1.8 sq mi)
- Elevation: 485 m (1,591 ft)

Population (Dec 2014)
  - Total: 237
  - Density: 52/km^{2} (130/sq mi)
- Time zone: UTC+01:00 (CET)
  - Summer (DST): UTC+02:00 (CEST)
- Postal code: 3424
- SFOS number: 417
- ISO 3166 code: CH-BE
- Surrounded by: Alchenstorf, Koppigen, Oberösch, Rumendingen, Utzenstorf
- Website: www.ersigen.ch

Niederösch is a former municipality in the administrative district of Emmental in the canton of Bern in Switzerland. On 1 January 2016, the former municipalities of Oberösch and Niederösch merged into Ersigen.

== History ==
Aerial view from 300 m by Walter Mittelholzer (1930)

Niederösch is first mentioned in 886 as Osse and is mentioned in 1310 as villa Öschge inferioris. The municipality was originally part of the village of Ösch, but eventually the two halves of the village became independent of each other.

The oldest trace of a settlement in the area is a late-Bronze Age grave in Bühlen. In 886 the Abbey of St. Gall owned property in both Niederösch and Oberösch. In 994, this land was given to Selz Abbey in Alsace. During the 13th and 14th centuries the Kyburg counts also owned land in the village, which they gave as a fief to their vassals. In 1320, Albrecht of Thorberg, a Kyburg vassal, sold land in Niederösch, but retained the local forest and the low court. Later, Albrecht sold the forest and court to the Lords of Rohrmoos. In 1423 Verena of Rohrmoos sold the lower court and the forest to Burgdorf. The city merged the courts of Niederösch, Oberösch, Rumendingen and Bickigen and placed them under the bailiwick of Grasswil. Niederösch has always been a part of the parish of Kirchberg. In 1803 it became part of the district of Burgdorf.

== Geography ==
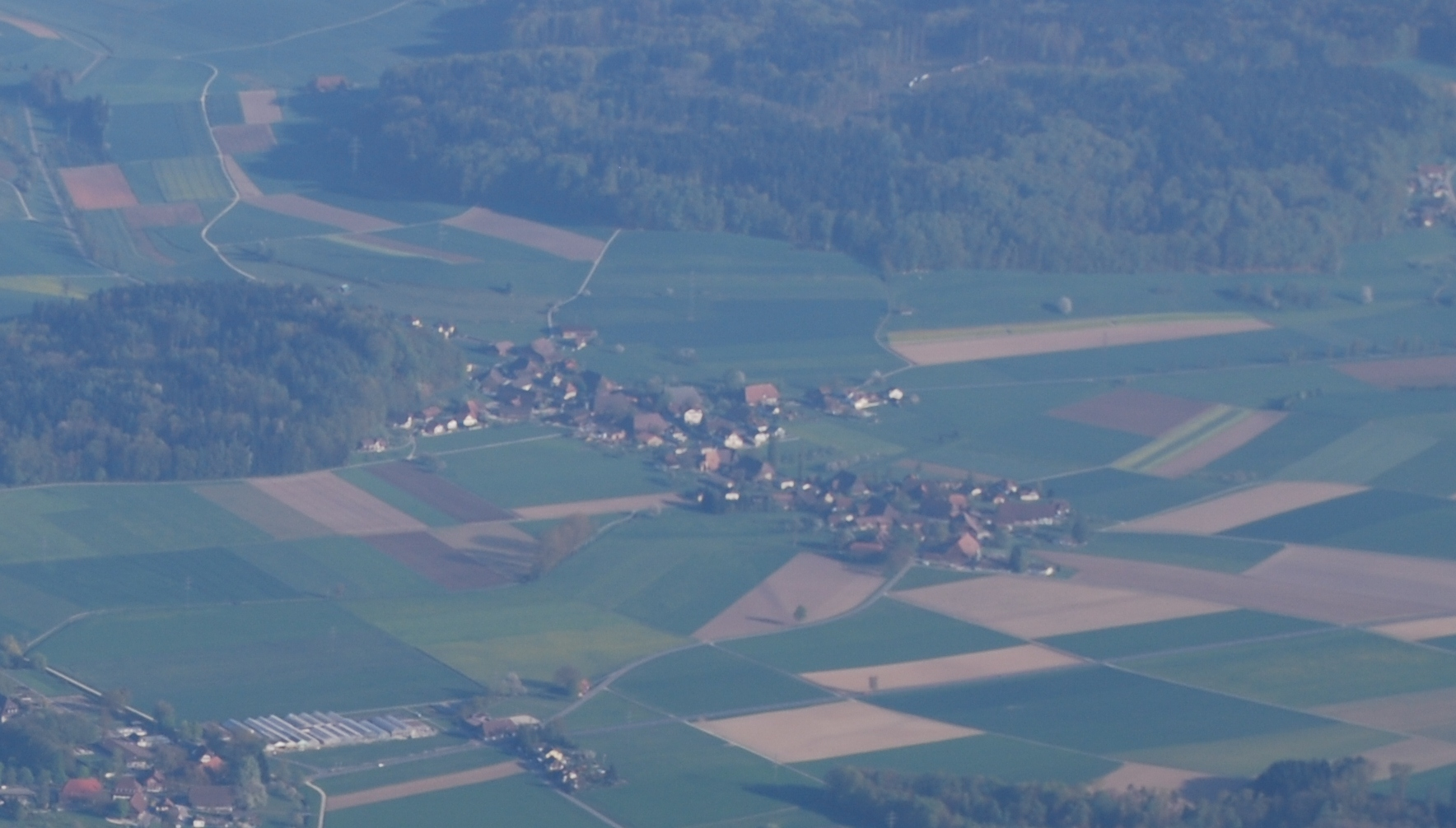
Niederösch village

Niederösch has an area of 4.63 km^{2} (1.79 mi^{2}). Of this area, 3.16 km^{2} (1.22 mi^{2}) or 68.3% is used for agricultural purposes, while 1.23 km^{2} (0.47 mi^{2}) or 26.6% is forested. Of the rest of the land, 0.23 km^{2} (0.089 mi^{2}) or 5.0% is settled (buildings or roads).

Of the built up area, housing and buildings made up 3.0% and transportation infrastructure made up 1.7%. Out of the forested land, all of the forested land area is covered with heavy forests. Of the agricultural land, 54.6% is used for growing crops and 12.7% is pastures.

Niederösch consists of the Straßendorf (a village that lies almost entirely along a single road) of Ober- (Upper Village) and Unterdorf (Lower Village) on the Ösch river and the farm Rychebrunne.

On 31 December 2009 Amtsbezirk Burgdorf, the municipality's former district, was dissolved. On the following day, 1 January 2010, it joined the newly created Verwaltungskreis Emmental.

== Coat of arms ==
The blazon of the municipal coat of arms is Azure an Ash Tree Or issuant from a Mount of 3 Coupeaux Vert. The ash tree (German: Esche) makes this an example of canting arms.

== Demographics ==
Niederösch had a population (as of 2014) of 237. As of 2010, 1.7% of the population are resident foreign nationals. Over the last 10 years (2000–2010) the population has changed at a rate of 16.3%. Migration accounted for 10.6%, while births and deaths accounted for 10.1%.

Most of the population (as of 2000) speaks German (204 or 97.1%) as their first language, French is the second most common (3 or 1.4%) and Italian is the third (2 or 1.0%).

As of 2008, the population was 47.3% male and 52.7% female. The population was made up of 114 Swiss men (47.3% of the population) and (0.0%) non-Swiss men. There were 123 Swiss women (51.0%) and 4 (1.7%) non-Swiss women. Of the population in the municipality, 83 or about 39.5% were born in Niederösch and lived there in 2000. There were 89 or 42.4% who were born in the same canton, while 31 or 14.8% were born somewhere else in Switzerland, and 4 or 1.9% were born outside of Switzerland.

As of 2010, children and teenagers (0–19 years old) make up 25.3% of the population, while adults (20–64 years old) make up 60.6% and seniors (over 64 years old) make up 14.1%.

As of 2000, there were 80 people who were single and never married in the municipality. There were 111 married individuals, 15 widows or widowers and 4 individuals who are divorced.

As of 2000, there were 25 households that consist of only one person and 8 households with five or more people. In 2000, a total of 75 apartments (77.3% of the total) were permanently occupied, while 19 apartments (19.6%) were seasonally occupied and 3 apartments (3.1%) were empty. The vacancy rate for the municipality, in 2011, was 5.56%.

The historical population is given in the following chart:

== Heritage sites of national significance ==
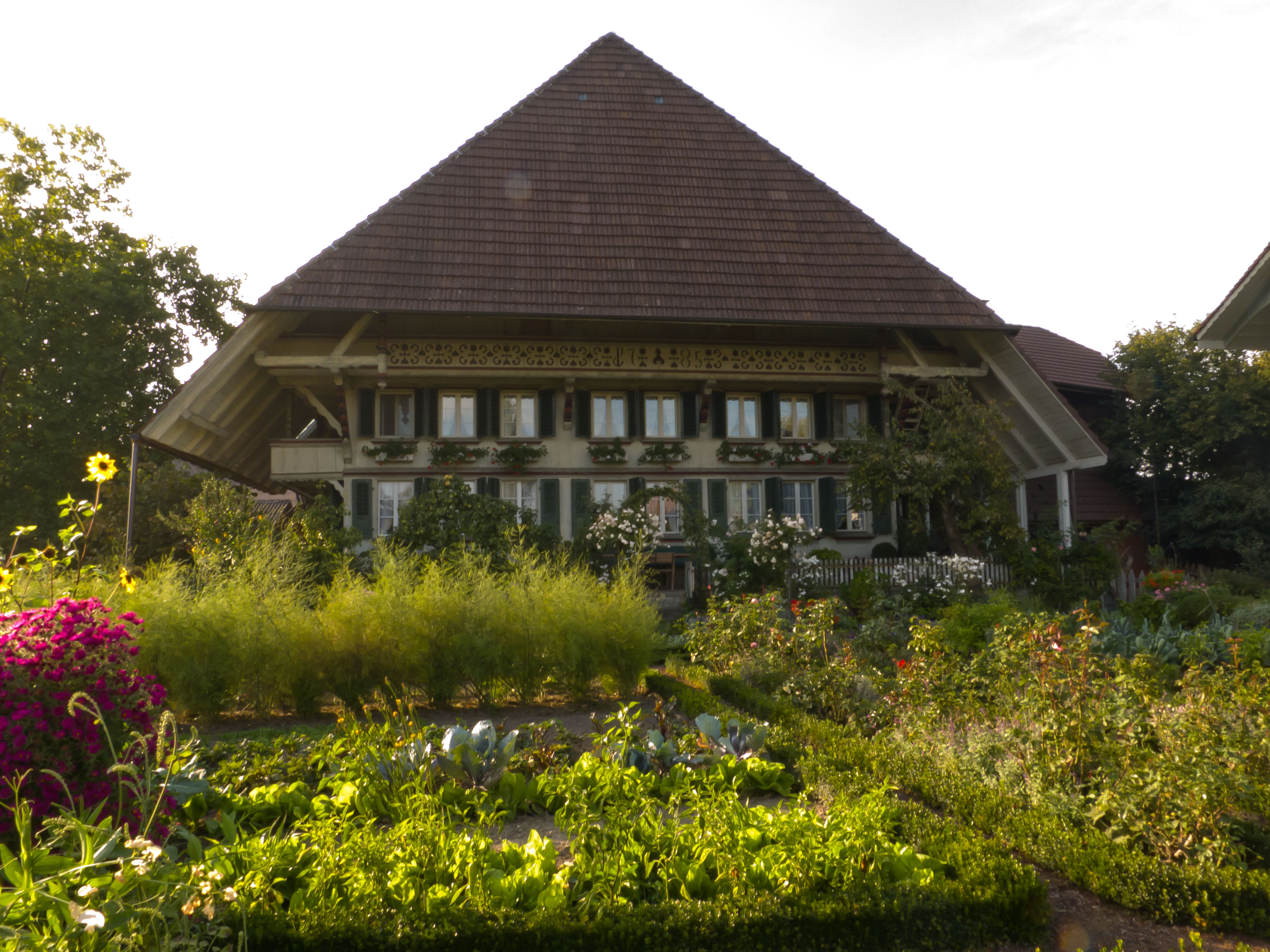
The Gehöft house

The Gehöft house at Unterdorf 9, 10 is listed as a Swiss heritage site of national significance. The entire village of Niederösch is part of the Inventory of Swiss Heritage Sites.

== Politics ==
In the 2011 federal election the most popular party was the Federal Democratic Union of Switzerland (EDU) which received 6% of the vote. The next three most popular parties were the Liberal Party of Switzerland (LPS) (0%), the Liberal Party of Switzerland (LPS) (0%) and the Liberal Party of Switzerland (LPS) (0%).

== Economy ==
As of 2011, Niederösch had an unemployment rate of 0%. As of 2008, there were a total of 73 people employed in the municipality. Of these, there were 50 people employed in the primary economic sector and about 17 businesses involved in this sector. 4 people were employed in the secondary sector and there were 3 businesses in this sector. 19 people were employed in the tertiary sector, with 3 businesses in this sector.

In 2008 there were a total of 49 full-time equivalent jobs. The number of jobs in the primary sector was 31, all of which were in agriculture. The number of jobs in the secondary sector was 4 of which 3 were in manufacturing and 1 was in construction. The number of jobs in the tertiary sector was 14. In the tertiary sector; 7 were in wholesale or retail sales or the repair of motor vehicles and 7 were in a hotel or restaurant.

In 2000, there were 12 workers who commuted into the municipality and 58 workers who commuted away. The municipality is a net exporter of workers, with about 4.8 workers leaving the municipality for every one entering. Of the working population, 9.3% used public transportation to get to work, and 40.7% used a private car.

== Religion ==
From the 2000 census, 10 or 4.8% were Roman Catholic, while 182 or 86.7% belonged to the Swiss Reformed Church. Of the rest of the population, there was 1 individual who belongs to the Christian Catholic Church, and there were 18 individuals (or about 8.57% of the population) who belonged to another Christian church. 8 (or about 3.81% of the population) belonged to no church, are agnostic or atheist.

== Education ==
In Niederösch about 90 or (42.9%) of the population have completed non-mandatory upper secondary education, and 28 or (13.3%) have completed additional higher education (either university or a Fachhochschule). Of the 28 who completed tertiary schooling, 82.1% were Swiss men, 17.9% were Swiss women.

The Canton of Bern school system provides one year of non-obligatory Kindergarten, followed by six years of Primary school. This is followed by three years of obligatory lower Secondary school where the students are separated according to ability and aptitude. Following the lower Secondary students may attend additional schooling or they may enter an apprenticeship.

During the 2010–11 school year, there were a total of 32 students attending classes in Niederösch. There was one kindergarten class with a total of 12 students in the municipality. The municipality had one primary class and 20 students. Of the primary students, 10.0% were permanent or temporary residents of Switzerland (not citizens).

As of 2000, there were 4 students in Niederösch who came from another municipality, while 12 residents attended schools outside the municipality.
