= Ersigen =

- Municipality
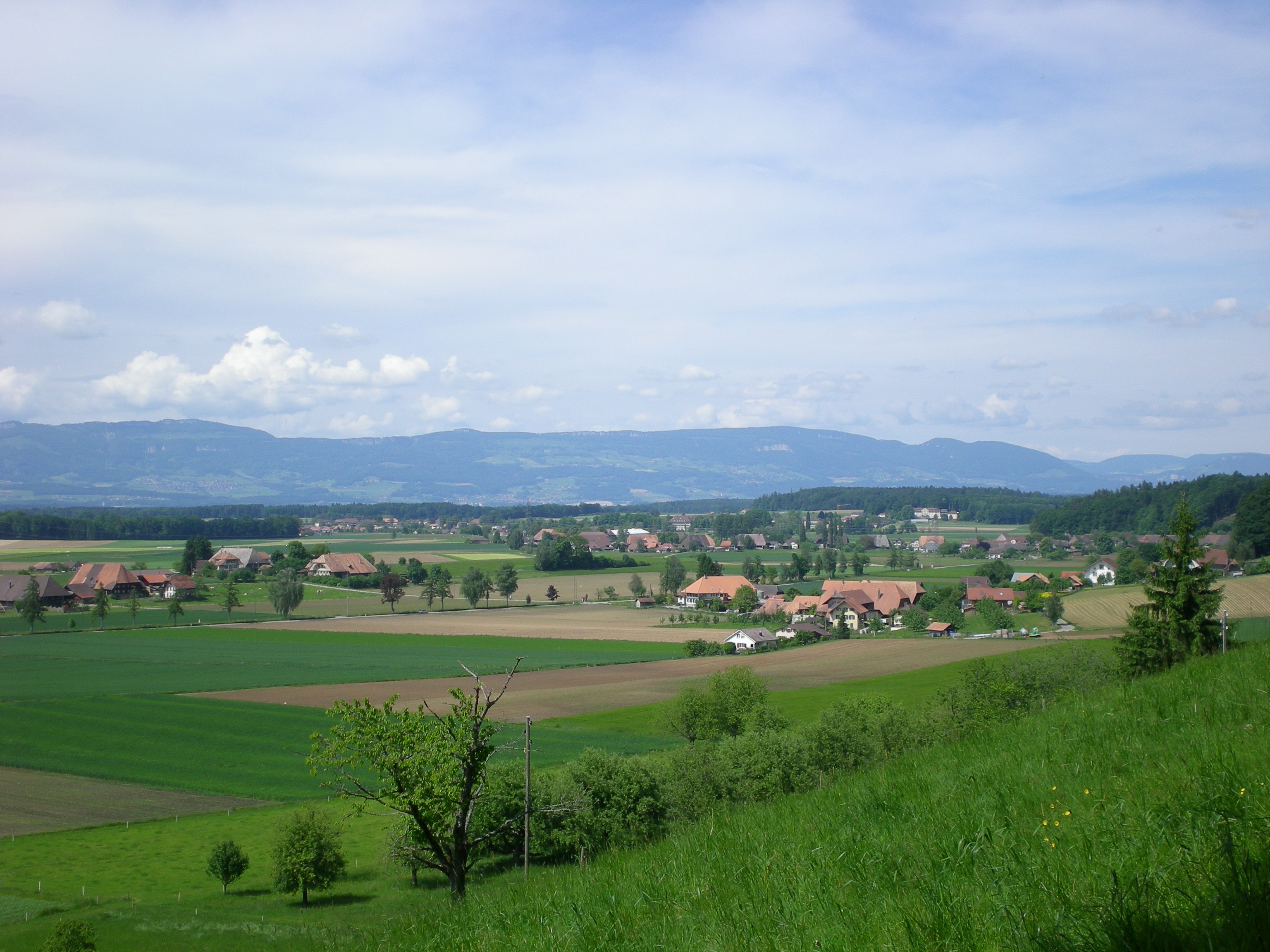
- Ersigen village seen from Rudswil

- Flag Coat of arms
- Location of Ersigen
- Location within Switzerland Location within Canton of Bern
- Coordinates: 47°6′N 7°36′E
- Country: Switzerland
- Canton: Bern
- District: Emmental

Government
  - Executive: Gemeinderat with 7 members
  - Mayor: Gemeindepräsident(in); Urs Wälchli (as of 2026)

Area
  - Total: 8.8 km^{2} (3.4 sq mi)
- Elevation: 500 m (1,600 ft)

Population (December 2020)
  - Total: 2,063
  - Density: 230/km^{2} (610/sq mi)
- Time zone: UTC+01:00 (CET)
  - Summer (DST): UTC+02:00 (CEST)
- Postal code: 3423
- SFOS number: 405
- ISO 3166 code: CH-BE
- Surrounded by: Kirchberg, Oberösch, Rumendingen, Utzenstorf, Wynigen
- Website: www.ersigen.ch

Ersigen is a municipality in the administrative district of Emmental in the canton of Bern in Switzerland. On 1 January 2016, the former municipalities of Oberösch and Niederösch merged into Ersigen.

Aerial view by Walter Mittelholzer (1923)

== History ==
Based on a few, individual finds the Ersigen area was settled during the Neolithic era. There is a Hallstatt burial mound in Allmendwald and a Roman storehouse in Murrain.

The town is first mentioned in 1112 as Ergisingen. Between 1112 and 1418 there was a line of Ministerialis (unfree knights) from Ersigen, who served the Zähringen and Kyburg families. This family was, most likely, the second largest land owner (after the monasteries) in Ersigen. However, in 1367 they sold their holdings to Peter von Thorberg. In 1375 the village was likely attacked by the Gugler army. A large graveyard is the only evidence of this attack. In 1397 Thorburg gave his property, woods and the rights to low justice in Ersigen to the Thorberg Carthusian monastery. The rights to high justice were held by the Vogtei of Wangen. After 1528 the rights to low justice were held by the Thorberg vogt.

By 1481 there was a daughter chapel in Ersigen, which was under the Parish church at Kirchberg. The chapel was abandoned in 1528, and very little remains. In 1640 the village was involved in the construction and upkeep of the Emmen bridge as well as the Bern-Zürich road.

In 1803, following the Act of Mediation, Ersigen became part of the district of Burgdorf. In 1824 a cheesemaker set up shop in Ersigen. In 1836 Ersigen received the Thorbergerwald, the forests formerly owned by the Thorberg family, from the canton. During the 20th century the villages of Ober- and Niederösch joined Ersigen. The village remained isolated until 1965, when the A1 motorway was built, which provided easy access to Ersigen. This led to the construction of several new housing areas.

During the first half of the 20th century, Bad Rudswil in Ersigen was a well-known medicinal thermal bath. Later in the 20th century the baths closed, leaving most of the village employed in farming or light industry.

=== Niederösch ===
Niederösch is first mentioned in 886 as Osse and is mentioned in 1310 as villa Öschge inferioris. The municipality was originally part of the village of Ösch, but eventually the two halves of the village became independent of each other.

The oldest trace of a settlement in the area is a late-Bronze Age grave in Bühlen. In 886 the Abbey of St. Gall owned property in both Niederösch and Oberösch. In 994, this land was given to Selz Abbey in Alsace. During the 13th and 14th centuries the Kyburg counts also owned land in the village, which they gave as a fief to their vassals. In 1320, Albrecht of Thorberg, a Kyburg vassal, sold land in Niederösch, but retained the local forest and the low court. Later, Albrecht sold the forest and court to the Lords of Rohrmoos. In 1423 Verena of Rohrmoos sold the lower court and the forest to Burgdorf. The city merged the courts of Niederösch, Oberösch, Rumendingen and Bickigen and placed them under the bailiwick of Grasswil. Niederösch has always been a part of the parish of Kirchberg. In 1803 it became part of the district of Burgdorf.

=== Oberösch ===
Oberösch is first mentioned in 886 as Osse. It is mentioned again in 1310 as Oeschge superioris. The municipality was originally part of the village of Ösch, but eventually the two halves of the village became independent of each other.

In 1423, Burgdorf acquired one half of the low court of Oberösch from Verena von Rohrmoos. Later, in the 16th century, Burgdorf bought the other half of the court from Thorberg Chapterhouse. They then combined the two halves and merged the court of Oberösch with the court of Niederösch. Oberösch shared pastures with Ersigen and Rudswil (now part of Ersigen). In 1467, Burgdorf granted the village the right to harvest timber in the Reiteneggwald. In 1525 this was expanded to include the Kriegholz and Hinterholz forests. Throughout its history it has belonged to the parish of Kirchberg.

Agriculture has always dominated the local economy and in 2005 93% of the jobs in the municipality were in agriculture. However, many residents commute to jobs in neighboring towns. Oberösch and Niederösch form a single school district. The school house is located in Niederösch.

== Geography ==
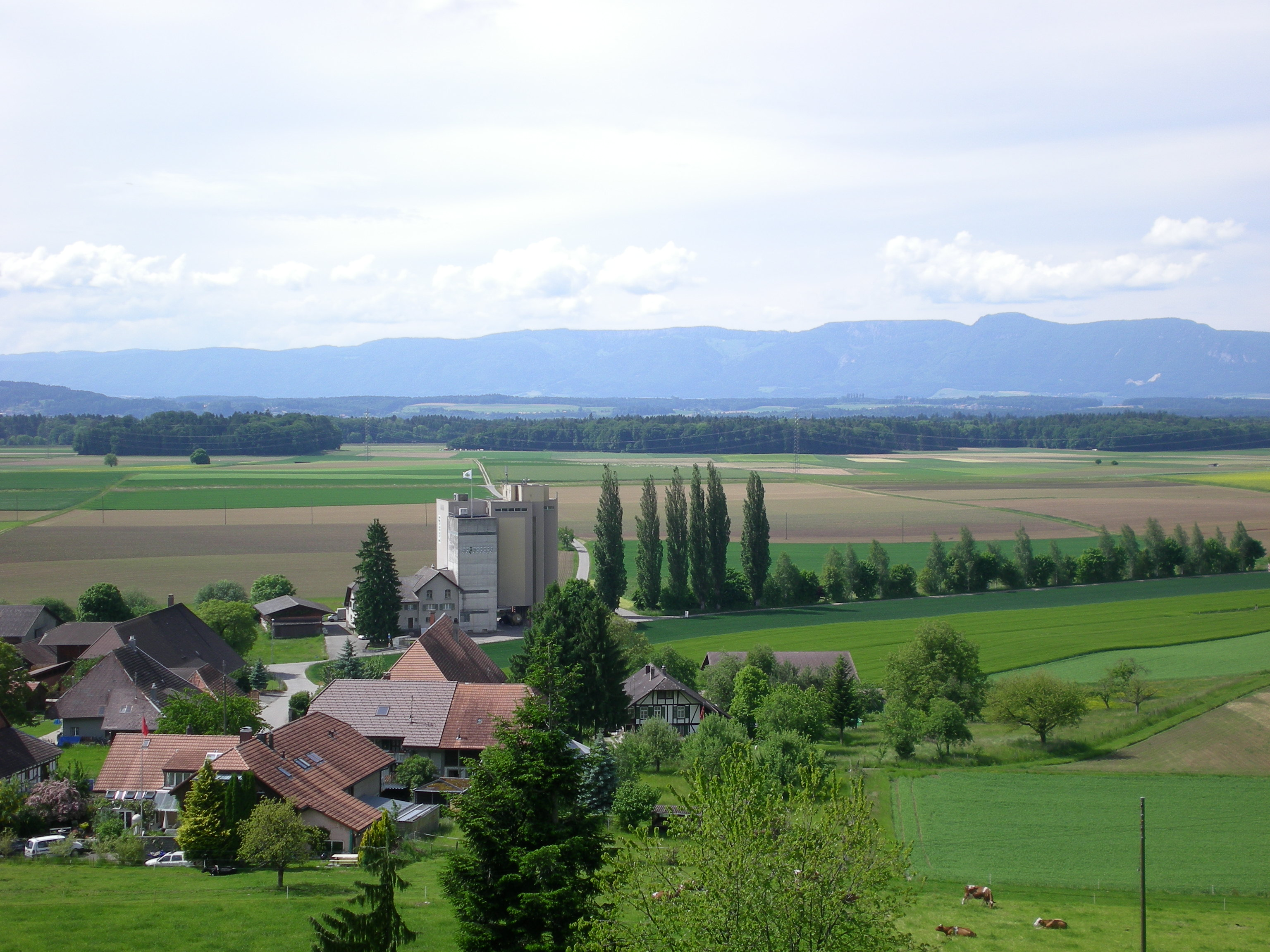
Fields outside Ersigen

Ersigen has an area of 15.46 km^{2} (5.97 sq mi). Before the 2016 merger it had an area of 8.7 km^{2} (3.4 mi^{2}). Of this area, 5.12 km^{2} (1.98 mi^{2}) or 58.9% is used for agricultural purposes, while 2.77 km^{2} (1.07 mi^{2}) or 31.8% is forested. Of the rest of the land, 0.83 km^{2} (0.32 mi^{2}) or 9.5% is settled (buildings or roads), 0.01 km^{2} (2.5 acres) or 0.1% is either rivers or lakes and 0.01 km^{2} (2.5 acres) or 0.1% is unproductive land.

Of the built up area, housing and buildings made up 6.1% and transportation infrastructure made up 2.1%. Out of the forested land, all of the forested land area is covered with heavy forests. Of the agricultural land, 48.5% is used for growing crops and 8.9% is pastures, while 1.5% is used for orchards or vine crops. All the water in the municipality is flowing water.

It consists of the linear village of Ersigen (divided into Oberdorf and Unterdorf along the Ösch), the neighborhood of Rudswil and scattered farm houses.

On 31 December 2009 Amtsbezirk Burgdorf, the municipality's former district, was dissolved. On the following day, 1 January 2010, it joined the newly created Verwaltungskreis Emmental.

== Coat of arms ==
The blazon of the municipal coat of arms is Or two Bends Gules.

== Demographics ==
Ersigen has a population (as of December 2020) of 2,063. As of 2010, 3.2% of the population are resident foreign nationals. Over the last 10 years (2000-2010) the population has changed at a rate of 8.1%. Migration accounted for 7.8%, while births and deaths accounted for -1%.

Most of the population (as of 2000) speaks German (1,420 or 95.8%) as their first language, Serbo-Croatian is the second most common (15 or 1.0%) and Albanian is the third (12 or 0.8%). There are 6 people who speak French, 5 people who speak Italian and 1 person who speaks Romansh.

As of 2008, the population was 50.5% male and 49.5% female. The population was made up of 771 Swiss men (48.9% of the population) and 25 (1.6%) non-Swiss men. There were 755 Swiss women (47.9%) and 25 (1.6%) non-Swiss women. Of the population in the municipality, 514 or about 34.7% were born in Ersigen and lived there in 2000. There were 621 or 41.9% who were born in the same canton, while 197 or 13.3% were born somewhere else in Switzerland, and 100 or 6.7% were born outside of Switzerland.

As of 2010, children and teenagers (0–19 years old) make up 22% of the population, while adults (20–64 years old) make up 60.3% and seniors (over 64 years old) make up 17.7%.

As of 2000, there were 590 people who were single and never married in the municipality. There were 767 married individuals, 77 widows or widowers and 49 individuals who are divorced.

As of 2000, there were 140 households that consist of only one person and 48 households with five or more people. In 2000, a total of 562 apartments (92.7% of the total) were permanently occupied, while 23 apartments (3.8%) were seasonally occupied and 21 apartments (3.5%) were empty. As of 2010, the construction rate of new housing units was 7.6 new units per 1000 residents. The vacancy rate for the municipality, in 2011, was 0.14%.

The historical population is given in the following chart:

== Heritage sites of national significance ==
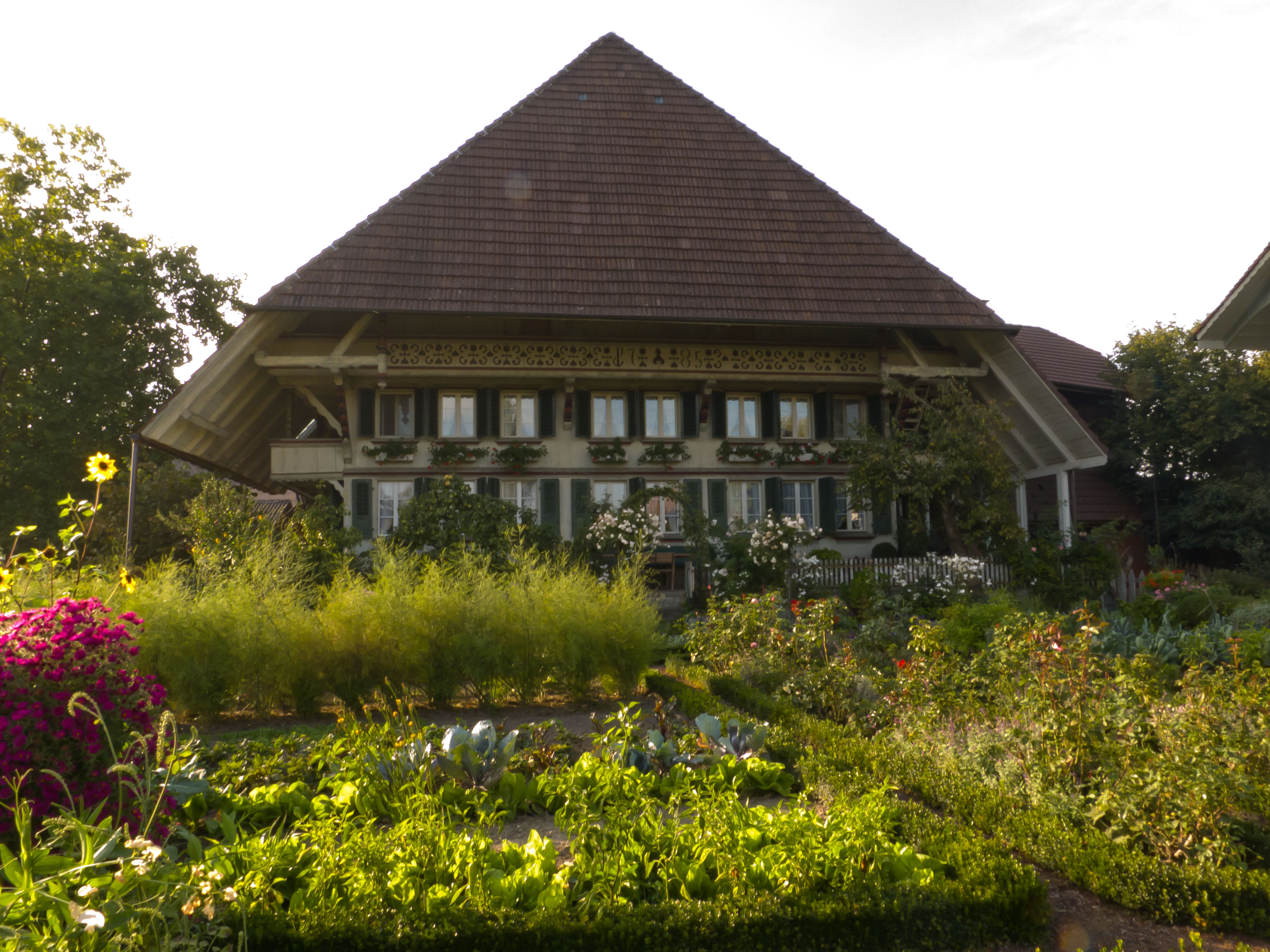
The Gehöft house

The Gehöft house at Unterdorf 9, 10 is listed as a Swiss heritage site of national significance. The entire village of Niederösch and the hamlet of Oberösch are part of the Inventory of Swiss Heritage Sites.

== Politics ==
In the 2011 federal election the most popular party was the SVP which received 39.3% of the vote. The next three most popular parties were the BDP Party (19.9%), the SPS (12.6%) and the FDP (8.2%). In the federal election, a total of 871 votes were cast, and the voter turnout was 56.5%.

== Economy ==
As of 2011, Ersigen had an unemployment rate of 1.47%. As of 2008, there were a total of 383 people employed in the municipality. Of these, there were 77 people employed in the primary economic sector and about 29 businesses involved in this sector. 97 people were employed in the secondary sector and there were 16 businesses in this sector. 209 people were employed in the tertiary sector, with 43 businesses in this sector.

In 2008 there were a total of 305 full-time equivalent jobs. The number of jobs in the primary sector was 50, all of which were in agriculture. The number of jobs in the secondary sector was 86 of which 40 or (46.5%) were in manufacturing and 46 (53.5%) were in construction. The number of jobs in the tertiary sector was 169. In the tertiary sector; 73 or 43.2% were in wholesale or retail sales or the repair of motor vehicles, 5 or 3.0% were in the movement and storage of goods, 46 or 27.2% were in a hotel or restaurant, 6 or 3.6% were in the information industry, 8 or 4.7% were technical professionals or scientists, 2 or 1.2% were in education and 10 or 5.9% were in health care.

In 2000, there were 174 workers who commuted into the municipality and 534 workers who commuted away. The municipality is a net exporter of workers, with about 3.1 workers leaving the municipality for every one entering. Of the working population, 9.2% used public transportation to get to work, and 55.4% used a private car.

== Religion ==
From the 2000 census, 102 or 6.9% were Roman Catholic, while 1,180 or 79.6% belonged to the Swiss Reformed Church. Of the rest of the population, there were 5 members of an Orthodox church (or about 0.34% of the population), there were 2 individuals (or about 0.13% of the population) who belonged to the Christian Catholic Church, and there were 126 individuals (or about 8.50% of the population) who belonged to another Christian church. There was 1 individual who was Jewish, and 22 (or about 1.48% of the population) who were Islamic. There were 9 individuals who were Hindu and 3 individuals who belonged to another church. 55 (or about 3.71% of the population) belonged to no church, are agnostic or atheist, and 41 individuals (or about 2.76% of the population) did not answer the question.

== Education ==
In Ersigen about 611 or (41.2%) of the population have completed non-mandatory upper secondary education, and 200 or (13.5%) have completed additional higher education (either university or a Fachhochschule). Of the 200 who completed tertiary schooling, 77.5% were Swiss men, 18.5% were Swiss women.

The Canton of Bern school system provides one year of non-obligatory Kindergarten, followed by six years of Primary school. This is followed by three years of obligatory lower Secondary school where the students are separated according to ability and aptitude. Following the lower Secondary students may attend additional schooling or they may enter an apprenticeship.

During the 2009-10 school year, there were a total of 170 students attending classes in Ersigen. There were 2 kindergarten classes with a total of 37 students in the municipality. Of the kindergarten students, 2.7% were permanent or temporary residents of Switzerland (not citizens) and 5.4% have a different mother language than the classroom language. The municipality had 6 primary classes and 108 students. Of the primary students, and 6.5% have a different mother language than the classroom language. During the same year, there was one lower secondary class with a total of 25 students. There were 8.0% who were permanent or temporary residents of Switzerland (not citizens).

As of 2000, there were 22 students in Ersigen who came from another municipality, while 170 residents attended schools outside the municipality.
