= Schwandner =

Schwandner or Schwantner (to field and place name Schwand/Schwanden, where the forest was swung, e.g. wasted by fire) is a German language habitational surname. Notable people with the name include:

- Ernst-Ludwig Schwandner (1938–2021), German architectural historian and classical archaeologist
- Gerd Schwandner (born 1951), German surgeon and former politician

== Schwantner ==
- Joseph Schwantner (born 1943), American composer and educator

== See also ==
- Schwandt
