= Schwender =

Schwender is a German surname. Notable people with the surname include:

- Herbert Schwender (1912–1944), German military officer
- John D. Schwender, American college football coach

== See also ==
- Schwende (disambiguation)
