= Jana Haas =

German writer

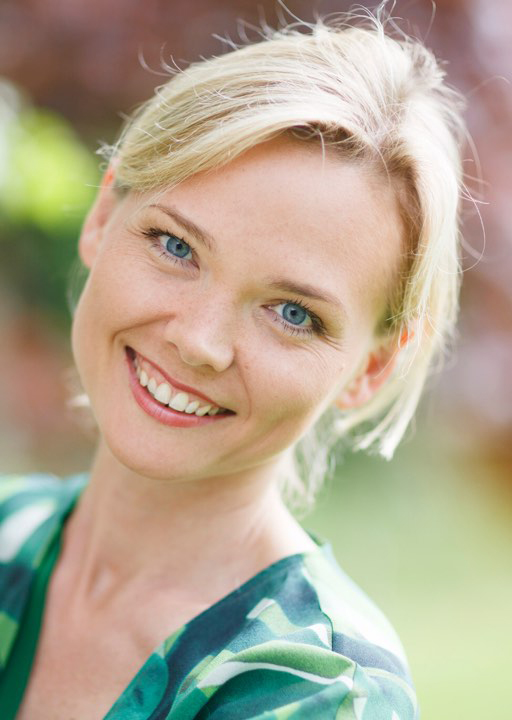
- Haas in 2016
- Born: 27 March 1979 (age 47); Zelinograd, Kazakh SSR, Soviet Union
- Occupation: Writer
- Website: Personal website

Jana Haas (née Butakova; born 27 March 1979 in Zelinograd, Kazakh SSR, Soviet Union) is a German writer who describes herself as a medium and to be able to communicate with the deceased and other spiritual beings.

== Life ==
Haas was born in the Soviet Union. Her ancestors on her mother's side are Volga Germans. She attended elementary school in Pavlodar, and in 1992 she moved with her family to Germany near Bonn. After finishing secondary school, she attended the Higher Commercial School and then trained as a real estate agent. Today she lives in Herdwangen-Schönach near Lake Constance.

According to her own statements she has been clairvoyant since her childhood. At the age of six she reports having had her first conscious near-death experience at a lake of the Irtysch, which gave her images and experiences of a world beyond. In her childhood she claims to have seen mainly near-earth beings, such as deceased people. She claims that as her mental and spiritual development progressed, she was increasingly able to recognise the human aura and higher beings full of light. According to her, today she is able to see the "energetic" worlds, such as heaven, as well as God and countless beings, such as angels and nature beings, clearly, to describe them exactly and to communicate with them.

On 11 January 2008 Haas was a guest on the SWR programme Nachtcafé.

In 2010 she founded the "Jana Haas - Kinderhilfe in Russland e.V." to give disabled children a perspective.

== Work ==
Haas has been running the Cosmogetic Institute in Herdwangen-Schönach since autumn 2005, where she conducts training courses, seminars and workshops. She explains that it is her endeavour to educate people about the spiritual connections and to give them an open and undogmatic access to their own spirituality.

== Books ==
- mit Wulfing von Rohr: Engel und die neue Zeit. Heilwerden mit den lichten Helfern. Ullstein, Berlin 2008, ISBN 978-3-548-74420-9.
- Die Engelkarten. Engel in der neuen Zeit. Allegria 2008, ISBN 978-3-7934-2150-4.
- Heilung mit der Kraft der Engel. Das Praxisbuch zum energetischen Heilen von Körper und Seele. Knaur, München 2009, ISBN 978-3-426-65633-4.
- Erzengel und das neue Zeitalter. Ihre Kraft für persönliche Beziehungen und Gesundheit nutzen. Knaur, München 2009, ISBN 978-3-426-65638-9.
- Mit den Engeln durch das Jahr. 365 himmlische Botschaften. Knaur, München 2009, ISBN 978-3-426-87435-6.
- Schutzengel. Wie uns die himmlischen Begleiter zu Seite stehen. Knaur, München 2010, ISBN 978-3-426-65667-9.
- Fragen an Gott und die Engel. Ullstein, Berlin 2011, ISBN 978-3-548-74532-9.
- Jenseitige Welten. Knaur, München 2012, ISBN 978-3-426-65692-1.
- mit Werner Wider: Himmlisches Wissen. Ein erfülltes Leben mit Hilfe der Engel. Knaur, München 2013, ISBN 978-3-426-65731-7.
- Der Seelenplan. Was unser Schicksal bestimmt. Trinity, München 2014, ISBN 978-3-955-50060-3.
- Heilen mit der göttlichen Kraft. Aktiviere deine inneren Heilkräfte mit Cosmogetic Healing. Trinity, München 2015, ISBN 978-3-955-50119-8.
- Das Geheimnis einer erfüllten Partnerschaft: Chancen erkennen und leben. Trinity, München 2016, ISBN 978-3-955-50162-4.

Buchbeiträge:

- Unsere Reise zum ewigen Licht. In Eduard Maass (Hrsg.): Das Buch vom Abschied. Knaur, München 2012, ISBN 978-3-426-87631-2.

== DVDs ==
- Exklusives Interview: Engel, Hellsichtigkeit und wie wir uns entwickeln können DVD, Neue Weltsicht, Potsdam 2011.
- Der Schutzengel – Begleitung im Leben und im Jenseits DVD, Neue Weltsicht, Potsdam 2011.
- Workshop: Die Hilfe der lichten Helfer 2 DVD, Neue Weltsicht, Potsdam 2012.
- Gott und seine geistigen Helfer DVD, Neue Weltsicht, Potsdam 2012.
- Kraftorte in Kalifornien – eine Naturwesenreise mit Jana Haas DVD, Neue Weltsicht, Potsdam 2013.
