= Oberösch =

- Former municipality
- Flag Coat of arms
- Location of Oberösch
- Location within Switzerland Location within Canton of Bern
- Coordinates: 47°7′N 7°37′E
- Country: Switzerland
- Canton: Bern
- District: Emmental

Area
  - Total: 2.1 km^{2} (0.81 sq mi)
- Elevation: 489 m (1,604 ft)

Population (Dec 2014)
  - Total: 109
  - Density: 52/km^{2} (130/sq mi)
- Time zone: UTC+01:00 (CET)
  - Summer (DST): UTC+02:00 (CEST)
- Postal code: 3424
- SFOS number: 419
- ISO 3166 code: CH-BE
- Surrounded by: Ersigen, Niederösch, Rumendingen, Utzenstorf
- Website: www.ersigen.ch

Oberösch is a former municipality in the administrative district of Emmental in the canton of Bern in Switzerland. On 1 January 2016, the former municipalities of Oberösch and Niederösch merged into Ersigen.

== History ==
Oberösch is first mentioned in 886 as Osse. It is mentioned again in 1310 as Oeschge superioris. The municipality was originally part of the village of Ösch, but eventually the two halves of the village became independent of each other.

In 1423, Burgdorf acquired one half of the low court of Oberösch from Verena von Rohrmoos. Later, in the 16th century, Burgdorf bought the other half of the court from Thorberg Chapterhouse. They then combined the two halves and merged the court of Oberösch with the court of Niederösch. Oberösch shared pastures with Ersigen and Rudswil (now part of Ersigen). In 1467, Burgdorf granted the village the right to harvest timber in the Reiteneggwald. In 1525 this was expanded to include the Kriegholz and Hinterholz forests. Throughout its history it has belonged to the parish of Kirchberg.

Agriculture has always dominated the local economy and in 2005 93% of the jobs in the municipality were in agriculture. However, many residents commute to jobs in neighboring towns. Oberösch and Niederösch form a single school district. The school house is located in Niederösch.

== Geography ==
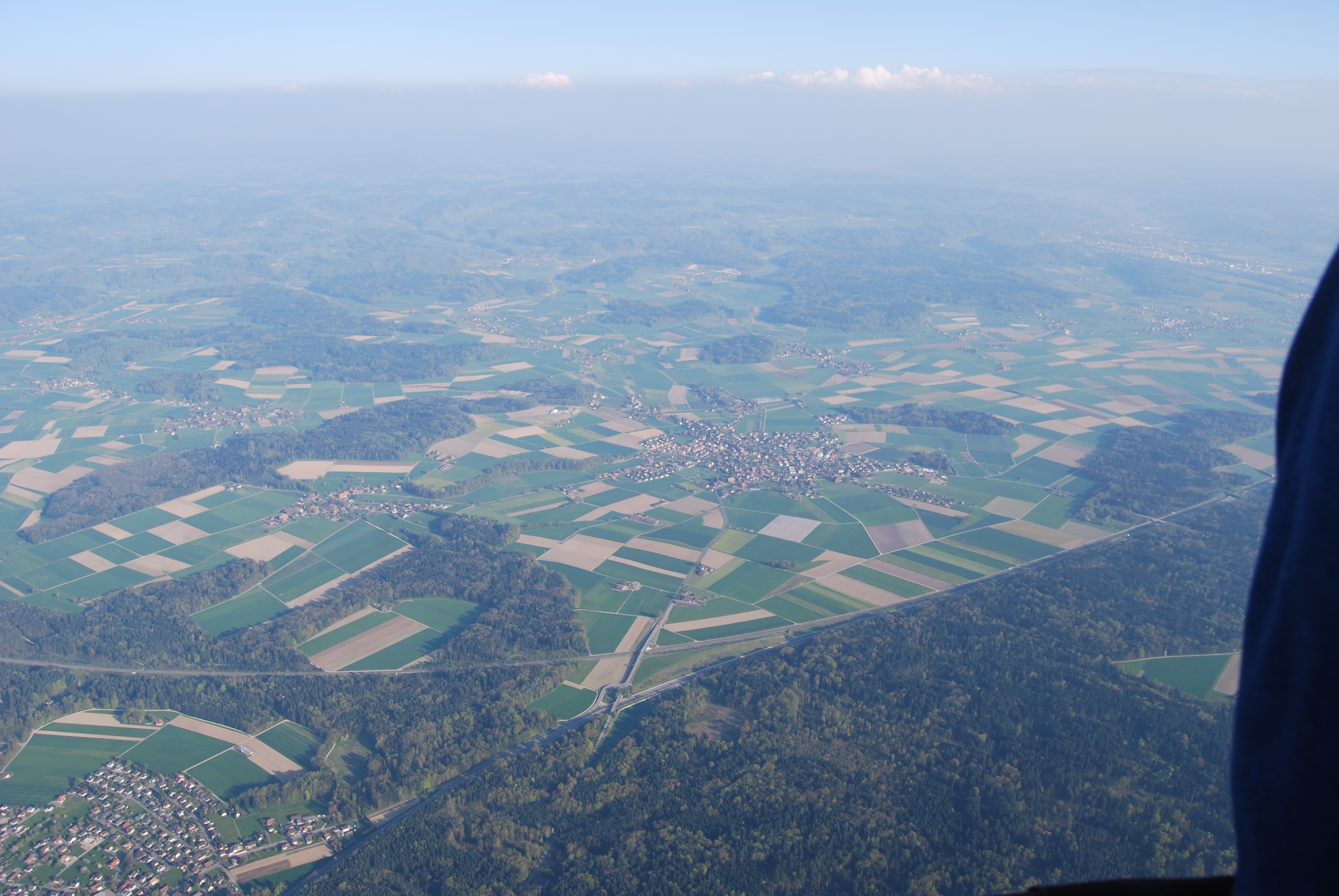
Aerial view of the Koppigen area. Oberösch and Niederösch are visible behind and to the right of Koppigen

Oberösch is located along the Ösch River north of Burgdorf.

Oberösch had an area of 2.15 km^{2} (0.83 mi^{2}). Of this area, 1.28 km^{2} (0.49 mi^{2}) or 59.5% is used for agricultural purposes, while 0.73 km^{2} (0.28 mi^{2}) or 34.0% is forested. Of the rest of the land, 0.11 km^{2} (27 acres) or 5.1% is settled (buildings or roads).

Of the built up area, housing and buildings made up 2.8% and transportation infrastructure made up 2.3%. Out of the forested land, all of the forested land area is covered with heavy forests. Of the agricultural land, 48.4% is used for growing crops and 9.8% is pastures, while 1.4% is used for orchards or vine crops.

On 31 December 2009 Amtsbezirk Burgdorf, the municipality's former district, was dissolved. On the following day, 1 January 2010, it joined the newly created Verwaltungskreis Emmental.

== Coat of arms ==
The blazon of the municipal coat of arms is Gules an Ash Tree or issuant from the Base wavy of the same. The ash tree (German: Esche) makes this an example of canting arms.

== Demographics ==
Oberösch had a population (as of 2014) of 109. As of 2010, 9.0% of the population are resident foreign nationals. Over the last 10 years (2000-2010) the population has changed at a rate of 0%. Migration accounted for 2.7%, while births and deaths accounted for 2.7%.

Most of the population (as of 2000) speaks German (110 or 97.3%) as their first language, Polish is the second most common (2 or 1.8%) and English is the third (1 or 0.9%).

As of 2008, the population was 54.1% male and 45.9% female. The population was made up of 54 Swiss men (48.6% of the population) and 6 (5.4%) non-Swiss men. There were 47 Swiss women (42.3%) and 4 (3.6%) non-Swiss women. Of the population in the municipality, 39 or about 34.5% were born in Oberösch and lived there in 2000. There were 57 or 50.4% who were born in the same canton, while 9 or 8.0% were born somewhere else in Switzerland, and 3 or 2.7% were born outside of Switzerland.

As of 2010, children and teenagers (0–19 years old) make up 21.6% of the population, while adults (20–64 years old) make up 62.2% and seniors (over 64 years old) make up 16.2%.

As of 2000, there were 51 people who were single and never married in the municipality. There were 52 married individuals, 6 widows or widowers and 4 individuals who are divorced.

As of 2000, there were 18 households that consist of only one person and 2 households with five or more people. In 2000, a total of 47 apartments (94.0% of the total) were permanently occupied and 3 apartments (6.0%) were empty.

The historical population is given in the following chart:

== Sights ==
The entire hamlet of Oberösch is designated as part of the Inventory of Swiss Heritage Sites.

== Politics ==
In the 2011 federal election the most popular party was the Federal Democratic Union of Switzerland (EDU) which received 6% of the vote. The next three most popular parties were the Liberal Party of Switzerland (LPS) (0%), the Liberal Party of Switzerland (LPS) (0%) and the Liberal Party of Switzerland (LPS) (0%).

== Economy ==
As of 2011, Oberösch had an unemployment rate of 0%. As of 2008, there were a total of 28 people employed in the municipality. Of these, there were 26 people employed in the primary economic sector and about 8 businesses involved in this sector. 1 person was employed in the secondary sector and 1 person was employed in the tertiary sector, with 1 business in each sector.

In 2008 there were a total of 19 full-time equivalent jobs. The number of jobs in the primary sector was 17, all of which were in agriculture. There was 1 secondary sector job in construction. The number of jobs in the tertiary sector was 1 which was classified as a technical professional or scientist.

In 2000, there were 47 workers who commuted away from the municipality. Of the working population, 10% used public transportation to get to work, and 47.1% used a private car.

== Religion ==
From the 2000 census, 6 or 5.3% were Roman Catholic, while 99 or 87.6% belonged to the Swiss Reformed Church. Of the rest of the population, there were 8 individuals (or about 7.08% of the population) who belonged to another Christian church. 2 (or about 1.77% of the population) belonged to no church, are agnostic or atheist, and 2 individuals (or about 1.77% of the population) did not answer the question.

== Education ==
In Oberösch about 51 or (45.1%) of the population have completed non-mandatory upper secondary education, and 18 or (15.9%) have completed additional higher education (either university or a Fachhochschule). Of the 18 who completed tertiary schooling, 61.1% were Swiss men, 33.3% were Swiss women.

During the 2010-11 school year, there were no students attending school in Oberösch. As of 2000, there were 10 students from Oberösch who attended schools outside the municipality.
