= Kirchberg, Bern =

Kirchberg
- Municipality
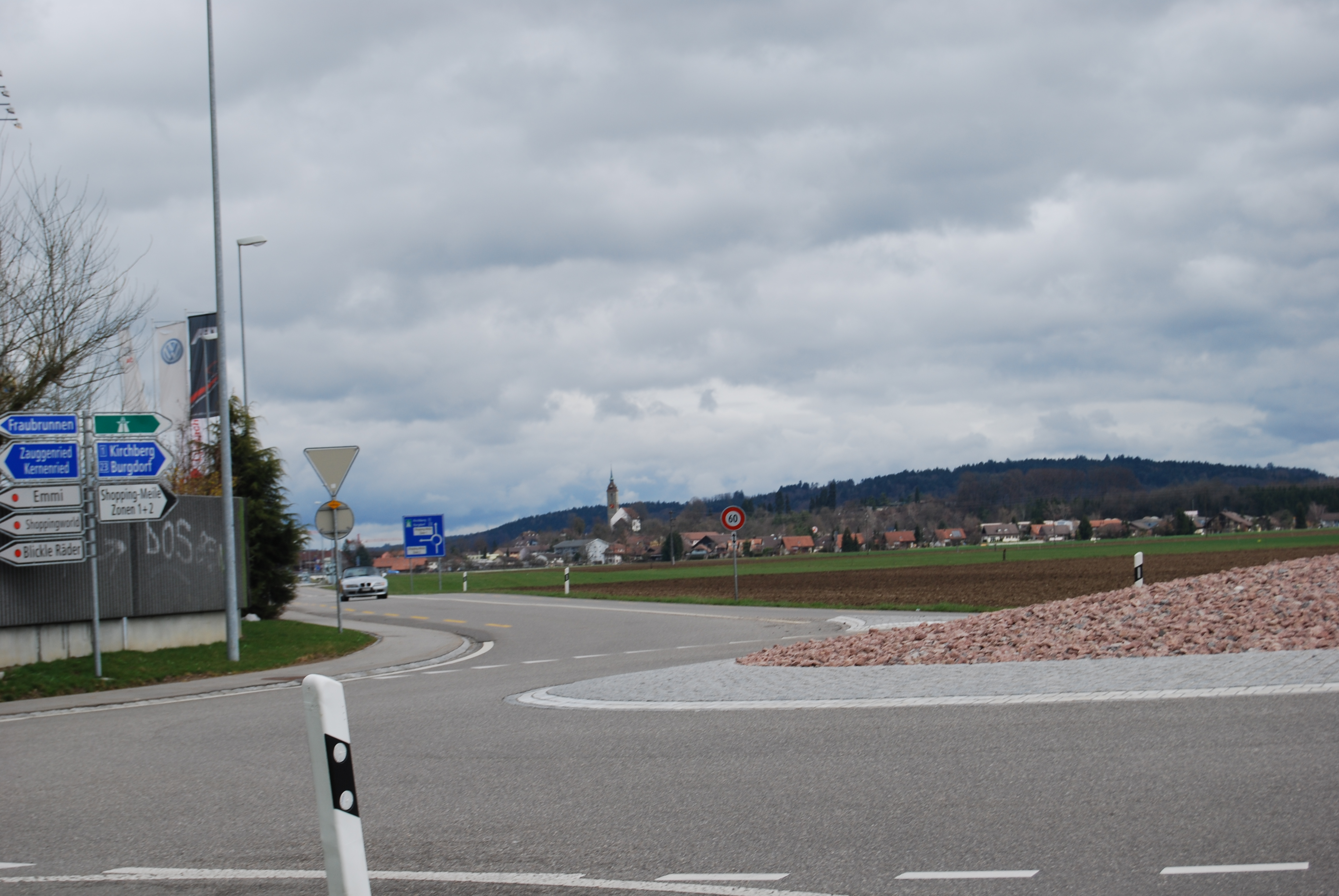
- Kirchberg village from a nearby roundabout

- Flag Coat of arms
- Location of Kirchberg
- Location within Switzerland Location within Canton of Bern
- Coordinates: 47°5′N 7°35′E
- Country: Switzerland
- Canton: Bern
- District: Emmental

Government
  - Executive: Gemeinderat with 7 members
  - Mayor: Gemeindepräsident(in); Andreas Wyss FDP/PLR (as of 2026)

Area
  - Total: 9.0 km^{2} (3.5 sq mi)
- Elevation: 505 m (1,657 ft)

Population (December 2020)
  - Total: 5,919
  - Density: 660/km^{2} (1,700/sq mi)
- Time zone: UTC+01:00 (CET)
  - Summer (DST): UTC+02:00 (CEST)
- Postal code: 3422
- SFOS number: 412
- ISO 3166 code: CH-BE
- Surrounded by: Aefligen, Burgdorf, Ersigen, Lyssach, Rüdtligen-Alchenflüh, Utzenstorf, Wynigen
- Website: www.kirchberg-be.ch

Kirchberg (Swiss Standard German pronunciation: [ˈkɪrçbɛrɡ]) is a municipality in the administrative district of Emmental in the canton of Bern in Switzerland.

== History ==
Aerial view by Walter Mittelholzer (1919)

Kirchberg is first mentioned in 994 and again in 1182 as Chilcberc. In 1704 the village of Guetisberg (now part of Heimiswil) separated from Kirchberg. In 1911 Bickigen separated from Kirchberg and became part of Wynigen. In 1953 Rumendingen separated from Kirchberg.

Traces of prehistoric settlements in the area include Neolithic artifacts at Rüti, Bronze Age items at Emmenbett and La Tene era artifacts in Kirchberg village. No prehistoric villages have been found in the municipality. The village and its church are first mentioned in 994 when they were given to Selz Abbey in Alsace by the noble woman Adelheid, the grandmother of Emperor Otto III. In the 13th century the Barons of Thornberg were the vogts over the bailiwick of Kirchberg. In 1278 Ulrich von Thornberg freed the Abbey's officials in Kirchberg from paying taxes and fortified the growing town. Five years later, in 1283, he got King Rudolph I to grant Kirchberg a town charter based on Bern's charter and to allow the town to hold a weekly market. Ulrich was also able to get complete jurisdiction over the town from the King. However, the new town remained small and never produced the hoped for money.

In 1398, Peter von Thornberg gave the town and surrounding bailiwick to the Carthusian Thorberg Chapterhouse. The Carthusians, in turn, gave the town back to Selz Abbey in 1406. In 1429 the Abbey sold the bailiwick to Bern and in 1481 Bern acquired the rest of Selz Abbey's possessions in the area, including Kirchberg town. In 1471, the town was placed under the authority of the office of the Schultheiss of Burgdorf.

The village church appears to have been part of the gift in 994, but was first mentioned by name in 1208. The church had widespread tithing rights and managed a large parish. The current church building was built in 1506–7.

During the 18th century a number of entrepreneurs were driven out of Burgdorf and established factories in Kirchberg. A bleaching plant opened in 1765, followed by an Indienne textile printing plant in 1784. A wholesale business opened in the town before 1750. In 1765–68, the wealthy industrialist Johann Rudolf Tschiffelis built a manor house in Kirchberg. The house was originally known as Duboisgut, but came to be called the Kleehof and is now a Swiss heritage site of national significance.

Between 1816 and 1843, Burgdorf actively prevented Birchberg from holding markets. The removal of these restrictions together with the creation of a trade association, a bank and the opening of the Kirchberg train station on the Burgdorf-Solothurn railroad in the 1870s created a booming economy. A textile mill opened in 1871, followed by a consumer coop in 1872 and in 1890 an aluminum rolling mill and a weaving factory in Wydenhof. In 1945 a plan to build an airport in the town was finally abandoned. Twenty years later the A1 motorway was built near the town. A connection to the motorway fueled population growth, construction activity and new industries. While Kirchberg has become an industrial and commercial town, the neighboring hamlet of Bütikofen has remained rural and agricultural with extensive forests.

== Geography ==
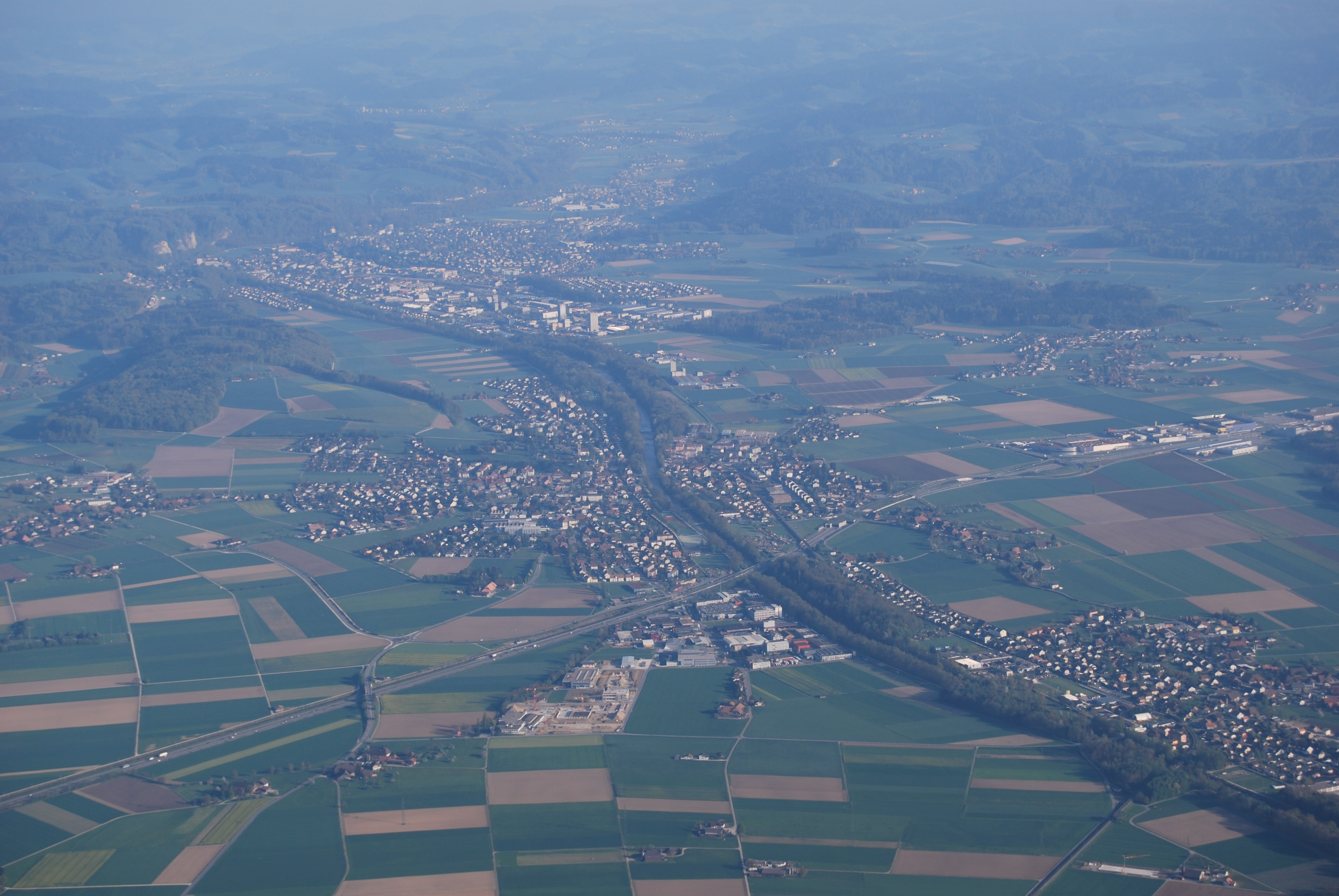
Aerial view of Kirchberg on the left side of the river. Rüdtligen-Alchenflüh is on the right side and Burgdorf is in the background.

Kirchberg has an area of 9.05 km^{2} (3.49 sq mi). Of this area, 4.04 km^{2} (1.56 mi^{2}) or 44.7% is used for agricultural purposes, while 2.94 km^{2} (1.14 mi^{2}) or 32.5% is forested. Of the rest of the land, 1.92 km^{2} (0.74 mi^{2}) or 21.2% is settled (buildings or roads), 0.13 km^{2} (32 acres) or 1.4% is either rivers or lakes and 0.02 km^{2} (4.9 acres) or 0.2% is unproductive land.

Of the built up area, industrial buildings made up 1.9% of the total area while housing and buildings made up 11.2% and transportation infrastructure made up 6.1%. while parks, green belts and sports fields made up 1.4%. Out of the forested land, all of the forested land area is covered with heavy forests. Of the agricultural land, 29.5% is used for growing crops and 13.4% is pastures, while 1.8% is used for orchards or vine crops. All the water in the municipality is flowing water.

The municipality is located on the right bank of the Emme river. It consists of the village of Kirchberg, a bridgehead on the banks of the Emme and the hamlet of Bütikofen.

On 31 December 2009 Amtsbezirk Burgdorf, the municipality's former district, was dissolved. On the following day, 1 January 2010, it joined the newly created Verwaltungskreis Emmental.

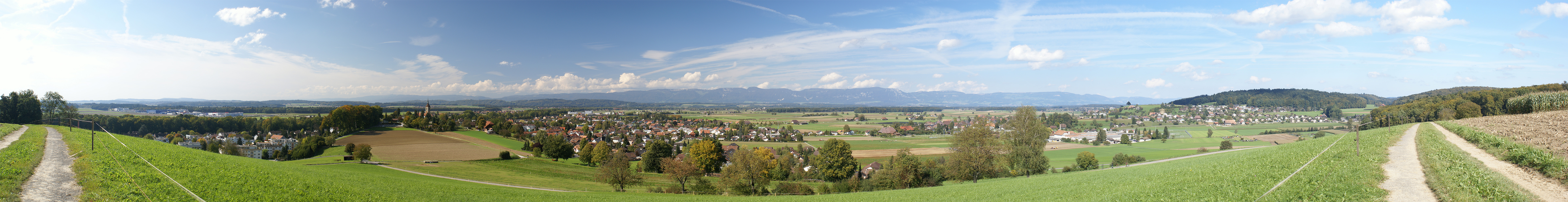
View of Kirchberg looking toward the Canton of Jura. On the left is Kirchberg, on the right is Ersigen

== Coat of arms ==
The blazon of the municipal coat of arms is Azure a Church Argent roofed Gules on a Mount of 3 Coupeaux Vert. The coat of arms is an excellent example of canting arms with a church (German: Kirche) above a mountain (German: Berg).

== Demographics ==
Kirchberg has a population (as of December 2020) of 5,919. As of 2010, 12.7% of the population are resident foreign nationals. Over the last 10 years (2000–2010) the population has changed at a rate of 5.5%. Migration accounted for 4.1%, while births and deaths accounted for 1.8%.

Most of the population (as of 2000) speaks German (4,769 or 90.9%) as their first language, Italian is the second most common (159 or 3.0%) and Albanian is the third (61 or 1.2%). There are 47 people who speak French and 2 people who speak Romansh.

As of 2008, the population was 48.7% male and 51.3% female. The population was made up of 2,347 Swiss men (42.1% of the population) and 368 (6.6%) non-Swiss men. There were 2,523 Swiss women (45.2%) and 341 (6.1%) non-Swiss women. Of the population in the municipality, 1,292 or about 24.6% were born in Kirchberg and lived there in 2000. There were 2,337 or 44.6% who were born in the same canton, while 765 or 14.6% were born somewhere else in Switzerland, and 661 or 12.6% were born outside of Switzerland.

As of 2010, children and teenagers (0–19 years old) make up 20.1% of the population, while adults (20–64 years old) make up 62.9% and seniors (over 64 years old) make up 17%.

As of 2000, there were 2,056 people who were single and never married in the municipality. There were 2,645 married individuals, 283 widows or widowers and 260 individuals who are divorced.

As of 2000, there were 597 households that consist of only one person and 126 households with five or more people. In 2000, a total of 2,113 apartments (92.9% of the total) were permanently occupied, while 109 apartments (4.8%) were seasonally occupied and 53 apartments (2.3%) were empty. As of 2010, the construction rate of new housing units was 4.1 new units per 1000 residents. The vacancy rate for the municipality, in 2011, was 5.22%.

The historical population is given in the following chart:

== Heritage sites of national significance ==
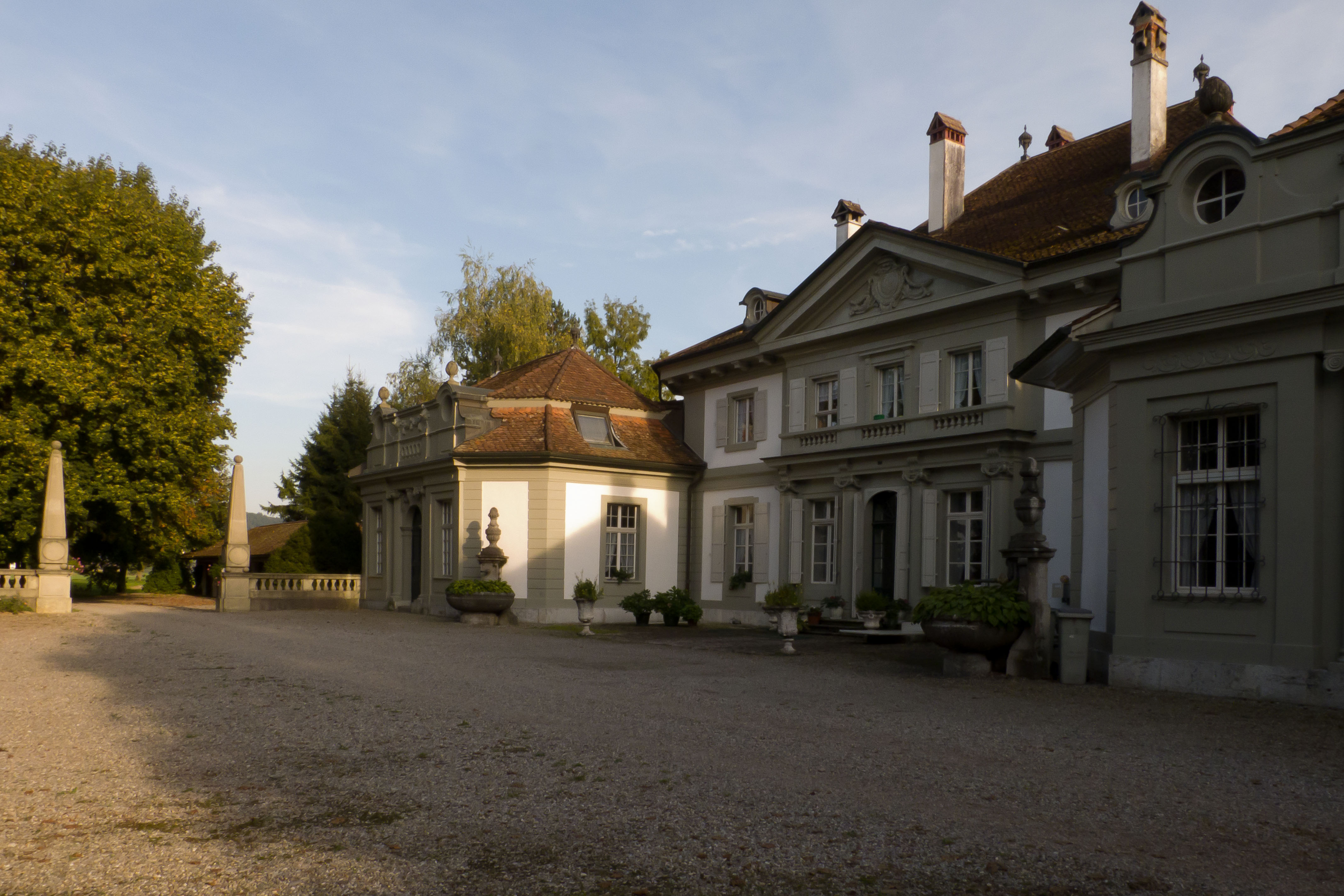
View of the Kleehof from the west

The Kleehof is listed as a Swiss heritage site of national significance. The entire hamlet of Bütikofen is part of the Inventory of Swiss Heritage Sites.

== Politics ==
In the 2011 federal election the most popular party was the Swiss People's Party (SVP) which received 28.4% of the vote. The next three most popular parties were the Conservative Democratic Party (BDP) (22.2%), the Social Democratic Party (SP) (17.6%) and the FDP.The Liberals (10.1%). In the federal election, a total of 2,081 votes were cast, and the voter turnout was 50.9%.

== Economy ==
As of 2011, Kirchberg had an unemployment rate of 2.47%. As of 2008, there were a total of 2,374 people employed in the municipality. Of these, there were 82 people employed in the primary economic sector and about 26 businesses involved in this sector. 1,078 people were employed in the secondary sector and there were 63 businesses in this sector. 1,214 people were employed in the tertiary sector, with 176 businesses in this sector.

In 2008 there were a total of 1,981 full-time equivalent jobs. The number of jobs in the primary sector was 57, all of which were in agriculture. The number of jobs in the secondary sector was 980 of which 754 or (76.9%) were in manufacturing, 1 was in mining and 220 (22.4%) were in construction. The number of jobs in the tertiary sector was 944. In the tertiary sector; 351 or 37.2% were in wholesale or retail sales or the repair of motor vehicles, 69 or 7.3% were in the movement and storage of goods, 34 or 3.6% were in a hotel or restaurant, 70 or 7.4% were in the information industry, 22 or 2.3% were the insurance or financial industry, 119 or 12.6% were technical professionals or scientists, 59 or 6.3% were in education and 85 or 9.0% were in health care.

In 2000, there were 1,609 workers who commuted into the municipality and 1,956 workers who commuted away. The municipality is a net exporter of workers, with about 1.2 workers leaving the municipality for every one entering. Of the working population, 13.3% used public transportation to get to work, and 58.2% used a private car.

== Religion ==
From the 2000 census, 680 or 13.0% were Roman Catholic, while 3,681 or 70.2% belonged to the Swiss Reformed Church. Of the rest of the population, there were 16 members of an Orthodox church (or about 0.31% of the population), there were 7 individuals (or about 0.13% of the population) who belonged to the Christian Catholic Church, and there were 283 individuals (or about 5.40% of the population) who belonged to another Christian church. There were 9 individuals (or about 0.17% of the population) who were Jewish, and 265 (or about 5.05% of the population) who were Islamic. There were 2 individuals who were Buddhist, 16 individuals who were Hindu and 4 individuals who belonged to another church. 276 (or about 5.26% of the population) belonged to no church, are agnostic or atheist, and 143 individuals (or about 2.73% of the population) did not answer the question.

== Education ==
In Kirchberg about 2,155 or (41.1%) of the population have completed non-mandatory upper secondary education, and 667 or (12.7%) have completed additional higher education (either university or a Fachhochschule). Of the 667 who completed tertiary schooling, 75.1% were Swiss men, 19.9% were Swiss women, 3.1% were non-Swiss men and 1.8% were non-Swiss women.

The Canton of Bern school system provides one year of non-obligatory Kindergarten, followed by six years of Primary school. This is followed by three years of obligatory lower Secondary school where the students are separated according to ability and aptitude. Following the lower Secondary students may attend additional schooling or they may enter an apprenticeship.

During the 2010–11 school year, there were a total of 689 students attending classes in Kirchberg. There were 5 kindergarten classes with a total of 93 students in the municipality. Of the kindergarten students, 18.3% were permanent or temporary residents of Switzerland (not citizens) and 23.7% have a different mother language than the classroom language. The municipality had 18 primary classes and 333 students. Of the primary students, 19.8% were permanent or temporary residents of Switzerland (not citizens) and 26.7% have a different mother language than the classroom language. During the same year, there were 14 lower secondary classes with a total of 263 students. There were 12.2% who were permanent or temporary residents of Switzerland (not citizens) and 21.3% have a different mother language than the classroom language.

As of 2000, there were 285 students in Kirchberg who came from another municipality, while 207 residents attended schools outside the municipality.
