= Rudolf Sutermeister =

Swiss Socialist and sociopolitical writer

- Born: 4 May 1802; Wynigen, Switzerland
- Died: 9 May 1868 (aged 66); Zofingen, Switzerland

Philosophical work
- Era: 19th-century philosophy
- Region: Western Philosophy
- School: Utopian socialist
- Main interests: Economics
- Notable ideas: Swiss liberal-communist circle

Rudolf Sutermeister (May 7, 1802 – May 9, 1868) was a Swiss medical doctor for the poor. He was also a businessman, a manufacturer, an early socialist and a socio-political writer. He is considered one of the first native Swiss German socialists, together with Gustav Siegfried, Johann Jakob Treichler, and Karl Bürkli; however, unlike Siegfried, he is also considered a utopian.

== Biography ==
Sutermeister was born in the municipality of Wynigen. He was a minister's son who came from an old family of town councillors in Zofingen, where he was naturalized. He graduated in medicine from the University of Basel and was trained as a doctor in Bern. In 1824, Sutermeister began practicing medicine in Zofingen.

He is often regarded as an economical and spiritual "proletaroid." This is because he lived in financial distress while serving as a medical doctor to the lower class.

In the 1840s, inspired by Charles Fourier and Wilhelm Weitling, Sutermeister believed that the welfare of his country depended on a communist transformation. Three years earlier in 1837, he had appealed to the public for the first time with a social reform manifesto. He devised plans for socialist experiments following the Saint-Simon pattern. Together with August Becker and Johannes Glur, he formed a liberal-communist circle. His last years were filled with litigation and he sank into oblivion. He died in Zofingen, on May 9, 1868.

== Works ==
Sutermeister wrote many works with communist and chiliastic content. These works were disseminated in Switzerland by the Bund der Gerechten (Justice League).

- Tagwache zum Anbruch des Reiches Gottes auf Erden. Oder: Der Armen Erlösung, der Schwachen Heil, der Reichen Glück, der Menschen höchstes Ziel. (Clarion Call for the Advent of the Reign of God on Earth. Or: Rescue for the Poor, Health for the Weak, Happiness for the Rich, the Highest Goal of Men.) Zofingen, 1837.
- Ehrerbietige Vorstellung und Bitte an den tit. Großen und Kleinen Rat des löblichen Kantons Aargau. (Respectful Presentation and Appeal to the Great and Small Council of the Honorable Canton of Aargau.) 13 November 1840.
- Aufruf zur Bildung eines allgemeinen Vereines, zu gegenseitiger, bestmöglicher Erleichterung, Vervollkommnung und Beglückung. (Appeal for the Establishment of a General Union, for the Best Possible Mutual Ease, Improvement, and Happiness.) Langenthal 1843.
- Die Not und Rettung. Ein Wort zur Zeit. Zunächst an das liebe Schweizervolk. (The Need and the Escape from It. A Word for the Times. Chiefly to Our Dear Swiss People.) Langenthal 1845.
- Die schreckliche Vernichtung unseres bestehenden, sogenannten Rechts oder Unrechts durch das wahre Christentum. (The Dreadful Destruction of our Existing So-Called Justice, or Injustice, Through True Christianity.) Zofingen 1846. 20 pp.
- Ernste Bemerkungen, Winke und Warnungen für alle Grütlianer und Eidgenossen insgesammt / Ein freies Wort gesprochen im Grütliverein in Zofingen, den 26. Dezember 1849 von Rud. Sutermeister, Arzt. (Serious Observations, Hints, and Warnings for All Grütlians and the Swiss as a Whole. A Free Word Spoken in the Grütli Union in Zofingen on December 26, 1849, by Rudolf Sutermeister, Physician.)
- Allen Aargauern zu gefälliger Beachtung empfohlen. September 1851. (Commended to the Kind Consideration of All People of Aargau, September 1851.) 11 pp.
- Ehrerbietige Vorstellung und Einladung an meine lieben Mitmenschen. (Honorable Presentation and Invitation to my Dear Fellow Men.) 5 pp.

== Bibliography ==
- Eduard Vischer: Sutermeister, Rudolf. In: Otto Mittler and Georg Boner (ed.) Historische Gesellschaft des Kantons Aargau (publisher): Biographisches Lexikon des Aargaus, 1803–1957. Aarau: Verlag H. R. Sauerländer & Co., 1958. pp. 776–778.
- Author unknown: Rudolf Sutermeister. In: Argovia. Vol. 88. Aarau: Historische Gesellschaft des Kantons Aargau, 1976. p. 341.
- Rudolf Weber: Rudolf Sutermeister und Gustav Siegfried: zwei Zofinger Frühsozialisten. In: Zofinger Neujahrsblatt. Vol. 87, 2002. p. 27–42.
- Entry in: Rudolf Vierhaus (publisher): Deutsche Biographische Enzyklopädie (DBE). 2. überarbeitete und erweiterte Ausgabe. Vol. 9: Schlumberger–Thiersch. Munich: K. G. Saur, 2008.
- Deutsches Biographisches Archiv. Neue Folge bis zur Mitte des 20. Jahrhunderts (DBA II). 1290, 232–240.
- Deutsches Biographisches Archiv 1960–1999 (DBA III). 905, 77.
- Minutes of the Small Council; Acts of the same. Aarau.
- Minutes of the General Council, Acts and Correspondence. Stadtarchiv Zofingen.
- Correspondence of Wilhelm Weitling. Staatsarchiv Zürich.
