= Schwende, Baden-Württemberg =

Coordinates: 47°51′N 9°12′E

Schwende is a village in the district of Sigmaringen in the state of Baden-Württemberg, Germany. Schwende lies on the edge of the Waldhof forest area southeast of the suburb of Herdwangen.

== History ==
The village name, first mentioned as Swendi in 1201, marks the village as a "Schwendbau," or clearing settlement.

Schwende originally belonged to the Lords of Bodman, but was given to Petershausen Abbey in 1253. A manorial Kelhof of the Petershausen monastery is mentioned in 1359. The local court was exercised at this court. During the Peasants' War (1524 - 1525), several inhabitants of the small village were executed for refusing to fight against rebellious peasants and for inciting mutiny. Jacob Forster from Schwende was executed in Sernatingen (today Ludwigshafen) and two other Schwendeners, Jörg Hahn and Hans Kum, were sentenced to torture and death in Überlingen.

Like the rest of the Petershausen Abbey, Schwende came under the control of the Grand Duchy of Baden after German secularization. Within the joint municipality of Herdwangen, Schwende defended itself against the loss of independence until 1924, when the district office decreed the incorporation into Herdwangen.

Along with Herdwangen, the village became a part of the new municipality of Herdwangen-Schönach in the municipal reform of 1974.

== Major sights ==
The Chapel of St. Sebastian from the 18th century is a major sight in the village.
