= Schwend =

Scwhend is a toponymic surname of German origin, a variant of Schwandt, derived from any of the numerous places in Germany named Schwend, Schwendt, Schwende, etc. Notable people with the surname include:

- Friedrich Schwend (1906–1980), German spy
- Louis E. Schwend (1875–1900), American architect

== See also ==
- Gertrud Schwend-Uexküll (1867–1901), Russian-born educator
- Simon Schwendener (1829–1919), Swiss botanist known by the author abbreviation Schwend.
- Schwand (disambiguation)
- Schwende (disambiguation)
