= Schwanden =

Schwanden may refer to places in Switzerland:

- Schwanden bei Brienz, a municipality in the canton of Bern
- Schwanden (Glarus), a village in the canton of Glarus
- Schwanden (Sigriswil), a village in the municipality of Sigriswil in the canton of Bern
- Schwanden, part of the former municipality of Bickigen-Schwanden in the canton of Bern
