= Schwende =

Schwende may refer to:

- Schwende District, Appenzell Innerrhoden, Switzerland
- Schwende, Baden-Württemberg, Germany, a village in Herdwangen-Schönach

== See also ==
- Schwend
- Schwendt
