= Wynigen =

- Municipality
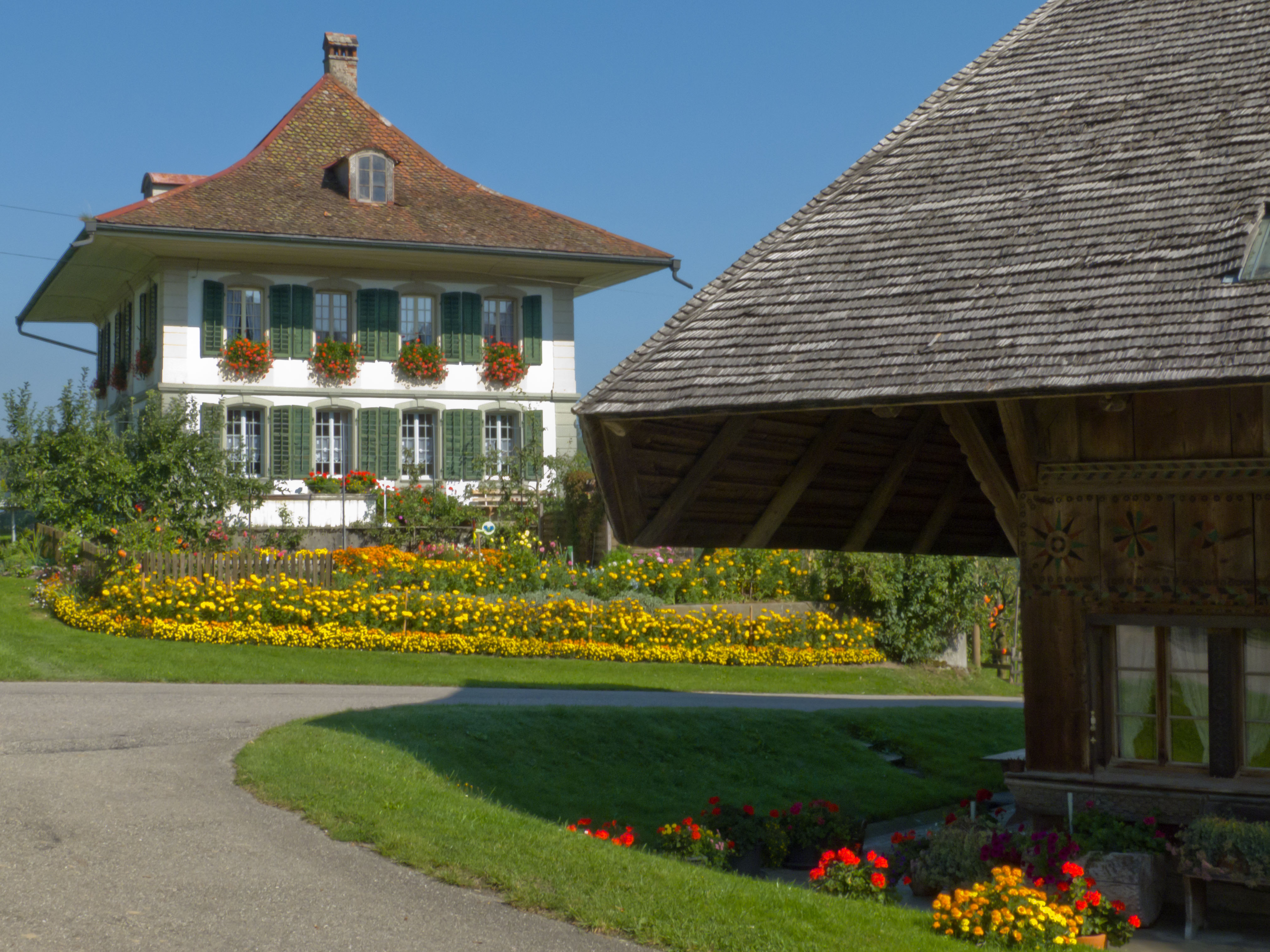
- Farmhouse Glugge and manor house in Wynigen village

- Flag Coat of arms
- Location of Wynigen
- Location within Switzerland Location within Canton of Bern
- Coordinates: 47°6′N 7°40′E
- Country: Switzerland
- Canton: Bern
- District: Emmental

Government
  - Executive: Gemeinderat with 7 members
  - Mayor: Gemeindepräsident(in); Sandra Sommer FDP/PLR (as of 2026)

Area
  - Total: 28 km^{2} (11 sq mi)
- Elevation: 530 m (1,740 ft)
- Highest elevation: 850 m (2,790 ft)
- Lowest elevation: 500 m (1,600 ft)

Population (December 2020)
  - Total: 2,077
  - Density: 74/km^{2} (190/sq mi)
- Time zone: UTC+01:00 (CET)
  - Summer (DST): UTC+02:00 (CEST)
- Postal code: 3472
- SFOS number: 424
- ISO 3166 code: CH-BE
- Surrounded by: Affoltern im Emmental, Alchenstorf, Burgdorf, Ersigen, Heimiswil, Kirchberg, Ochlenberg, Oeschenbach, Rumendingen, Walterswil
- Website: www.wynigen.ch

Wynigen is a municipality in the administrative district of Emmental in the canton of Bern in Switzerland.

== History ==
Aerial view by Walter Mittelholzer (1922)

Wynigen is first mentioned in 1185 as Winingen. Bickigen village was first mentioned in 1261/63 as Bicchingen.

The oldest evidence of humans in the municipal area are some Hallstatt culture grave mounds on the Füstlenberg and some La Tene culture graves in Bickigen. Other traces of prehistoric settlements include the earthen fortifications at Heidenstatt and the fortresses at Grimmenstein, Friesenberg and Schwanden. The first time the village is mentioned it belonged to the Zähringen Dukes. After their line died out in 1218 it was inherited by the Counts of Kyburg. By 1261-63 it was part of the officium Gutisberg. Ministerialis (unfree knights in the service of a feudal overlord) families in Kyburg service built castles in the area and helped guard other Kyburg lands. The Lords of Wynigen, the Fries of Friesenberg and the Lords of Grimmenstein all held Kyburg fiefs in the area. During the 13th century all three families drew closer to Bern and eventually became citizens of Bern or Thun and lost their Kyburg fiefs. In the 14th century, all three of these families died out.

During the Burgdorf war, in 1383-84, between the Counts of Kyburg and the city of Bern, the Counts lost all their land in Wynigen. Bern besieged the castles and destroyed Friesenberg and possibly Schwanden. However, at Grimmenstein Castle, the garrison surrendered and handed the castle over to Bern. In 1402, the Kyburg's were forced to sell the low court at Bickigen-Schwanden to Burgdorf and their fields and forests in Wynigen to Petermann von Rohrmoos who held Grimmenstein for Bern. In 1406, Bern outright annexed the villages and incorporated them into the County of Wangen. In 1431 it was transferred to the Burgdorf District. Then, in 1497, Bern bought the Herrschaft of Wynigen and Grimmenstein Castle. Five years later the villages and castle were given to the Bernese Schultheiss of Burgdorf.

The village church was first mentioned in 1275. The original building was replaced with a new church in the 16th century, which in turn was rebuilt in 1671. The chapel of Friesenberg Castle in Kappelen was the parish church for a parish that was independent of Wynigen's parish. The chapel remained independent until after the Protestant Reformation, after which it apparently was abandoned and fell into ruin.

By the 13th or 14th century there were a number of large farms that raised both grain and livestock around the village. Despite good transportation links on the Burgdorf-Langenthal road and a rail station on the Olten-Bern railway, the village remained largely rural and agricultural. Every factory that opened in the village either moved to a neighboring town or went bankrupt. The only exceptions were dairy factories in Friesenberg, Breitenegg and Wynigen which produced cheese from milk from local livestock.

The Wynigen school district includes Wynigen, home to a secondary school since 1835, Kappelen, Mistelberg and Rüedisbach. However, as a response to falling enrollment, in 2007 only the schools in Wynigen and Kappelen remained open.

In 1550 Bickigen village was only a couple of farm houses, but by 1764 Bickigen and Schwanden had a total of 106 inhabitants. In 1832 the villages of Bickigen and Schwanden became the municipality of Bickigen-Schwanden. However, political independence did not last long and in 1911 its 147 residents became part of the political municipality and parish of Wynigen. In 1928 the power company BKW built an electrical substation at Bickigen which is a hub in the Swiss and European grid.

Historically, Brechershäusern was not part of the Kyburg officium Gutisberg, the resident were citizens of Burgdorf. In 1312, they granted some of the land in the hamlet to Fraubrunnen Abbey. Until 1887, the hamlets of Brechershäusern, Rain, Buchengasse and Heuweg were part of the parish of Koppigen and formed an enclave in Wynigen. The four hamlets formed an independent political municipality with 118 inhabitants in 1880.

== Geography ==
Wynigen has an area of 28.32 km^{2} (10.93 sq mi). Of this area, 16.02 km^{2} (6.19 mi^{2}) or 56.6% is used for agricultural purposes, while 10.57 km^{2} (4.08 mi^{2}) or 37.4% is forested. Of the rest of the land, 1.59 km^{2} (0.61 mi^{2}) or 5.6% is settled (buildings or roads), 0.06 km^{2} (15 acres) or 0.2% is either rivers or lakes.

Of the built up area, housing and buildings made up 2.7% and transportation infrastructure made up 2.4%. Out of the forested land, 35.5% of the total land area is heavily forested and 1.8% is covered with orchards or small clusters of trees. Of the agricultural land, 21.3% is used for growing crops and 33.7% is pastures, while 1.7% is used for orchards or vine crops. All the water in the municipality is flowing water.

The municipality is located in the Emmental hill country at an elevation between 500–849 meters (1,640–2,785 ft). It consists of the villages of Wynigen and Bickigen-Schwanden in the valley and the hamlets of Rüedisbach, Kappelen, Mistelberg, Ferrenberg, Breitenegg and Brechershäusern as well as scattered farm houses.

On 31 December 2009 Amtsbezirk Burgdorf, the municipality's former district, was dissolved. On the following day, 1 January 2010, it joined the newly created Verwaltungskreis Emmental.

== Coat of arms ==
The blazon of the municipal coat of arms is Per bend sinister Argent a Rose Gules barbed and seeded proper and of the second.

== Demographics ==
Wynigen has a population (as of December 2020) of 2,077. As of 2010, 2.3% of the population are resident foreign nationals. Over the last 10 years (2000-2010) the population has changed at a rate of -1.2%. Migration accounted for -1.8%, while births and deaths accounted for 1.2%.

Most of the population (as of 2000) speaks German (1,993 or 97.8%) as their first language, Albanian is the second most common (9 or 0.4%) and French is the third (8 or 0.4%). There are 3 people who speak Italian.

As of 2008, the population was 49.1% male and 50.9% female. The population was made up of 979 Swiss men (48.1% of the population) and 19 (0.9%) non-Swiss men. There were 1,009 Swiss women (49.6%) and 27 (1.3%) non-Swiss women. Of the population in the municipality, 932 or about 45.8% were born in Wynigen and lived there in 2000. There were 766 or 37.6% who were born in the same canton, while 220 or 10.8% were born somewhere else in Switzerland, and 57 or 2.8% were born outside of Switzerland.

As of 2010, children and teenagers (0–19 years old) make up 22.9% of the population, while adults (20–64 years old) make up 59.1% and seniors (over 64 years old) make up 17.9%.

As of 2000, there were 883 people who were single and never married in the municipality. There were 965 married individuals, 140 widows or widowers and 49 individuals who are divorced.

As of 2000, there were 213 households that consist of only one person and 89 households with five or more people. In 2000, a total of 736 apartments (89.3% of the total) were permanently occupied, while 52 apartments (6.3%) were seasonally occupied and 36 apartments (4.4%) were empty. As of 2010, the construction rate of new housing units was 1 new units per 1000 residents. The vacancy rate for the municipality, in 2011, was 0.33%.

The historical population is given in the following chart:

== Heritage sites of national significance ==
The farm house at Oberbühl 239, the farm house Glungge at Brechershäusern 340, the village fountain, the former gasthof Wilder Mann, the village rectory and the granary in Oberbüel are listed as Swiss heritage site of national significance. The entire hamlet of Breitenegg is part of the Inventory of Swiss Heritage Sites.

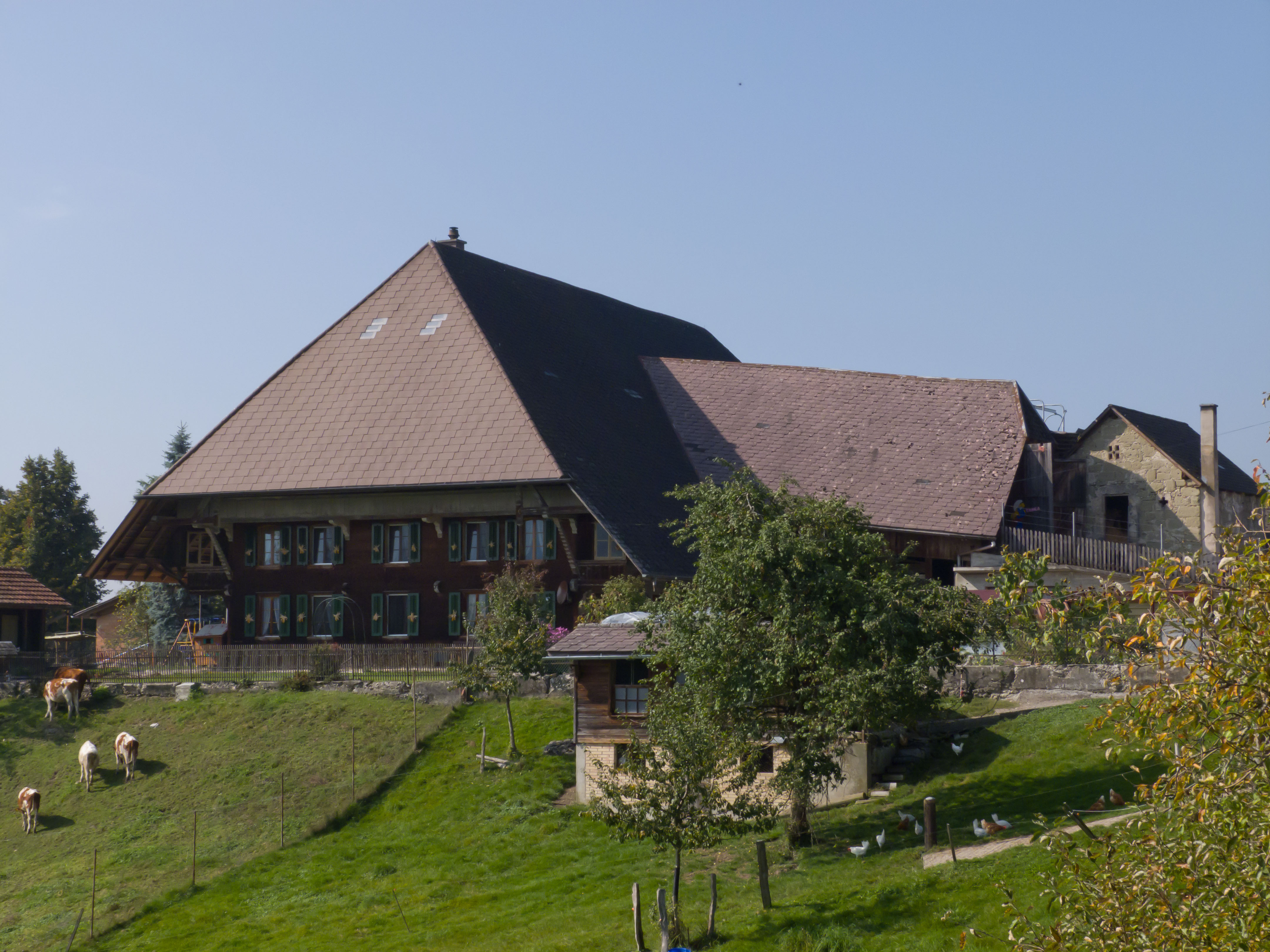
Farm House at Oberbühl 239

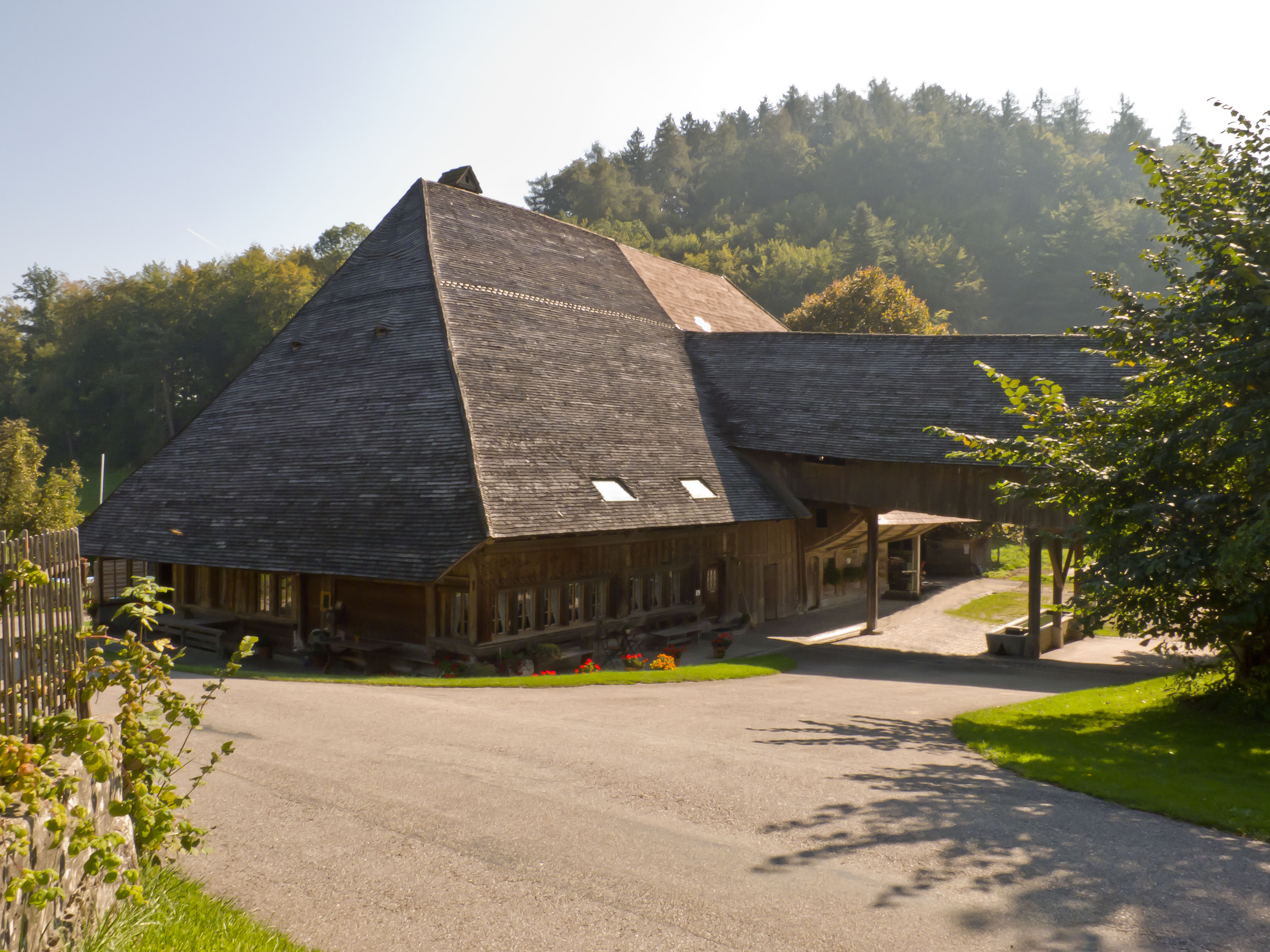
Farm House Glungge at Brechershäusern 340

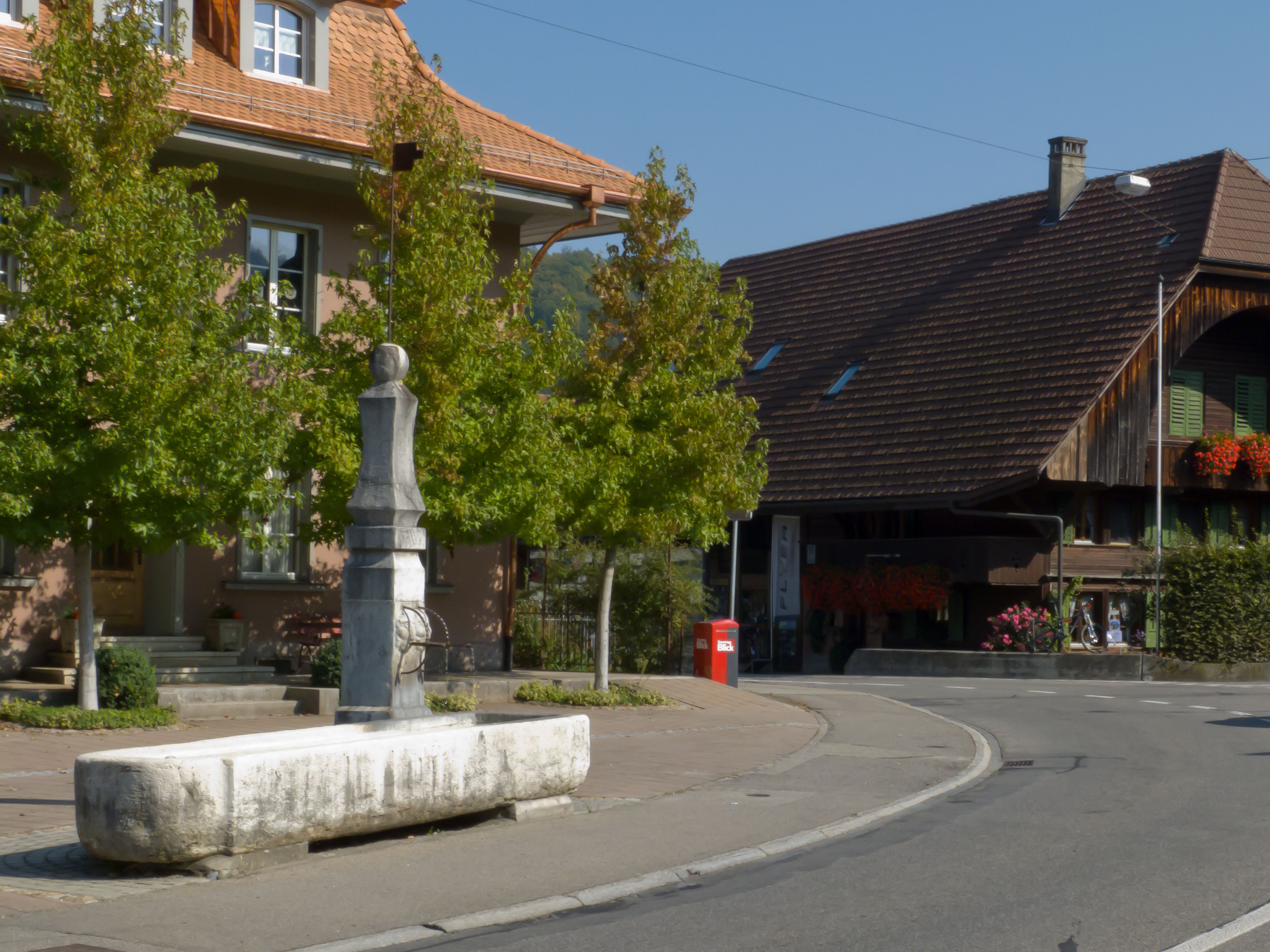
Village fountain

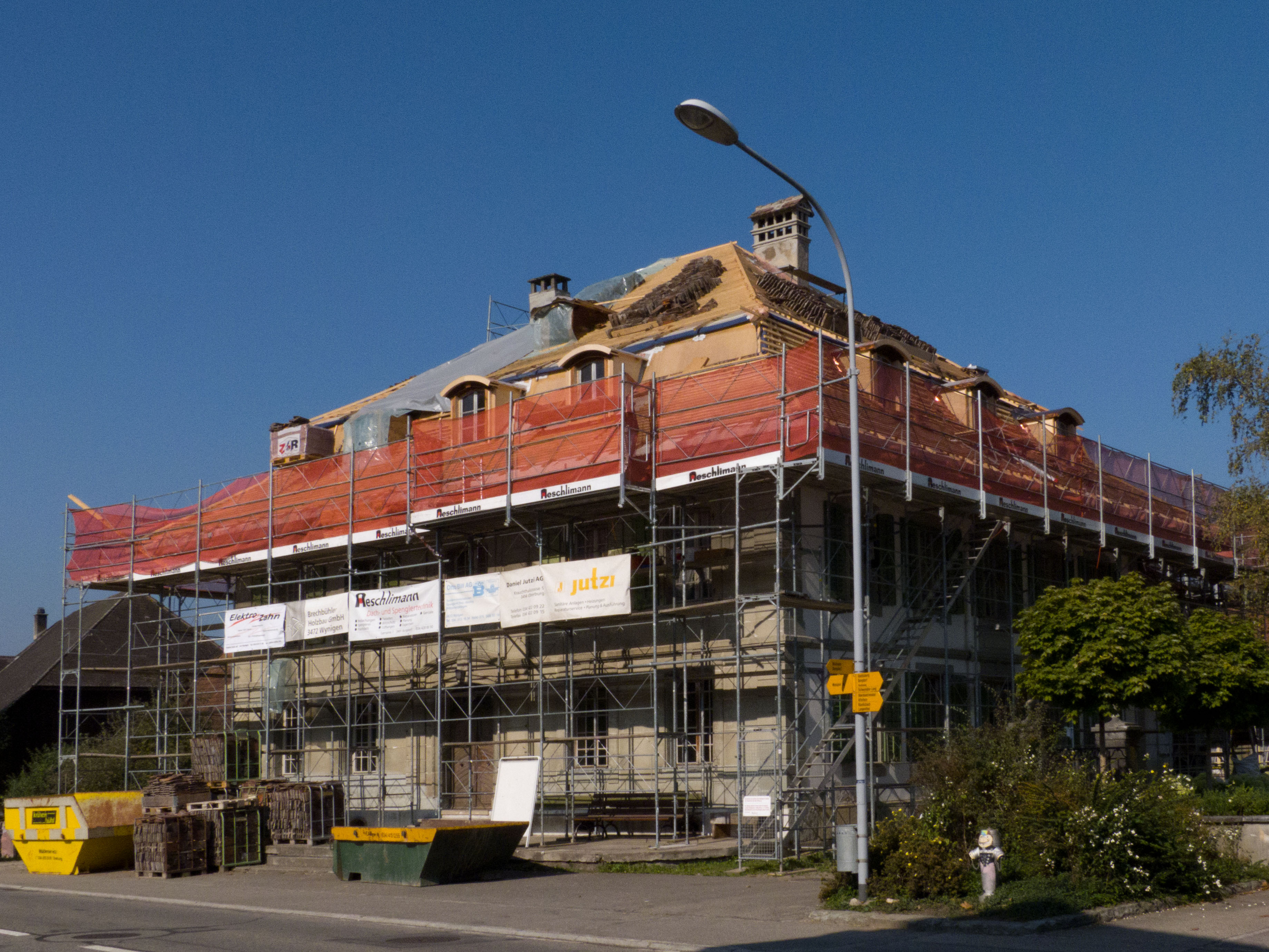
Former Gasthof Wilder Mann

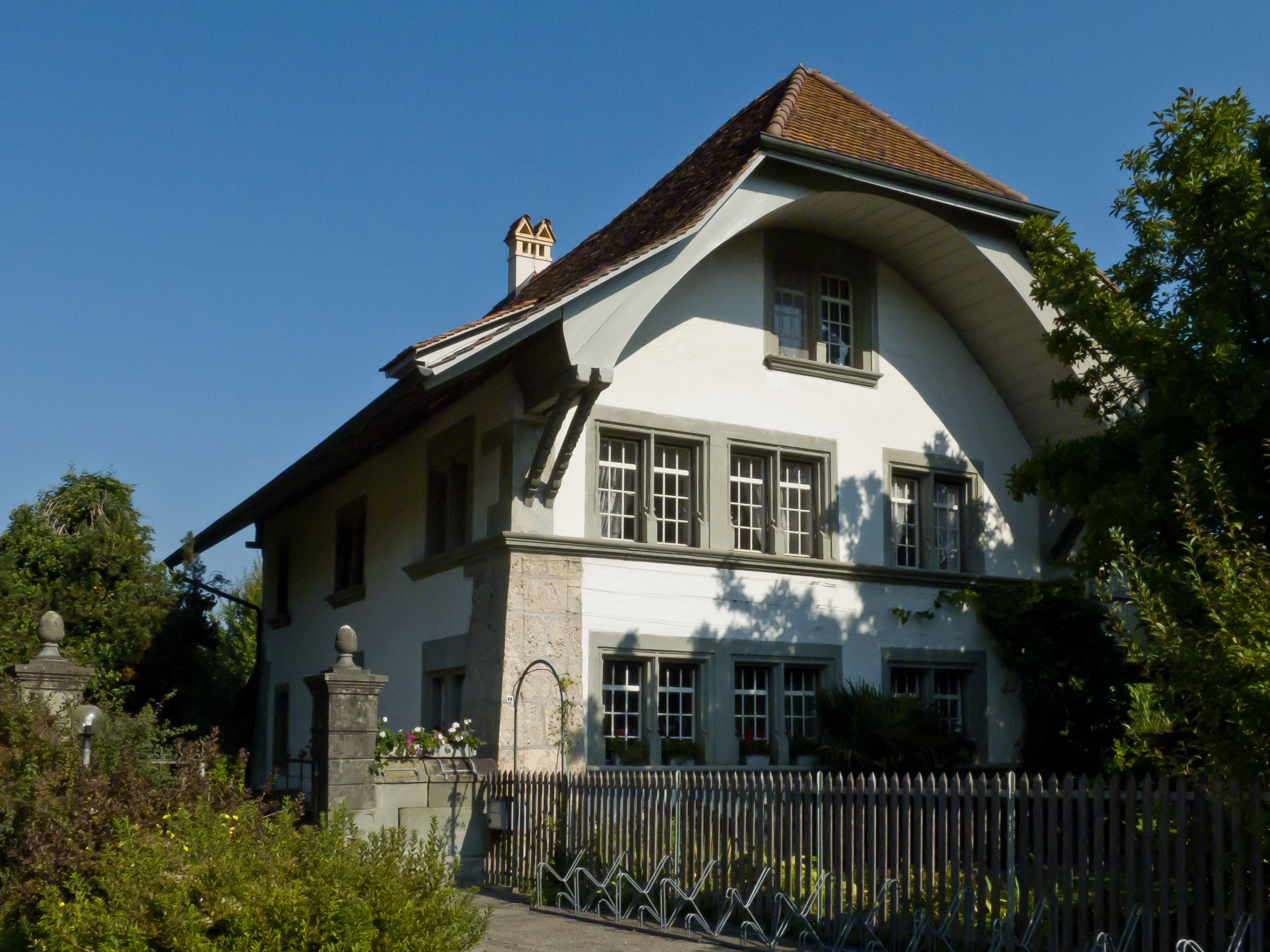
Rectory

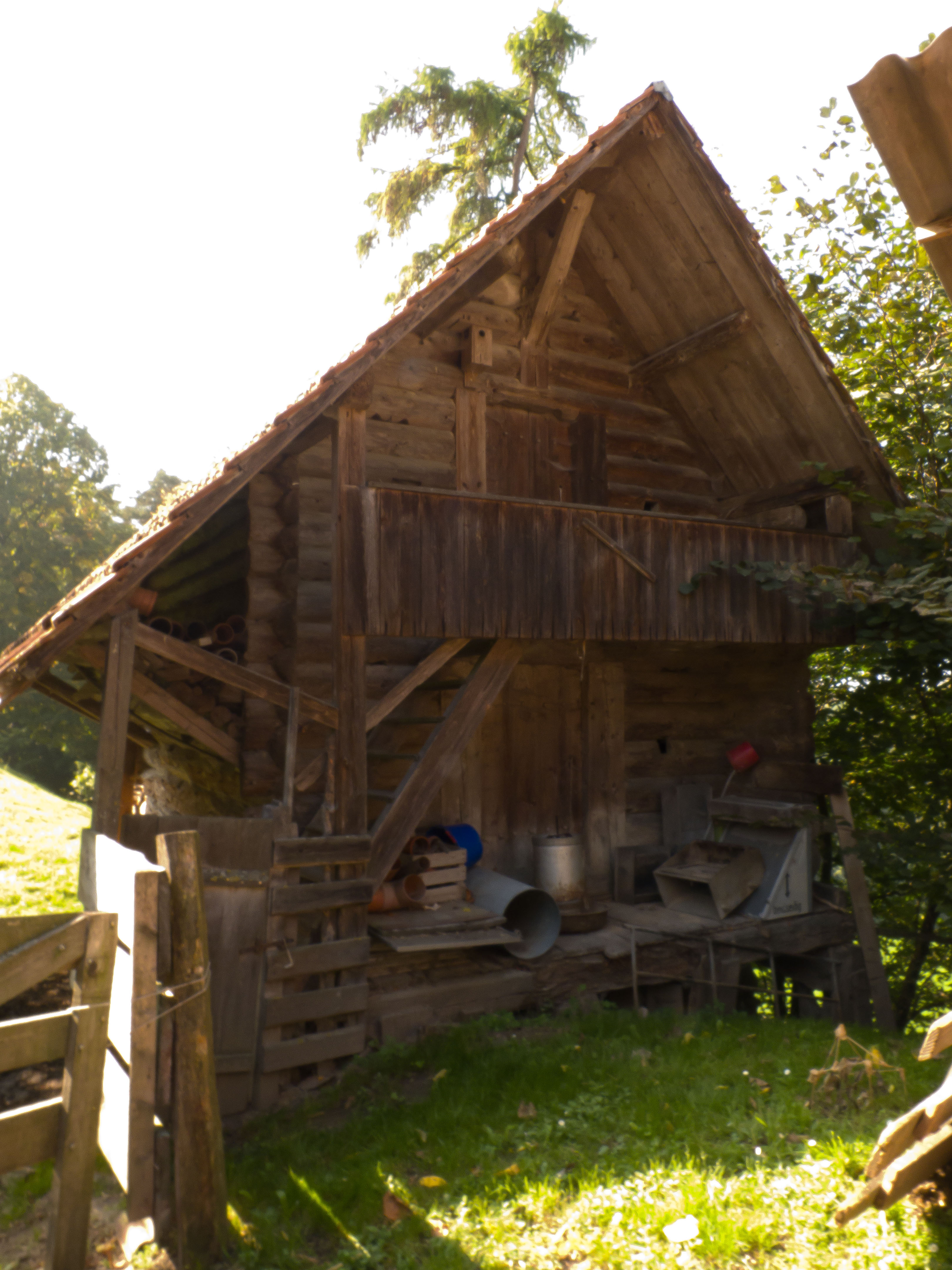
Granary in Oberbüel

== Politics ==
In the 2011 federal election the most popular party was the Swiss People's Party (SVP) which received 45.1% of the vote. The next three most popular parties were the Conservative Democratic Party (BDP) (16.6%), the Social Democratic Party (SP) (10.4%) and the FDP.The Liberals (6.7%). In the federal election, a total of 940 votes were cast, and the voter turnout was 59.8%.

== Economy ==
As of 2011, Wynigen had an unemployment rate of 1.17%. As of 2008, there were a total of 682 people employed in the municipality. Of these, there were 323 people employed in the primary economic sector and about 114 businesses involved in this sector. 123 people were employed in the secondary sector and there were 29 businesses in this sector. 236 people were employed in the tertiary sector, with 41 businesses in this sector.

In 2008 there were a total of 481 full-time equivalent jobs. The number of jobs in the primary sector was 204, of which 202 were in agriculture and 2 were in forestry or lumber production. The number of jobs in the secondary sector was 109 of which 50 or (45.9%) were in manufacturing and 59 (54.1%) were in construction. The number of jobs in the tertiary sector was 168. In the tertiary sector; 53 or 31.5% were in wholesale or retail sales or the repair of motor vehicles, 7 or 4.2% were in the movement and storage of goods, 16 or 9.5% were in a hotel or restaurant, 9 or 5.4% were the insurance or financial industry, 4 or 2.4% were technical professionals or scientists, 26 or 15.5% were in education and 27 or 16.1% were in health care.

In 2000, there were 190 workers who commuted into the municipality and 638 workers who commuted away. The municipality is a net exporter of workers, with about 3.4 workers leaving the municipality for every one entering. Of the working population, 13.1% used public transportation to get to work, and 49.7% used a private car.

== Religion ==
From the 2000 census, 87 or 4.3% were Roman Catholic, while 1,685 or 82.7% belonged to the Swiss Reformed Church. Of the rest of the population, there were 4 members of an Orthodox church (or about 0.20% of the population), there were 2 individuals (or about 0.10% of the population) who belonged to the Christian Catholic Church, and there were 211 individuals (or about 10.36% of the population) who belonged to another Christian church. There were 19 (or about 0.93% of the population) who were Islamic. There was 1 person who was Buddhist, 6 individuals who were Hindu and 2 individuals who belonged to another church. 75 (or about 3.68% of the population) belonged to no church, are agnostic or atheist, and 50 individuals (or about 2.45% of the population) did not answer the question.

== Education ==
In Wynigen about 820 or (40.3%) of the population have completed non-mandatory upper secondary education, and 168 or (8.2%) have completed additional higher education (either university or a Fachhochschule). Of the 168 who completed tertiary schooling, 72.6% were Swiss men, 26.2% were Swiss women.

The Canton of Bern school system provides one year of non-obligatory Kindergarten, followed by six years of Primary school. This is followed by three years of obligatory lower Secondary school where the students are separated according to ability and aptitude. Following the lower Secondary students may attend additional schooling or they may enter an apprenticeship.

During the 2010-11 school year, there were a total of 288 students attending classes in Wynigen. There were 2 kindergarten classes with a total of 46 students in the municipality. Of the kindergarten students, 2.2% were permanent or temporary residents of Switzerland (not citizens). The municipality had 7 primary classes and 121 students. Of the primary students, 2.5% were permanent or temporary residents of Switzerland (not citizens) and 2.5% have a different mother language than the classroom language. During the same year, there were 6 lower secondary classes with a total of 121 students. There were 2.5% who were permanent or temporary residents of Switzerland (not citizens) and 3.3% have a different mother language than the classroom language.

As of 2000, there were 110 students in Wynigen who came from another municipality, while 71 residents attended schools outside the municipality.

Wynigen is home to the Schul- und Gemeindebibliothek Wynigen (municipal library of Wynigen). As of 2008 it was open a total of 256 days with average of 5.5 hours per week during that year.

== Transportation ==
The municipality has a railway station, Wynigen, on the Olten–Bern line. It has regular service to Bern and Olten.

== Famous Natives ==
- Rudolf Sutermeister (born May 7, 1802), socialist, writer, doctor, businessman
