= Rumendingen =

- Municipality
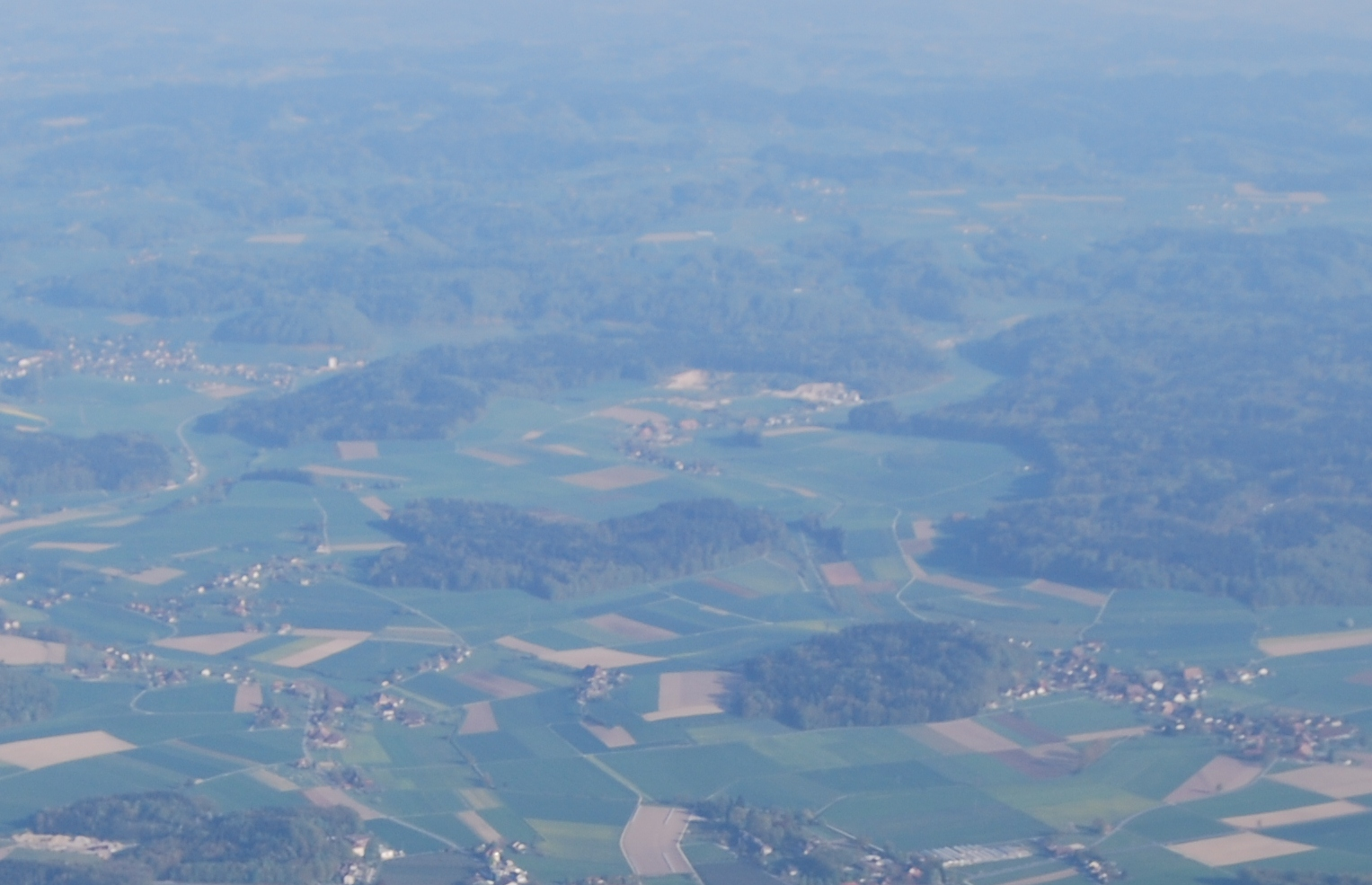
- Aerial view of Rumendingen village and surroundings

- Flag Coat of arms
- Location of Rumendingen
- Location within Switzerland Location within Canton of Bern
- Coordinates: 47°6′N 7°39′E
- Country: Switzerland
- Canton: Bern
- District: Emmental

Government
  - Executive: Gemeinderat with 5 members
  - Mayor: Gemeindepräsident(in); Beatrice Rickli (as of 2026)

Area
  - Total: 2.5 km^{2} (0.97 sq mi)
- Elevation: 526 m (1,726 ft)

Population (December 2020)
  - Total: 81
  - Density: 32/km^{2} (84/sq mi)
- Time zone: UTC+01:00 (CET)
  - Summer (DST): UTC+02:00 (CEST)
- Postal code: 3472
- SFOS number: 421
- ISO 3166 code: CH-BE
- Surrounded by: Alchenstorf, Ersigen, Niederösch, Oberösch, Wynigen
- Website: https://www.rumendingen.ch/

Rumendingen is a municipality in the administrative district of Emmental in the canton of Bern in Switzerland.

== History ==
Rumendingen is first mentioned in 886 as Rumaningun.

For much of its history Rumendingen was part of the jurisdiction and municipality of Niederösch. It shared fields with Wynigen on the border between the two villages. In 1660, the shared land became a source of conflict between them. Over a century later, in 1777, the fields were finally divided between the communities. Until 1953 the residents of the village were part of the parish of Kirchberg, when they joined the Wynigen parish. Beginning in the 19th century, Rumendingen was part of the Wynigen school district.

During the early 20th century, the local economy remained dominated by agriculture. From 1941 until 1965 it was home to a freight warehousing business. A small gravel mine opened in 1963 and provided some jobs for the residents. The Karolinenheim was donated to the community in 1914 and is now a home and workshop for mentally handicapped youth.

== Geography ==
Rumendingen has an area of 2.44 km^{2} (0.94 sq mi). Of this area, 1.46 km^{2} (0.56 mi^{2}) or 60.1% is used for agricultural purposes, while 0.77 km^{2} (0.30 mi^{2}) or 31.7% is forested. Of the rest of the land, 0.21 km^{2} (0.081 mi^{2}) or 8.6% is settled (buildings or roads), 0.04 km^{2} (9.9 acres) or 1.6% is either rivers or lakes.

Of the built up area, housing and buildings made up 1.2% and transportation infrastructure made up 2.5%. Power and water infrastructure as well as other special developed areas made up 4.1% of the area Out of the forested land, all of the forested land area is covered with heavy forests. Of the agricultural land, 44.0% is used for growing crops and 15.6% is pastures. All the water in the municipality is flowing water.

The municipality is located in the Känerich valley.

On 31 December 2009 Amtsbezirk Burgdorf, the municipality's former district, was dissolved. On the following day, 1 January 2010, it joined the newly created Verwaltungskreis Emmental.

== Coat of arms ==
The blazon of the municipal coat of arms is Per bend Gules and Argent two Trefoils counterchanged.

== Demographics ==
Rumendingen has a population (as of December 2020) of 81. As of 2010, 1.3% of the population are resident foreign nationals. Over the last 10 years (2000-2010) the population has changed at a rate of -17.7%. Migration accounted for -16.7%, while births and deaths accounted for 2.1%.

Most of the population (as of 2000) speaks German (134 or 98.5%) as their first language. French and Spanish both have one native speaker.

As of 2008, the population was 51.9% male and 48.1% female. The population was made up of 40 Swiss men (50.6% of the population) and 1 (1.3%) non-Swiss men. There were 38 Swiss women (48.1%) and (0.0%) non-Swiss women. Of the population in the municipality, 34 or about 25.0% were born in Rumendingen and lived there in 2000. There were 74 or 54.4% who were born in the same canton, while 15 or 11.0% were born somewhere else in Switzerland, and 1 or 0.7% were born outside of Switzerland.

As of 2010, children and teenagers (0–19 years old) make up 16.5% of the population, while adults (20–64 years old) make up 59.5% and seniors (over 64 years old) make up 24.1%.

As of 2000, there were 78 people who were single and never married in the municipality. There were 48 married individuals, 5 widows or widowers and 5 individuals who are divorced.

As of 2000, there were 8 households that consist of only one person and 4 households with five or more people. In 2000, a total of 35 apartments (94.6% of the total) were permanently occupied, while 2 apartments (5.4%) were seasonally occupied. The vacancy rate for the municipality, in 2011, was 4.88%.

The historical population is given in the following chart:

== Sights ==
The entire village of Rumendingen is designated as part of the Inventory of Swiss Heritage Sites.

== Politics ==
In the 2011 federal election the most popular party was the Swiss People's Party (SVP) which received 66% of the vote. The next two most popular parties were the Conservative Democratic Party (BDP) (16.9%), and the Green Liberal Party (GLP) (6%). In the federal election, a total of 44 votes were cast, and the voter turnout was 68.8%.

== Economy ==
As of 2011, Rumendingen had an unemployment rate of 0%. As of 2008, there were a total of 96 people employed in the municipality. Of these, there were 28 people employed in the primary economic sector and about 10 businesses involved in this sector. 21 people were employed in the secondary sector and there was 1 business in this sector. 47 people were employed in the tertiary sector, with 1 business in this sector.

In 2008 there were a total of 71 full-time equivalent jobs. The number of jobs in the primary sector was 19, all in agriculture. The number of jobs in the secondary sector was 19, all in manufacturing. The number of jobs in the tertiary sector was 33 all of which were in health care.

In 2000, there were 48 workers who commuted into the municipality and 24 workers who commuted away. The municipality is a net importer of workers, with about 2.0 workers entering the municipality for every one leaving. Of the working population, 6.3% used public transportation to get to work, and 18.9% used a private car.

== Religion ==
From the 2000 census, 8 or 5.9% were Roman Catholic, while 124 or 91.2% belonged to the Swiss Reformed Church. There was 1 individual who was Jewish, and 3 (or about 2.21% of the population) belonged to no church, are agnostic or atheist.

== Education ==
In Rumendingen about 42 or (30.9%) of the population have completed non-mandatory upper secondary education, and 18 or (13.2%) have completed additional higher education (either university or a Fachhochschule). Of the 18 who completed tertiary schooling, 72.2% were Swiss men, 27.8% were Swiss women.

During the 2010-11 school year, there were no students attending school in Rumendingen.

As of 2000, there were 2 students in Rumendingen who came from another municipality, while 12 residents attended schools outside the municipality.
