= Schwandt =

Schwandt is a surname. Notable people with the surname include:

- Erich Schwandt (1935–2017), Canadian musician
- Rhonda Schwandt, American gymnast
- Wilbur Schwandt (1904–1988), American musician

== See also ==
- Schwand (disambiguation)
- Schwend, a variant
