= Schwand =

Schwand may refer to:

- Schwand (Engelberg), a settlement in the municipality of Engelberg in the Swiss canton of Obwalden
- Schwand, a district in the municipality of Schwanstetten, Germany
- Schwand im Innkreis, a municipality in the district Braunau am Inn in Upper Austria, Austria

== See also ==
- Schwandt
- Schwend
