= Bickigen-Schwanden =

Former municipality in Bern, Switzerland

- Former municipality
- Location of Bickigen-Schwanden
- Location within Switzerland Location within Canton of Bern
- Coordinates: 47.092°N 7.6486°E
- Country: Switzerland
- Canton: Bern
- Municipality: Wynigen

Population (1911)
  - Total: 147
- Time zone: UTC+01:00 (CET)
  - Summer (DST): UTC+02:00 (CEST)
- ISO 3166 code: CH-BE
- Website

Bickigen-Schwanden is a former municipality in the canton of Bern, Switzerland. Its area, Bickigen with Schwanden, lies in the municipality of Wynigen, with which it was united in 1911.

== History ==
Bickigen is first mentioned in 1261/1263 as Bicchingen. The area of Bickigen in the dry valley of Wynigen (Wyniger Trockental), with Schwanden on higher hill ground, belonged to the Burgundian royal estate (Königshof) and parish of Kirchberg, which passed to Selz Abbey in Alsace in 994. In the 13th and 14th centuries Bickigen-Schwanden was part of the Kyburg office (Amt) of Gutisberg.

In 1402 the town of Burgdorf acquired from the Kyburgs the low court and property in Bickigen as well as the Bickigenmoos (Bickigen marsh). It later placed Bickigen, as part of the court of Heimiswil, under its bailiwick (Vogtei) of Grasswil, which for high justice belonged to the Bernese bailiwick of the Schultheissenamt of Burgdorf. The manor farm (Meierhof) of Bickigen, after 1555 a fief of the town, received rights of pasture and wood-cutting in the neighboring forests of Burgdorf in 1482, but had to tolerate Burgdorf's cattle on the Bickigen pasture.

In 1550 Bickigen was "nit mer dann ein hoff" (no more than a farm), but by 1764, together with Schwanden, it had grown to 106 inhabitants. In 1688 Bickigen-Schwanden and Hofholz, together with Gutisberg until 1704, formed a community for poor relief (Armensteuergemeinde), and from 1832 to 1910 they formed the political municipality of Bickigen-Schwanden. In 1911 the municipality, with 147 inhabitants, was united with Wynigen both ecclesiastically and politically. Since 1928 the Bickigen substation of BKW has been a node in the Swiss and European interconnected grid.

== Bibliography ==
- Heimatbuch des Amtes Burgdorf und der Kirchgemeinden Utzenstorf und Bätterkinden, 2 vols., 1930–1938
- F. Häusler, Das Emmental im Staate Bern bis 1798, 2 vols., 1958–1968
- H. Schneider et al., Wynigen, 1985

=== Sources ===
- Collection of Swiss Law Sources (SSRQ), BE II/9
