= Herdwangen-Schönach =

- Municipality
- Coat of arms

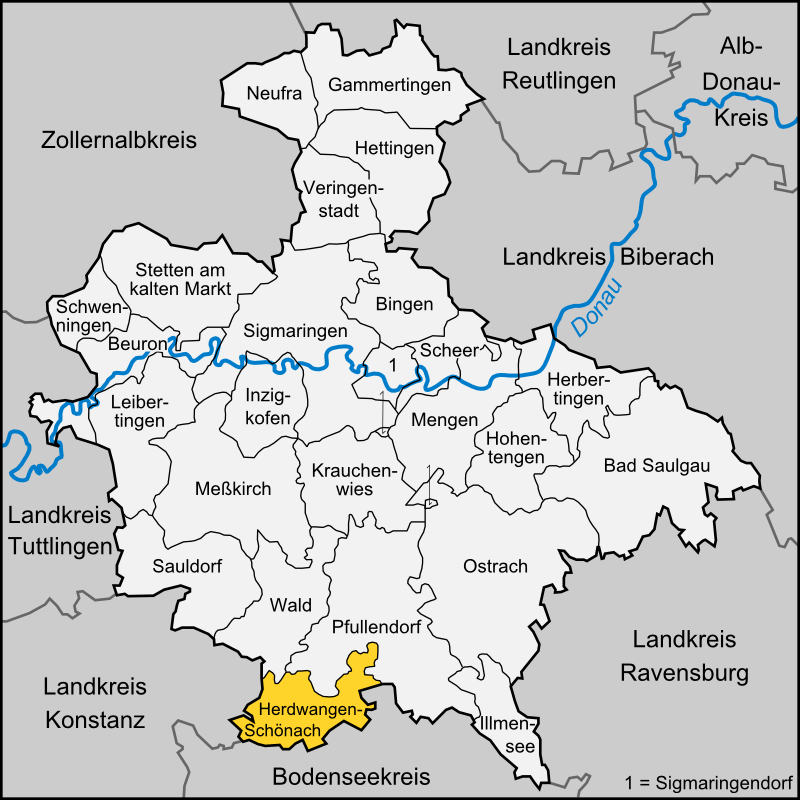
- Location of Herdwangen-Schönach within Sigmaringen district
- Interactive map of Herdwangen-Schönach
- Location within Germany Location within Baden-Württemberg
- Coordinates: 47°51′50.7″N 9°10′26.2″E
- Country: Germany
- State: Baden-Württemberg
- Admin. region: Tübingen
- District: Sigmaringen
- Subdivisions: 3

Government
  - Mayor (2023–31): Alexandra Kipp

Area
  - Total: 36.52 km^{2} (14.10 sq mi)
- Elevation: 605 m (1,985 ft)

Population (2025-12-31)
  - Total: 3,381
  - Density: 92.58/km^{2} (239.8/sq mi)
- Time zone: UTC+01:00 (CET)
  - Summer (DST): UTC+02:00 (CEST)
- Postal codes: 88634
- Dialling codes: 07557, 07552
- Vehicle registration: SIG
- Website: www.herdwangen-schoenach.de

Herdwangen-Schönach is a municipality in the district of Sigmaringen in Baden-Württemberg in Germany.

The municipality lies 15 kilometers north of the Bodensee, in the upper Linzgau, between the cities Pfullendorf in the north and Überlingen in the south. With the municipality reform of 1974 the three municipalities Herdwangen, Großschönach and Oberndorf were merged into one. The coat of arms was derived from the coats of arms of the three predecessor municipalities.
