= Thorberg Castle =

Carthusian monastery in Krauchthal, Bern, Switzerland

Coordinates: 47°00′09″N 7°33′51″E

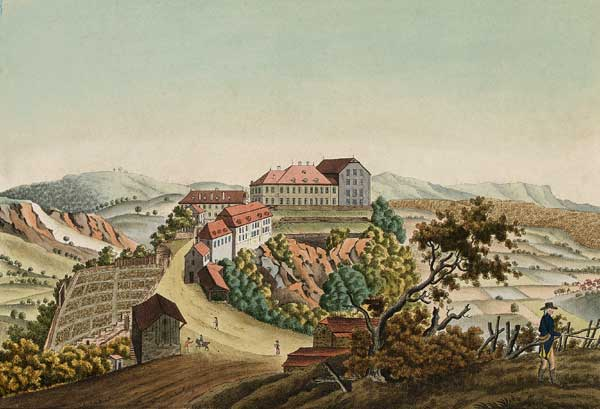
Coloured engraving of Thorberg Castle

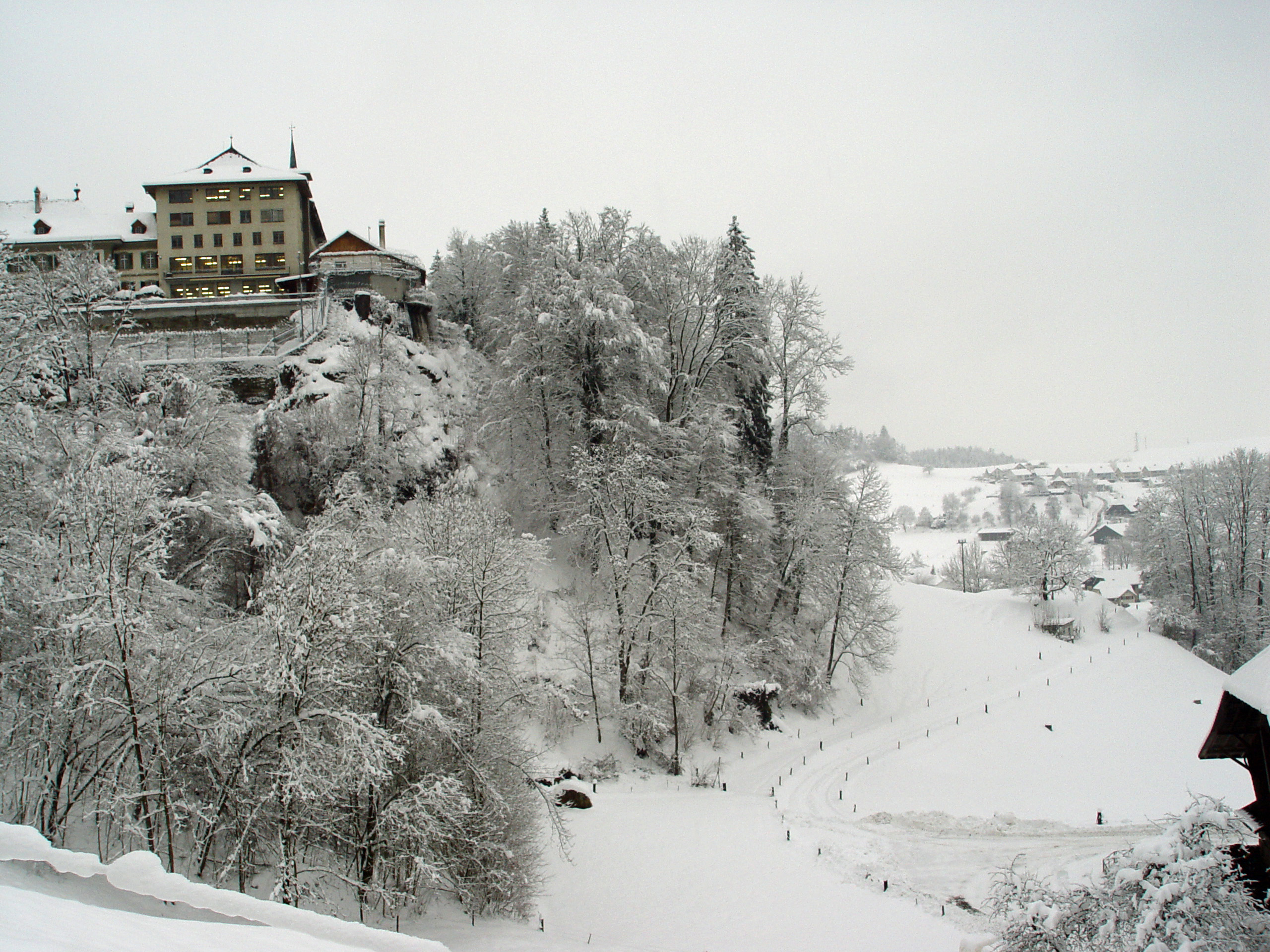
Thorberg Prison today

Thorberg Castle (German: Schloss Thorberg) is a former Carthusian monastery, or charterhouse, now a prison, located in Krauchthal in the Canton of Bern, Switzerland.

== History ==
Of the castle of the von Thorberg family, first documented in 1175, there remain only fragments of the foundations of the tower. The family died out in 1397 with Peter von Thorberg, the last knight: he bequeathed his many estates to the Carthusians, who converted the castle into a Carthusian monastery (or charterhouse).

At the Reformation in 1528 all the assets and property of the monastery passed to the state of Bern. The income from the Vogtei Thorberg was administered by a Vogt from the Bern patriciate. Until 1798 various care organisations, a prison and a hospital were accommodated in the monastery buildings.

In 1805 the former almshouse, which had provided shelter for the aged poor, was put to use as a reformatory, model school and ancillary (or overflow) lunatic asylum. To these were added in 1807 a further institution for the accommodation of those who "had not really merited imprisonment". The care organisations were replaced on 1 November 1849 by a workhouse or forced labour unit. The opening of the psychiatric clinic at Waldau near Bern made it possible to close the ancillary asylum in 1855. In 1893 a newly built cell block was opened as a prison; various other extensions were added during the 20th century, most recently in 1998.

== Remains of the monastery buildings ==
From the Carthusian monastery there remain the women's guesthouse and the chapel, dating from 1510 to 1515, the frescoes of which show the Adoration of the Magi and the Adoration of the Shepherds. A figure of the "Man of Sorrows" by the sculptor Erhart Küng, master of works at the Berner Münster, formerly belonging to the charterhouse, is today kept in the Historisches Museum Bern.

== Other ==
The construction of the Baroque castle is from the time of the Landvogt.

The old sandstone quarry nearby can still be seen, particularly the traces of hand-working and handtools.

== Sources and external links ==
- swisscastles.ch: Schloss Thorberg (in German)
- Website of Canton Bern: Institutions at Thorberg (in German)
