= Selz Abbey =

Monastery in Selz, France

Coordinates: 48°53′42″N 8°6′28″E

Imperial Abbey of Selz Reichskloster Selz (de) Abbaye impériale de Seltz (fr)
- 992–1481
- Status: Imperial Abbey of the Holy Roman Empire
- Capital: Selz Abbey
- Government: Principality
- Historical era: Middle Ages
  - Founded by Adelheid: 991
  - Granted immunity by Otto III: 992
  - Mediatised to Electorate of the Palatinate: 1481
  - Abbey secularised: 1803
Preceded by	Succeeded by
Duchy of Swabia	Electorate of the Palatinate

Selz Abbey or Seltz Abbey (German: Kloster Selz; French: Abbaye de Seltz) is a former monastery and Imperial abbey in Seltz, formerly Selz, in Alsace, France.

== History ==
The Benedictine monastery, dedicated to Saints Peter and Paul, was founded in about 991 by Adelheid, the second wife of Otto I and dowager empress, later Saint Adelheid, who was buried there on 16 December 999. In January 992 it was granted royal tuitio and immunity (roughly the equivalent of the later Imperial immediacy) by Otto III.

The abbey suffered from severe floods in 1307, and was rebuilt between 1307 and 1315. The relics of Saint Adelheid, which apparently survived the floods, were moved to the church of Saint Stephen in Seltz. A daughter house of the abbey, founded at Mirmelberg in 1197, was washed away by floods in 1469.

The abbey was eventually secularized in 1481 and the monks formed a college of canons operating as the chapter of the nearby St. Stephen's church (a mile away from the abbey), retaining some of the privileges of the former foundation, although not all the possessions.

The chapter became Protestant in 1575 and was mediatised by the Electorate of the Palatinate. Most of the monastic buildings were quarried from the beginning of the 17th century, except for one which had been used as a reformed academy for young nobles in 1575 but was closed in 1577 because the new Elector was Lutheran.

The Protestant chapter reverted to a canonry in 1684 after Seltz was annexed by France (in 1680) and the local population re-converted to Roman Catholicism. It was dissolved by the bishop of Strasbourg (with the approval of the king of France) in 1692.

The parish of Seltz was dissolved during the rule of the National Convention (1792–95) and the church of St. Stephen was set on fire by Austrian troops after the Battle of Seltz on 23 October 1793. The church survived however and the parish was re-created in 1801 in the time of the French Consulate. The church was extensively rebuilt under the rule of the German Empire (which had annexed Alsace in 1870) for the occasion of the anniversary of the death of the Empress Adelaide in 1899.

The church was almost destroyed during World War II. Restoration was completed in 1958.

== Sources ==
- Seltz Parish website (in French)
