= Burgdorf District =

Burgdorf District Amtsbezirk Burgdorf
- District
- Flag Coat of arms

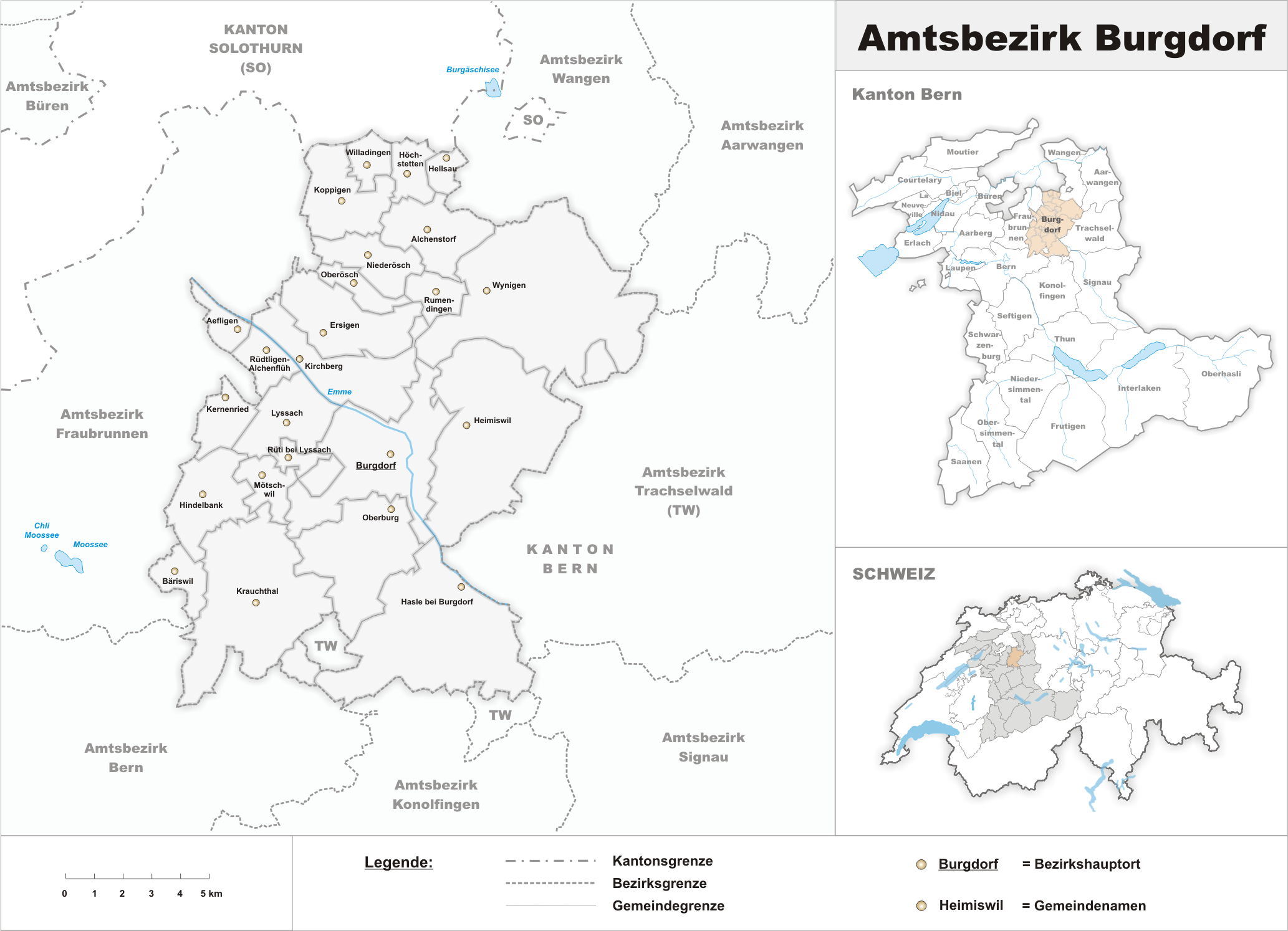
- Coordinates: 47.05°N 7.61667°E
- Country: Switzerland
- Canton: Bern
- Capital: Burgdorf

Area
  - Total: 205 km^{2} (79 sq mi)

Population (2007)
  - Total: 45,703
  - Density: 223/km^{2} (577/sq mi)
- Time zone: UTC+1 (CET)
  - Summer (DST): UTC+2 (CEST)
- Municipalities: 24

Burgdorf District is a constitutional district in the canton of Bern in Switzerland with its seat at Burgdorf Castle in Burgdorf.

From 1 January 2010, the district lost its administrative power while being replaced by the Emmental (administrative district), whose administrative centre is Langnau im Emmental. Since 2010, it remains a fully recognised district under the law and the Constitution (Art.3 al.2) of the Canton of Berne.

It includes 24 cities and towns in an area of 197 km^{2} (76 sq mi):

| Municipality | Population (01.01.2005) | Area (km²) |
|---|---|---|
| Aefligen | 1,013 | 2.1 |
| Alchenstorf | 548 | 8.6 |
| Bäriswil | 1,036 | 2.8 |
| Burgdorf | 14,757 | 15.6 |
| Ersigen | 1,474 | 8.8 |
| Hasle bei Burgdorf | 2,965 | 21.9 |
| Heimiswil | 1,591 | 23.4 |
| Hellsau | 187 | 1.5 |
| Hindelbank | 2,002 | 6.7 |
| Höchstetten | 282 | 2.6 |
| Kernenried | 448 | 3.3 |
| Kirchberg | 5,450 | 9.0 |
| Koppigen | 2,007 | 6.9 |
| Krauchthal | 2,345 | 19.4 |
| Lyssach | 1,369 | 6.1 |
| Mötschwil | 119 | 2.9 |
| Niederösch | 226 | 4.6 |
| Oberburg | 2,829 | 14.1 |
| Oberösch | 124 | 2.1 |
| Rüdtligen-Alchenflüh | 2,126 | 2.7 |
| Rumendingen | 87 | 2.5 |
| Rüti bei Lyssach | 156 | 6.5 |
| Willadingen | 173 | 2.2 |
| Wynigen | 2,038 | 28.3 |
