= Wil bei Koppigen =

Former municipality in Bern, Switzerland

- Former municipality
- Location of Wil bei Koppigen
- Location within Switzerland Location within Canton of Bern
- Coordinates: 47.1145°N 7.6474°E
- Country: Switzerland
- Canton: Bern
- District: Burgdorf
- Municipality: Alchenstorf

Population (1880)
  - Total: 84
- Time zone: UTC+01:00 (CET)
  - Summer (DST): UTC+02:00 (CEST)
- ISO 3166 code: CH-BE
- Website

Wil bei Koppigen is a former municipality in the Burgdorf District of the canton of Bern, Switzerland. Because of its burden of debt, the very small municipality was incorporated into the municipality of Alchenstorf in 1887.

== History ==
Wil bei Koppigen had 30 inhabitants in 1764, 81 in 1850 and 84 in 1880. The medieval open-field village (Zelgdorf) of Wil on the Wynigenbach, made up of Hinterwil and Vorderwil, shared its ecclesiastical, judicial and manorial affiliation with the parish of Koppigen. In 1503 the wooded pastures shared by Wil, Alchenstorf and Wynigen were divided among the villages and the village boundaries were fixed. The fine rural appearance of the village of Wil bei Koppigen was preserved into the 21st century.

== Bibliography ==
- Heimatbuch des Amtes Burgdorf und der Kirchgemeinden Utzenstorf und Bätterkinden, 2 vols., 1930–1938
- I. Meili-Rigert, Bauinventar der Gemeinde Alchenstorf, 2002

=== Sources ===
- Collection of Swiss Law Sources (SSRQ), BE II/9, 465
