= Emmental =

Emmental may refer to

- Emmental (valley), a valley in Switzerland
- Emmental cheese, a type of cheese that originated in Emmental
- Emmental (administrative district), a district in Switzerland
