= Emmenthal =

Emmenthal may refer to:

- Emmental, the valley of the Emme River in Switzerland
- Emmental cheese, which was originally produced in the Emmental

== See also ==
- Emmental (administrative district)
