= Willadingen =

- Municipality
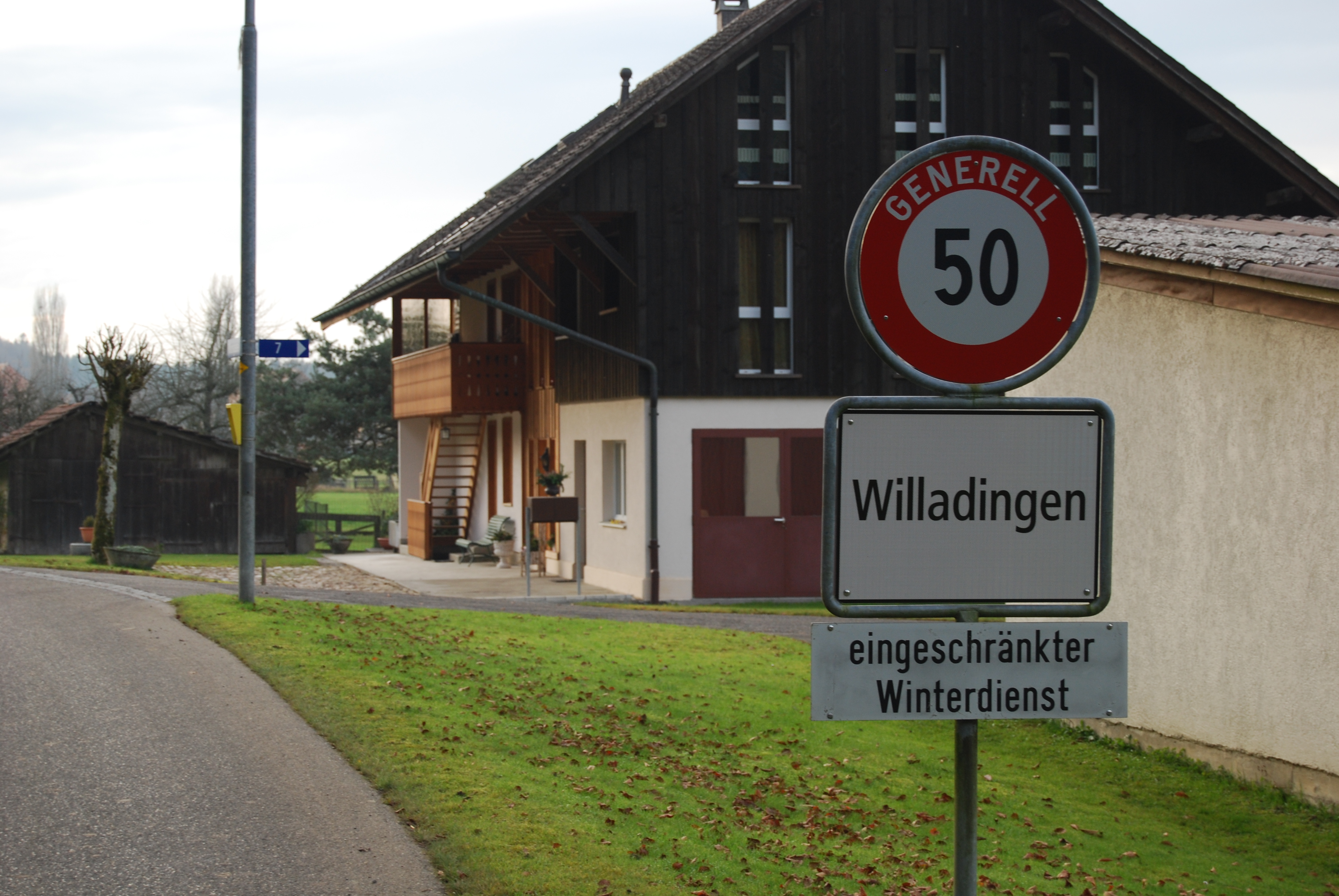
- The entrance to Willadingen village

- Flag Coat of arms
- Location of Willadingen
- Location within Switzerland Location within Canton of Bern
- Coordinates: 47°9′N 7°37′E
- Country: Switzerland
- Canton: Bern
- District: Emmental

Government
  - Executive: Gemeinderat with 5 members
  - Mayor: Gemeindepräsident(in); Ulrich Thomet (as of 2026)

Area
  - Total: 2.2 km^{2} (0.85 sq mi)
- Elevation: 465 m (1,526 ft)

Population (December 2020)
  - Total: 199
  - Density: 90/km^{2} (230/sq mi)
- Time zone: UTC+01:00 (CET)
  - Summer (DST): UTC+02:00 (CEST)
- Postal code: 3425
- SFOS number: 423
- ISO 3166 code: CH-BE
- Surrounded by: Heinrichswil-Winistorf (SO), Höchstetten, Koppigen, Recherswil (SO)
- Website: https://www.willadingen.ch/

Willadingen is a municipality in the administrative district of Emmental in the canton of Bern in Switzerland.

== History ==
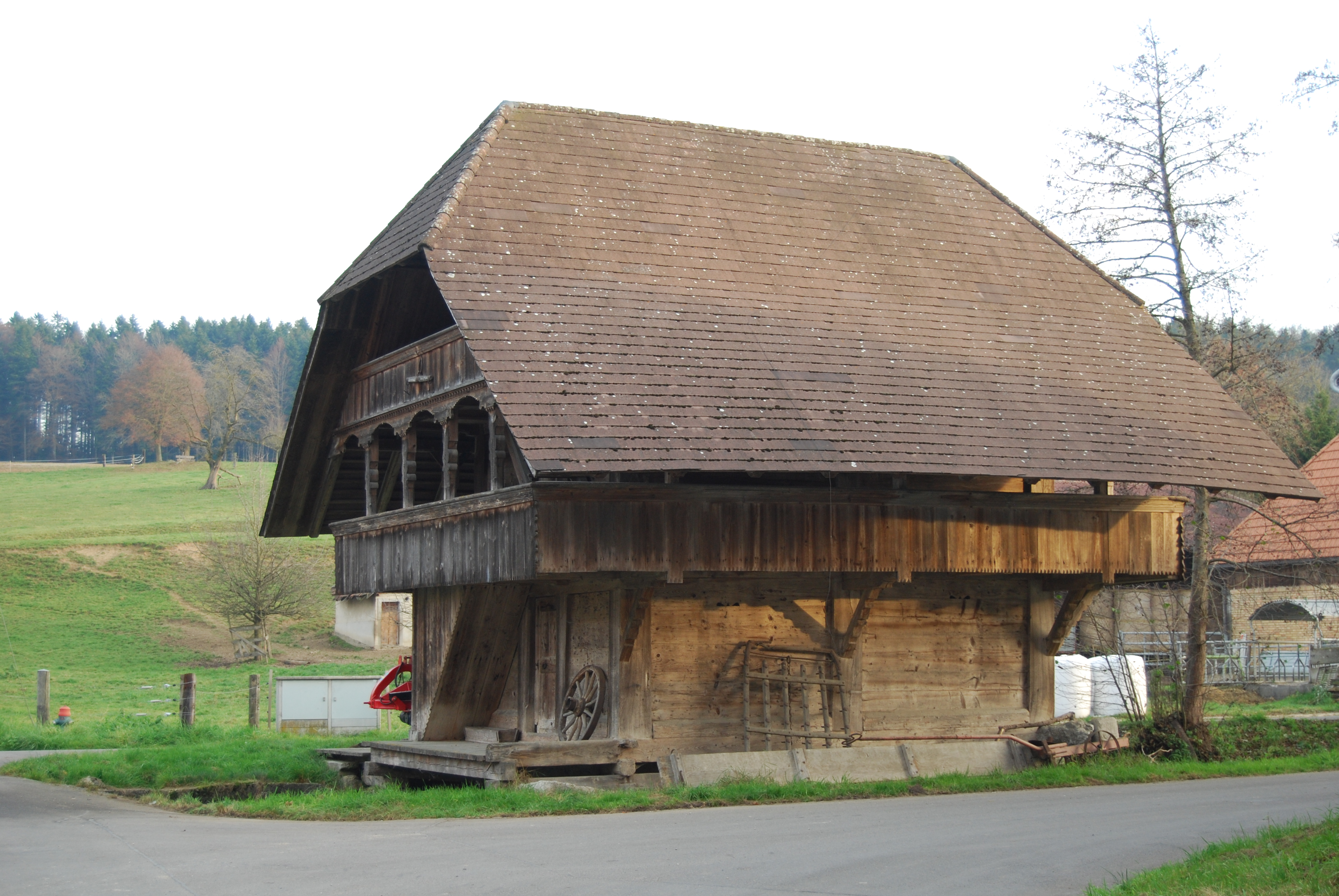
Barn and farmhouse in Willadingen

Willadingen is first mentioned in 1214 as Willedingen.

The oldest evidence of humans in the municipal area are some neolithic flints in the Neumatt area, followed by a grave or a graveyard in Wigglismoos. The small community has always been politically, economically and religiously dependent on Koppigen. Today it is part of the Koppigen school district and parish. The close connection to Koppigen probably came about under Peter of Thorberg who bought land in the village from Ulrich of Urtinen in 1374. After his death in 1397, the Thorberg Charterhouse, which he had helped found, inherited all of his land. After the city of Bern accepted the Protestant Reformation and secularized the Chapterhouse in 1528, Bern acquired the village. Under Bernese rule Willadingen became part of the district of Koppigen.

The rural village has remained mostly agricultural with very little industry. In 2000, almost three-quarters of the working population commuted to jobs in nearby cities.

== Geography ==
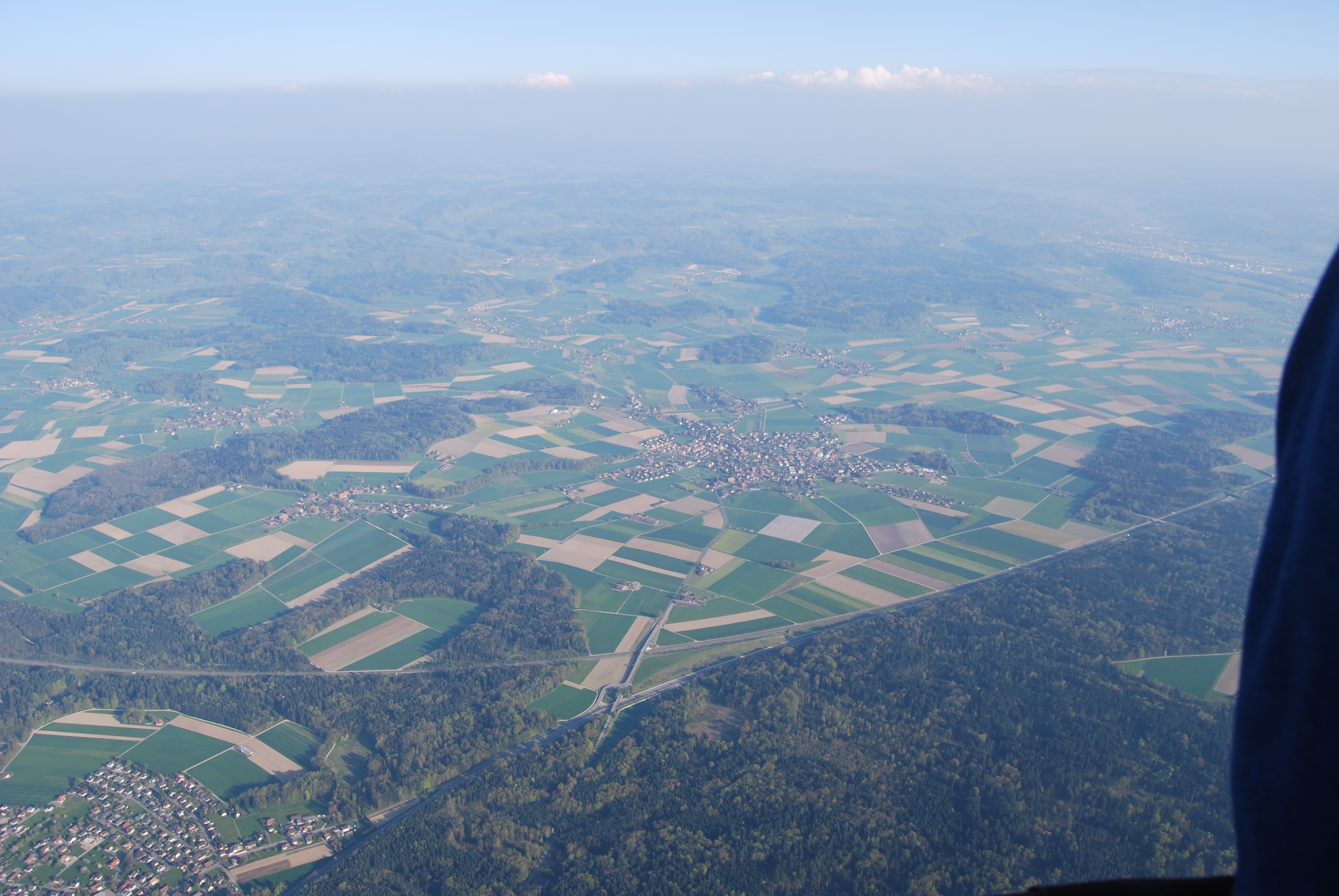
Aerial view of Koppigen. The small village of Willadingen is visible on the left side of Koppigen.

Willadingen has an area of 2.17 km^{2} (0.84 sq mi). Of this area, 1.48 km^{2} (0.57 mi^{2}) or 68.5% is used for agricultural purposes, while 0.61 km^{2} (0.24 mi^{2}) or 28.2% is forested. Of the rest of the land, 0.1 km^{2} (25 acres) or 4.6% is settled (buildings or roads).

Of the built up area, housing and buildings made up 4.2% and transportation infrastructure made up 0.5%. Out of the forested land, all of the forested land area is covered with heavy forests. Of the agricultural land, 51.9% is used for growing crops and 16.7% is pastures.

The municipality is located along the Ösch river, on the border with the Canton of Solothurn. It consists of the village of Willadingen, the hamlets of Mösli and Moosgasse and the new housing development of Lischmatt.

On 31 December 2009 Amtsbezirk Burgdorf, the municipality's former district, was dissolved. On the following day, 1 January 2010, it joined the newly created Verwaltungskreis Emmental.

== Coat of arms ==
The blazon of the municipal coat of arms is Argent a Bull Sable horned and hoofed Or.

== Demographics ==
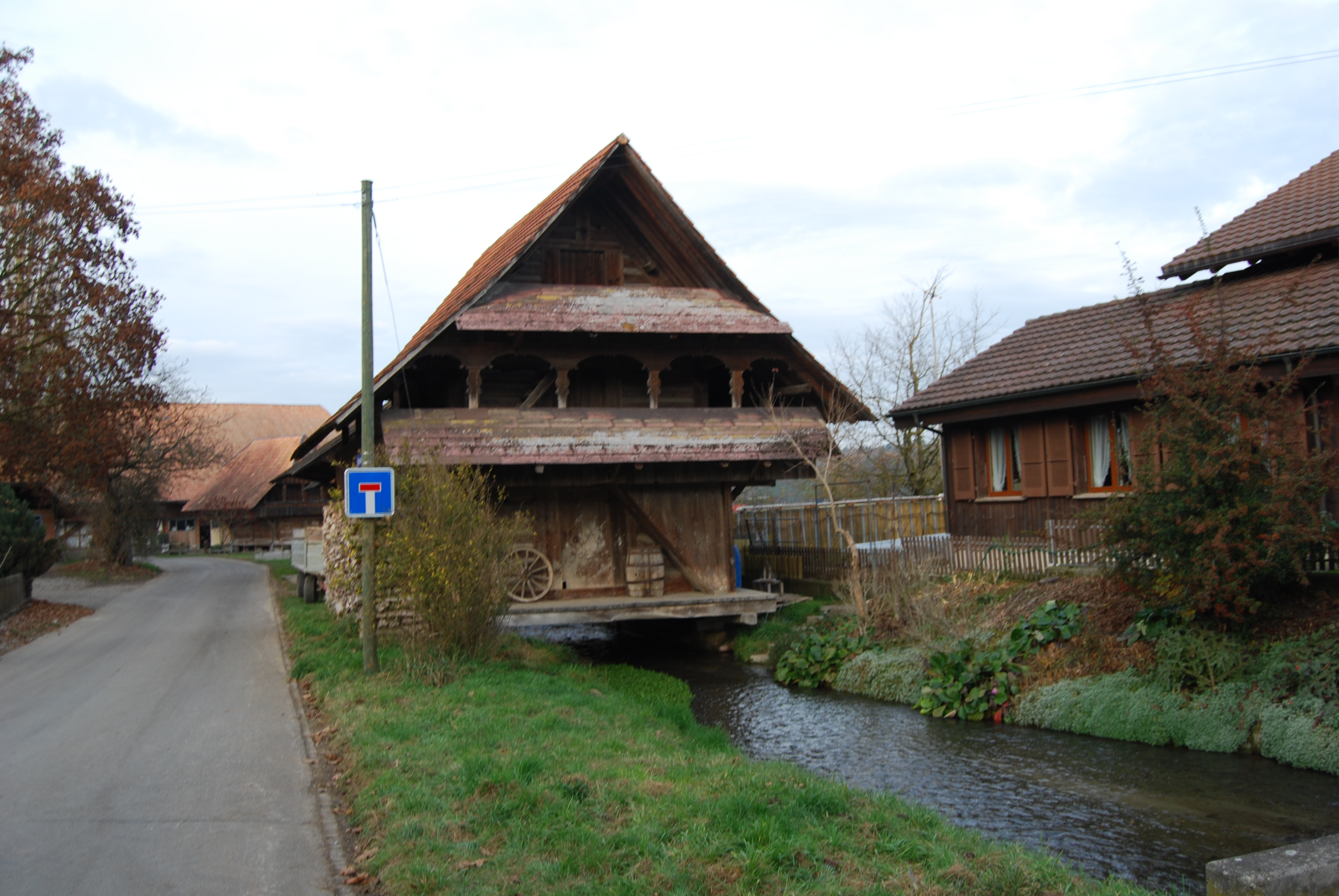
Barn over the Ösch river in Willadingen

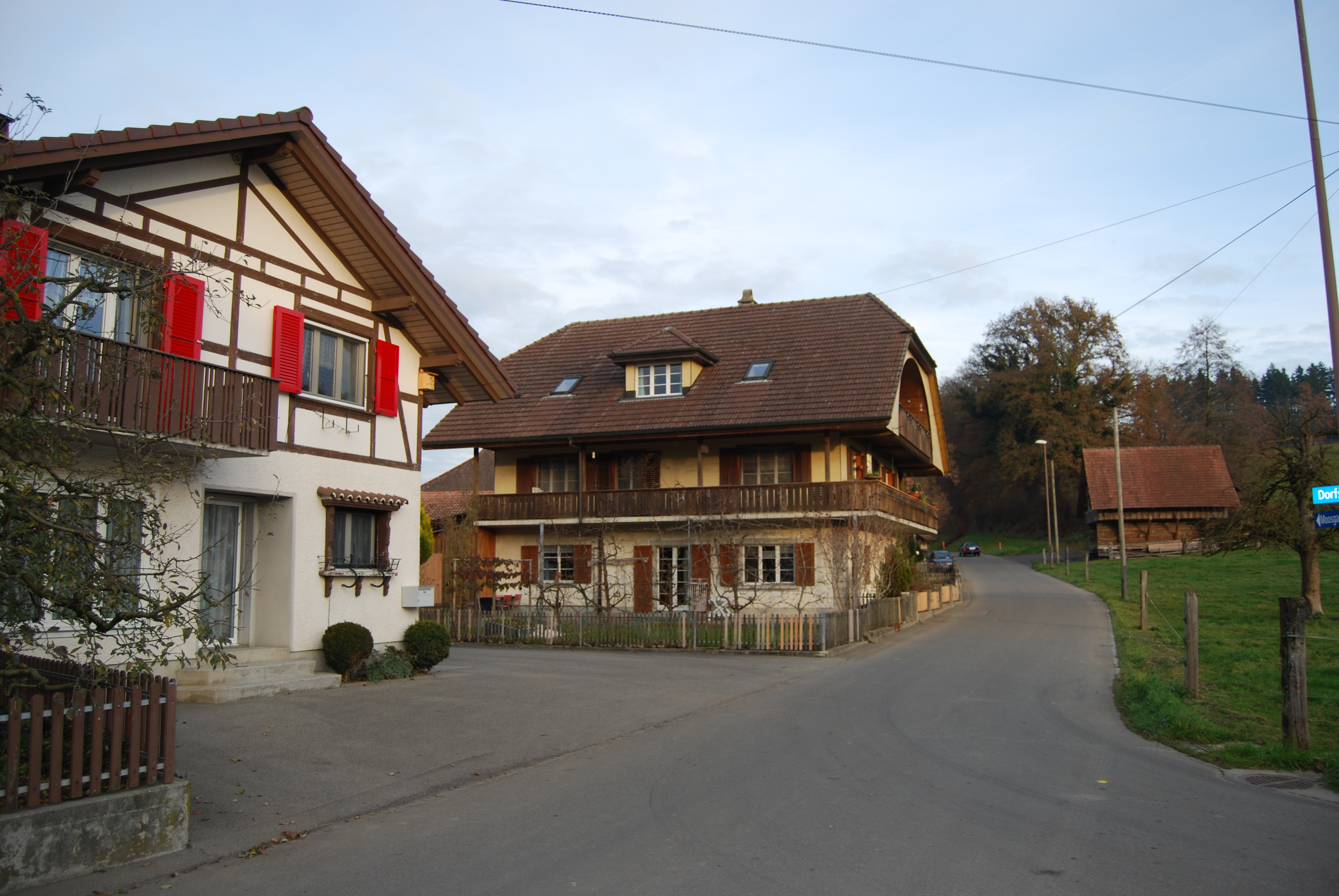
Houses in Willadingen

Willadingen has a population (as of December 2020) of 199. As of 2010, 1.0% of the population are resident foreign nationals. Over the last 10 years (2000–2010) the population has changed at a rate of 11.3%. Migration accounted for 15.3%, while births and deaths accounted for 0.6%.

Most of the population (as of 2000) speaks German (169 or 98.8%) as their first language. There is one English speaker and one Portuguese speaker.

As of 2008, the population was 50.5% male and 49.5% female. The population was made up of 99 Swiss men (50.5% of the population) and (0.0%) non-Swiss men. There were 95 Swiss women (48.5%) and 2 (1.0%) non-Swiss women. Of the population in the municipality, 60 or about 35.1% were born in Willadingen and lived there in 2000. There were 81 or 47.4% who were born in the same canton, while 25 or 14.6% were born somewhere else in Switzerland, and 5 or 2.9% were born outside of Switzerland.

As of 2010, children and teenagers (0–19 years old) make up 18.9% of the population, while adults (20–64 years old) make up 62.2% and seniors (over 64 years old) make up 18.9%.

As of 2000, there were 67 people who were single and never married in the municipality. There were 79 married individuals, 13 widows or widowers and 12 individuals who are divorced.

As of 2000, there were 19 households that consist of only one person and 3 households with five or more people. In 2000, a total of 72 apartments (88.9% of the total) were permanently occupied, while 5 apartments (6.2%) were seasonally occupied and 4 apartments (4.9%) were empty. As of 2010, the construction rate of new housing units was 5.1 new units per 1000 residents. The vacancy rate for the municipality, in 2011, was 1.08%.

The historical population is given in the following chart:

== Sights ==
The entire village of Willadingen is designated as part of the Inventory of Swiss Heritage Sites.

== Politics ==
In the 2011 federal election the most popular party was the Swiss People's Party (SVP) which received 45% of the vote. The next three most popular parties were the Conservative Democratic Party (BDP) (21.1%), the Social Democratic Party (SP) (11.6%) and the Green Liberal Party (GLP) (5.9%). In the federal election, a total of 98 votes were cast, and the voter turnout was 59.8%.

== Economy ==
As of 2011, Willadingen had an unemployment rate of 1.1%. As of 2008, there were a total of 38 people employed in the municipality. Of these, there were 22 people employed in the primary economic sector and about 8 businesses involved in this sector. 9 people were employed in the secondary sector and there were 3 businesses in this sector. 7 people were employed in the tertiary sector, with 2 businesses in this sector.

In 2008 there were a total of 28 full-time equivalent jobs. The number of jobs in the primary sector was 15, all in agriculture. The number of jobs in the secondary sector was 8 of which 1 was in manufacturing and 7 were in construction. The number of jobs in the tertiary sector was 5. In the tertiary sector; 1 was in trade, sale or the repair of motor vehicles and 4 were in a hotel or restaurant.

In 2000, there were 10 workers who commuted into the municipality and 76 workers who commuted away. The municipality is a net exporter of workers, with about 7.6 workers leaving the municipality for every one entering. Of the working population, 5.8% used public transportation to get to work, and 59.2% used a private car.

== Religion ==
From the 2000 census, 9 or 5.3% were Roman Catholic, while 153 or 89.5% belonged to the Swiss Reformed Church. 8 (or about 4.68% of the population) belonged to no church, are agnostic or atheist, and 1 individuals (or about 0.58% of the population) did not answer the question.

== Education ==
In Willadingen about 65 or (38.0%) of the population have completed non-mandatory upper secondary education, and 35 or (20.5%) have completed additional higher education (either university or a Fachhochschule). Of the 35 who completed tertiary schooling, 71.4% were Swiss men, 28.6% were Swiss women.

During the 2010–11 school year, there were no students attending school in Willadingen.

As of 2000, there were 19 students from Willadingen who attended schools outside the municipality.
