= Höchstetten, Switzerland =

Höchstetten
- Municipality
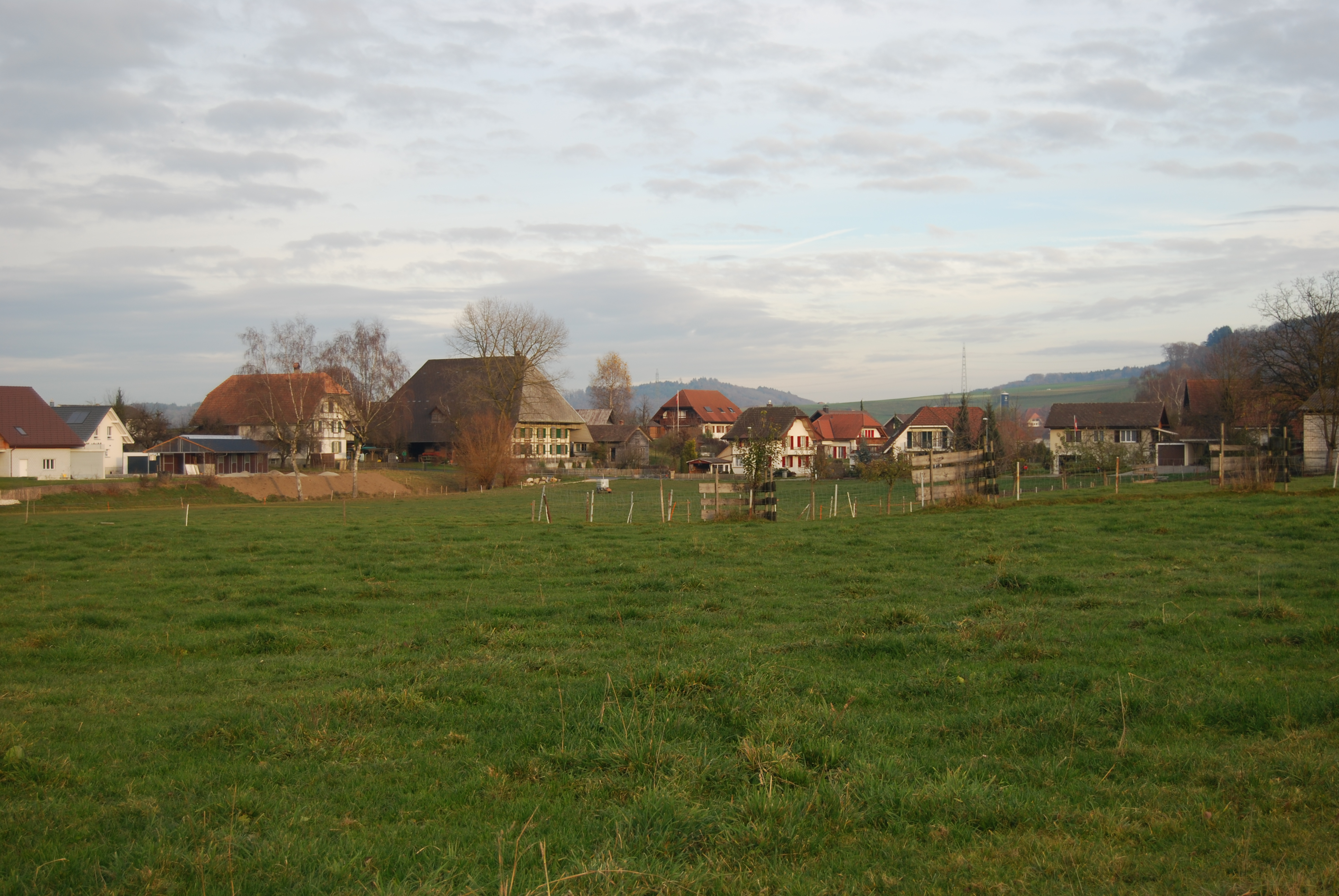
- Höchstetten village

- Flag Coat of arms
- Location of Höchstetten
- Location within Switzerland Location within Canton of Bern
- Coordinates: 47°9′N 7°38′E
- Country: Switzerland
- Canton: Bern
- District: Emmental

Government
  - Executive: Gemeinderat with 5 members
  - Mayor: Gemeindepräsident(in); Gregor Derks (as of 2026)

Area
  - Total: 2.6 km^{2} (1.0 sq mi)
- Elevation: 480 m (1,570 ft)

Population (December 2020)
  - Total: 279
  - Density: 110/km^{2} (280/sq mi)
- Time zone: UTC+01:00 (CET)
  - Summer (DST): UTC+02:00 (CEST)
- Postal code: 3429
- SFOS number: 410
- ISO 3166 code: CH-BE
- Surrounded by: Alchenstorf, Heinrichswil-Winistorf (SO), Hellsau, Koppigen, Willadingen
- Website: www.hoechstetten.ch

Höchstetten is a municipality in the administrative district of Emmental in the canton of Bern in Switzerland.

== History ==
Höchstetten is first mentioned in 1360 as Hönstetten.

The remains of Mesolithic and Neolithic settlements have been found in the Sandhubel, Rüteliacker and Linzifeld areas of Höchstetten. During the Early Middle Ages there was a nearby settlement that left graves at Holenmatt. Throughout its history, the small village of Höchstetten was dependent on the larger village of Koppigen. Starting in the 1820s it joined together with Hellsau to share a primary school. Today, the two communities share the Moos school house, which was built in 1976. The local economy is based on agriculture and small businesses with many residents commuting to nearby towns for work.

== Geography ==
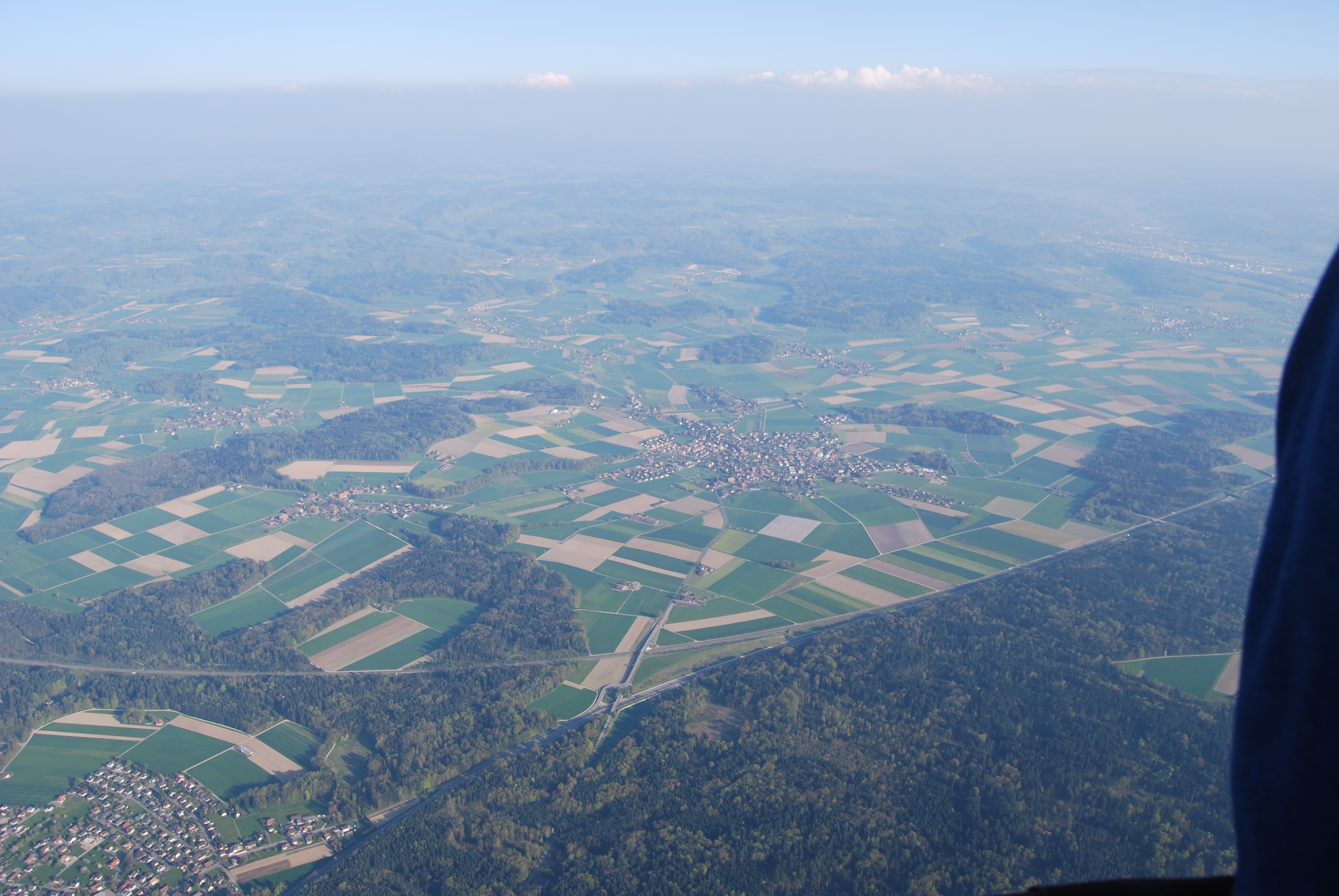
Aerial view of Höchstetten and surrounding villages. Koppigen is visible in the center, Hellsau is at the left border in the background with Höchstetten just to the right of Hellsau.

Höchstetten has an area of 2.64 km^{2} (1.02 sq mi). Of this area, 1.87 km^{2} (0.72 mi^{2}) or 70.8% is used for agricultural purposes, while 0.52 km^{2} (0.20 mi^{2}) or 19.7% is forested. Of the rest of the land, 0.19 km^{2} (0.073 mi^{2}) or 7.2% is settled (buildings or roads), 0.02 km^{2} (4.9 acres) or 0.8% is either rivers or lakes.

Of the built up area, housing and buildings made up 5.7% and transportation infrastructure made up 1.1%. Out of the forested land, all of the forested land area is covered with heavy forests. Of the agricultural land, 59.5% is used for growing crops and 10.6% is pastures. All the water in the municipality is flowing water.

The municipality is located on the Bern-Zürich highway.

On 31 December 2009 Amtsbezirk Burgdorf, the municipality's former district, was dissolved. On the following day, 1 January 2010, it joined the newly created Verwaltungskreis Emmental.

== Coat of arms ==
The blazon of the municipal coat of arms is Argent on a Chief and Pale Gules a Mullet Or.

== Demographics ==
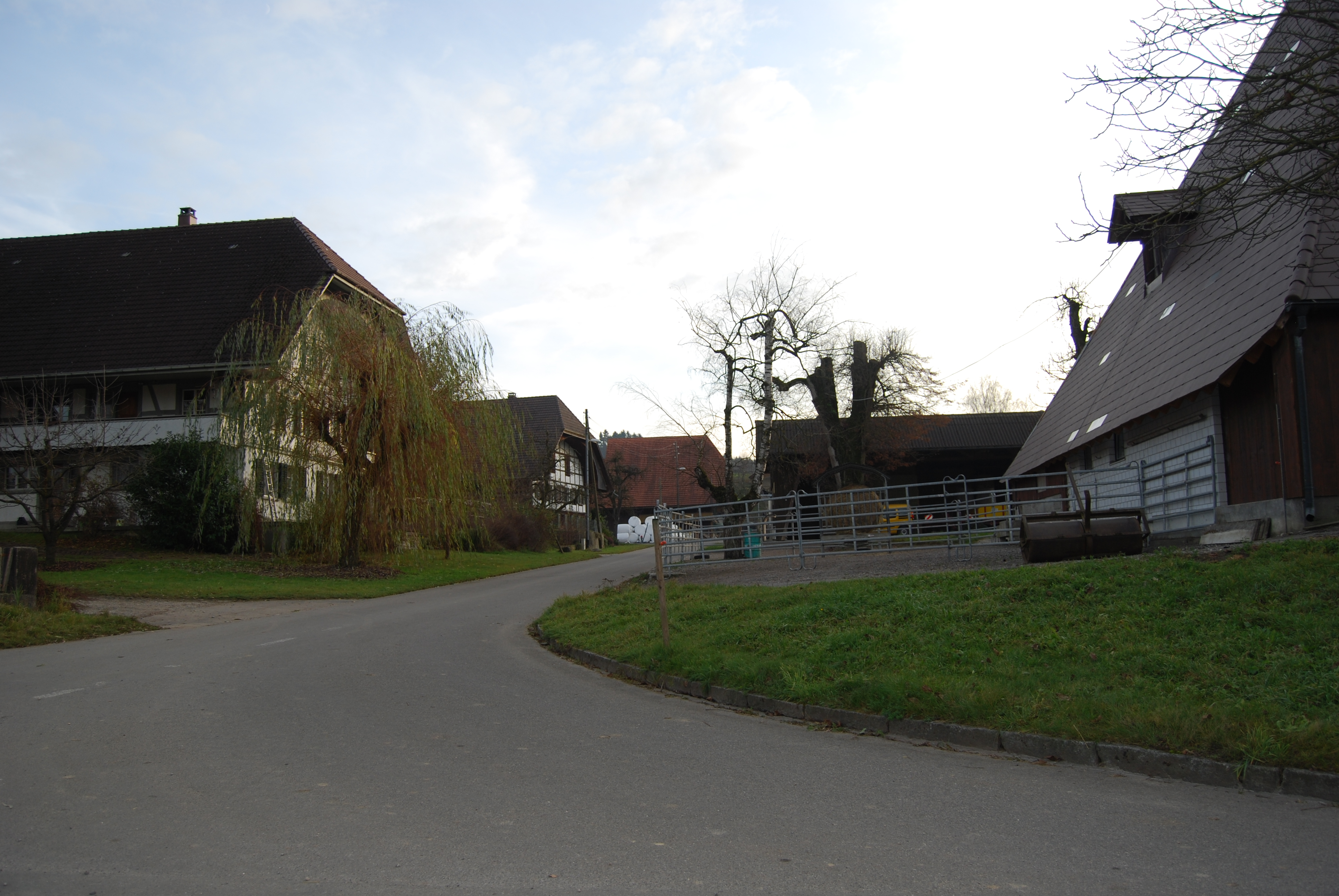
Farm houses in Höchstetten

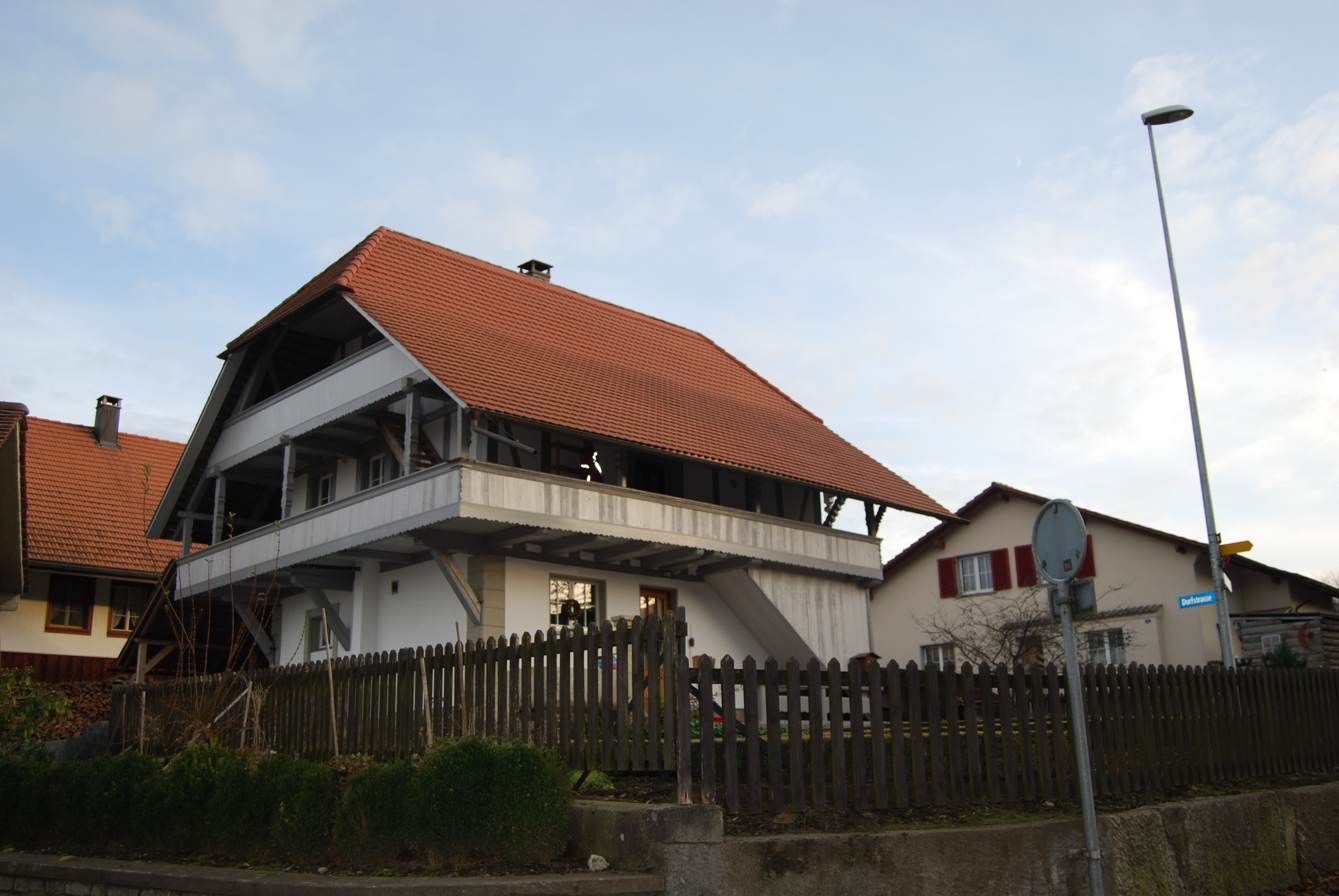
Houses in the village

Höchstetten has a population (as of December 2020) of 279. As of 2010, 3.1% of the population are resident foreign nationals. Over the last 10 years (2000-2010) the population has changed at a rate of 1.6%. Migration accounted for 4%, while births and deaths accounted for 2%.

Most of the population (as of 2000) speaks German (250 or 98.0%) as their first language, while 2 people speak French and the rest speak other European languages.

As of 2008, the population was 49.0% male and 51.0% female. The population was made up of 122 Swiss men (47.8% of the population) and 3 (1.2%) non-Swiss men. There were 125 Swiss women (49.0%) and 5 (2.0%) non-Swiss women. Of the population in the municipality, 102 or about 40.0% were born in Höchstetten and lived there in 2000. There were 101 or 39.6% who were born in the same canton, while 41 or 16.1% were born somewhere else in Switzerland, and 6 or 2.4% were born outside of Switzerland.

As of 2010, children and teenagers (0–19 years old) make up 22% of the population, while adults (20–64 years old) make up 55.7% and seniors (over 64 years old) make up 22.4%.

As of 2000, there were 109 people who were single and never married in the municipality. There were 119 married individuals, 15 widows or widowers and 12 individuals who are divorced.

As of 2000, there were 17 households that consist of only one person and 11 households with five or more people. In 2000, a total of 84 apartments (79.2% of the total) were permanently occupied, while 22 apartments (20.8%) were seasonally occupied.

The historical population is given in the following chart:

== Politics ==
In the 2011 federal election the most popular party was the Swiss People's Party (SVP) which received 54.7% of the vote. The next three most popular parties were the Conservative Democratic Party (BDP) (20.8%), the Social Democratic Party (SP) (10%) and the Green Party (4.3%). In the federal election, a total of 167 votes were cast, and the voter turnout was 48.1%.

== Economy ==
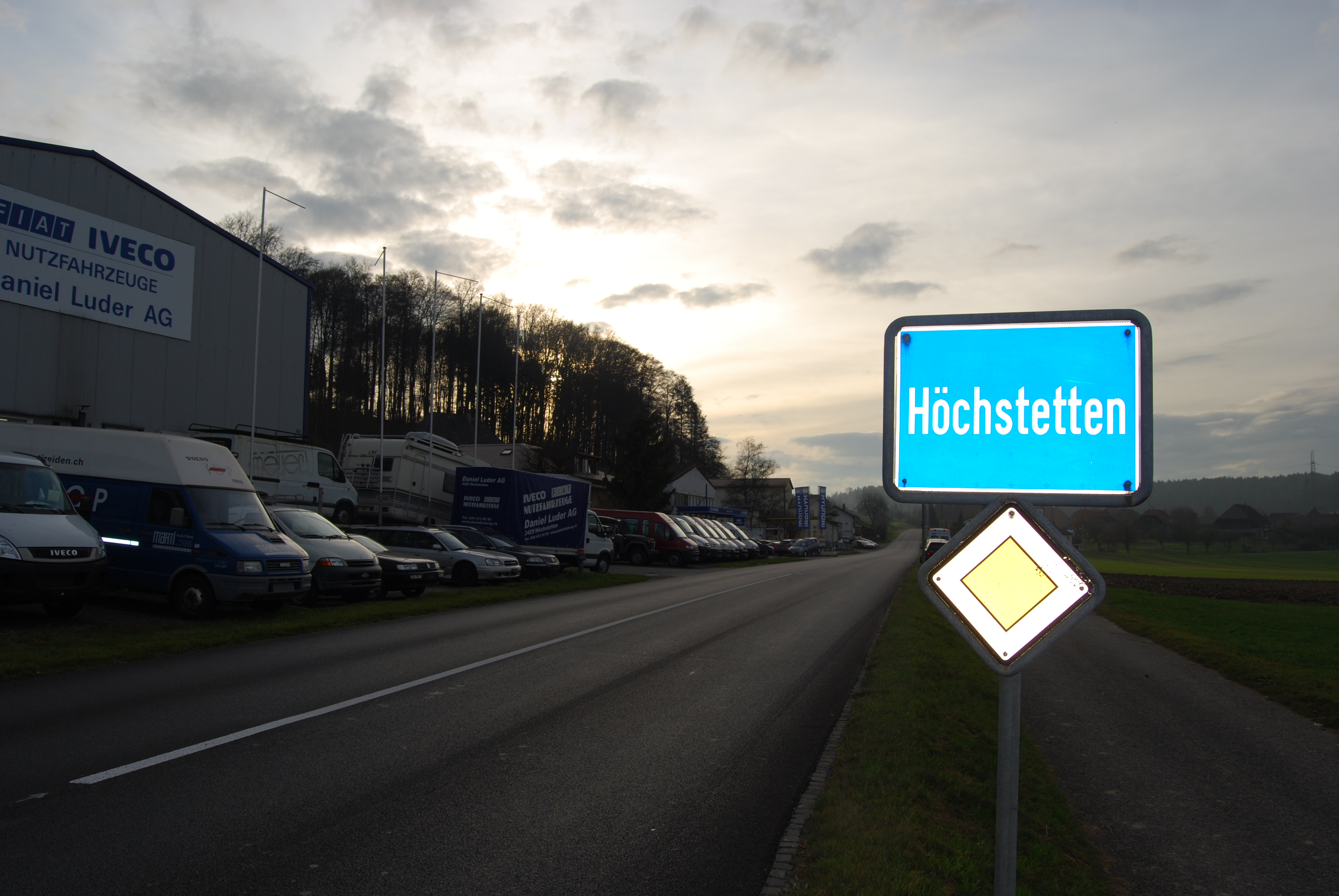
Entrance to the village with a vehicle dealership on the left side

As of 2011, Höchstetten had an unemployment rate of 2.48%. As of 2008, there were a total of 83 people employed in the municipality. Of these, there were 37 people employed in the primary economic sector and about 13 businesses involved in this sector. 17 people were employed in the secondary sector and there were 5 businesses in this sector. 29 people were employed in the tertiary sector, with 8 businesses in this sector.

In 2008 there were a total of 61 full-time equivalent jobs. The number of jobs in the primary sector was 27, all in agriculture. The number of jobs in the secondary sector was 14 of which 11 or (78.6%) were in manufacturing and 4 (28.6%) were in construction. The number of jobs in the tertiary sector was 20. In the tertiary sector; 15 or 75.0% were in wholesale or retail sales or the repair of motor vehicles, 1 was in a hotel or restaurant and 2 were in health care.

In 2000, there were 32 workers who commuted into the municipality and 92 workers who commuted away. The municipality is a net exporter of workers, with about 2.9 workers leaving the municipality for every one entering. Of the working population, 3.4% used public transportation to get to work, and 56.2% used a private car.

== Religion ==
From the 2000 census, 12 or 4.7% were Roman Catholic, while 211 or 82.7% belonged to the Swiss Reformed Church. Of the rest of the population, there were 24 individuals (or about 9.41% of the population) who belonged to another Christian church. There was 1 individual who was Islamic. There were 2 individuals who were Buddhist. 12 (or about 4.71% of the population) belonged to no church, are agnostic or atheist, and 5 individuals (or about 1.96% of the population) did not answer the question.

== Education ==
In Höchstetten about 100 or (39.2%) of the population have completed non-mandatory upper secondary education, and 23 or (9.0%) have completed additional higher education (either university or a Fachhochschule). Of the 23 who completed tertiary schooling, 60.9% were Swiss men, 39.1% were Swiss women.

During the 2010-11 school year, there were no students attending school in Höchstetten.

As of 2000, there were 29 students from Höchstetten who attended schools outside the municipality.
