= Heimiswil =

- Municipality
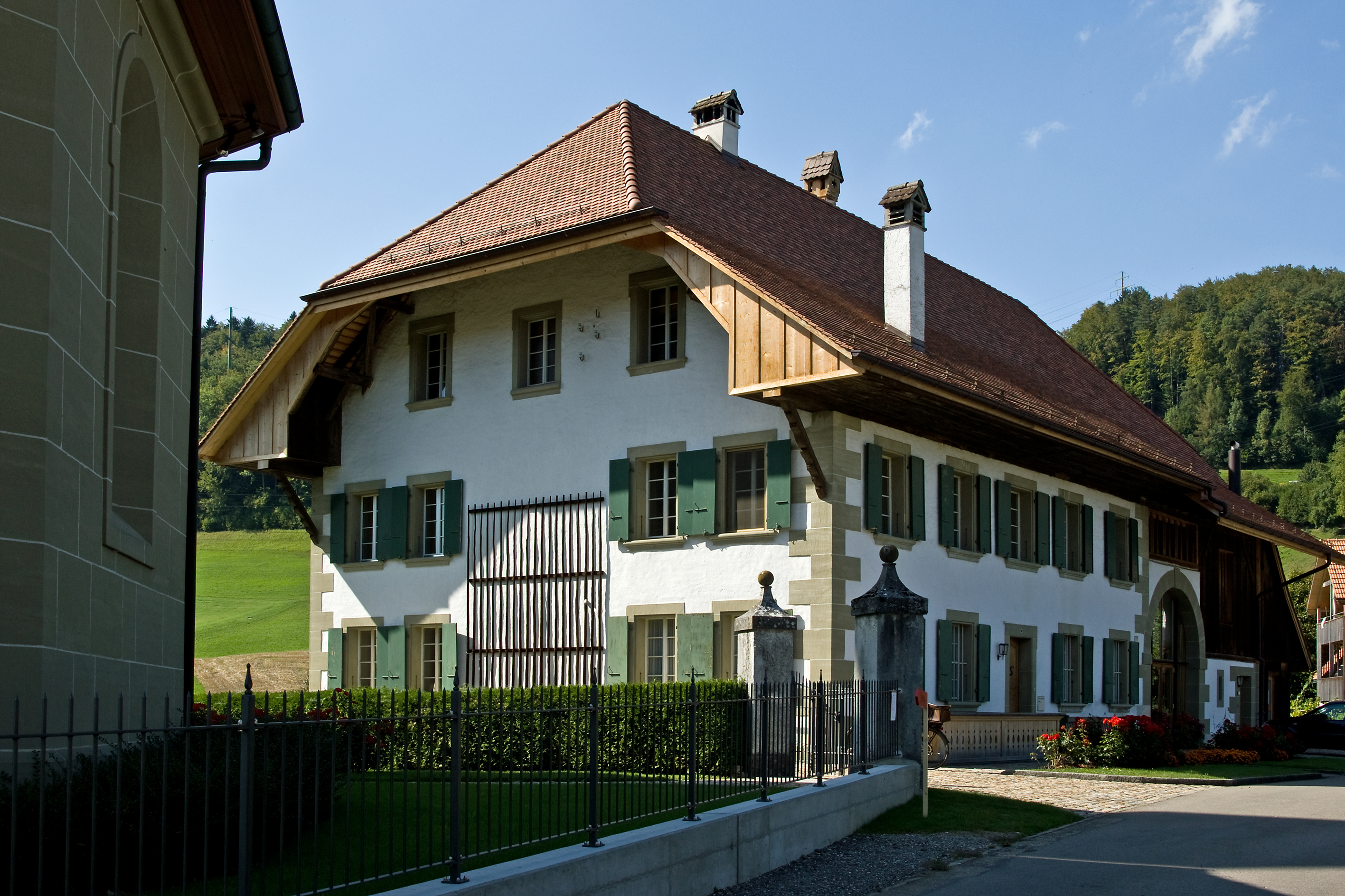
- Heimiswil village rectory and prebendary barn

- Flag Coat of arms
- Location of Heimiswil
- Location within Switzerland Location within Canton of Bern
- Coordinates: 47°4′N 7°40′E
- Country: Switzerland
- Canton: Bern
- District: Emmental

Government
  - Executive: Gemeinderat with 7 members
  - Mayor: Gemeindepräsident(in); Peter Widmer (as of 2026)

Area
  - Total: 23.4 km^{2} (9.0 sq mi)
- Elevation: 615 m (2,018 ft)

Population (December 2020)
  - Total: 1,632
  - Density: 69.7/km^{2} (181/sq mi)
- Time zone: UTC+01:00 (CET)
  - Summer (DST): UTC+02:00 (CEST)
- Postal code: 3412
- SFOS number: 407
- ISO 3166 code: CH-BE
- Surrounded by: Affoltern im Emmental, Burgdorf, Hasle bei Burgdorf, Rüegsau, Wynigen
- Website: www.heimiswil.ch

Heimiswil is a municipality in the administrative district of Emmental in the canton of Bern in Switzerland.

== History ==
Heimiswil is first mentioned in 1250 as Heimoltswiler.

During the High Middle Ages there was an earthen fortification at Tschoggen. During the 13th and 14th centuries, the Counts of Kyburg owned land in Heimiswil. In 1402 they sold their right to the low court to the city of Burgdorf. Eventually the court was held at the Gasthof Löwen, which was first mentioned in 1668.

The Zähringen or Kyburg family built a family church in the village before 1275. In 1340-41 the town of Burgdorf inherited the position of patron over the church and the right to appoint the church's priest, which it used to support a hospital. From then on the hospital chapel was also the pastor over Heimiswil. In 1703-04, Bern allowed the villagers to build their own church and form a parish.

During the 18th century, Burgdorf actively encouraged Heimiswil to remain an agricultural village. For example, in 1705 they banned forges or metalworkers in the village. Even today the municipality remains agricultural and rural with only a few small businesses.

== Geography ==
Aerial view by Walter Mittelholzer (1923)

Heimiswil has an area of 23.36 km^{2} (9.02 sq mi). Of this area, 14.27 km^{2} (5.51 mi^{2}) or 61.1% is used for agricultural purposes, while 7.88 km^{2} (3.04 mi^{2}) or 33.7% is forested. Of the rest of the land, 1.18 km^{2} (0.46 mi^{2}) or 5.1% is settled (buildings or roads), 0.04 km^{2} (9.9 acres) or 0.2% is either rivers or lakes.

Of the built up area, housing and buildings made up 3.0% and transportation infrastructure made up 1.7%. Out of the forested land, 32.6% of the total land area is heavily forested and 1.2% is covered with orchards or small clusters of trees. Of the agricultural land, 18.3% is used for growing crops and 40.7% is pastures, while 2.1% is used for orchards or vine crops. All the water in the municipality is flowing water.

The municipality sprawls across the hilly land between the Heimiswilgraben on the Emme river and the Wynigen and Känerich valleys. It consists of the villages of Heimiswil, Busswil, Berg (with Kaltacker), Rotenbaum (with Lueg and Rinderbach) along with scattered hamlets and farm houses as well as the exclave of Hirsegg.

On 31 December 2009 Amtsbezirk Burgdorf, the municipality's former district, was dissolved. On the following day, 1 January 2010, it joined the newly created Verwaltungskreis Emmental.

== Coat of arms ==
The blazon of the municipal coat of arms is Or a Yew Tree Vert fructed Gules issuant from a Mount of 3 Coupeaux of the second.

== Demographics ==
Heimiswil has a population (as of December 2020) of 1,632. As of 2010, 4.3% of the population are resident foreign nationals. Over the last 10 years (2000-2010) the population has changed at a rate of 3.2%. Migration accounted for 3.4%, while births and deaths accounted for 0.4%.

Most of the population (as of 2000) speaks German (1,525 or 98.8%) as their first language, French is the second most common (4 or 0.3%) and Dutch is the third (3 or 0.2%). There is 1 person who speaks Italian.

As of 2008, the population was 50.7% male and 49.3% female. The population was made up of 795 Swiss men (48.6% of the population) and 34 (2.1%) non-Swiss men. There were 771 Swiss women (47.1%) and 36 (2.2%) non-Swiss women. Of the population in the municipality, 748 or about 48.5% were born in Heimiswil and lived there in 2000. There were 563 or 36.5% who were born in the same canton, while 137 or 8.9% were born somewhere else in Switzerland, and 34 or 2.2% were born outside of Switzerland.

As of 2010, children and teenagers (0–19 years old) make up 22.2% of the population, while adults (20–64 years old) make up 59% and seniors (over 64 years old) make up 18.8%.

As of 2000, there were 654 people who were single and never married in the municipality. There were 770 married individuals, 73 widows or widowers and 46 individuals who are divorced.

As of 2000, there were 159 households that consist of only one person and 63 households with five or more people. In 2000, a total of 578 apartments (85.1% of the total) were permanently occupied, while 75 apartments (11.0%) were seasonally occupied and 26 apartments (3.8%) were empty. As of 2010, the construction rate of new housing units was 2.4 new units per 1000 residents. The vacancy rate for the municipality, in 2011, was 1.97%.

The historical population is given in the following chart:

== Heritage sites of national significance ==
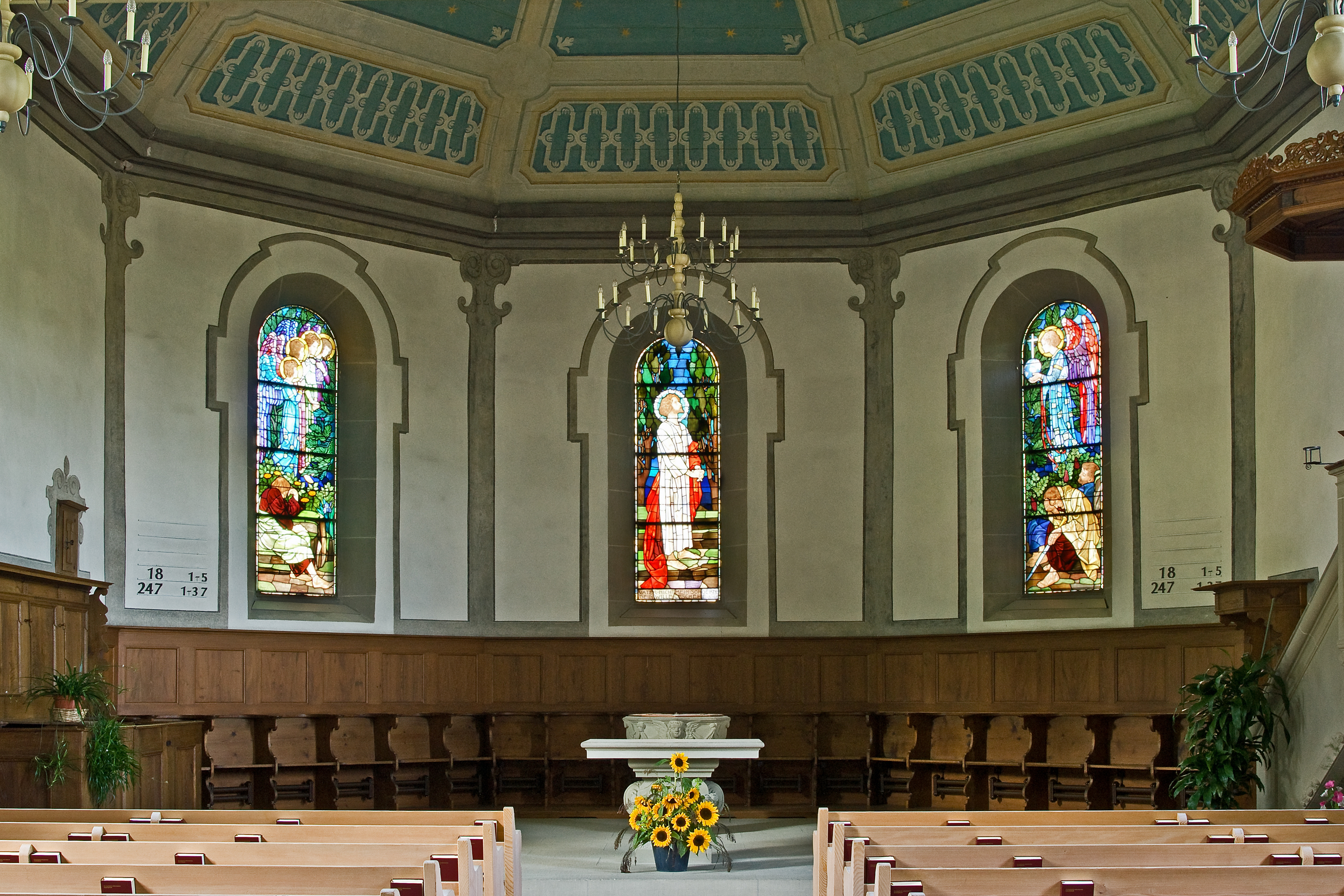
Interior of the Reformed church of Heimiswil

The Eidgenössisches Mikrofilmarchiv (Federal Microfilm Archive) and the church and rectory are listed as Swiss heritage site of national significance. The entire hamlet of Guetisbergand is part of the Inventory of Swiss Heritage Sites.

== Politics ==
In the 2011 federal election the most popular party was the Swiss People's Party (SVP) which received 49.4% of the vote. The next three most popular parties were the Conservative Democratic Party of Switzerland (BDP) (13%), the Social Democratic Party of Switzerland (SP) (11.4%) and the Federal Democratic Union of Switzerland (EDU) (6.4%). In the federal election, a total of 628 votes were cast, and the voter turnout was 50.3%.

== Economy ==
As of 2011, Heimiswil had an unemployment rate of 1.67%. As of 2008, there were a total of 521 people employed in the municipality. Of these, there were 314 people employed in the primary economic sector and about 110 businesses involved in this sector. 61 people were employed in the secondary sector and there were 15 businesses in this sector. 146 people were employed in the tertiary sector, with 22 businesses in this sector.

In 2008 there were a total of 345 full-time equivalent jobs. The number of jobs in the primary sector was 199, all of which were in agriculture. The number of jobs in the secondary sector was 53 of which 26 or (49.1%) were in manufacturing and 27 (50.9%) were in construction. The number of jobs in the tertiary sector was 93. In the tertiary sector; 7 or 7.5% were in wholesale or retail sales or the repair of motor vehicles, 4 or 4.3% were in the movement and storage of goods, 48 or 51.6% were in a hotel or restaurant, 2 or 2.2% were technical professionals or scientists, 13 or 14.0% were in education and 7 or 7.5% were in health care.

In 2000, there were 88 workers who commuted into the municipality and 516 workers who commuted away. The municipality is a net exporter of workers, with about 5.9 workers leaving the municipality for every one entering. Of the working population, 8% used public transportation to get to work, and 52.5% used a private car.

== Religion ==
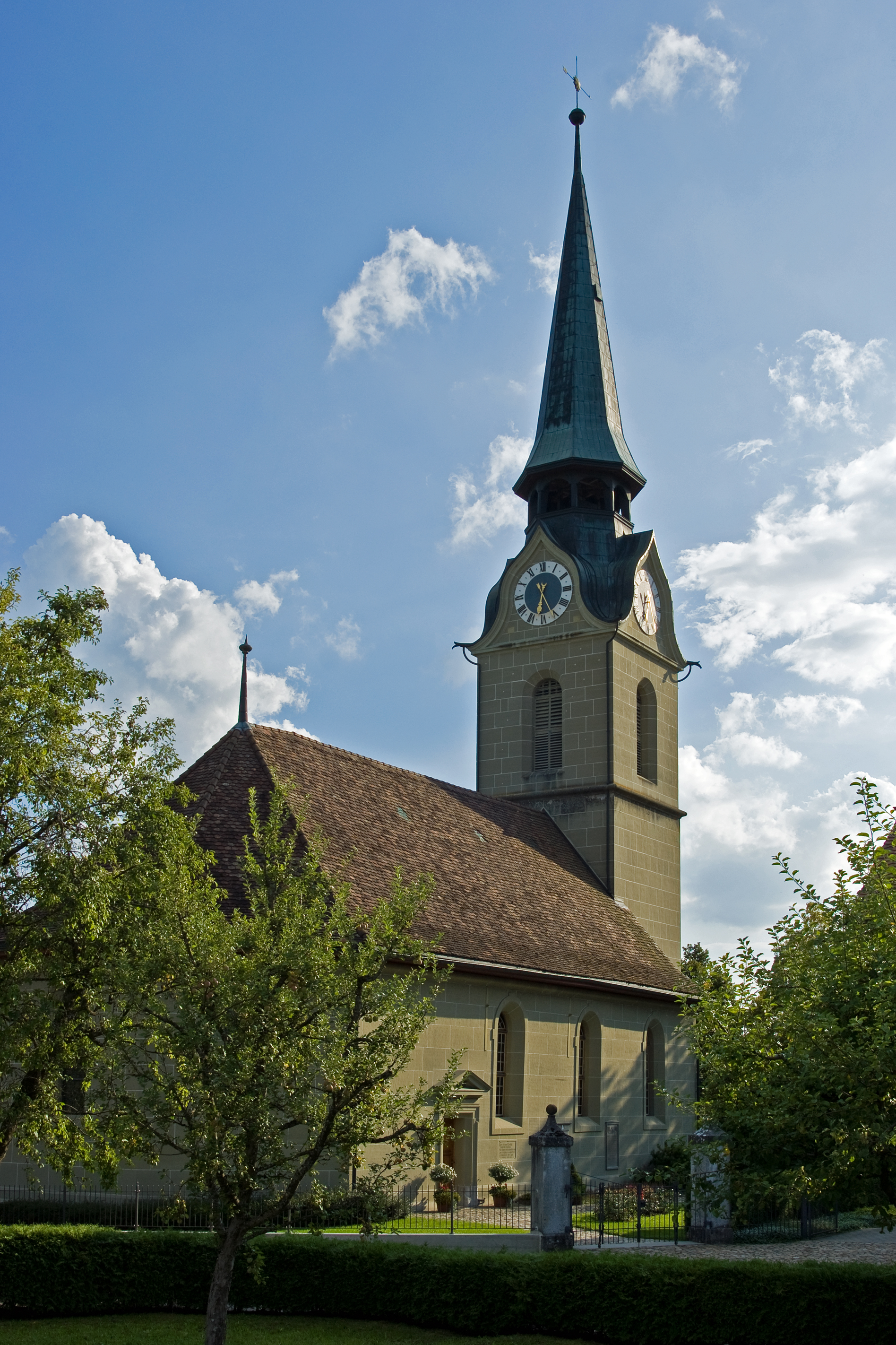
Heimiswil village church

From the 2000 census, 51 or 3.3% were Roman Catholic, while 1,306 or 84.6% belonged to the Swiss Reformed Church. Of the rest of the population, there was 1 individual who belongs to the Christian Catholic Church, and there were 67 individuals (or about 4.34% of the population) who belonged to another Christian church. There were 5 (or about 0.32% of the population) who were Islamic. There was 1 person who was Buddhist, 1 person who was Hindu and 1 individual who belonged to another church. 92 (or about 5.96% of the population) belonged to no church, are agnostic or atheist, and 51 individuals (or about 3.31% of the population) did not answer the question.

== Education ==
In Heimiswil about 599 or (38.8%) of the population have completed non-mandatory upper secondary education, and 161 or (10.4%) have completed additional higher education (either university or a Fachhochschule). Of the 161 who completed tertiary schooling, 63.4% were Swiss men, 32.3% were Swiss women, 3.1% were non-Swiss men.

The Canton of Bern school system provides one year of non-obligatory Kindergarten, followed by six years of Primary school. This is followed by three years of obligatory lower Secondary school where the students are separated according to ability and aptitude. Following the lower Secondary students may attend additional schooling or they may enter an apprenticeship.

During the 2010-11 school year, there were a total of 170 students attending classes in Heimiswil. There were 2 kindergarten classes with a total of 36 students and 6 primary classes with 116 students. There was one lower secondary class with a total of 18 students. and 5.6% have a different mother language than the classroom language.

As of 2000, there were 26 students in Heimiswil who came from another municipality, while 82 residents attended schools outside the municipality.
