= Hellsau =

- Municipality
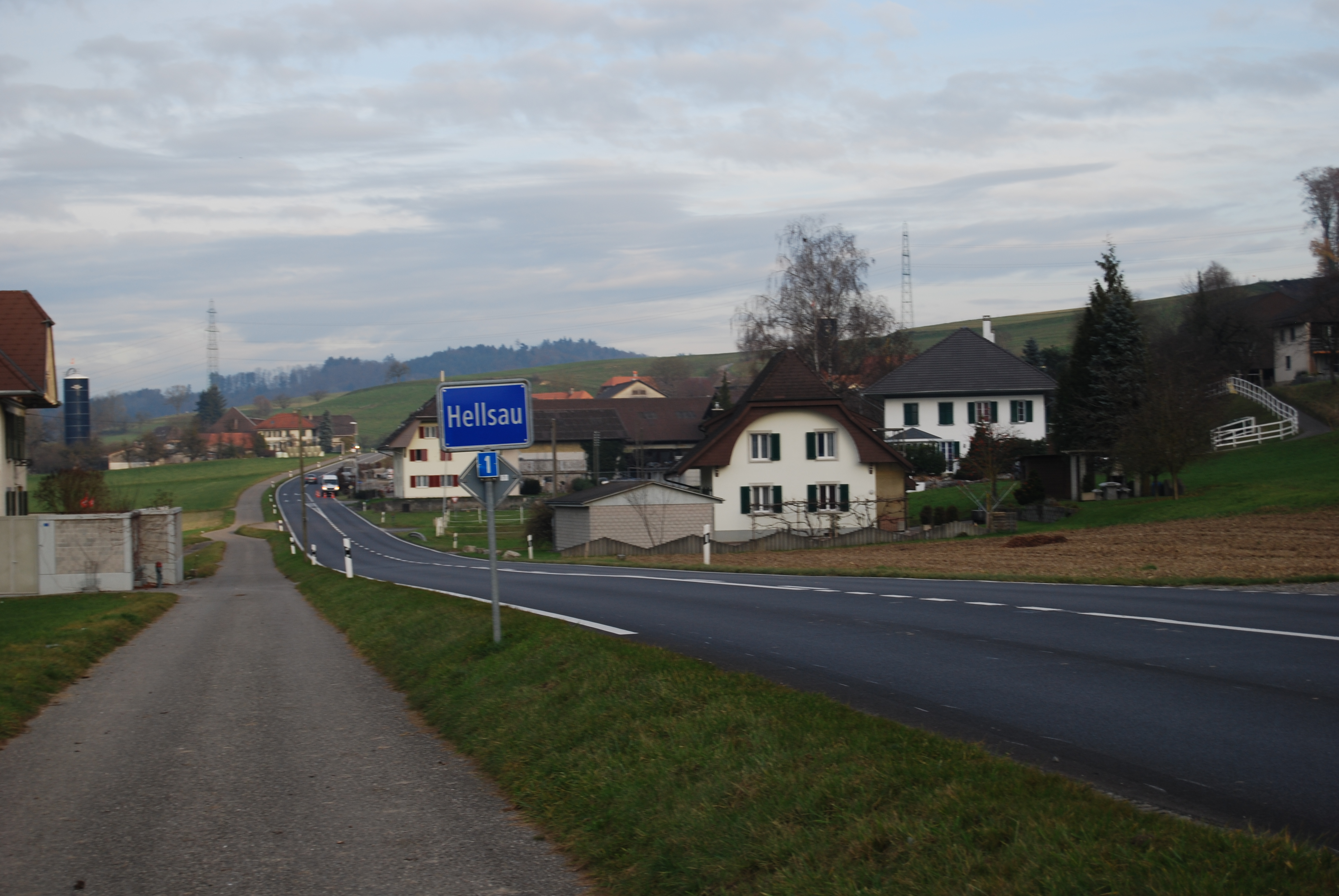
- Entrance into Hellsau village

- Flag Coat of arms
- Location of Hellsau
- Location within Switzerland Location within Canton of Bern
- Coordinates: 47°9′N 7°39′E
- Country: Switzerland
- Canton: Bern
- District: Emmental

Area
  - Total: 1.5 km^{2} (0.58 sq mi)
- Elevation: 478 m (1,568 ft)

Population (December 2020)
  - Total: 214
  - Density: 140/km^{2} (370/sq mi)
- Time zone: UTC+01:00 (CET)
  - Summer (DST): UTC+02:00 (CEST)
- Postal code: 3429
- SFOS number: 408
- ISO 3166 code: CH-BE
- Surrounded by: Alchenstorf, Heinrichswil-Winistorf (SO), Höchstetten, Seeberg
- Website: www.hellsau.ch

Hellsau is a municipality in the district of Burgdorf, in the canton of Bern, Switzerland.

== History ==
Hellsau is first mentioned in 1275 as Hellesowe.

The earliest trace of a settlement at Hellsau is an early medieval cemetery near the Äbi farm house. It is likely that the old village church once stood near the cemetery. The church was first mentioned in 1275 as a filial church of Burgdorf. It became a full church in 1353 under the patronage of St. Mary. It became part of the parish of Koppigen in 1422 and was given a chaplain in 1471. Following the Protestant Reformation the church was abandoned and eventually demolished.

For most of Hellsau's history, it was a village under the jurisdiction and town council of Koppigen. In 1571, Koppigen passed a law mandating fences in the Büeltscherzelg field because the farmers of Hellsau had been sneaking into the field to graze their animals. Agriculture is still important in the village economy, though a construction company provides a number of jobs. Between 1894 and 1911 it was the home of a private asylum and hospital. Marshes and meadows were drained in 1943-48. Starting in the 1820s Höchstetten and Hellsau formed a school district. The Moos school house was built in 1976.

== Geography ==
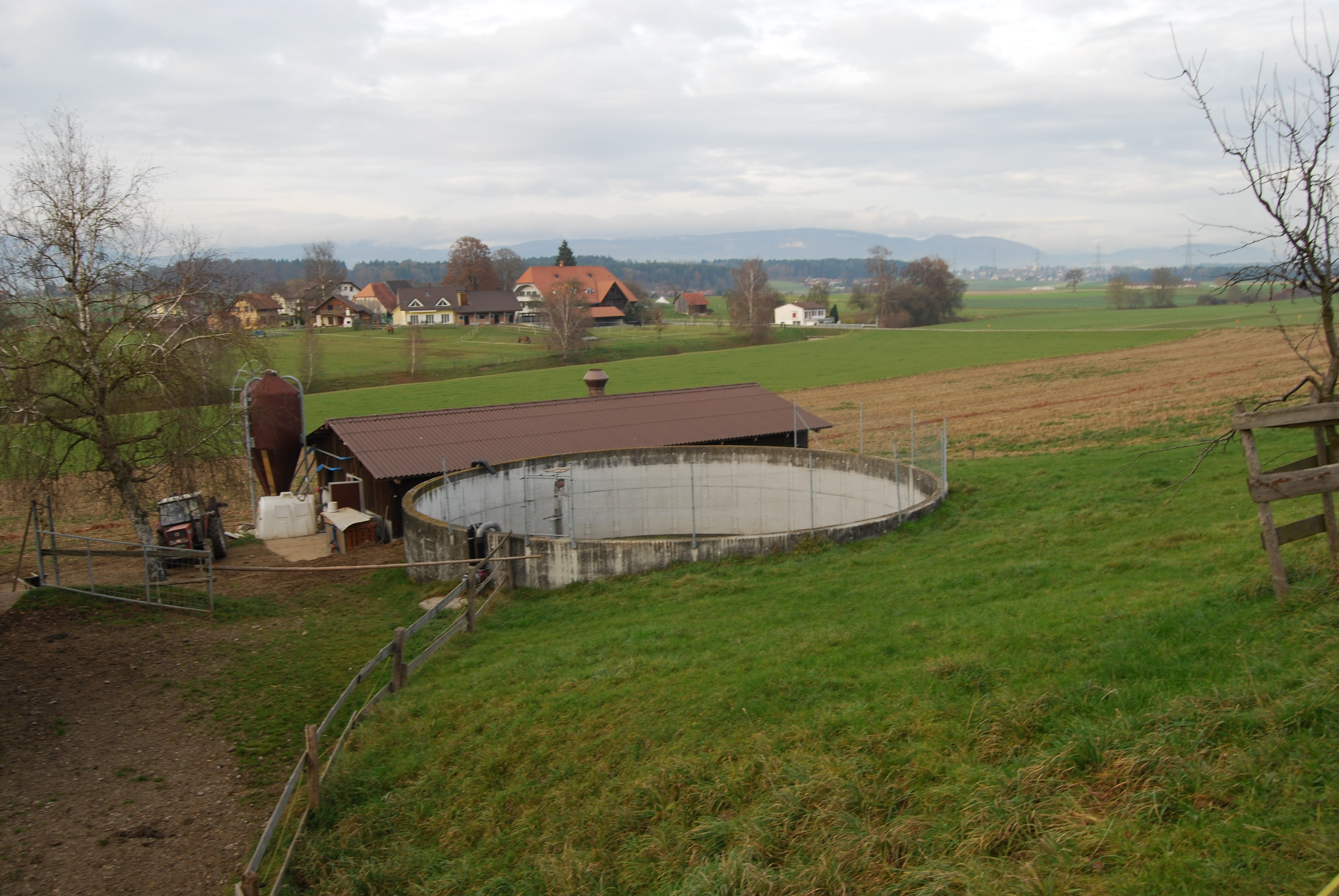
Fields around Hellsau

Hellsau has an area of 1.48 km^{2} (0.57 sq mi). Of this area, 1.06 km^{2} (0.41 mi^{2}) or 71.6% is used for agricultural purposes, while 0.35 km^{2} (0.14 mi^{2}) or 23.6% is forested. Of the rest of the land, 0.1 km^{2} (25 acres) or 6.8% is settled (buildings or roads).

Of the built up area, industrial buildings made up 1.4% of the total area while housing and buildings made up 2.7% and transportation infrastructure made up 2.7%. Out of the forested land, all of the forested land area is covered with heavy forests. Of the agricultural land, 48.0% is used for growing crops and 21.6% is pastures, while 2.0% is used for orchards or vine crops.

The village of Hellsau includes the village with Halde and the hamlets of Freienhof and Moos. Hellsau belongs to the parish of Koppigen.

On 31 December 2009 Amtsbezirk Burgdorf, the municipality's former district, was dissolved. On the following day, 1 January 2010, it joined the newly created Verwaltungskreis Emmental.

== Coat of arms ==
The blazon of the municipal coat of arms is Vert a Bend wavy Or and in a Chief Argent three Pales Gules. The lower part of the coat of arms is an example of canting arms. It represents a light meadow or German: helle Au.

== Demographics ==
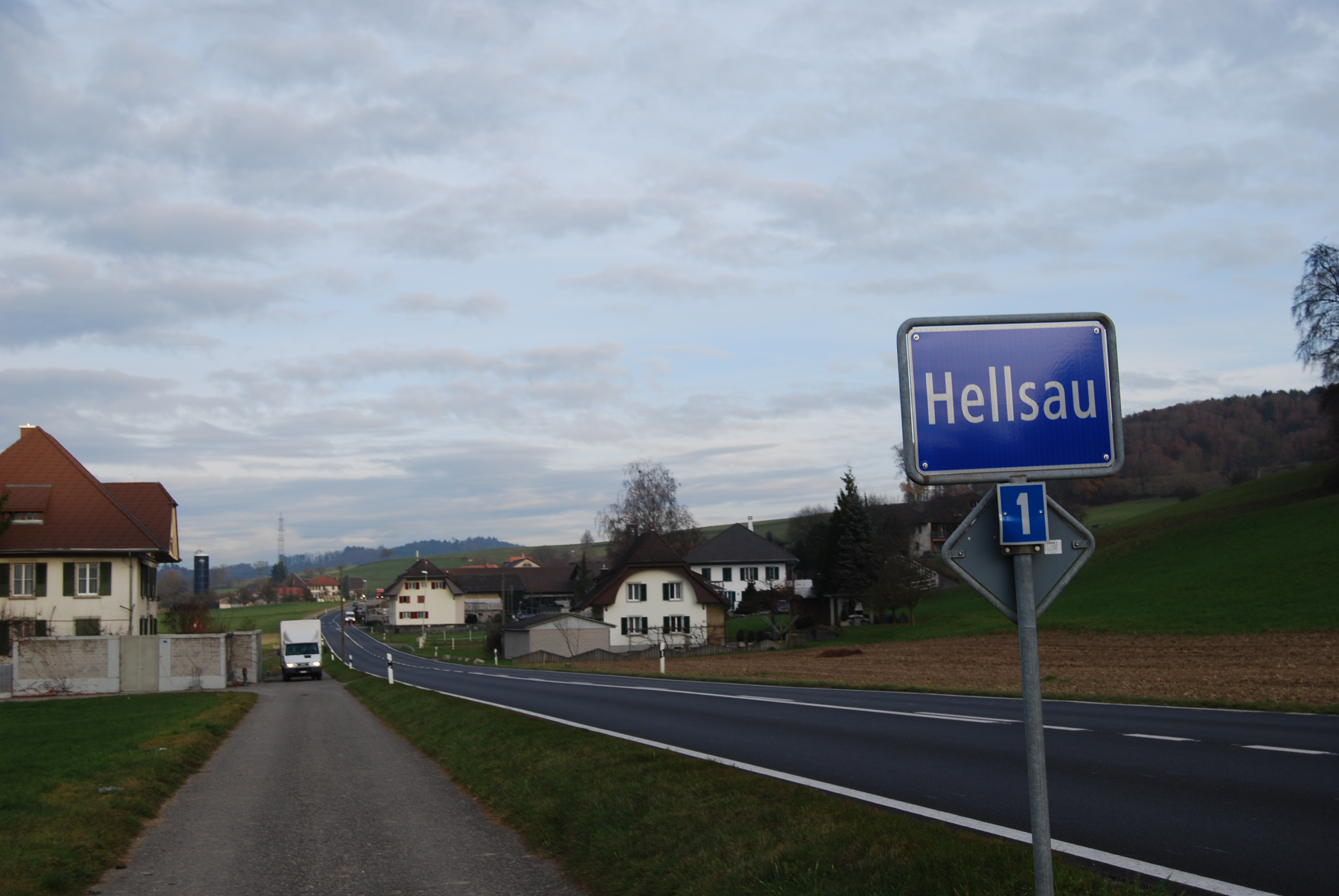
Hellsau

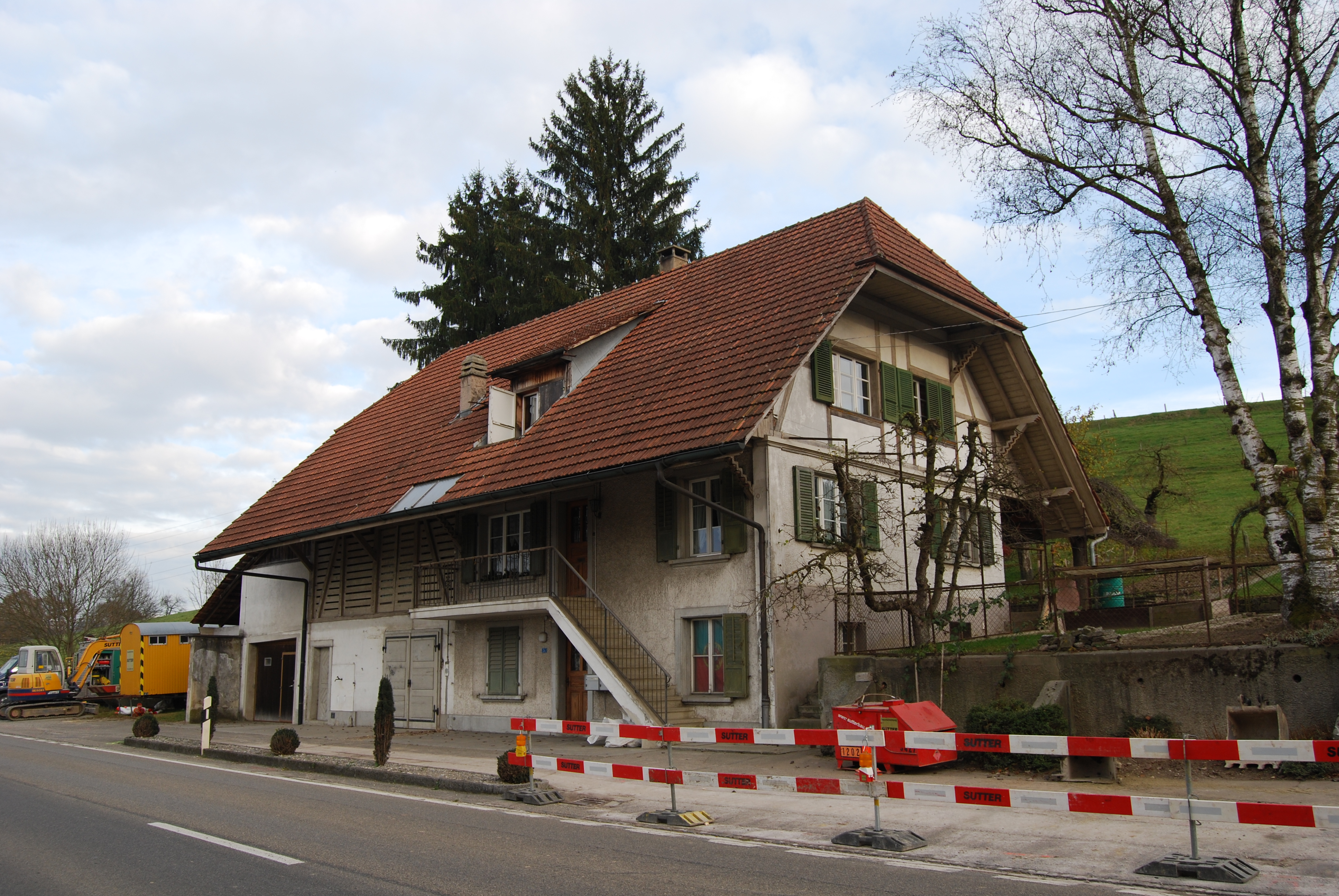
Partial half-timbered farm house in Hellsau

Hellsau has a population (as of December 2020) of 214. As of 2010, 2.6% of the population are resident foreign nationals. Over the last 10 years (2000-2010) the population has changed at a rate of -5%. Migration accounted for 0.5%, while births and deaths accounted for 1%.

Most of the population (as of 2000) speaks German (189 or 97.9%) as their first language, with one person each speaking French or Dutch.

As of 2008, the population was 51.3% male and 48.7% female. The population was made up of 95 Swiss men (49.2% of the population) and 4 (2.1%) non-Swiss men. There were 93 Swiss women (48.2%) and 1 (0.5%) non-Swiss women. Of the population in the municipality, 55 or about 28.5% were born in Hellsau and lived there in 2000. There were 93 or 48.2% who were born in the same canton, while 37 or 19.2% were born somewhere else in Switzerland, and 7 or 3.6% were born outside of Switzerland.

As of 2010, children and teenagers (0–19 years old) make up 25.4% of the population, while adults (20–64 years old) make up 61.1% and seniors (over 64 years old) make up 13.5%.

As of 2000, there were 85 people who were single and never married in the municipality. There were 92 married individuals, 10 widows or widowers and 6 individuals who are divorced.

As of 2000, there were 12 households that consist of only one person and 8 households with five or more people. In 2000, a total of 66 apartments (95.7% of the total) were permanently occupied, while 1 apartment was seasonally occupied and 2 apartments (2.9%) were empty. As of 2010, the construction rate of new housing units was 5.2 new units per 1000 residents. The vacancy rate for the municipality, in 2011, was 1.3%.

The historical population is given in the following chart:

== Economy ==
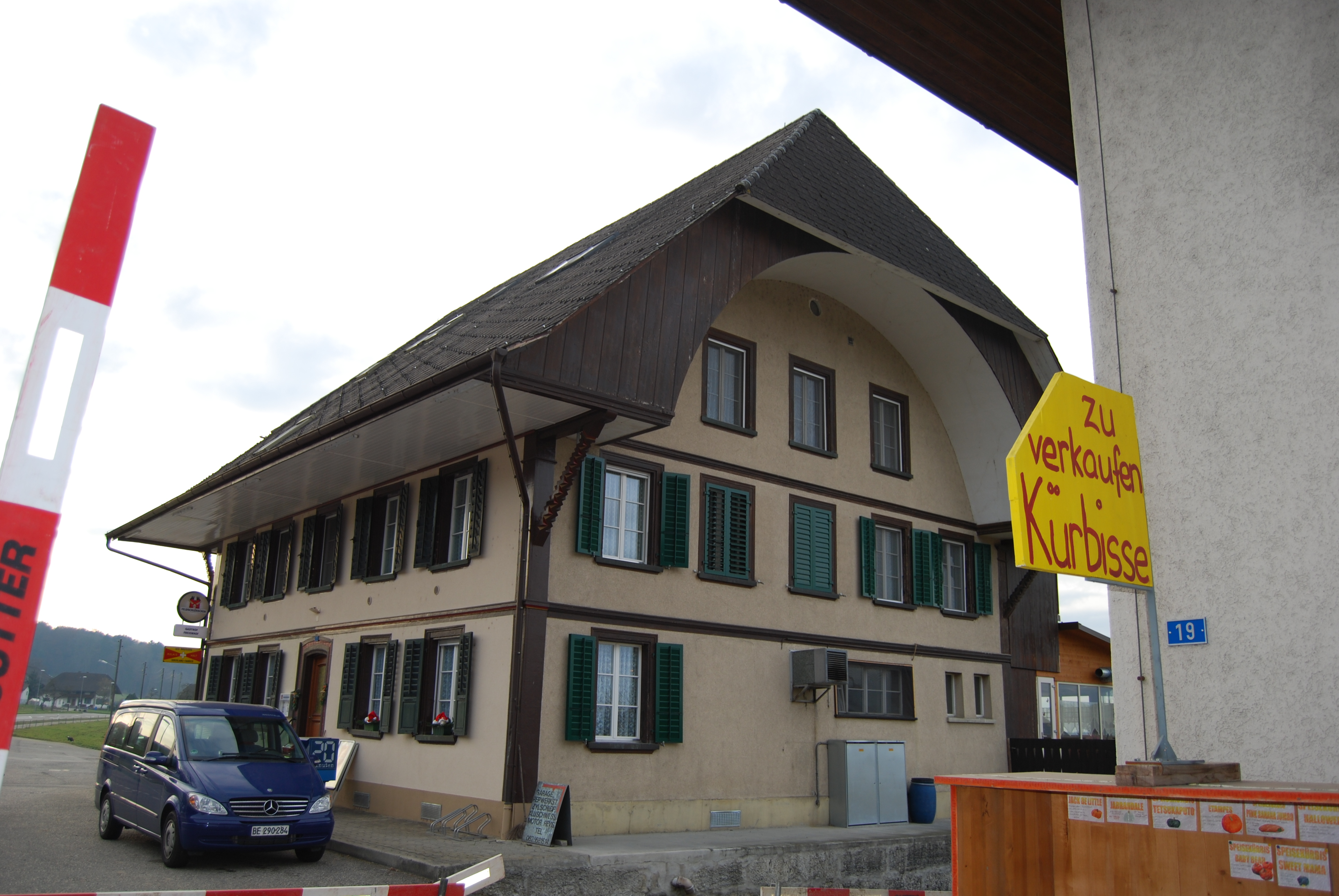
Small restaurant and hotel in Hellsau

As of 2011, Hellsau had an unemployment rate of 0.08%. As of 2008, there were a total of 128 people employed in the municipality. Of these, there were 23 people employed in the primary economic sector and about 6 businesses involved in this sector. 83 people were employed in the secondary sector and there were 5 businesses in this sector. 22 people were employed in the tertiary sector, with 5 businesses in this sector.

In 2008 there were a total of 112 full-time equivalent jobs. The number of jobs in the primary sector was 16, all of which were in agriculture. The number of jobs in the secondary sector was 79 of which 3 or (3.8%) were in manufacturing and 77 (97.5%) were in construction. The number of jobs in the tertiary sector was 17. In the tertiary sector; 4 or 23.5% were in wholesale or retail sales or the repair of motor vehicles, 4 or 23.5% were in a hotel or restaurant, 5 or 29.4% were technical professionals or scientists, 4 or 23.5% were in education.

In 2000, there were 84 workers who commuted into the municipality and 63 workers who commuted away. The municipality is a net importer of workers, with about 1.3 workers entering the municipality for every one leaving. Of the working population, 10.3% used public transportation to get to work, and 55.7% used a private car.

== Religion ==
From the 2000 census, 10 or 5.2% were Roman Catholic, while 156 or 80.8% belonged to the Swiss Reformed Church. Of the rest of the population, there were 18 individuals (or about 9.33% of the population) who belonged to another Christian church. There were 2 (or about 1.04% of the population) who were Islamic. 16 (or about 8.29% of the population) belonged to no church, are agnostic or atheist.

== Education ==
In Hellsau about 81 or (42.0%) of the population have completed non-mandatory upper secondary education, and 24 or (12.4%) have completed additional higher education (either university or a Fachhochschule). Of the 24 who completed tertiary schooling, 75.0% were Swiss men, 20.8% were Swiss women.

The Canton of Bern school system provides one year of non-obligatory Kindergarten, followed by six years of Primary school. This is followed by three years of obligatory lower Secondary school where the students are separated according to ability and aptitude. Following the lower Secondary students may attend additional schooling or they may enter an apprenticeship.

During the 2009-10 school year, there were a total of 31 students attending classes in Hellsau. There were no kindergarten classes in the municipality. The municipality had 2 primary classes and 31 students.

As of 2000, there were 15 students in Hellsau who came from another municipality, while 11 residents attended schools outside the municipality.
