= Alchenstorf =

- Municipality
- Flag Coat of arms
- Location of Alchenstorf
- Location within Switzerland Location within Canton of Bern
- Coordinates: 47°7′N 7°39′E
- Country: Switzerland
- Canton: Bern
- District: Emmental

Government
  - Executive: Gemeinderat with 5 members
  - Mayor: Gemeindepräsident(in); Kristin Fuchs (as of 2026)

Area
  - Total: 6.6 km^{2} (2.5 sq mi)
- Elevation: 500 m (1,600 ft)

Population (December 2020)
  - Total: 584
  - Density: 88/km^{2} (230/sq mi)
- Time zone: UTC+01:00 (CET)
  - Summer (DST): UTC+02:00 (CEST)
- Postal code: 3473
- SFOS number: 402
- ISO 3166 code: CH-BE
- Surrounded by: Hellsau, Höchstetten, Koppigen, Niederösch, Rumendingen, Seeberg, Wynigen
- Website: www.alchenstorf.ch

Alchenstorf is a municipality in the Emmental administrative district in the canton of Bern in Switzerland.

== History ==
Alchenstorf is first mentioned in 1221 as Alchirstorf.

Traces of Neolithic settlements have been found at Rain and Kastenmoos in the municipal borders. A Roman manor and coin depot were discovered in Ischbergwald. The first village church was in operation between 1275 and 1471. While the exact location of the church is no longer known, it was probably in the Unterdorf or lower village. After the church was demolished, Alchenstorf became part of the parish of Koppigen.

Even today the village remains rural and agricultural. In 1990, 64% of the workers commuted to nearby towns and cities for work.

== Geography ==
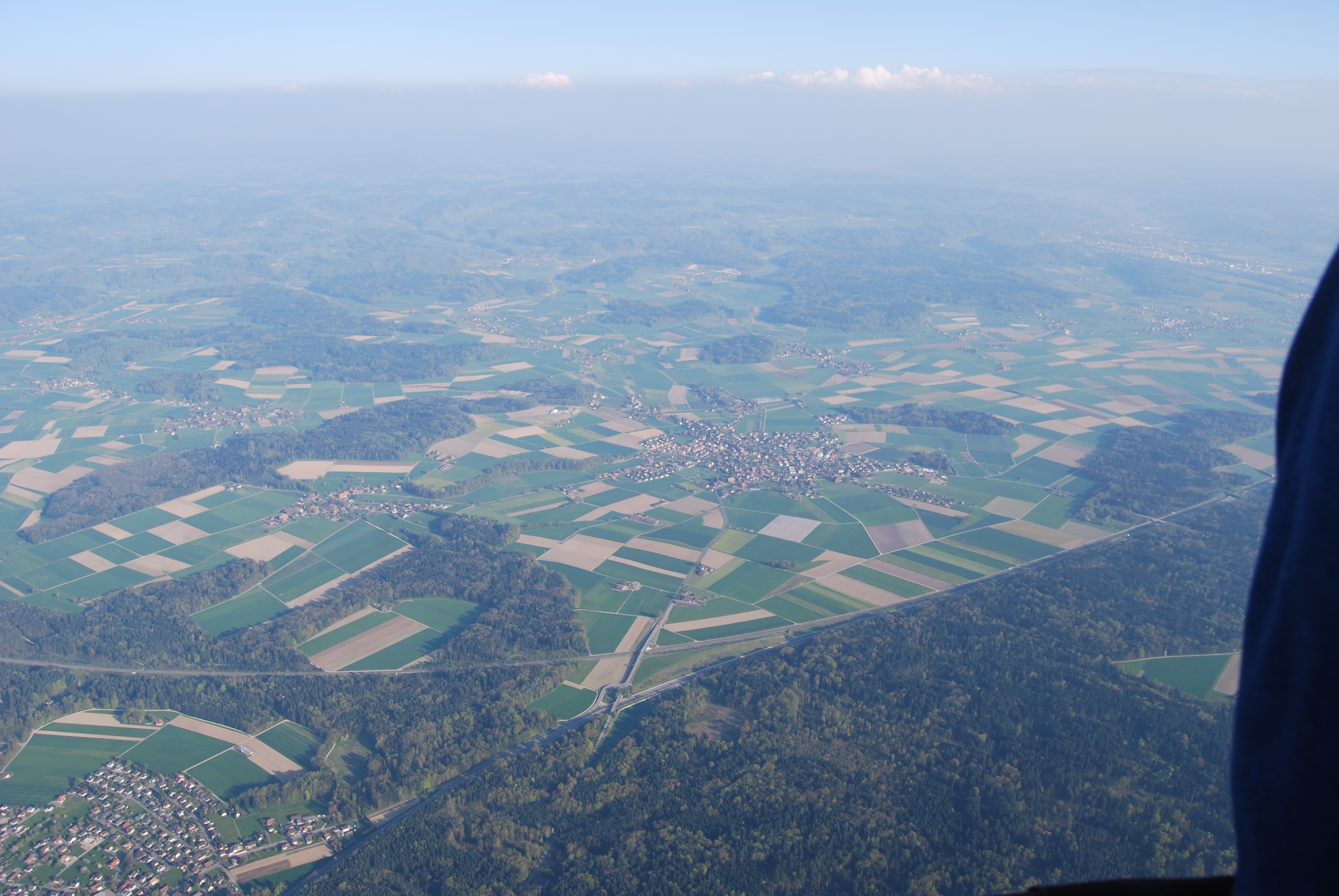
Aerial view of the area with Alchenstorf in the center background

Aerial view (1954)

Alchenstorf has an area of 6.57 km^{2} (2.54 sq mi). Of this area, 3.99 km^{2} (1.54 mi^{2}) or 60.8% is used for agricultural purposes, while 2.1 km^{2} (0.81 mi^{2}) or 32.0% is forested. Of the rest of the land, 0.51 km^{2} (0.20 mi^{2}) or 7.8% is settled (buildings or roads), 0.02 km^{2} (4.9 acres) or 0.3% is either rivers or lakes.

Of the built up area, housing and buildings made up 4.9% and transportation infrastructure made up 2.4%. Out of the forested land, all of the forested land area is covered with heavy forests. Of the agricultural land, 45.1% is used for growing crops and 14.0% is pastures, while 1.7% is used for orchards or vine crops. All the water in the municipality is flowing water.

It consists of the village of Alchenstorf (made up of Oberdorf and Unterdorf) and scattered hamlets and farm houses.

On 31 December 2009 Amtsbezirk Burgdorf, the municipality's former district, was dissolved. On the following day, 1 January 2010, it joined the newly created Verwaltungskreis Emmental.

== Coat of arms ==
The blazon of the municipal coat of arms is Argent a Ploughshare Azure on a Mount of 3 Coupeaux Gules.

== Demographics ==
Alchenstorf has a population (as of December 2020) of 584. As of 2010, 3.7% of the population are resident foreign nationals. Over the last 10 years (2000-2010) the population has changed at a rate of -0.3%. Migration accounted for -4.4%, while births and deaths accounted for 1%.

Most of the population (as of 2000) speaks German (543 or 98.5%) as their first language, French is the second most common (2 or 0.4%) and Serbo-Croatian is the third (2 or 0.4%). There is 1 person who speaks Italian.

As of 2008, the population was 49.4% male and 50.6% female. The population was made up of 269 Swiss men (47.3% of the population) and 12 (2.1%) non-Swiss men. There were 279 Swiss women (49.0%) and 9 (1.6%) non-Swiss women. Of the population in the municipality, 245 or about 44.5% were born in Alchenstorf and lived there in 2000. There were 216 or 39.2% who were born in the same canton, while 64 or 11.6% were born somewhere else in Switzerland, and 16 or 2.9% were born outside of Switzerland.

As of 2010, children and teenagers (0–19 years old) make up 21.6% of the population, while adults (20–64 years old) make up 60.3% and seniors (over 64 years old) make up 18.1%.

As of 2000, there were 242 people who were single and never married in the municipality. There were 263 married individuals, 26 widows or widowers and 20 individuals who are divorced.

As of 2000, there were 60 households that consist of only one person and 20 households with five or more people. In 2000, a total of 192 apartments (87.7% of the total) were permanently occupied, while 15 apartments (6.8%) were seasonally occupied and 12 apartments (5.5%) were empty. As of 2010, the construction rate of new housing units was 7 new units per 1000 residents. The vacancy rate for the municipality, in 2011, was 0.79%.

The historical population is given in the following chart:

== Politics ==
In the 2011 federal election the most popular party was the SVP which received 47.2% of the vote. The next three most popular parties were the BDP Party (22.4%), the SPS (9.2%) and the Green Party (5.5%). In the federal election, a total of 247 votes were cast, and the voter turnout was 56.0%.

== Economy ==
As of 2011, Alchenstorf had an unemployment rate of 0.39%. As of 2008, there were a total of 142 people employed in the municipality. Of these, there were 78 people employed in the primary economic sector and about 24 businesses involved in this sector. 32 people were employed in the secondary sector and there were 6 businesses in this sector. 32 people were employed in the tertiary sector, with 8 businesses in this sector.

In 2008 there were a total of 102 full-time equivalent jobs. The number of jobs in the primary sector was 52, all of which were in agriculture. The number of jobs in the secondary sector was 27 of which 7 or (25.9%) were in manufacturing and 19 (70.4%) were in construction. The number of jobs in the tertiary sector was 23. In the tertiary sector; 5 or 21.7% were in wholesale or retail sales or the repair of motor vehicles, 6 or 26.1% were in a hotel or restaurant, 4 or 17.4% were technical professionals or scientists, 3 or 13.0% were in education.

In 2000, there were 45 workers who commuted into the municipality and 227 workers who commuted away. The municipality is a net exporter of workers, with about 5.0 workers leaving the municipality for every one entering. Of the working population, 7% used public transportation to get to work, and 58.9% used a private car.

== Religion ==
From the 2000 census, 21 or 3.8% were Roman Catholic, while 491 or 89.1% belonged to the Swiss Reformed Church. Of the rest of the population, there were 3 members of an Orthodox church (or about 0.54% of the population), and there were 26 individuals (or about 4.72% of the population) who belonged to another Christian church. 20 (or about 3.63% of the population) belonged to no church, are agnostic or atheist, and 3 individuals (or about 0.54% of the population) did not answer the question.

== Education ==
In Alchenstorf about 219 or (39.7%) of the population have completed non-mandatory upper secondary education, and 84 or (15.2%) have completed additional higher education (either university or a Fachhochschule). Of the 84 who completed tertiary schooling, 73.8% were Swiss men, 23.8% were Swiss women.

The Canton of Bern school system provides one year of non-obligatory Kindergarten, followed by six years of Primary school. This is followed by three years of obligatory lower Secondary school where the students are separated according to ability and aptitude. Following the lower Secondary students may attend additional schooling or they may enter an apprenticeship.

During the 2009-10 school year, there were a total of 372 students attending classes in the Koppigen/Alchenstorf/Hellsau school district. There were 3 kindergarten classes with a total of 57 students in the school district. Of the kindergarten students, 7.0% were permanent or temporary residents of Switzerland (not citizens) and 7.0% have a different mother language than the classroom language. The school district had 9 primary classes and 169 students. Of the primary students, 5.3% were permanent or temporary residents of Switzerland (not citizens) and 5.9% have a different mother language than the classroom language. During the same year, there were 8 lower secondary classes with a total of 146 students. There were 4.8% who were permanent or temporary residents of Switzerland (not citizens) and 8.9% have a different mother language than the classroom language.

As of 2000, there were 125 students in Alchenstorf who came from another municipality, while 38 residents attended schools outside the municipality.
