= Koppigen =

- Municipality
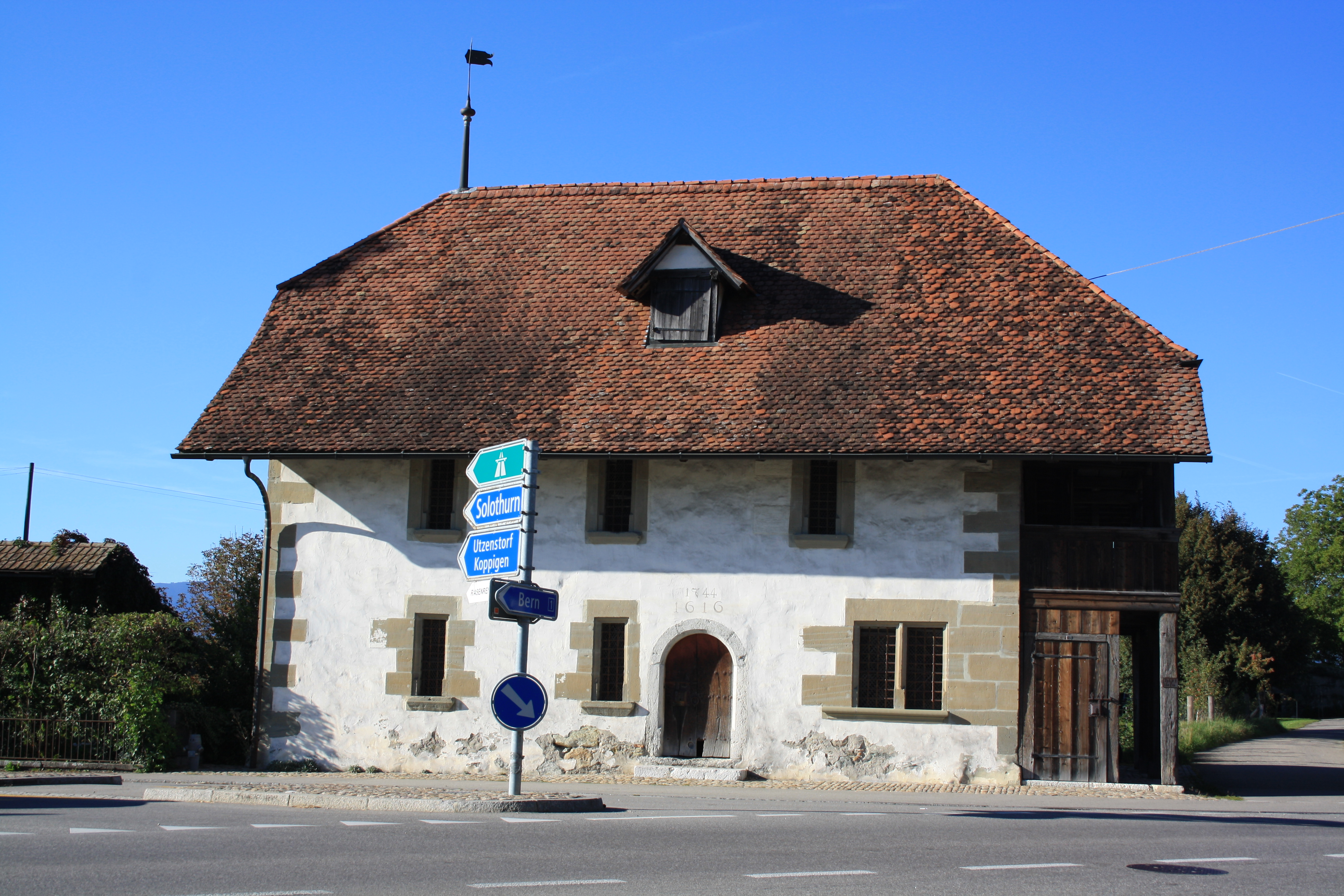
- Former Gasthof Bären in St Niklaus hamlet

- Flag Coat of arms
- Location of Koppigen
- Location within Switzerland Location within Canton of Bern
- Coordinates: 47°8′N 7°36′E
- Country: Switzerland
- Canton: Bern
- District: Emmental

Government
  - Executive: Gemeinderat with 7 members
  - Mayor: Gemeindepräsident(in); Christine Will SVP/UDC (as of 2026)

Area
  - Total: 6.98 km^{2} (2.69 sq mi)
- Elevation: 476 m (1,562 ft)

Population (December 2020)
  - Total: 2,104
  - Density: 301/km^{2} (781/sq mi)
- Time zone: UTC+01:00 (CET)
  - Summer (DST): UTC+02:00 (CEST)
- Postal code: 3425
- SFOS number: 413
- ISO 3166 code: CH-BE
- Surrounded by: Alchenstorf, Höchstetten, Niederösch, Obergerlafingen (SO), Recherswil (SO), Utzenstorf, Willadingen, Zielebach
- Website: https://www.koppigen.ch/

Koppigen is a municipality in the administrative district of Emmental in the canton of Bern in Switzerland.

== History ==
Aerial view from 400 m by Walter Mittelholzer (1922)

Koppigen is first mentioned in 1139 and again around 1181-82 as Chopingen. In 1887, the village of Brechershäusern separated from Koppigen to become part of Wynigen.

The municipal area was settled quite early in history. Neolithic items have been found at Öschberg and along the Ösch. Bronze Age items and a Hallstatt grave mound were found along the Utzenstorfstrasse. The village church and parsonage were built on the foundations of a Roman era farmhouse and other Roman sites have been found around the municipality. During the Middle Ages the village formed a ring divided by three roads around Koppigen Castle. The ministerialis (unfree knights in the service of a feudal overlord) family of Koppigen were pledged to the House of Zähringen. The Koppigen family were first mentioned in 1181, but died out in 1276. After their extinction, the castle and lands were held by several other Zähringen and Kyburg ministerialis families eventually landing, in the 14th century, in the hands of the Lords of Thornberg.

In 1386, Peter of Thornberg supported the Habsburgs against the city of Bern in the Sempach War. During the war, Bernese troops attacked Koppigen Castle and burned it to the ground. In 1397, Peter of Thornberg, the last of the line, died. He left all his possessions in Koppigen to the newly established Carthusian Charterhouse of Thornberg, which he had founded shortly before. The Carthusians made Koppigen the center of a parish that included Hellsau, Alchenstorf, Höchstetten and Willadingen. After the Protestant Reformation, in 1528, Bern secularized the Charterhouse and all of its possessions. Bern placed a vogt and a high court in Koppigen and it became part of the district of Burgdorf.

The nearby villages of Öschberg/Öschfurt and St. Niklaus were used as resting places along the east–west road. St. Niklaus was named after the chapel of St. Niklaus that was built there before 1448. In 1448, the Chapterhouse established a hostel in the village and required the hostel keeper to maintain the chapel as well. The Chapterhouse also established a hostel in Öschberg around the same time. In 1523, Koppigen took over the two villages and their hostels. After the Reformation, the hostels became taverns and inns. The hostel in St. Niklaus eventually became the Gasthof Bären became a boys' boarding school in 1924 and is now the children's home of Friedau. The hostel in Öschberg became the Gasthof Sonne which became a work house and model farm in 1906.

During the early 19th century, the local farmers switched from growing grain to raising dairy cattle and hay. The first dairy in the municipality opened in 1844, with a second in St. Niklaus in 1867. In the 1870s, industrialization started in the municipality with the opening of a cigar factory. However, only small businesses and factories remained in the village. At the end of the 21st century, there were small businesses in manufacturing, construction, automotive parts and producing décolletage.

Koppigen is the center of a regional school district. Until 1821, it had the only school for the entire parish. The secondary school opened in Koppigen in 1891. In 1920, the Affolter Foundation became the regional horticulture school and the Federal center for horticulture and special crops.

== Geography ==
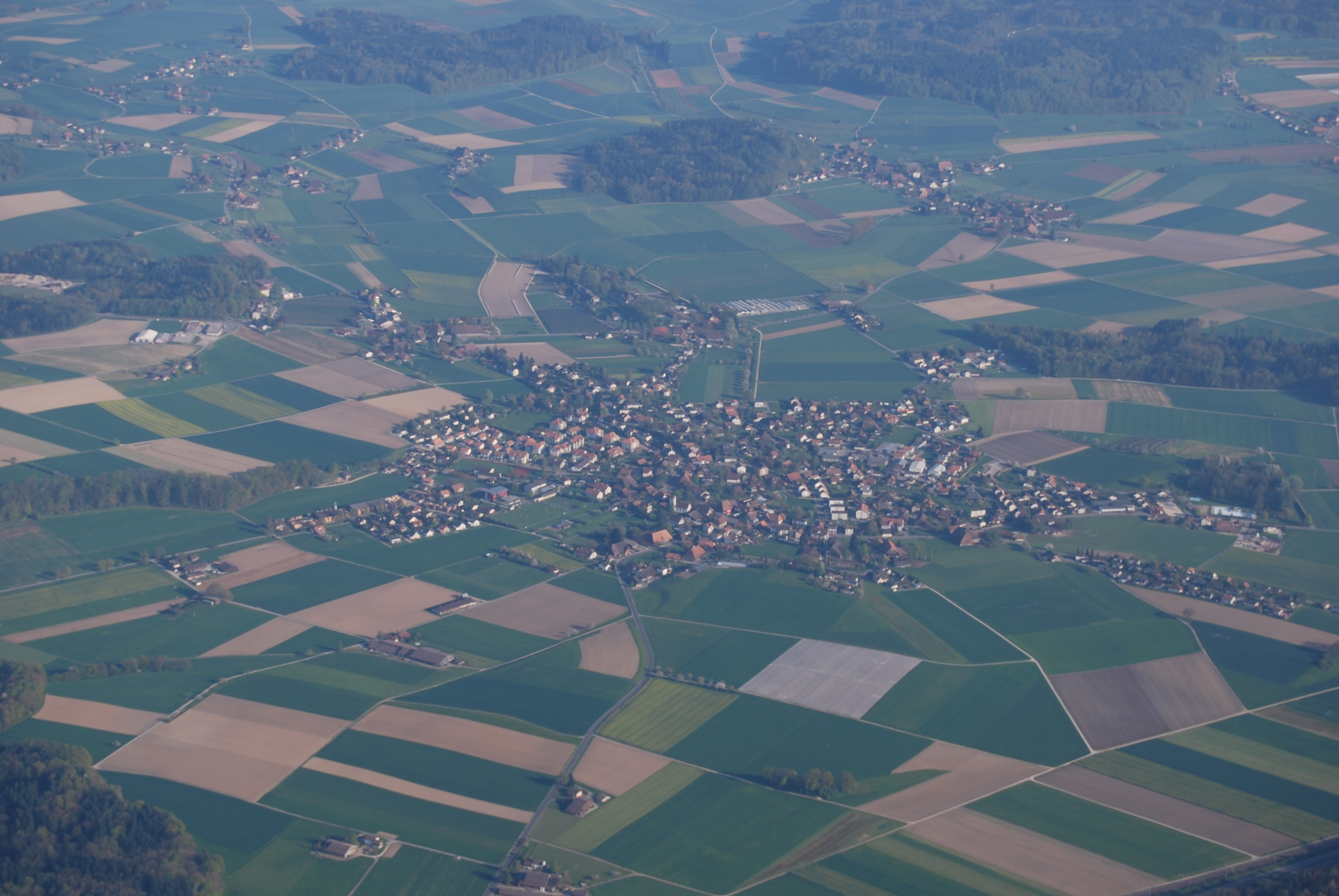
Koppigen

Koppigen has an area of 6.93 km^{2} (2.68 sq mi). Of this area, 4.08 km^{2} (1.58 mi^{2}) or 58.9% is used for agricultural purposes, while 1.6 km^{2} (0.62 mi^{2}) or 23.1% is forested. Of the rest of the land, 1.19 km^{2} (0.46 mi^{2}) or 17.2% is settled (buildings or roads), 0.04 km^{2} (9.9 acres) or 0.6% is either rivers or lakes and 0.01 km^{2} (2.5 acres) or 0.1% is unproductive land.

Of the built up area, industrial buildings made up 1.4% of the total area while housing and buildings made up 6.8% and transportation infrastructure made up 6.3%. while parks, green belts and sports fields made up 1.6%. Out of the forested land, all of the forested land area is covered with heavy forests. Of the agricultural land, 47.5% is used for growing crops and 9.2% is pastures, while 2.2% is used for orchards or vine crops. All the water in the municipality is flowing water.

Koppigen lies on the banks of the Ösch River and includes Koppigen as well as the settlements of St. Niklaus and Öschberg. It is the parish for Alchenstorf, Hellsau, Höchstetten and Willadingen.

On 31 December 2009, Amtsbezirk Burgdorf, the municipality's former district, was dissolved. On the following day, 1 January 2010, it joined the newly created Verwaltungskreis Emmental.

== Coat of arms ==
The blazon of the municipal coat of arms is Gules a Rooster Argent.

== Demographics ==
Koppigen has a population (as of December 2020) of 2,104. As of 2010, 7.1% of the population are resident foreign nationals. Over the last 10 years (2000-2010) the population has changed at a rate of 8.3%. Migration accounted for 8%, while births and deaths accounted for 0.5%.

Most of the population (as of 2000) speaks German (1,952 or 94.5%) as their first language, Albanian is the second most common (24 or 1.2%) and Serbo-Croatian is the third (16 or 0.8%). There are 14 people who speak French, 13 people who speak Italian and 1 person who speaks Romansh.

As of 2008, the population was 48.4% male and 51.6% female. The population was made up of 923 Swiss men (44.4% of the population) and 84 (4.0%) non-Swiss men. There were 1,009 Swiss women (48.5%) and 64 (3.1%) non-Swiss women. Of the population in the municipality, 671 or about 32.5% were born in Koppigen and lived there in 2000. There were 826 or 40.0% who were born in the same canton, while 297 or 14.4% were born somewhere else in Switzerland, and 162 or 7.8% were born outside of Switzerland.

As of 2010, children and teenagers (0–19 years old) make up 22.5% of the population, while adults (20–64 years old) make up 62.3% and seniors (over 64 years old) make up 15.1%.

As of 2000, there were 897 people who were single and never married in the municipality. There were 960 married individuals, 151 widows or widowers and 58 individuals who are divorced.

As of 2000, there were 206 households that consist of only one person and 60 households with five or more people. In 2000, a total of 737 apartments (92.9% of the total) were permanently occupied, while 39 apartments (4.9%) were seasonally occupied and 17 apartments (2.1%) were empty. As of 2010, the construction rate of new housing units was 1.9 new units per 1000 residents. The vacancy rate for the municipality, in 2011, was 0.95%.

The historical population is given in the following chart:

== Heritage sites of national significance ==
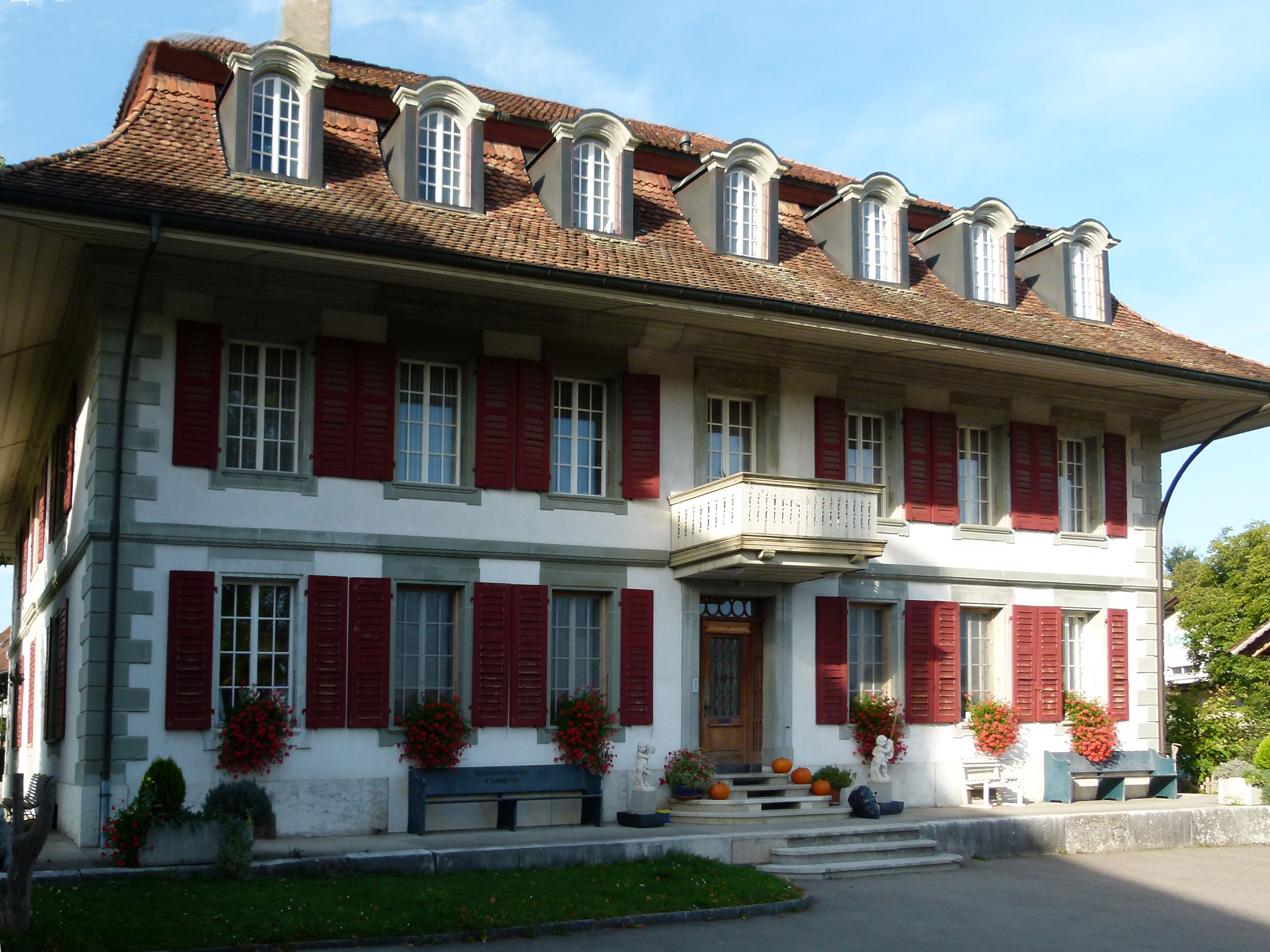
Former farm house at the Gasthof Bären

The former Gasthof Bären with its outbuildings in the hamlet of St. Niklaus is listed as a Swiss heritage site of national significance.

The Gasthof (inn and restaurant) building was built in 1824 in the late baroque and neoclassical style. The late baroque residential wing was built in the last quarter of the 18th century. In 1924 the buildings were used as a boys' home.

== Politics ==
In the 2011 federal election the most popular party was the Swiss People's Party (SVP) which received 31.9% of the vote. The next three most popular parties were the Conservative Democratic Party (BDP) (22.4%), the Social Democratic Party (SP) (16.9%) and the FDP.The Liberals (9%). In the federal election, a total of 779 votes were cast, and the voter turnout was 50.2%.

== Economy ==
As of 2011, Koppigen had an unemployment rate of 2.1%. As of 2008, there were a total of 773 people employed in the municipality. Of these, there were 67 people employed in the primary economic sector and about 22 businesses involved in this sector. 176 people were employed in the secondary sector and there were 25 businesses in this sector. 530 people were employed in the tertiary sector, with 62 businesses in this sector.

In 2008, there were a total of 598 full-time equivalent jobs. The number of jobs in the primary sector was 49, all of which were in agriculture. The number of jobs in the secondary sector was 153 of which 73 or (47.7%) were in manufacturing and 78 (51.0%) were in construction. The number of jobs in the tertiary sector was 396. In the tertiary sector; 78 or 19.7% were in wholesale or retail sales or the repair of motor vehicles, 9 or 2.3% were in the movement and storage of goods, 7 or 1.8% were in a hotel or restaurant, 10 or 2.5% were the insurance or financial industry, 33 or 8.3% were technical professionals or scientists, 36 or 9.1% were in education and 162 or 40.9% were in health care.

In 2000, there were 426 workers who commuted into the municipality and 644 workers who commuted away. The municipality is a net exporter of workers, with about 1.5 workers leaving the municipality for every one entering. Of the working population, 9.3% used public transportation to get to work, and 56.6% used a private car.

== Religion ==
From the 2000 census, 184 or 8.9% were Roman Catholic, while 1,654 or 80.1% belonged to the Swiss Reformed Church. Of the rest of the population, there were 6 members of an Orthodox church (or about 0.29% of the population), there was 1 individual who belongs to the Christian Catholic Church, and there were 70 individuals (or about 3.39% of the population) who belonged to another Christian church. There were 50 (or about 2.42% of the population) who were Islamic. There were 3 individuals who were Buddhist, 6 individuals who were Hindu and 3 individuals who belonged to another church. 70 (or about 3.39% of the population) belonged to no church, are agnostic or atheist, and 54 individuals (or about 2.61% of the population) did not answer the question.

== Education ==
In Koppigen about 772 or (37.4%) of the population have completed non-mandatory upper secondary education, and 221 or (10.7%) have completed additional higher education (either university or a Fachhochschule). Of the 221 who completed tertiary schooling, 74.7% were Swiss men, 19.9% were Swiss women, 3.2% were non-Swiss men and 2.3% were non-Swiss women.

The Canton of Bern school system provides one year of non-obligatory Kindergarten, followed by six years of Primary school. This is followed by three years of obligatory lower Secondary school where the students are separated according to ability and aptitude. Following the lower Secondary students may attend additional schooling or they may enter an apprenticeship.

During the 2010–11 school year, there were a total of 372 students attending classes in Koppigen. There were 3 kindergarten classes with a total of 57 students in the municipality. Of the kindergarten students, 7.0% were permanent or temporary residents of Switzerland (not citizens) and 7.0% have a different mother language than the classroom language. The municipality had 9 primary classes and 169 students. Of the primary students, 5.3% were permanent or temporary residents of Switzerland (not citizens) and 5.9% have a different mother language than the classroom language. During the same year, there were 8 lower secondary classes with a total of 146 students. There were 4.8% who were permanent or temporary residents of Switzerland (not citizens) and 8.9% have a different mother language than the classroom language.

As of 2000, there were 76 students in Koppigen who came from another municipality, while 67 residents attended schools outside the municipality.

Koppigen is home to the Schul- und Gemeindebibliothek Koppigen (municipal library of Koppigen). The library has (as of 2008) 6,777 books or other media, and loaned out 18,865 items in the same year. It was open a total of 160 days with average of 6 hours per week during that year.

== Climate ==
Climate data for Koppigen, elevation 485 m (1,591 ft), (1991–2020)
Month	Jan	Feb	Mar	Apr	May	Jun	Jul	Aug	Sep	Oct	Nov	Dec	Year
Mean daily maximum °C (°F)	3.1 (37.6)	5.2 (41.4)	10.5 (50.9)	14.9 (58.8)	18.9 (66.0)	22.9 (73.2)	25.1 (77.2)	24.6 (76.3)	19.7 (67.5)	14.1 (57.4)	7.5 (45.5)	3.5 (38.3)	14.2 (57.6)
Daily mean °C (°F)	0.4 (32.7)	1.1 (34.0)	5.2 (41.4)	8.9 (48.0)	13.2 (55.8)	16.8 (62.2)	18.7 (65.7)	18.4 (65.1)	14.0 (57.2)	9.5 (49.1)	4.3 (39.7)	1.0 (33.8)	9.3 (48.7)
Mean daily minimum °C (°F)	−2.7 (27.1)	−2.8 (27.0)	0.3 (32.5)	3.1 (37.6)	7.5 (45.5)	11.1 (52.0)	12.8 (55.0)	12.7 (54.9)	9.2 (48.6)	5.6 (42.1)	1.2 (34.2)	−1.8 (28.8)	4.7 (40.5)
Average precipitation mm (inches)	65.1 (2.56)	56.9 (2.24)	62.8 (2.47)	75.5 (2.97)	105.3 (4.15)	106.6 (4.20)	107.3 (4.22)	114.7 (4.52)	84.8 (3.34)	85.5 (3.37)	76.7 (3.02)	84.8 (3.34)	1,026 (40.39)
Average snowfall cm (inches)	11.4 (4.5)	11.6 (4.6)	5.1 (2.0)	1.8 (0.7)	0.0 (0.0)	0.0 (0.0)	0.0 (0.0)	0.0 (0.0)	0.0 (0.0)	0.6 (0.2)	5.0 (2.0)	13.5 (5.3)	49.0 (19.3)
Average precipitation days (≥ 1.0 mm)	10.1	9.3	9.5	9.5	11.9	11.4	10.8	11.2	9.1	10.3	10.6	11.4	125.1
Average snowy days (≥ 1.0 cm)	3.6	3.3	1.7	0.6	0.0	0.0	0.0	0.0	0.0	0.1	1.2	3.3	13.8
Average relative humidity (%)	86	81	75	73	74	73	71	74	79	85	88	88	79
Source 1: NOAA
Source 2: MeteoSwiss
