= Emmental (administrative district) =

Coordinates: 46°56′N 7°47′E

Emmental District Verwaltungskreis Emmental
- District
- Country: Switzerland
- Canton: Bern
- Capital: Langnau im Emmental

Area
  - Total: 690.45 km^{2} (266.58 sq mi)

Population (31 December 2020)
  - Total: 97,666
  - Density: 141.45/km^{2} (366.36/sq mi)
- Time zone: UTC+1 (CET)
  - Summer (DST): UTC+2 (CEST)
- Municipalities: 39

Emmental District in the Canton of Bern was created on 1 January 2010. It is part of the Emmental-Oberaargau administrative region. It contains 40 municipalities with an area of 690.45 km^{2} (266.58 sq mi) and a population (as of 31 December 2020) of 97,666.

Flag	Name	Population (31 December 2020)	Area in km^{2}
Aefligen	Aefligen	1,103	2.03
Affoltern im Emmental	Affoltern im Emmental	1,125	11.49
Alchenstorf	Alchenstorf	584	6.56
Bätterkinden	Bätterkinden	3,288	10.17
Burgdorf	Burgdorf	16,583	15.61
Dürrenroth	Dürrenroth	1,052	14.13
Eggiwil	Eggiwil	2,486	60.32
Ersigen	Ersigen	2,063	8.73
Hasle bei Burgdorf	Hasle bei Burgdorf	3,302	21.90
Heimiswil	Heimiswil	1,632	23.34
Hellsau	Hellsau	214	1.49
Hindelbank	Hindelbank	2,519	9.7
Höchstetten	Höchstetten	279	2.63
Kernenried	Kernenried	547	3.34
Kirchberg	Kirchberg	5,919	9.02
Koppigen	Koppigen	2,104	6.93
Krauchthal	Krauchthal	2,384	19.43
Langnau im Emmental	Langnau im Emmental	9,262	48.39
Lauperswil	Lauperswil	2,663	21.22
Lützelflüh	Lützelflüh	4,211	26.92
Lyssach	Lyssach	1,466	6.06
Oberburg	Oberburg	2,937	14.11
Röthenbach im Emmental	Röthenbach im Emmental	1,169	36.78
Rüderswil	Rüderswil	2,373	17.15
Rüdtligen-Alchenflüh	Rüdtligen-Alchenflüh	2,444	2.74
Rüegsau	Rüegsau	3,265	15.10
Rumendingen	Rumendingen	81	2.42
Rüti bei Lyssach	Rüti bei Lyssach	172	1.30
Schangnau	Schangnau	918	36.48
Signau	Signau	2,594	22.10
Sumiswald	Sumiswald	5,044	59.37
Trachselwald	Trachselwald	954	15.95
Trub	Trub	1,314	62.02
Trubschachen	Trubschachen	1,465	15.63
Utzenstorf	Utzenstorf	4,430	16.94
Wiler bei Utzenstorf	Wiler bei Utzenstorf	995	3.83
Willadingen	Willadingen	199	2.16
Wynigen	Wynigen	2,077	28.31
Zielebach	Zielebach	330	1.92
	Total (40)	97,666	690.45

== Mergers and name changes ==
- On 1 January 2016, the former municipalities of Oberösch and Niederösch merged into Ersigen.
- On 1 January 2021 the former municipality of Mötschwil merged into Hindelbank.
