= Landshut (disambiguation) =

Landshut is a city in Bavaria, Germany.

Landshut may also refer to:

- Battle of Landshut (1809), during the Napoleonic Wars
- Landshut (district), a district neighboring the aforementioned city
- Landshut (Lufthansa Flight 181), a plane hijacked by the Popular Front for the Liberation of Palestine in 1977
- Landshuter Hochzeit (Wedding of Landshut), a medieval pageant
- Landshut, Switzerland, a former municipality and district in the Canton of Bern, Switzerland. Now part of Utzenstorf
- Landshut Castle, Switzerland, a castle in Utzenstorf, Switzerland
- Landshut Castle, Germany, a ruin above the town of Bernkastel-Kues
- Lanžhot, a town in South Moravia, Czech Republic
- Landshut Bridge in Elgin, Scotland

== See also ==
- Landshuth (old spelling)
