= Landshut Castle =

Landshut Castle may refer to:

- Landshut Castle, Switzerland, a castle in Utzenstorf, Switzerland
- Landshut Castle, Germany, a ruin above the town of Bernkastel-Kues, Germany
