= Zielebach =

- Municipality
- Flag Coat of arms
- Location of Zielebach
- Location within Switzerland Location within Canton of Bern
- Coordinates: 47°10′N 7°35′E
- Country: Switzerland
- Canton: Bern
- District: Emmental

Government
  - Executive: Gemeinderat with 5 members
  - Mayor: Gemeindepräsident(in); Béatrice Kaufmann (as of 2026)

Area
  - Total: 1.9 km^{2} (0.73 sq mi)
- Elevation: 460 m (1,510 ft)

Population (December 2020)
  - Total: 330
  - Density: 170/km^{2} (450/sq mi)
- Time zone: UTC+01:00 (CET)
  - Summer (DST): UTC+02:00 (CEST)
- Postal code: 4564
- SFOS number: 556
- ISO 3166 code: CH-BE
- Surrounded by: Bätterkinden, Biberist (SO), Gerlafingen (SO), Koppigen, Obergerlafingen (SO), Utzenstorf, Wiler bei Utzenstorf
- Website: https://www.zielebach.ch/

Zielebach is a municipality in the administrative district of Emmental in the canton of Bern in Switzerland.

== History ==
Zielebach is first mentioned in 1320 as Zielebach.

During the Middle Ages, the village was owned by the Counts of Kyburg. At some time before 1331, Johann von Aarburg acquired rights to the land and the Zwing und Bann rights. However, a decade later, in 1341 he gave the village and all rights to St. Urban's Abbey. The city of Bern gained rights in the village, until in 1514, they incorporated the village into the Bernese bailiwick of Landshut. It remained part of the bailiwick, until the Act of Mediation in 1803 dissolved all the old bailiwicks and Zielebach became part of the new District of Fraubrunnen.

During the 19th century an iron works opened in the nearby village of Gerlafingen. In 1813, the Emme canal connected the municipalities and Zielebach began to support the factory at Gerlafingen.

== Geography ==
Zielebach has an area of 1.91 km^{2} (0.74 sq mi). Of this area, 0.77 km^{2} (0.30 mi^{2}) or 40.1% is used for agricultural purposes, while 0.93 km^{2} (0.36 mi^{2}) or 48.4% is forested. Of the rest of the land, 0.17 km^{2} (0.066 mi^{2}) or 8.9% is settled (buildings or roads), 0.02 km^{2} (4.9 acres) or 1.0% is either rivers or lakes and 0.02 km^{2} (4.9 acres) or 1.0% is unproductive land.

Of the built up area, industrial buildings made up 1.6% of the total area while housing and buildings made up 4.2% and transportation infrastructure made up 2.1%. Out of the forested land, all of the forested land area is covered with heavy forests. Of the agricultural land, 24.0% is used for growing crops and 14.6% is pastures, while 1.6% is used for orchards or vine crops. Of the water in the municipality, 0.5% is in lakes and 0.5% is in rivers and streams.

The municipality is located on the border with the Canton of Solothurn near the Emme river.

On 31 December 2009 Amtsbezirk Fraubrunnen, the municipality's former district, was dissolved. On the following day, 1 January 2010, it joined the newly created Verwaltungskreis Emmental.

== Coat of arms ==
The blazon of the municipal coat of arms is Vert triple Bar wavy Argent lined Sable.

== Demographics ==
Zielebach has a population (as of December 2020) of 330. As of 2010, 5.0% of the population are resident foreign nationals. Over the last 10 years (2000–2010) the population has changed at a rate of -4.5%. Migration accounted for -1.5%, while births and deaths accounted for -0.9%.

Most of the population (as of 2000) speaks German (325 or 98.2%) as their first language, Italian is the second most common (4 or 1.2%) and Polish is the third (1 or 0.3%).

As of 2008, the population was 48.1% male and 51.9% female. The population was made up of 148 Swiss men (46.0% of the population) and 7 (2.2%) non-Swiss men. There were 158 Swiss women (49.1%) and 9 (2.8%) non-Swiss women. Of the population in the municipality, 92 or about 27.8% were born in Zielebach and lived there in 2000. There were 109 or 32.9% who were born in the same canton, while 102 or 30.8% were born somewhere else in Switzerland, and 20 or 6.0% were born outside of Switzerland.

As of 2010, children and teenagers (0–19 years old) make up 14% of the population, while adults (20–64 years old) make up 66.5% and seniors (over 64 years old) make up 19.6%.

As of 2000, there were 124 people who were single and never married in the municipality. There were 169 married individuals, 19 widows or widowers and 19 individuals who are divorced.

As of 2000, there were 34 households that consist of only one person and 8 households with five or more people. In 2000, a total of 130 apartments (90.9% of the total) were permanently occupied, while 8 apartments (5.6%) were seasonally occupied and 5 apartments (3.5%) were empty.

The historical population is given in the following chart:

== Politics ==
In the 2011 federal election the most popular party was the Swiss People's Party (SVP) which received 47.9% of the vote. The next three most popular parties were the Social Democratic Party (SP) (17.1%), the Conservative Democratic Party (BDP) (13.5%) and the Green Liberal Party (GLP) (6.7%). In the federal election, a total of 107 votes were cast, and the voter turnout was 40.1%.

== Economy ==
As of 2011, Zielebach had an unemployment rate of 1.13%. As of 2008, there were a total of 26 people employed in the municipality. Of these, there were 17 people employed in the primary economic sector and about 5 businesses involved in this sector. 4 people were employed in the secondary sector and there were 2 businesses in this sector. 5 people were employed in the tertiary sector, with 3 businesses in this sector. There were 183 residents of the municipality who were employed in some capacity, of which females made up 43.2% of the workforce.

In 2008 there were a total of 15 full-time equivalent jobs. The number of jobs in the primary sector was 9, all in agriculture. The number of jobs in the secondary sector was 3, all in manufacturing. The number of jobs in the tertiary sector was 3, of which 2 were in a hotel or restaurant.

In 2000, there were 3 workers who commuted into the municipality and 152 workers who commuted away. The municipality is a net exporter of workers, with about 50.7 workers leaving the municipality for every one entering. Of the working population, 9.8% used public transportation to get to work, and 66.7% used a private car.

== Religion ==
From the 2000 census, 31 or 9.4% were Roman Catholic, while 245 or 74.0% belonged to the Swiss Reformed Church. Of the rest of the population, there was 1 member of an Orthodox church, and there were 24 individuals (or about 7.25% of the population) who belonged to another Christian church. There were 1 individual who belonged to another church. 35 (or about 10.57% of the population) belonged to no church, are agnostic or atheist, and 6 individuals (or about 1.81% of the population) did not answer the question.

== Education ==
In Zielebach about 152 or (45.9%) of the population have completed non-mandatory upper secondary education, and 29 or (8.8%) have completed additional higher education (either university or a Fachhochschule). Of the 29 who completed tertiary schooling, 48.3% were Swiss men, 34.5% were Swiss women.

During the 2010–11 school year, there were no students attending school in Zielebach.

As of 2000, there was one student in Zielebach who came from another municipality, while 20 residents attended schools outside the municipality.
