= Wiler bei Utzenstorf =

- Municipality
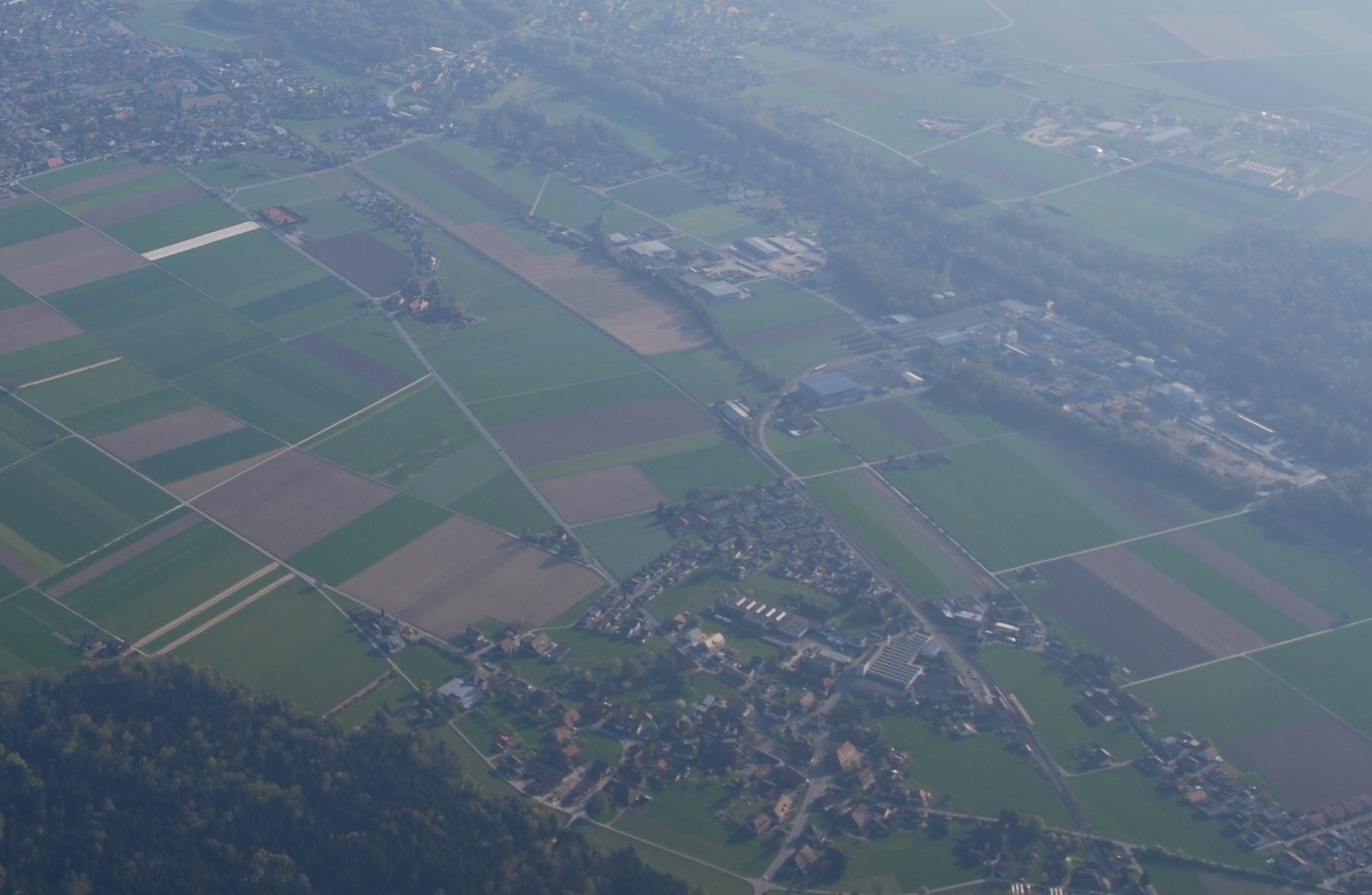

- Flag Coat of arms
- Location of Wiler bei Utzenstorf
- Location within Switzerland Location within Canton of Bern
- Coordinates: 47°9′N 7°33′E
- Country: Switzerland
- Canton: Bern
- District: Emmental

Government
  - Executive: Gemeinderat with 7 members
  - Mayor: Gemeindepräsident(in); Christoph Jutzi (as of 2026)

Area
  - Total: 3.8 km^{2} (1.5 sq mi)
- Elevation: 462 m (1,516 ft)

Population (December 2020)
  - Total: 995
  - Density: 260/km^{2} (680/sq mi)
- Time zone: UTC+01:00 (CET)
  - Summer (DST): UTC+02:00 (CEST)
- Postal code: 3428
- SFOS number: 554
- ISO 3166 code: CH-BE
- Surrounded by: Bätterkinden, Utzenstorf, Zielebach
- Website: www.wiler.ch

Wiler bei Utzenstorf is a municipality in the administrative district of Emmental in the canton of Bern in Switzerland.

== History ==
Aerial view 1949

Wiler bei Utzenstorf is first mentioned around 1261–63 as Wilere.

The village was first mentioned as a part of the Kyburg district of Utzenstorf. It was also part of the court and parish of Utzenstorf. In 1514, the entire district was acquired by the town of Bern. Under Bernese rule it became part of the bailiwick of Landshut in Utzenstorf. With the Act of Mediation in 1803, the old bailiwick was dissolved and Wiler became part of the new Fraubrunnen District.

In the 19th century many of the local farmers shifted from raising food crops to raising dairy cattle. A dairy farmers' cooperative was established in 1850 and in 1859 a local dairy was built. A new road from Burgdorf to Solothurn was built through the village in 1908. This was followed by a railroad station of the Solothurn-Burgdorf-Thun Railway in 1929. The improved roads and the railroad allowed factories to settle in Wiler. The village began to change from a rural, agricultural village into an industrial and commuter town.

The first village school, shared between Wiler and Zielebach, opened in 1728. In 2010, the schools of Wiler, Utzenstorf, Bätterkinden and Zielebach have joined into the Untere Emme school district.

== Geography ==
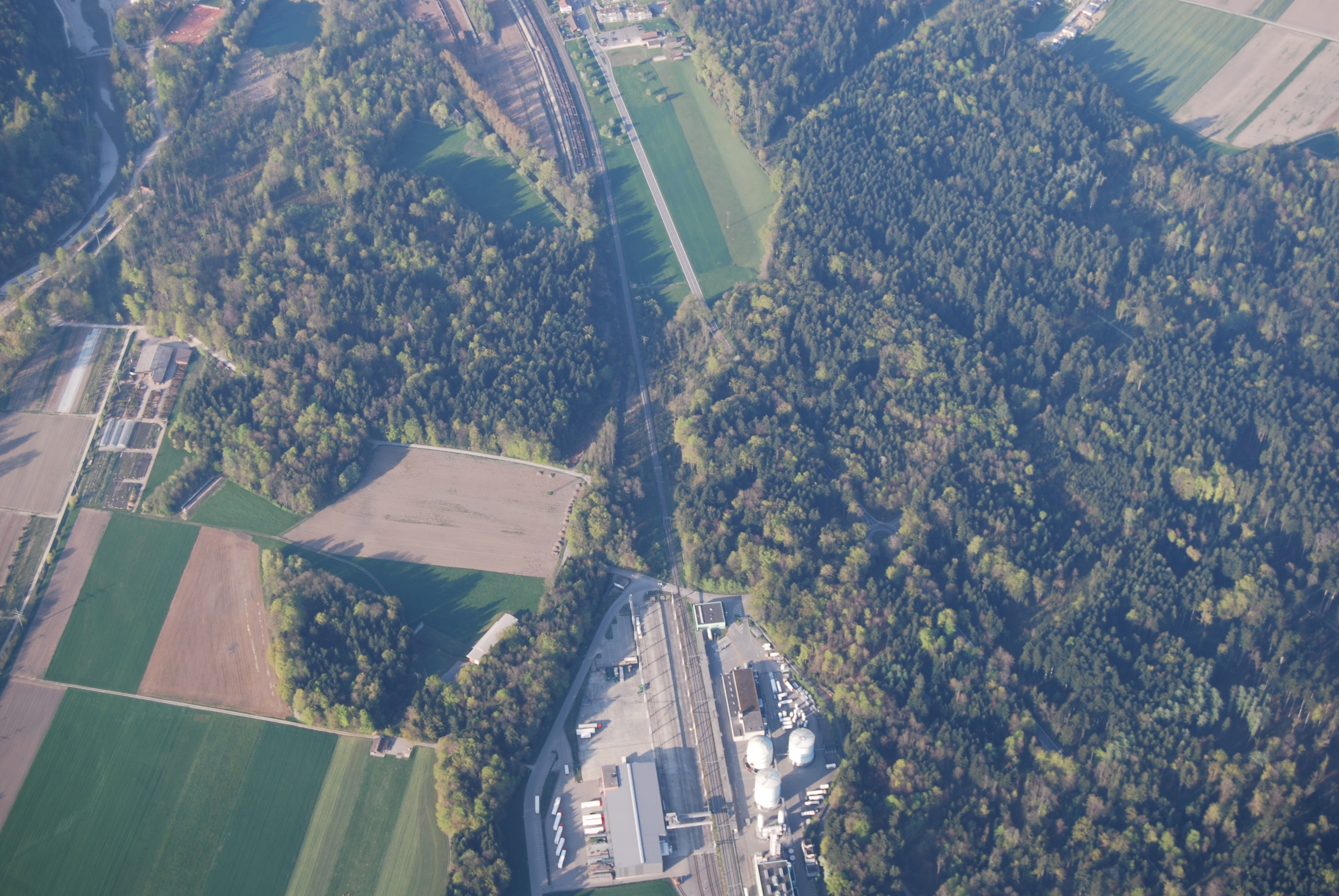
Aerial view of the industrial quarter Vorholzmatt in Wiler bei Utzenstorf

Wiler bei Utzenstorf has an area of 3.82 km^{2} (1.47 sq mi). Of this area, 2.02 km^{2} (0.78 mi^{2}) or 52.9% is used for agricultural purposes, while 1.16 km^{2} (0.45 mi^{2}) or 30.4% is forested. Of the rest of the land, 0.58 km^{2} (0.22 mi^{2}) or 15.2% is settled (buildings or roads), 0.04 km^{2} (9.9 acres) or 1.0% is either rivers or lakes.

Of the built up area, industrial buildings made up 2.9% of the total area while housing and buildings made up 6.3% and transportation infrastructure made up 5.8%. Out of the forested land, all of the forested land area is covered with heavy forests. Of the agricultural land, 40.6% is used for growing crops and 9.4% is pastures, while 2.9% is used for orchards or vine crops. All the water in the municipality is flowing water.

The municipality is located on the right bank of the Emme river. It consists of the village of Wiler bei Utzenstorf and the hamlet of Wilerfeld.

On 31 December 2009 Amtsbezirk Fraubrunnen, the municipality's former district, was dissolved. On the following day, 1 January 2010, it joined the newly created Verwaltungskreis Emmental.

== Coat of arms ==
The blazon of the municipal coat of arms is Per bend Argent and Vert two Leaves counterchanged.

== Demographics ==
Wiler bei Utzenstorf has a population (as of December 2020) of 995. As of 2010, 4.2% of the population are resident foreign nationals. Over the last 10 years (2000–2010) the population has changed at a rate of 4%. Migration accounted for 0.8%, while births and deaths accounted for 2.7%.

Most of the population (as of 2000) speaks German (754 or 96.5%) as their first language, Italian is the second most common (10 or 1.3%) and French is the third (8 or 1.0%).

As of 2008, the population was 53.6% male and 46.4% female. The population was made up of 413 Swiss men (50.9% of the population) and 22 (2.7%) non-Swiss men. There were 365 Swiss women (45.0%) and 12 (1.5%) non-Swiss women. Of the population in the municipality, 234 or about 30.0% were born in Wiler bei Utzenstorf and lived there in 2000. There were 342 or 43.8% who were born in the same canton, while 139 or 17.8% were born somewhere else in Switzerland, and 46 or 5.9% were born outside of Switzerland.

As of 2010, children and teenagers (0–19 years old) make up 19.1% of the population, while adults (20–64 years old) make up 60.8% and seniors (over 64 years old) make up 20.1%.

As of 2000, there were 300 people who were single and never married in the municipality. There were 406 married individuals, 38 widows or widowers and 37 individuals who are divorced.

As of 2000, there were 98 households that consist of only one person and 19 households with five or more people. In 2000, a total of 327 apartments (88.4% of the total) were permanently occupied, while 22 apartments (5.9%) were seasonally occupied and 21 apartments (5.7%) were empty. As of 2010, the construction rate of new housing units was 3.7 new units per 1000 residents.

The historical population is given in the following chart:

== Politics ==
In the 2011 federal election the most popular party was the Conservative Democratic Party (BDP) which received 29.4% of the vote. The next three most popular parties were the Swiss People's Party (SVP) (24.6%), the Social Democratic Party (SP) (19.4%) and the Green Liberal Party (GLP) (6.8%). In the federal election, a total of 302 votes were cast, and the voter turnout was 45.6%.

== Economy ==
As of 2011, Wiler bei Utzenstorf had an unemployment rate of 2.18%. As of 2008, there were a total of 413 people employed in the municipality. Of these, there were 31 people employed in the primary economic sector and about 13 businesses involved in this sector. 287 people were employed in the secondary sector and there were 14 businesses in this sector. 95 people were employed in the tertiary sector, with 15 businesses in this sector. There were 405 residents of the municipality who were employed in some capacity, of which females made up 44.7% of the workforce.

In 2008 there were a total of 358 full-time equivalent jobs. The number of jobs in the primary sector was 21, all of which were in agriculture. The number of jobs in the secondary sector was 258 of which 228 or (88.4%) were in manufacturing and 30 (11.6%) were in construction. The number of jobs in the tertiary sector was 79. In the tertiary sector; 7 or 8.9% were in wholesale or retail sales or the repair of motor vehicles, 45 or 57.0% were in the movement and storage of goods, 7 or 8.9% were in a hotel or restaurant, and 5 or 6.3% were technical professionals or scientists.

In 2000, there were 258 workers who commuted into the municipality and 288 workers who commuted away. The municipality is a net exporter of workers, with about 1.1 workers leaving the municipality for every one entering. Of the working population, 13.3% used public transportation to get to work, and 52.1% used a private car.

== Religion ==
From the 2000 census, 63 or 8.1% were Roman Catholic, while 626 or 80.2% belonged to the Swiss Reformed Church. Of the rest of the population, there was 1 member of an Orthodox church, and there were 30 individuals (or about 3.84% of the population) who belonged to another Christian church. There were 11 (or about 1.41% of the population) who were Islamic. There were 4 individuals who were Buddhist. 40 (or about 5.12% of the population) belonged to no church, are agnostic or atheist, and 21 individuals (or about 2.69% of the population) did not answer the question.

== Education ==
In Wiler bei Utzenstorf about 314 or (40.2%) of the population have completed non-mandatory upper secondary education, and 81 or (10.4%) have completed additional higher education (either university or a Fachhochschule). Of the 81 who completed tertiary schooling, 74.1% were Swiss men, 23.5% were Swiss women.

The Canton of Bern school system provides one year of non-obligatory Kindergarten, followed by six years of Primary school. This is followed by three years of obligatory lower Secondary school where the students are separated according to ability and aptitude. Following the lower Secondary students may attend additional schooling or they may enter an apprenticeship.

During the 2010–11 school year, there were a total of 70 students attending classes in Wiler bei Utzenstorf. There was one kindergarten class with a total of 16 students in the municipality. The municipality had 3 primary classes and 54 students. Of the primary students, 7.4% were permanent or temporary residents of Switzerland (not citizens).

As of 2000, there were 3 students in Wiler bei Utzenstorf who came from another municipality, while 54 residents attended schools outside the municipality.
