= Benedictus Aretius =

Swiss Protestant theologian (1505–1574)

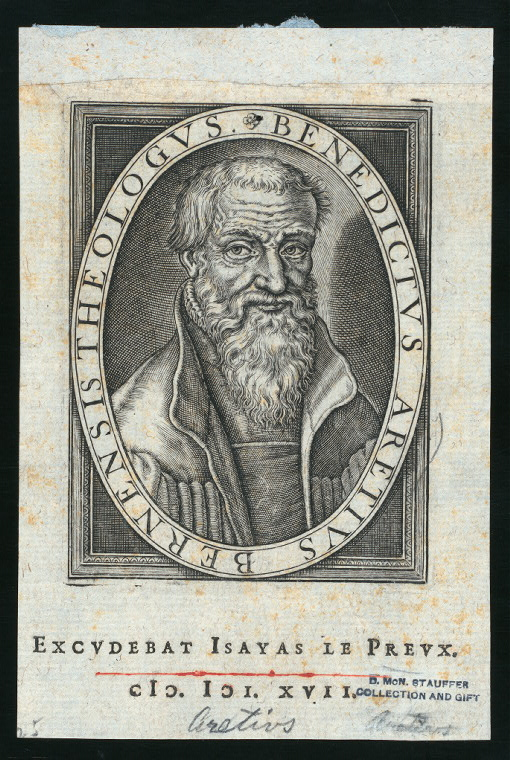

Benedictus Aretius (surname derived from Marti by Greek translation) (1505–1574) was a Swiss Protestant theologian, Protestant reformer and natural philosopher.

== Life ==
He was born at Bätterkinden, in the canton of Bern, Switzerland. He studied at Strasbourg and at Marburg, where he became professor of logic. He was called to Bern as a school-teacher, 1548, and became professor of theology, 1564.

He died at Bern on 22 March 1574.

== Works ==
His major work, Theologiæ problemata (Bern, 1573), was a compendium of the knowledge of the time and was highly valued. His Examen theologicum (1557) ran through six editions in fourteen years. His works also include

- a commentary on the New Testament (1580 and 1616) and on the Pentateuch (1602; 2d ed., with commentary on the Psalms added, 1618);
- a commentary on Pindar (1587);
- a description of the flora of two mountains of the Bernese Oberland, Stockhorn and Niesen (Strasbourg, 1561);
- a Hebrew method for schools (Basel, 1561); and
- a defence of the execution (in 1566) of the antitrinitarian Valentin Gentilis (Geneva, 1567).
