= Bätterkinden =

- Municipality
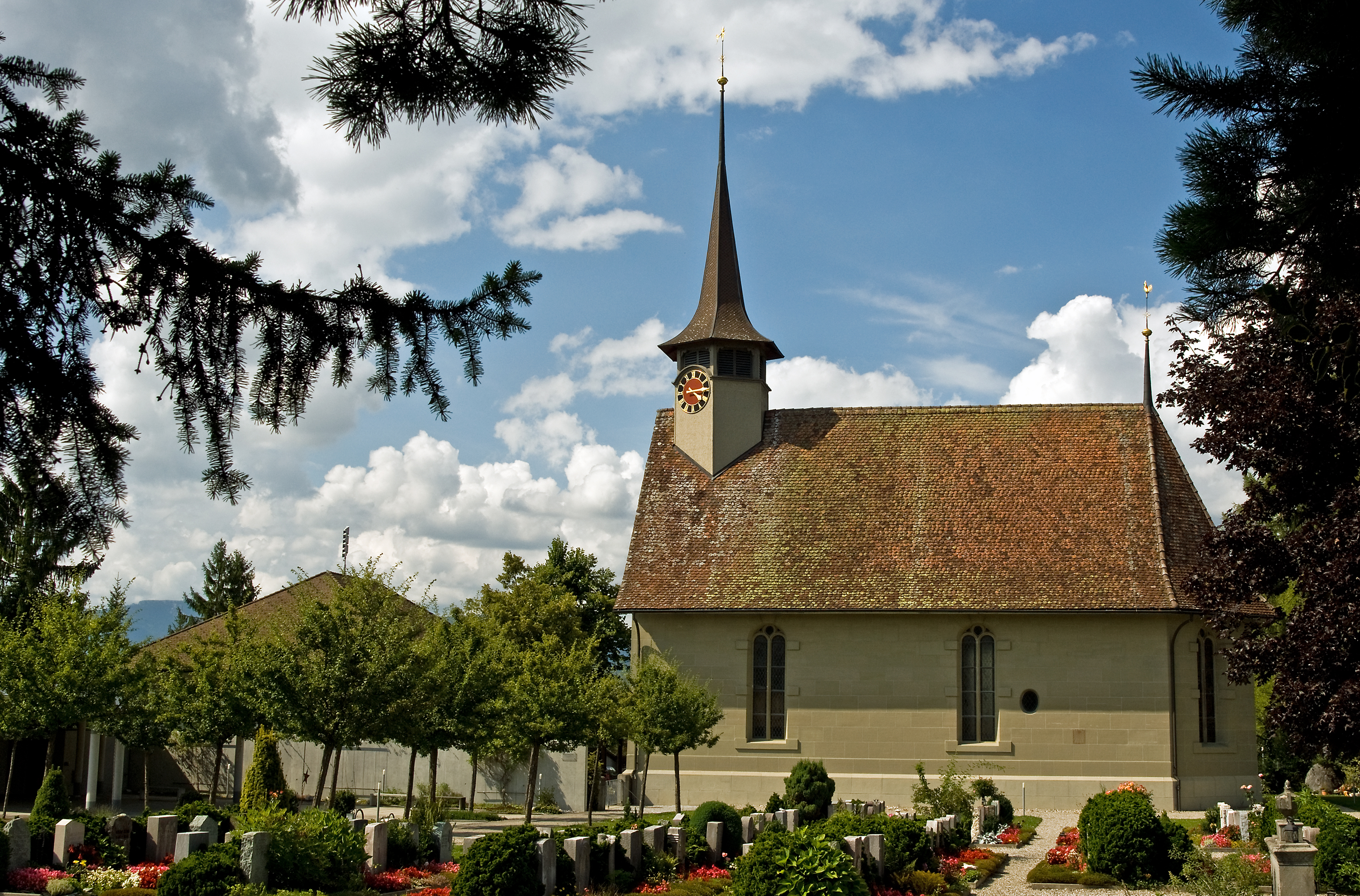
- Bätterkinden village church

- Flag Coat of arms
- Location of Bätterkinden
- Location within Switzerland Location within Canton of Bern
- Coordinates: 47°8′N 7°32′E
- Country: Switzerland
- Canton: Bern
- District: Emmental

Government
  - Executive: Gemeinderat with 7 members
  - Mayor: Gemeindepräsident(in); Peter Kuhnert SPS/PSS (as of 2026)

Area
  - Total: 10.19 km^{2} (3.93 sq mi)
- Elevation: 473 m (1,552 ft)

Population (December 2020)
  - Total: 3,288
  - Density: 322.7/km^{2} (835.7/sq mi)
- Time zone: UTC+01:00 (CET)
  - Summer (DST): UTC+02:00 (CEST)
- Postal code: 3315
- SFOS number: 533
- ISO 3166 code: CH-BE
- Localities: Bätterkinden, Kräiligen, Alp, Holzhäusern, Berchtoldshof, Buuchi, Studenacher, Löffelhof, Neumatt, Niedermatt, Rütti
- Surrounded by: Aefligen, Fraubrunnen, Limpach, Schalunen, Utzenstorf, Wiler bei Utzenstorf, and Zielebach (Canton of Bern); Aetingen, Biberist, Gerlafingen, Küttigkofen, Kyburg-Buchegg, Lohn-Ammannsegg, and Lüterkofen (Canton of Solothurn)
- Website: https://www.baetterkinden.ch/

Bätterkinden (High Alemannic: Bätterchinge) is a municipality in the administrative district of Emmental in the canton of Bern in Switzerland. It is about 20 km (12 mi) north of Bern.

== History ==
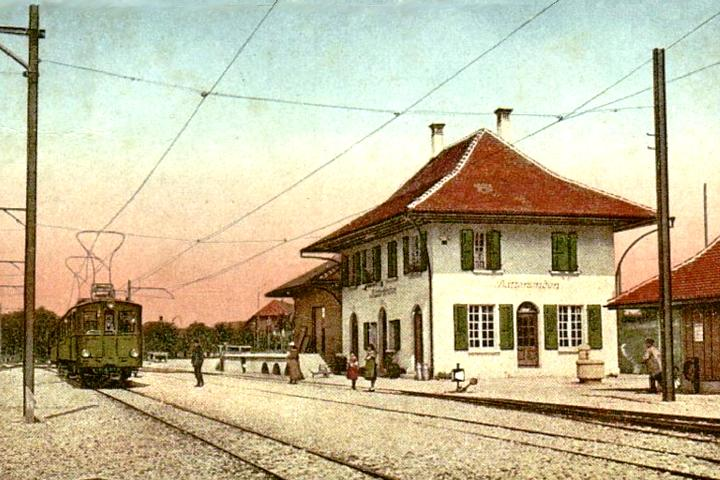
Post card showing Elektrischen Schmalspurbahn Solothurn-Bern (ESB, now RBS) trolley station in Bätterkinden in 1916.

Bätterkinden is first mentioned in 1261 as Beturchingen.

During the High Middle Ages there was a settlement on the Zwingherrenhubel. By 1261, Bätterkinden village was part of the Kyburg Amt of Utzenstorf. In 1406, the Kyburgs pledged Bätterkinden to Heinrich Ringoltingen to repay some of their debts. He combined Bätterkinden and Utzenstorf into the Herrschaft of Landshut. In 1510, Bern acquired Bätterkinden and four years later the rest of the Herrschaft of Landshut.

Following the 1798 French invasion, Bätterkinden became part of the Helvetic Republic district of Burgdorf. After the Act of Mediation in 1803, it was transferred to the Fraubrunnen district. The village was destroyed in a fire and rebuilt in 1882. The new Zelgli district was built in 1979.

The village church was first mentioned in 1275. The church, along with a farm in Gächliwil, was originally owned by the Herrschaft of Buchegg. In 1399 the church and its estates were given to the hospice in Bern. In 1595 the church was administered by the bailiff in Landshut. The old church was replaced in 1664 by a new building.

During the 18th and 19th centuries, farmers began to grow potatoes and sugar beets and raise cattle in addition to grain which they had traditionally raised. A dairy was built in Bätterkinden in 1848 and in Krailigen in 1867 for the new dairy farmers. An agricultural cooperative was founded in 1897 to support the farmers. The village was once on the Bern-Solothurn-Basel highway and had a toll station in Krailigen, but now it is bypassed by the major transportation routes. While the Bern-Solothurn railway station and a bridge over the Emme river provide local transportation, very little industry settled in the village. A wood pulp factory opened in 1865 and converted into a paper mill in 1893 before closing in 1930. In 1921 a gravel factory opened and it converted into a concrete factory in 1974. A metal parts factory opened in 1949. While some of the residents work in local industry or agriculture, over two-thirds of workers, in 1990, commuted to jobs in Bern. The municipal secondary school was founded in 1846 as a private school.

== Geography ==
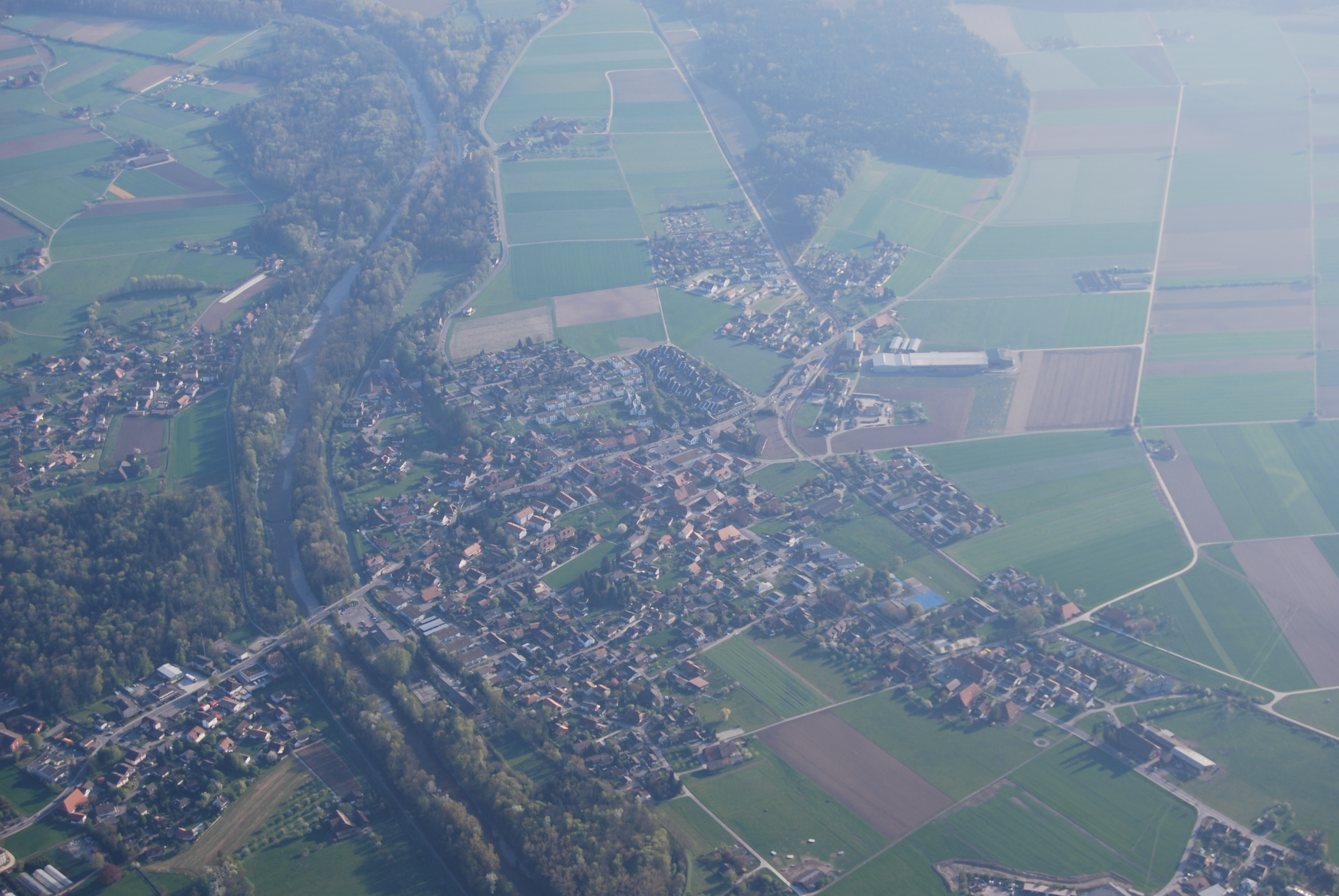
Aerial view of Bätterkinden

Bätterkinden has an area of 10.19 km^{2} (3.93 sq mi). Of this area, 5.88 km^{2} (2.27 mi^{2}) or 57.8% is used for agricultural purposes, while 2.45 km^{2} (0.95 mi^{2}) or 24.1% is forested. Of the rest of the land, 1.57 km^{2} (0.61 mi^{2}) or 15.4% is settled (buildings or roads), 0.21 km^{2} (0.081 mi^{2}) or 2.1% is either rivers or lakes.

Aerial view (1953)

Over the past two decades (1979/85-2004/09) the amount of land that is settled has increased by 52 ha (130 acres) and the agricultural land has decreased by 52 ha (130 acres).

Of the built up area, industrial buildings made up 1.7% of the total area while housing and buildings made up 7.6% and transportation infrastructure made up 2.8%. while parks, green belts and sports fields made up 2.9%. Out of the forested land, all of the forested land area is covered with heavy forests. Of the agricultural land, 50.7% is used for growing crops and 6.4% is pastures. All the water in the municipality is flowing water.

Bätterkinden lies west of the Emme and Urtenen rivers, and on the Limpach river. It consists of the villages of Bätterkinden and Kräiligen and the hamlets of Alp, Holzhäusern and Berchtoldshof as well as scattered farm houses. The municipality is runs about 7.4 km (4.6 mi) north to south.

On 31 December 2009 Amtsbezirk Fraubrunnen, the municipality's former district, was dissolved. On the following day, 1 January 2010, it joined the newly created Verwaltungskreis Emmental.

== Coat of arms ==
The blazon of the municipal coat of arms is Gules an Ear Or and in Chief of the last three Pales wavy Azure.

== Demographics ==
Bätterkinden has a population (as of December 2020) of 3,288. As of 2013, 6.6% of the population are resident foreign nationals. Over the last 3 years (2010-2013) the population has changed at a rate of -0.06%. The birth rate in the municipality, in 2013, was 10.8 while the death rate was 8.3 per thousand residents.

Most of the population (as of 2000) speaks German (2,562 or 94.9%) as their first language, Albanian is the second most common (21 or 0.8%) and Italian is the third (16 or 0.6%). There are 15 people who speak French and 2 people who speak Romansh.

As of 2008, the population was 47.8% male and 52.2% female. The population was made up of 1,397 Swiss men (44.4% of the population) and 105 (3.3%) non-Swiss men. There were 1,562 Swiss women (49.7%) and 80 (2.5%) non-Swiss women. Of the population in the municipality, 776 or about 28.7% were born in Bätterkinden and lived there in 2000. There were 1,047 or 38.8% who were born in the same canton, while 556 or 20.6% were born somewhere else in Switzerland, and 229 or 8.5% were born outside of Switzerland.

As of 2013, children and teenagers (0–19 years old) make up 20.9% of the population, while adults (20–64 years old) are 61.8% and seniors (over 64 years old) make up 17.3%.

As of 2000, there were 1,086 people who were single and never married in the municipality. There were 1,378 married individuals, 123 widows or widowers and 113 individuals who are divorced.

As of 2000, there were 264 households that consist of only one person and 80 households with five or more people. In 2000, a total of 1,046 apartments (95.5% of the total) were permanently occupied, while 24 apartments (2.2%) were seasonally occupied and 25 apartments (2.3%) were empty. In 2013 there were 1,325 private households in Bätterkinden. Of the 742 inhabited buildings in the municipality, in 2000, about 66.3% were single family homes and 17.1% were multiple family buildings. Additionally, about 15.9% of the buildings were built before 1919, while 11.5% were built between 1991 and 2000. In 2012 the rate of construction of new housing units per 1000 residents was 2.24. The vacancy rate for the municipality, in 2014, was 1.64%.

The historical population is given in the following chart:

== Heritage sites of national significance ==
The farm house at Solothurnstrasse 39 and the village church at Bernstrasse 15 are listed as Swiss heritage site of national significance.

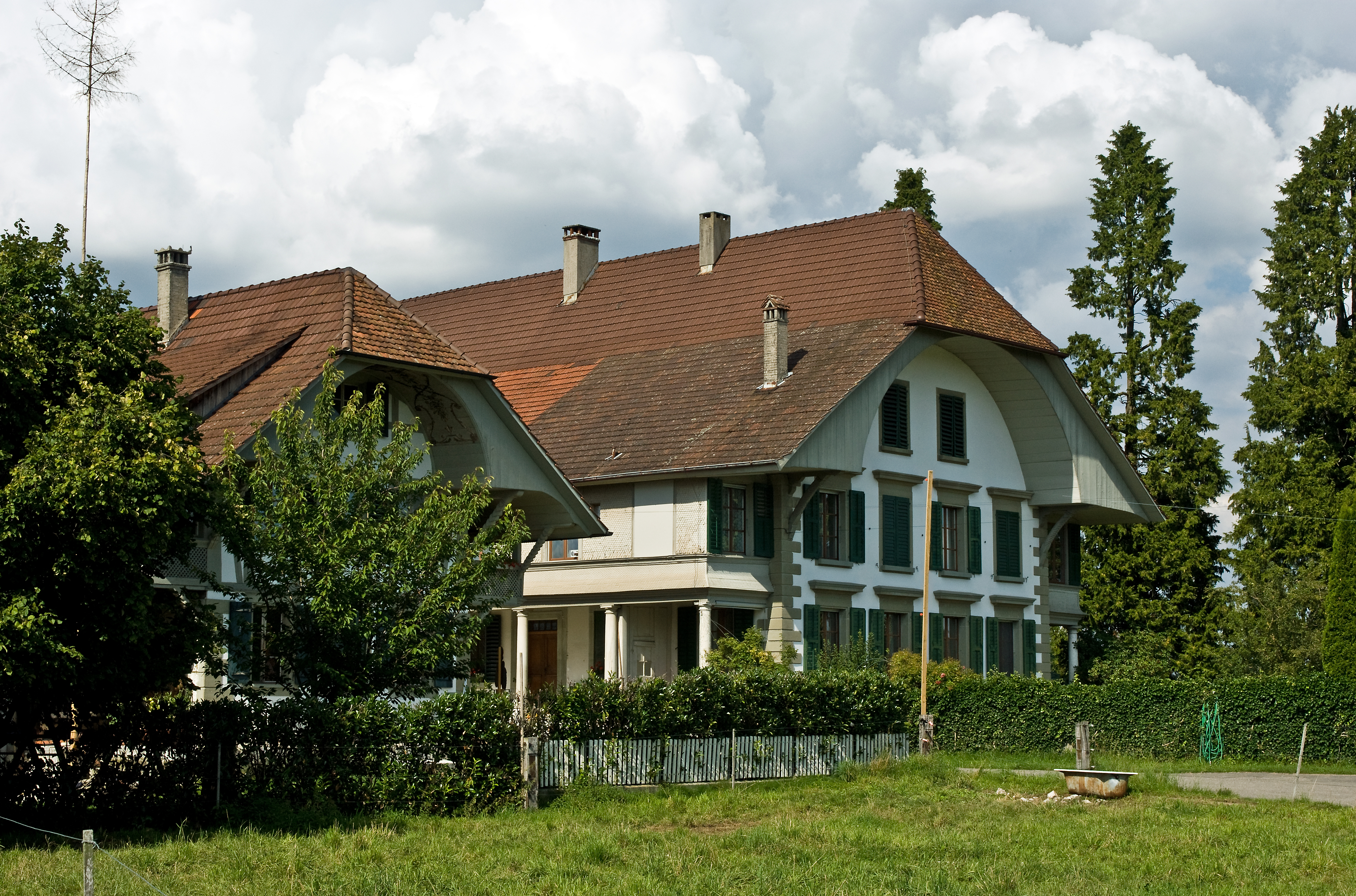
Farm house at Solothurnstrasse 39

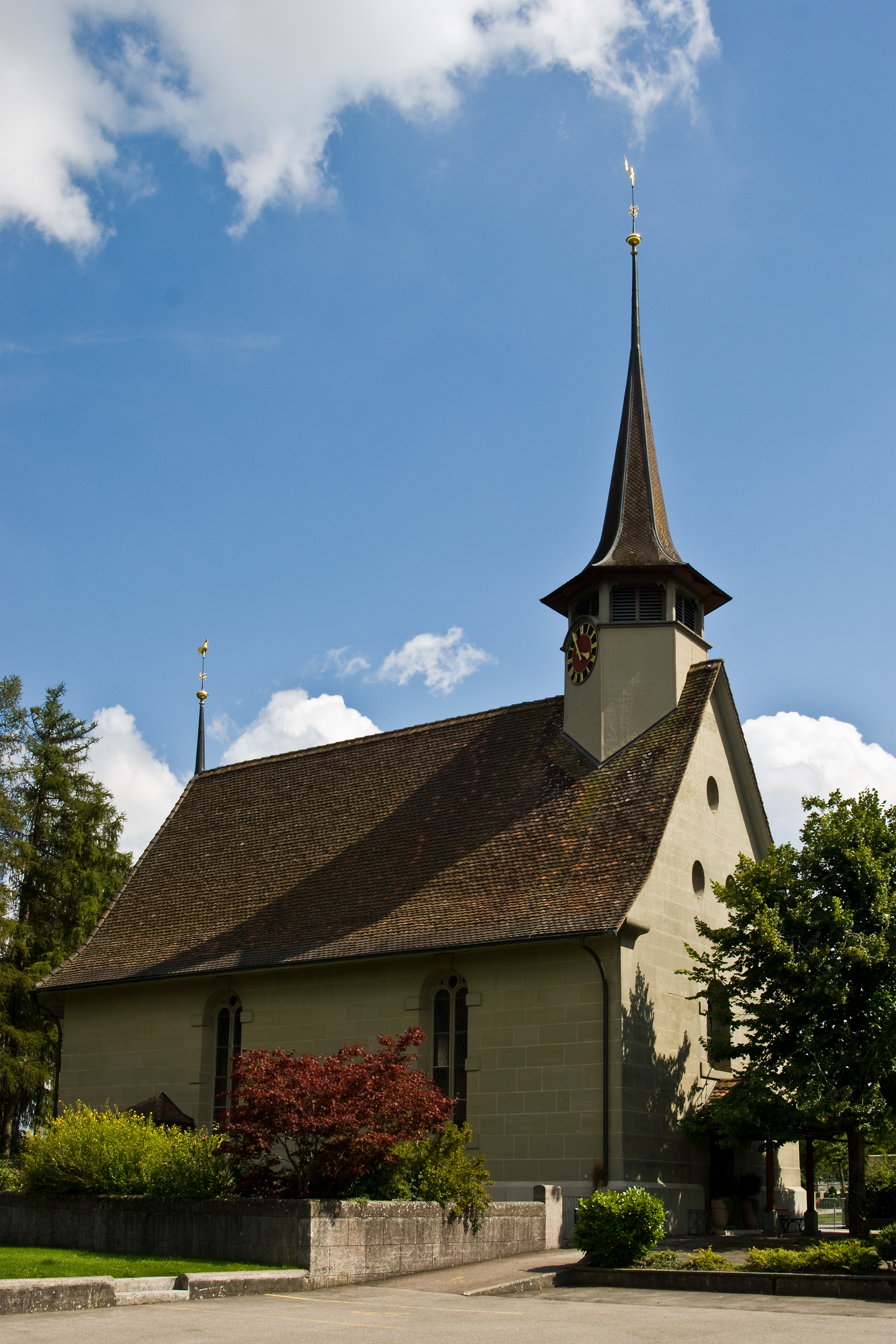
Village church at Bernstrasse 15

== Politics ==
The municipal assembly, which consists of all Swiss residents aged 18 and older living in the municipality for at least 3 months, forms the legislature.

The municipal council is the executive, and consists of seven members chosen by proportional representation. In the current term (2004–2007), there are three members from the Swiss People's Party (SVP), three from the Social Democratic Party of Switzerland (SPS), and one from the Free Democratic Party of Switzerland (FDP). The mayor, Rosmarie Habegger-Scheidegger, is in the SVP.

In the 2011 federal election the most popular party was the Swiss People's Party (SVP) which received 25.7% of the vote. The next three most popular parties were the Social Democratic Party (SP) (22%), the Conservative Democratic Party (BDP) (20.8%) and the Green Party (8.7%). In the federal election, a total of 1,199 votes were cast, and the voter turnout was 49.4%.

== Economy ==
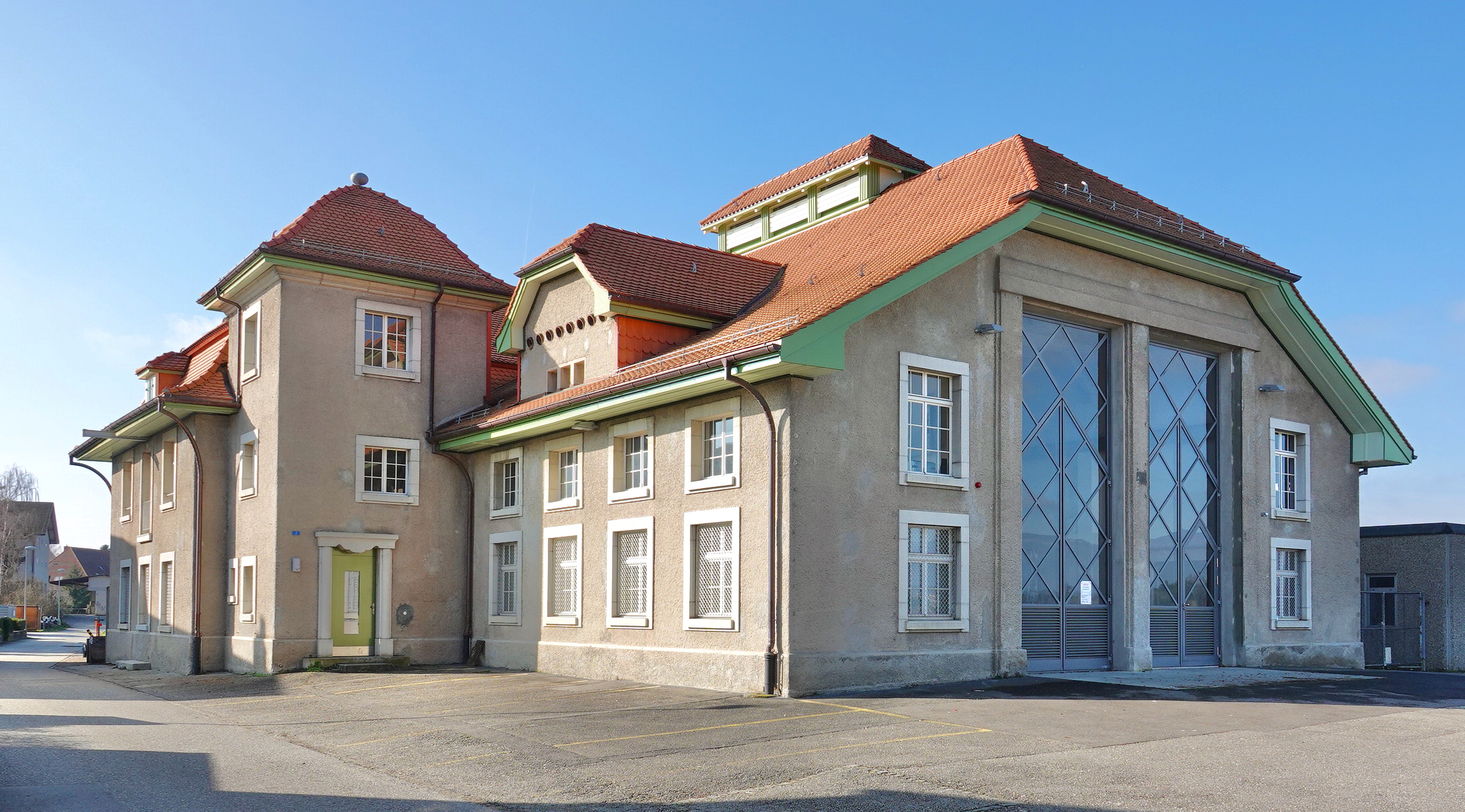
Former electric substation, now used as commercial building

As of 2011, Bätterkinden had an unemployment rate of 2.85%. As of 2008, there were a total of 751 people employed in the municipality. Of these, there were 87 people employed in the primary economic sector and about 25 businesses involved in this sector. 217 people were employed in the secondary sector and there were 27 businesses in this sector. 447 people were employed in the tertiary sector, with 71 businesses in this sector. There were 1,484 residents of the municipality who were employed in some capacity, of which females made up 43.9% of the workforce.

In 2008 there were a total of 604 full-time equivalent jobs. The number of jobs in the primary sector was 53, of which 50 were in agriculture and 3 were in fishing or fisheries. The number of jobs in the secondary sector was 201 of which 101 or (50.2%) were in manufacturing and 85 (42.3%) were in construction. The number of jobs in the tertiary sector was 350. In the tertiary sector; 173 or 49.4% were in wholesale or retail sales or the repair of motor vehicles, 14 or 4.0% were in the movement and storage of goods, 40 or 11.4% were in a hotel or restaurant, 20 or 5.7% were technical professionals or scientists, 32 or 9.1% were in education and 17 or 4.9% were in health care.

In 2000, there were 306 workers who commuted into the municipality and 1,075 workers who commuted away. The municipality is a net exporter of workers, with about 3.5 workers leaving the municipality for every one entering. Of the working population, 25.7% used public transportation to get to work, and 46.8% used a private car.

== Religion ==
From the 2000 census, 326 or 12.1% were Roman Catholic, while 1,931 or 71.5% belonged to the Swiss Reformed Church. Of the rest of the population, there were 25 members of an Orthodox church (or about 0.93% of the population), there was 1 individual who belongs to the Christian Catholic Church, and there were 102 individuals (or about 3.78% of the population) who belonged to another Christian church. There was 1 individual who was Jewish, and 49 (or about 1.81% of the population) who were Islamic. There were 7 individuals who were Buddhist, 19 individuals who were Hindu and 3 individuals who belonged to another church. 190 (or about 7.04% of the population) belonged to no church, are agnostic or atheist, and 95 individuals (or about 3.52% of the population) did not answer the question.

== Education ==
In Bätterkinden about 1,115 or (41.3%) of the population have completed non-mandatory upper secondary education, and 302 or (11.2%) have completed additional higher education (either university or a Fachhochschule). Of the 302 who completed tertiary schooling, 73.2% were Swiss men, 22.2% were Swiss women, 3.0% were non-Swiss men and 1.7% were non-Swiss women.

The Canton of Bern school system provides one year of non-obligatory Kindergarten, followed by six years of Primary school. This is followed by three years of obligatory lower Secondary school where the students are separated according to ability and aptitude. Following the lower Secondary students may attend additional schooling or they may enter an apprenticeship.

During the 2010–11 school year, there were a total of 383 students attending classes in Bätterkinden. There were 3 kindergarten classes with a total of 61 students in the municipality. Of the kindergarten students, 8.2% were permanent or temporary residents of Switzerland (not citizens) and 6.6% have a different mother language than the classroom language. The municipality had 11 primary classes and 224 students. Of the primary students, 4.9% were permanent or temporary residents of Switzerland (not citizens) and 8.0% have a different mother language than the classroom language. During the same year, there were 7 lower secondary classes with a total of 98 students. There were 5.1% who were permanent or temporary residents of Switzerland (not citizens) and 6.1% have a different mother language than the classroom language.

As of 2000, there were 23 students in Bätterkinden who came from another municipality, while 108 residents attended schools outside the municipality.

Bätterkinden is home to the Bibliothek Bätterkinden library. The library has (as of 2008) 10,330 books or other media, and loaned out 23,261 items in the same year. It was open a total of 198 days with average of 8 hours per week during that year.

== Crime ==
In 2014 the crime rate, of the over 200 crimes listed in the Swiss Criminal Code (running from murder, robbery and assault to accepting bribes and election fraud), in Bätterkinden was 36.6 per thousand residents. This rate is lower than average, at only 53.1% of the rate in the district, 62.2% of the cantonal rate and 56.7% of the average rate in the entire country. During the same period, the rate of drug crimes was 2.5 per thousand residents. This rate is lower than average, at only 25.3% of the national rate. The rate of violations of immigration, visa and work permit laws was 0.6 per thousand residents, which was only 12.2% of the rate for the entire country.

== Transportation ==
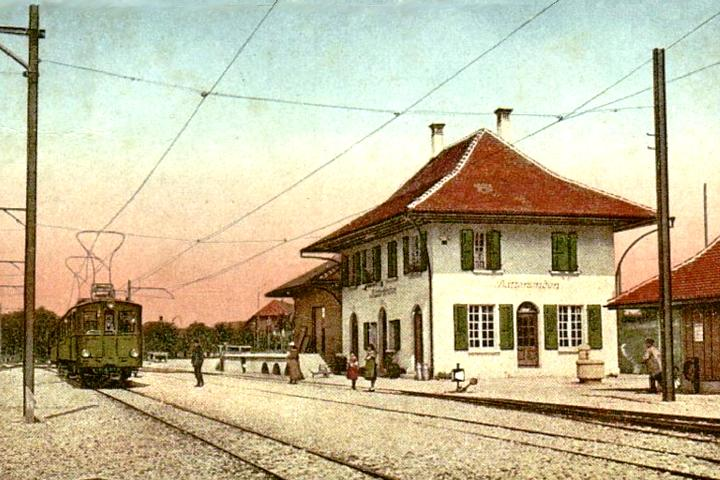
Postcard from 1916 showing the RBS Bätterkinden station

The city is a stop on the Regionalverkehr Bern-Solothurn (RBS), which runs on a synchronized timetable, generally every half-hour. The time required to reach Solothurn is 12 minutes and Bern 26. There are also bus connections.

In Bätterkinden two canton roads cross, the T12 Solothurn-Bern (north-south) and the Lyss-Utzenstorf-Koppigen/Burgdorf road (east-west). There is also the canton road which connects Bätterkinden to Bucheggberg via Kyburg.

The A1 entrances Kirchberg (in the direction of Bern) and Kriegstetten (in the direction of Basel and Zürich) can each be reached in about a 10 minutes' drive.

== Notable people ==
- Florian Ast (born 1975 in Solothurn), rock musician
- Jeremias Lorza (born 1757 in Silvaplana, died 1837 in Bätterkinden), theologian
- Benedictus Aretius (born 1522 in Bätterkinden, died 1574 in Bern), theologian, teacher, geographer, and reformer
