= Utzenstorf =

- Municipality
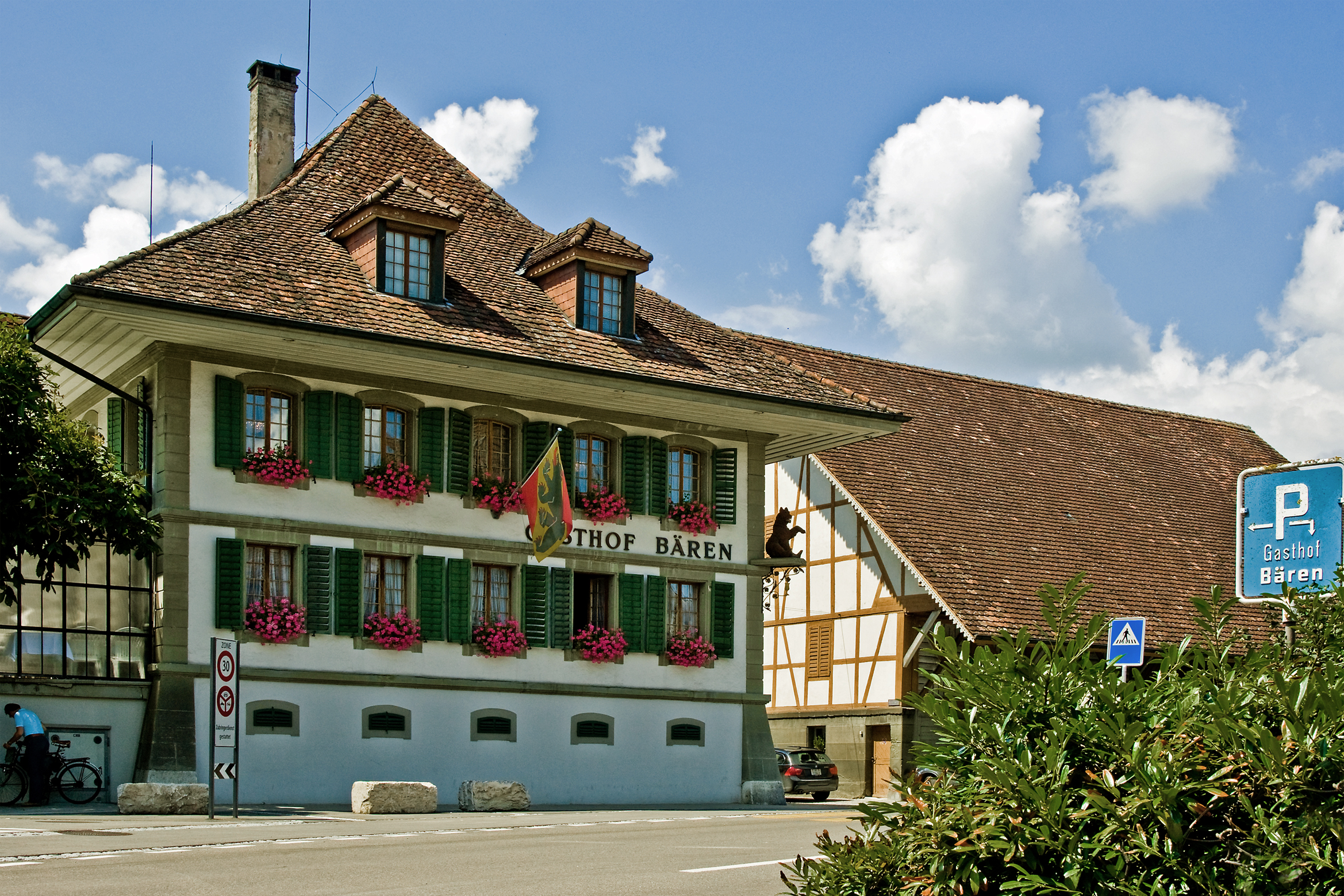
- Gasthof Bären in Utzenstorf village

- Flag Coat of arms
- Location of Utzenstorf
- Location within Switzerland Location within Canton of Bern
- Coordinates: 47°8′N 7°33′E
- Country: Switzerland
- Canton: Bern
- District: Emmental

Government
  - Executive: Gemeinderat with 7 members
  - Mayor: Gemeindepräsident(in); Beat Singer SVP/UDC (as of 2026)

Area
  - Total: 17.0 km^{2} (6.6 sq mi)
- Elevation: 476 m (1,562 ft)

Population (December 2020)
  - Total: 4,430
  - Density: 261/km^{2} (675/sq mi)
- Time zone: UTC+01:00 (CET)
  - Summer (DST): UTC+02:00 (CEST)
- Postal code: 3427
- SFOS number: 552
- ISO 3166 code: CH-BE
- Surrounded by: Aefligen, Bätterkinden, Ersigen, Kirchberg, Koppigen, Niederösch, Obergerlafingen (SO), Oberösch, Rüdtligen-Alchenflüh, Wiler bei Utzenstorf, Zielebach
- Website: www.utzenstorf.ch

Utzenstorf is a municipality in the administrative district of Emmental in the canton of Bern in Switzerland. It is regionally famous for its medieval castle, Landshut Castle.

== History ==
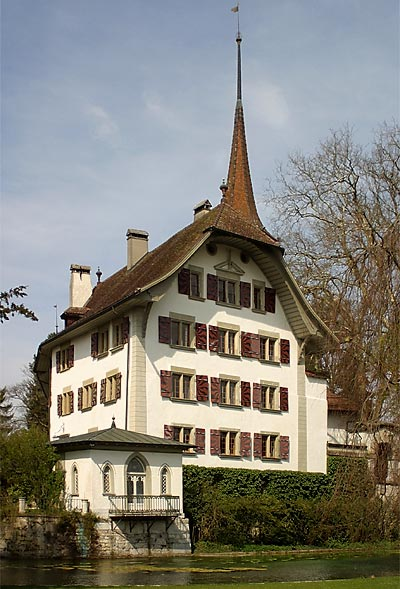
Landshut Castle

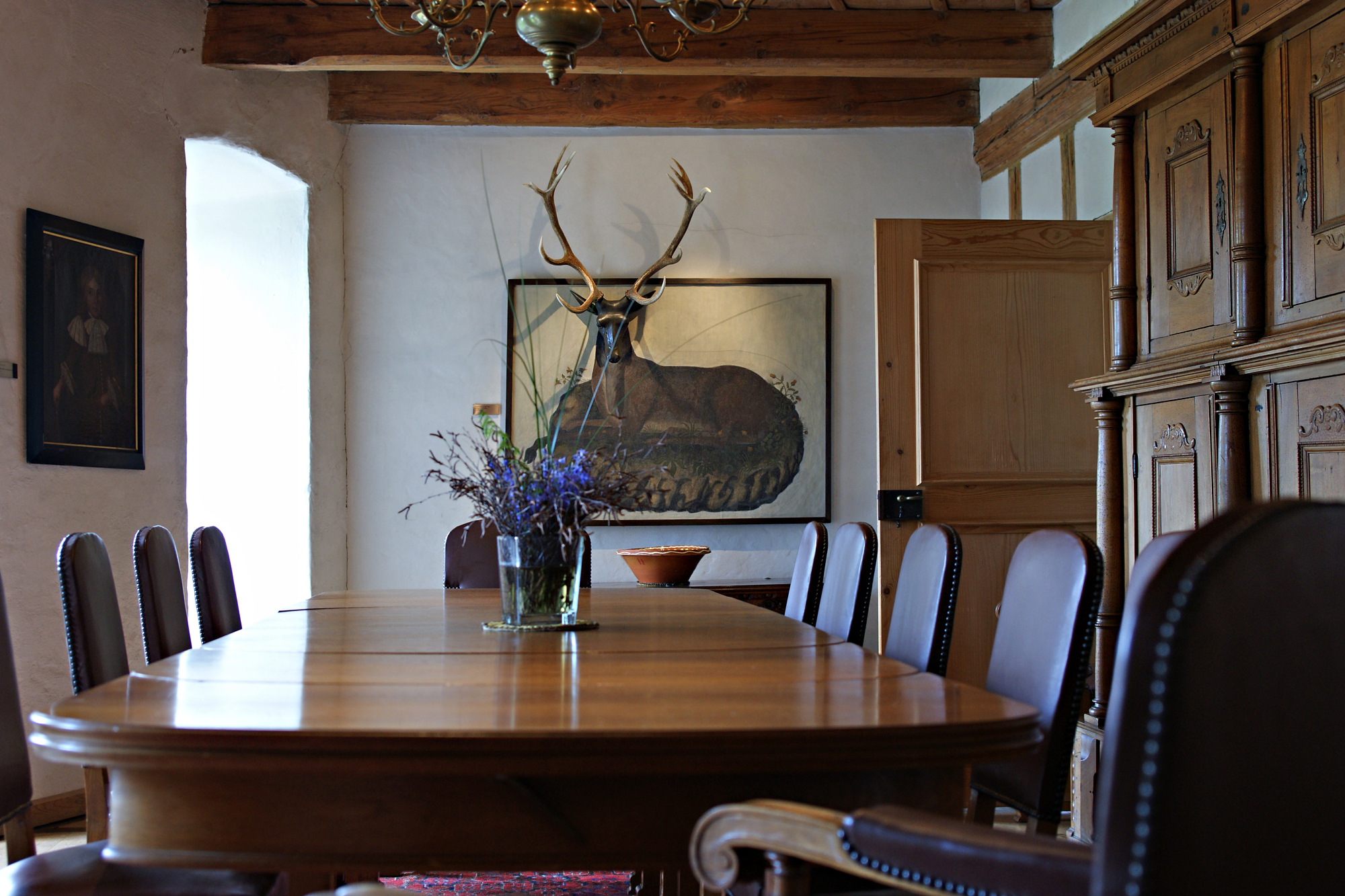
Prince's room in Landshut Castle

Aerial view from 200 m by Walter Mittelholzer (1920)

Utzenstorf is first mentioned in 1175 as Uzansdorf.

The oldest trace of a settlement in the municipality is the Neolithic hilltop settlement at Bürglenhubel. The Bürglenhubel site includes traces of an earthen wall, turf houses and flint tools. There are several other prehistoric sites in the municipality, including scatter neolithic items at Lindenrain and a La Tene culture grave at Schnäggefeld.

When the area was part of the Kingdom of Burgundy, the county of Uranestorfus was mentioned in a record from 1009. Under the Dukes of Zähringen Landshut Castle was the administrative center of the Amt or township of Utzenstorf. The Amt included both the upper village (Ober-Utzenstorf) and the lower village (Unter-Utzenstorf) and included ownership of all land along with the right to hold both the high and low courts. When the Zähringen line died out, the Amt was inherited by the Counts of Kyburg. During the Gümmenenkrieg in 1332, the castle was attacked by troops from Bern and Solothurn and destroyed. It was rebuilt shortly thereafter. At the end of the 14th century, the Kyburgs were forced to pawn the castle and the Amt. It was acquired by Rudolf von Ringoltingen from Bern, who combined several estates into the Amt. In 1479 Ludwig von Diesbach inherited the estate from the Ringoltingen family. However, in 1514 the city of Bern bought the castle and Amt from the Diesbachs. Under Bernese rule, the castle became the center of the bailiwick of Landshut.

During the High Middle Ages the villages were part of the parish of Kirchberg. A village church was probably built in the 11th or 12th century, but it was first mentioned in 1275. A new church, dedicated to St. Martin, was built on the same site in 1457. In 1481, Bern acquired the right to collect tithes from the two villages. The villages adopted the Protestant Reformation when Bern converted. The church became the Reformed parish church over a parish that included the two villages, Wiler bei Utzenstorf and Zielebach. In 1804 the father of the future novelist Albert Bitzius, who would be better known by his pen name Jeremias Gotthelf, became the pastor at Utzenstorf. Young Albert lived in the village until 1812 when he left to continue his education. He returned a few years later and worked as his father's vicar, though he left to be a vicar in Herzogenbuchsee after his father's death in 1824. Many of his novels feature peasants from the Emmental and are probably influenced by his time in Utzenstorf.

The municipality remained mostly Protestant, but in 1960 a Roman Catholic church was built in Utzenstorf for the surrounding 24 municipalities.

During the 16th century, Utzenstorf began to expand, causing border conflicts and disagreements with neighboring municipalities. It quarreled with Bätterkinden from 1505 until 1526 and with Wiler and Zielebach in 1596. The villages and surrounding fields were often devastated when the Emme flooded. The municipality tried to build levees along the river in the 17th century, but they still suffered floods until the Canton adjusted the river course in 1884. A village school was built in 1892. The Solothurn-Burgdorf Railroad built a rail line and station in Utzenstorf in 1875. The line connected the municipality to rest of the country and allowed industry to move into the area. The first industrial factory, a paper mill, opened in 1892. Two years later, a biscuit factory opened and remained in operation until 1952. The first two factories were followed by other factories.

=== Swiss Central Airport Utzenstorf ===
The Swiss Central Airport Utzenstorf - German Schweizerischer Zentralflughafen Utzenstorf (47.1109°N 7.5708°E) - was a project for an intercontinental airport, located about 23 kilometers north of Bern and about 10 kilometers south of Solothurn. The proposal to build an international airport along the banks of Emme river in 1945 failed due to opposition from the residents.

During World War II, the government of the Canton of Bern created a study group to prepare a project. The obstacle-free area near Utzenstorf was deemed ideal, and the Canton then handed the project over the federal government. Because of massive opposition to the project, mainly by farmers - some of the most fertile Swiss ground would have to be sacrificed for an airport - the swampy area near Kloten in the canton of Zurich was finally selected by the Swiss government. Another advantage of Kloten was that the area already belonged to the federal government - it was a military training area.

In hindsight, Utzenstorf would have been the better place for a large airport: Today, both a highway and the newly built high-speed railway line Mattstetten-Rothrist would have supplied the airport with both passenger and freight connections. In addition, the airport operation would not be affected by the German frontier, as it is now the case with Zurich Airport.

=== 1970-90 ===
In the 1970s and 80s several new neighborhoods were built to house the growing population.

== Geography ==
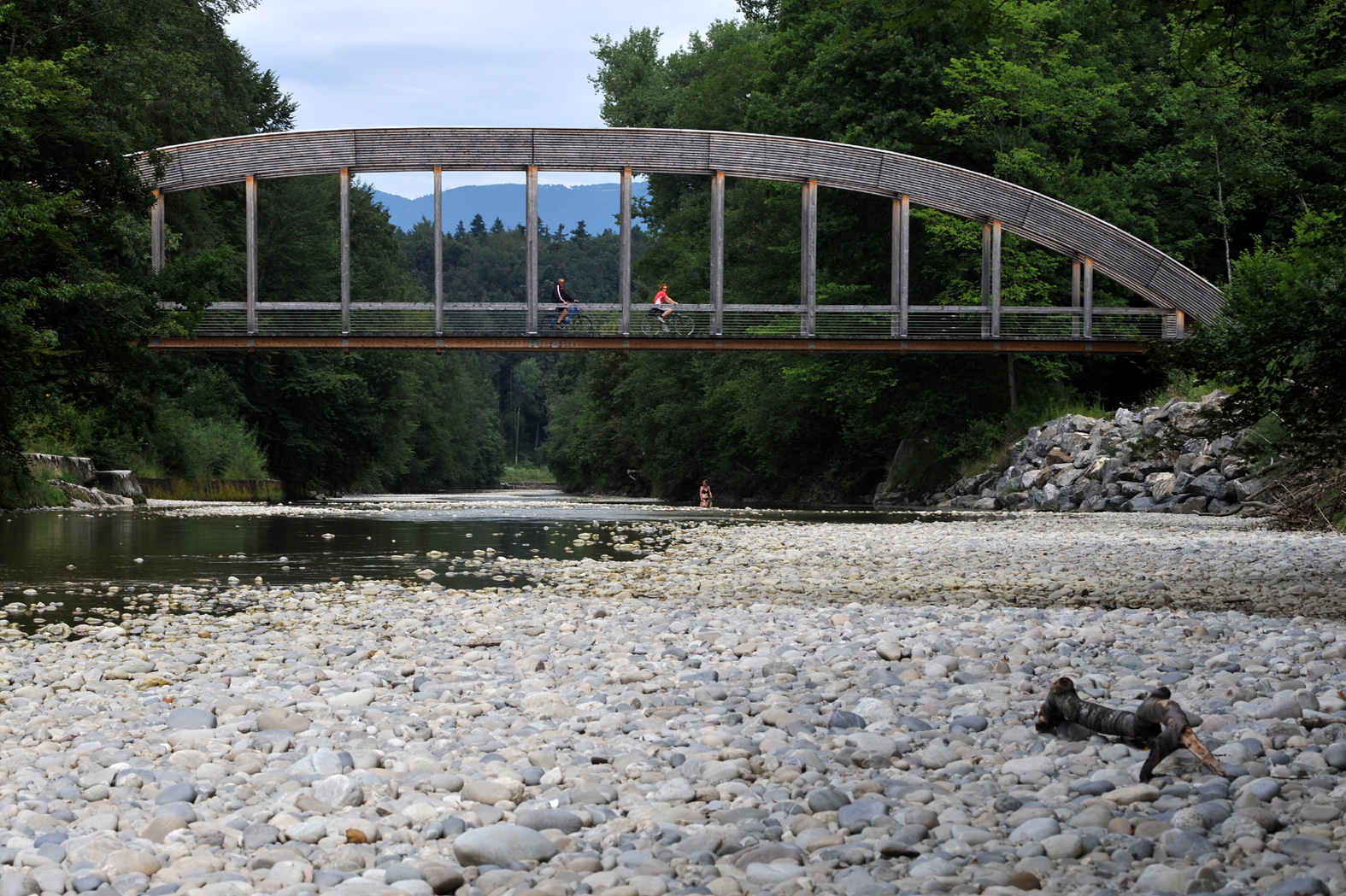
The Emmensteg, the longest wooden bridge crossing river Emme, between Utzenstorf and Bätterkinden

Utzenstorf has an area of 16.94 km^{2} (6.54 sq mi). Of this area, 10.07 km^{2} (3.89 mi^{2}) or 59.5% is used for agricultural purposes, while 4.56 km^{2} (1.76 mi^{2}) or 26.9% is forested. Of the rest of the land, 2.15 km^{2} (0.83 mi^{2}) or 12.7% is settled (buildings or roads), 0.15 km^{2} (37 acres) or 0.9% is either rivers or lakes and 0.03 km^{2} (7.4 acres) or 0.2% is unproductive land.

Of the built up area, industrial buildings made up 1.8% of the total area while housing and buildings made up 6.4% and transportation infrastructure made up 3.2%. Out of the forested land, all of the forested land area is covered with heavy forests. Of the agricultural land, 50.8% is used for growing crops and 7.4% is pastures, while 1.2% is used for orchards or vine crops. All the water in the municipality is flowing water.

The municipality is located in the Emmental along the right bank of the Emme river. It consists of the villages of Ober-Utzenstorf and Unter-Utzenstorf, the hamlets of Schachen, Ei and Altwiden, Landshut Castle and other scattered farm houses.

On 31 December 2009 Amtsbezirk Fraubrunnen, the municipality's former district, was dissolved. On the following day, 1 January 2010, it joined the newly created Verwaltungskreis Emmental.

== Coat of arms ==
The blazon of the municipal coat of arms is Per pale Vert and Argent four Linden Leaves conjoined in saltire counterchanged.

== Demographics ==
Utzenstorf has a population (as of December 2020) of 4,430. As of 2010, 7.5% of the population are resident foreign nationals. Over the last 10 years (2000-2010) the population has changed at a rate of 11.6%. Migration accounted for 10.5%, while births and deaths accounted for 0.7%.

Most of the population (as of 2000) speaks German (3,485 or 95.5%) as their first language, Albanian is the second most common (25 or 0.7%) and Italian is the third (24 or 0.7%). There are 14 people who speak French and 1 person who speaks Romansh.

As of 2008, the population was 49.9% male and 50.1% female. The population was made up of 1,872 Swiss men (45.9% of the population) and 164 (4.0%) non-Swiss men. There were 1,904 Swiss women (46.7%) and 141 (3.5%) non-Swiss women. Of the population in the municipality, 1,186 or about 32.5% were born in Utzenstorf and lived there in 2000. There were 1,434 or 39.3% who were born in the same canton, while 584 or 16.0% were born somewhere else in Switzerland, and 303 or 8.3% were born outside of Switzerland.

As of 2010, children and teenagers (0–19 years old) make up 21.3% of the population, while adults (20–64 years old) make up 62% and seniors (over 64 years old) make up 16.7%.

As of 2000, there were 1,517 people who were single and never married in the municipality. There were 1,774 married individuals, 213 widows or widowers and 145 individuals who are divorced.

As of 2000, there were 424 households that consist of only one person and 96 households with five or more people. In 2000, a total of 1,440 apartments (91.8% of the total) were permanently occupied, while 88 apartments (5.6%) were seasonally occupied and 41 apartments (2.6%) were empty. As of 2010, the construction rate of new housing units was 2.7 new units per 1000 residents. The vacancy rate for the municipality, in 2011, was 3.82%.

The historical population is given in the following chart:

== Heritage sites of national significance ==
The neolithic settlement at Bürglenhubel, the Gasthof Bären and Landshut Castle are listed as Swiss heritage site of national significance. The entire area around Landshut Castle is part of the Inventory of Swiss Heritage Sites.

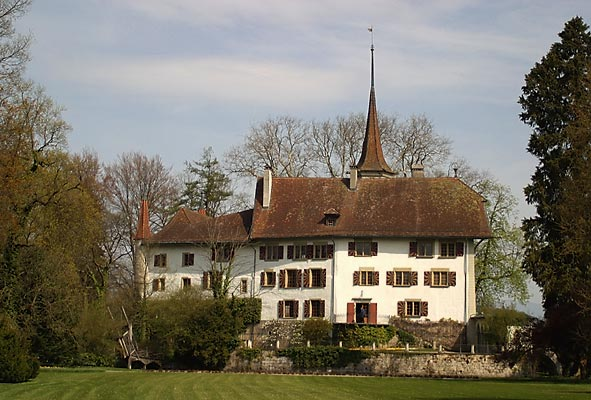
Landshut Castle

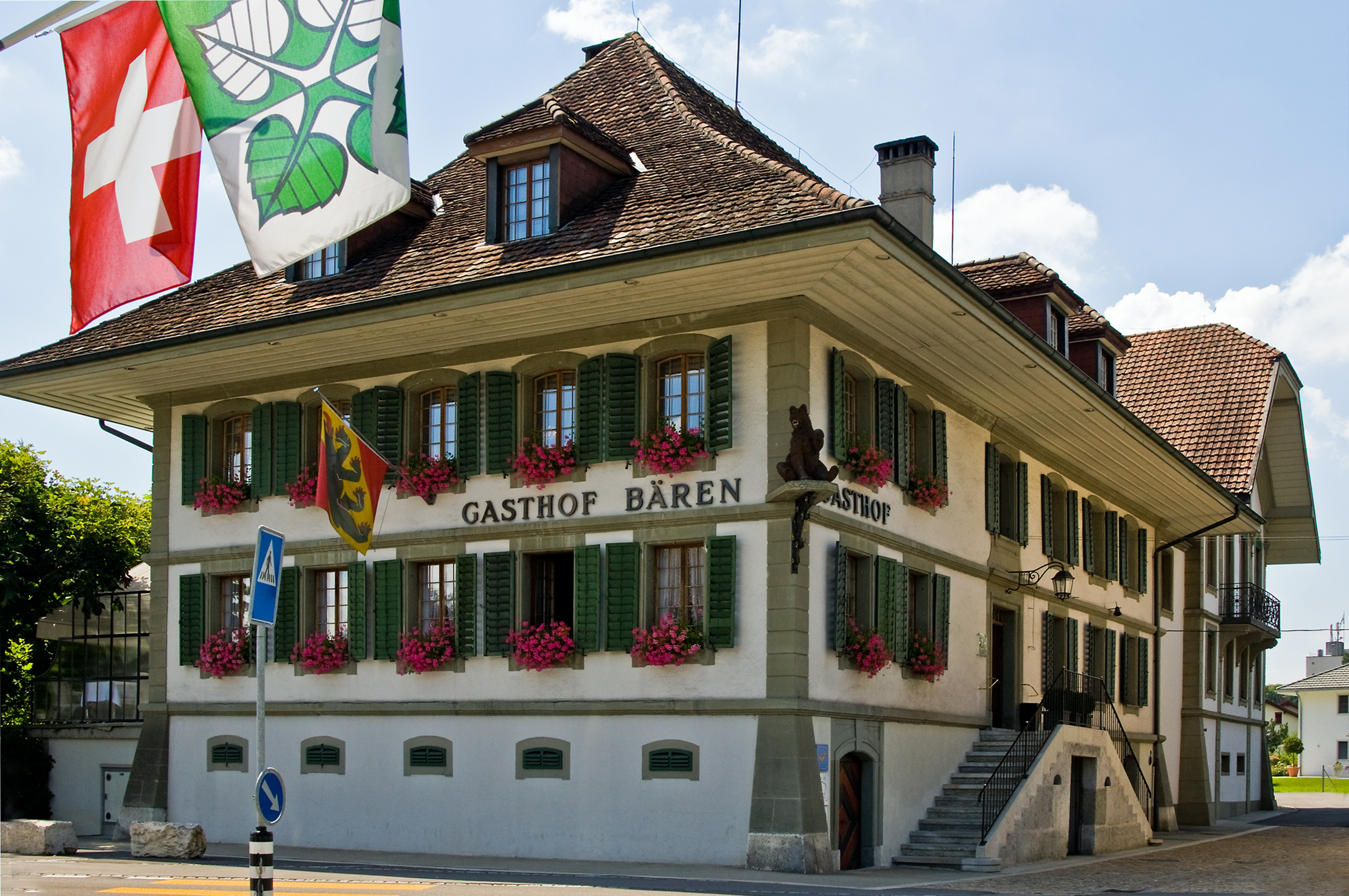

== Politics ==
In the 2011 federal election the most popular party was the Swiss People's Party (SVP) which received 32% of the vote. The next three most popular parties were the Conservative Democratic Party (BDP) (20.9%), the Social Democratic Party (SP) (19.4%) and the FDP.The Liberals (6.8%). In the federal election, a total of 1,527 votes were cast, and the voter turnout was 48.9%.

== Economy ==
As of 2011, Utzenstorf had an unemployment rate of 2.66%. As of 2008, there were a total of 1,871 people employed in the municipality. Of these, there were 124 people employed in the primary economic sector and about 41 businesses involved in this sector. 823 people were employed in the secondary sector and there were 47 businesses in this sector. 924 people were employed in the tertiary sector, with 112 businesses in this sector. There were 1,982 residents of the municipality who were employed in some capacity, of which females made up 42.8% of the workforce.

In 2008 there were a total of 1,609 full-time equivalent jobs. The number of jobs in the primary sector was 85, all of which were in agriculture. The number of jobs in the secondary sector was 785 of which 617 or (78.6%) were in manufacturing and 136 (17.3%) were in construction. The number of jobs in the tertiary sector was 739. In the tertiary sector; 267 or 36.1% were in wholesale or retail sales or the repair of motor vehicles, 115 or 15.6% were in the movement and storage of goods, 60 or 8.1% were in a hotel or restaurant, 28 or 3.8% were in the information industry, 18 or 2.4% were the insurance or financial industry, 50 or 6.8% were technical professionals or scientists, 38 or 5.1% were in education and 84 or 11.4% were in health care.

In 2000, there were 991 workers who commuted into the municipality and 1,184 workers who commuted away. The municipality is a net exporter of workers, with about 1.2 workers leaving the municipality for every one entering. Of the working population, 15.3% used public transportation to get to work, and 48.5% used a private car.

== Religion ==
From the 2000 census, 397 or 10.9% were Roman Catholic, while 2,769 or 75.9% belonged to the Swiss Reformed Church. Of the rest of the population, there were 18 members of an Orthodox church (or about 0.49% of the population), there was 1 individual who belongs to the Christian Catholic Church, and there were 127 individuals (or about 3.48% of the population) who belonged to another Christian church. There were 3 individuals (or about 0.08% of the population) who were Jewish, and 103 (or about 2.82% of the population) who were Islamic. There were 5 individuals who were Buddhist, 9 individuals who were Hindu and 6 individuals who belonged to another church. 154 (or about 4.22% of the population) belonged to no church, are agnostic or atheist, and 119 individuals (or about 3.26% of the population) did not answer the question.

== Education ==
In Utzenstorf about 1,522 or (41.7%) of the population have completed non-mandatory upper secondary education, and 399 or (10.9%) have completed additional higher education (either university or a Fachhochschule). Of the 399 who completed tertiary schooling, 74.7% were Swiss men, 19.3% were Swiss women, 4.8% were non-Swiss men and 1.3% were non-Swiss women.

The Canton of Bern school system provides one year of non-obligatory Kindergarten, followed by six years of Primary school. This is followed by three years of obligatory lower Secondary school where the students are separated according to ability and aptitude. Following the lower Secondary students may attend additional schooling or they may enter an apprenticeship.

During the 2010-11 school year, there were a total of 481 students attending classes in Utzenstorf. There were 3 kindergarten classes with a total of 70 students in the municipality. Of the kindergarten students, 5.7% were permanent or temporary residents of Switzerland (not citizens) and 18.6% have a different mother language than the classroom language. The municipality had 15 primary classes and 285 students. Of the primary students, 7.0% were permanent or temporary residents of Switzerland (not citizens) and 10.5% have a different mother language than the classroom language. During the same year, there were 7 lower secondary classes with a total of 126 students. There were 7.1% who were permanent or temporary residents of Switzerland (not citizens) and 6.3% have a different mother language than the classroom language.

As of 2000, there were 17 students in Utzenstorf who came from another municipality, while 118 residents attended schools outside the municipality.

== Notable residents ==
- Albert Bitzius (1797-1854) Swiss novelist, better known by his pen name Jeremias Gotthelf, lived in Utzenstorf as a boy.
- Jakob Steiner (1796-1863), Swiss mathematician, native.
