= Landshut Castle, Switzerland =

Castle in Utzenstorf, Bern, Switzerland

Landshut Castle
- Schloss Landshut
- Utzenstorf
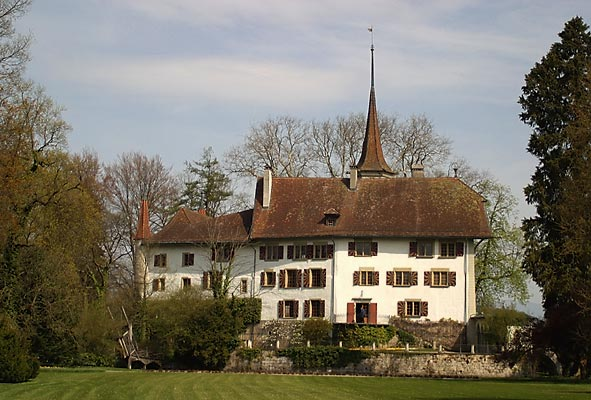
- Landshut Castle

Site information
- Owner: Schweizer Museum für Wild und Jagd
- Open to the public: yes

Location
- Location within Canton of Bern Location within Switzerland
- Coordinates: 47.137361°N 7.548613°E

Site history
- Built: 12th century
- Built by: Dukes of Zähringen
- Battles/wars: Gümmenenkrieg (1332)

Landshut Castle is a castle in the municipality of Utzenstorf of the Canton of Bern in Switzerland. It is a Swiss heritage site of national significance.

== History ==
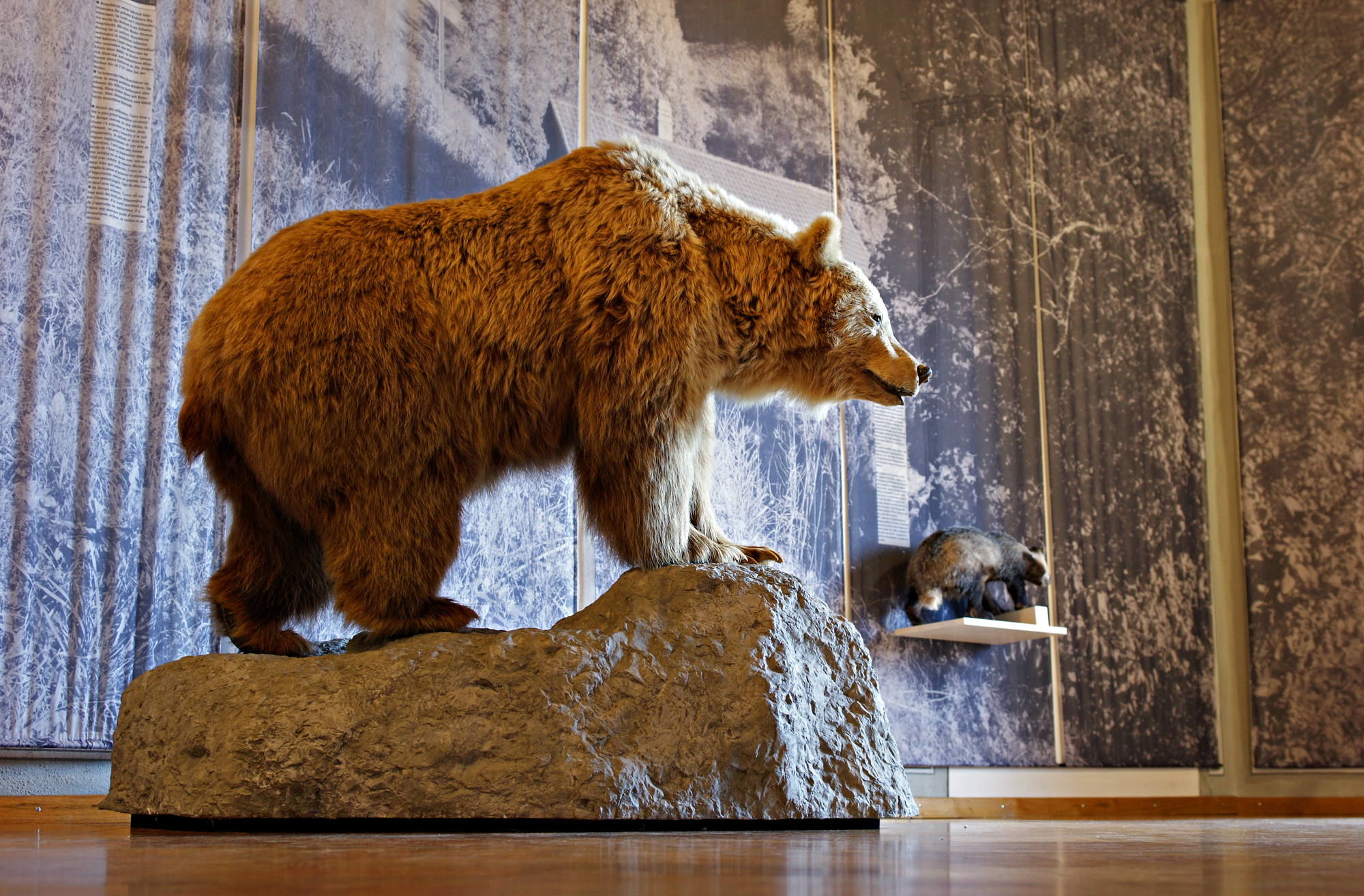
Stuffed bear in the museum

Under the Kingdom of Burgundy, the county of Uranestorfus was first mentioned in a record from 1009. The county stretched from the Seeland to the Oberaargau. While there may have been an earlier Burgundian castle, Landshut Castle was probably built in the second half of the 12th century for the Dukes of Zähringen. It was the seat of the Lords of Uzansdorf who ruled from 1175 until 1323. Under the Dukes, Landshut Castle was the administrative center of the Amt or township of Utzenstorf. When the Zähringen line died out, the Amt was inherited by the Counts of Kyburg.

Under the Counts of Kyburg, the castle was expanded and renovated in the 12th century. It was first called Landeshuothe in 1253. During the Gümmenenkrieg in 1332, the castle was attacked by troops from Bern and Solothurn and destroyed. It was rebuilt shortly thereafter. At the end of the 14th century, the Kyburgs were forced to pawn the castle and the Amt. It was acquired by Rudolf von Ringoltingen from Bern, who combined several estates into the Amt. In 1479, Ludwig von Diesbach inherited the estate from the Ringoltingen family. However, in 1514, the city of Bern bought the castle and Amt from the Diesbachs. Under Bernese rule, the castle became the center of the bailiwick of Landshut.

In 1624-30, the castle was rebuilt on the old foundations. In 1812, the city of Bern sold the castle and estates to Rudolf Niklaus von Wattenwyl. Over the next three years, it was rebuilt into a country estate. The Wattenwyl family held the castle until 1846, when it was sold to the Sinner family. Almost half a century later, the castle was sold again. It passed through several owners until 1925 when the Rütimeyer in Alexandria family bought the estate. They held it until 1958 when it was sold back to the Canton of Bern. In 1988, a foundation acquired the castle, redecorated it to match the style of the 17th century and converted part of it into a museum. Today it is the home of the Schweizer Museum für Wild und Jagd (Swiss museum of Wildlife and Hunting).

== See also ==
- List of castles in Switzerland
