= Susanna Kaiser-Luder =

Swiss teacher and memoirist (1842–1938)

- Born: September 16, 1842; Büren zum Hof, Canton of Bern, Switzerland
- Died: September 14, 1938 (aged 95); Berne, Switzerland
- Occupations: Teacher, home economics instructor, merchant's wife, memoirist
- Spouse: Wilhelm Kaiser

Susanna Kaiser-Luder (born Susanna Luder; 16 September 1842 – 14 September 1938) was a Swiss teacher, home economics instructor, and merchant's wife who lived for a decade in Arequipa, Peru. She is known for an autobiographical account written in 1914 describing her life in Peru between 1866 and 1876, which offers a female perspective on the conditions of a prosperous Swiss merchant family in nineteenth-century Latin America.

== Life ==
=== Early life and education ===
Susanna Luder was the youngest of eleven children of Johannes Luder, a farmer, brickyard owner, and court bailiff, and his wife Maria, née Schürch. After training at the Hindelbank teacher-training school (1858–1860), she worked for five years as a primary school teacher in Lyssach. There she became engaged to Wilhelm Kaiser, a commercial employee from Leuzigen, whom she had met at Hindelbank.

=== Years in Peru ===
Wilhelm Kaiser, well-trained but without means, left for Peru in 1862, where he found employment at the Swiss trading house Sand & Cía. in Lima. Against her family's wishes, Susanna Luder joined him in 1866. The couple married in Lima and settled in Arequipa, where Wilhelm had been managing the flourishing import-export firm Sprüngli & Kaiser since 1864, which imported textiles and quality goods from Switzerland and Europe via maritime trade. The Kaisers returned to Berne for the first time in 1872, partly to enroll their children in local schools, but were compelled to move back to Arequipa in 1873 following disputes with the Swiss directors of their firm.

=== Return to Switzerland ===
The family returned definitively to Switzerland in 1876, settling first in Solothurn and then in Berne from 1881, where Wilhelm Kaiser purchased a school bookshop and had a villa built in 1885. In 1889 the family was admitted to the Butchers' guild (Metzgernzunft). At the end of 1904, Wilhelm Kaiser inaugurated a residential and commercial building on the Marktgasse in Berne, designed by architect Eduard Joos, later known as the Kaiserhaus department store; the building was acquired by the Swiss National Bank in 1971. Susanna and Wilhelm Kaiser-Luder had six children, including Wilhelm Kaiser, founder of the Villars chocolate factory; Otto and Bruno Kaiser, who took over their father's business; and Bertha Kaiser, who married publisher Albert Benteli. Wilhelm Kaiser died in 1908, and the following year his widow made a substantial donation to the Swiss Association of Female Teachers.

=== Autobiographical account ===
In 1914 Susanna Kaiser-Luder wrote an autobiographical account of her daily life in Peru between 1866 and 1876, intended for her descendants. The text describes how she and her husband built their wealth through risk-taking, luck, and hard work, laying the foundation of the family's fortune for subsequent generations. Moving from a village in the Bernese Seeland to the wealthy economic elite of Arequipa, she encountered new ways of life, civil war, disease, and the violent earthquake of 1868. Her account also documents what was probably the first known attempt to plunder (not yet confirmed by high-altitude archaeology) the sacred precinct of the Chachani volcano in 1869.

Beyond describing her own daily activities, visits to the baths, and the refined life of the local elite, she also addressed the hardships faced by poorer Swiss emigrants: a Bernese gold-seeker and his family who fell into poverty, and a young woman from Schaffhausen expelled from her home municipality and forced to work in Peru in near-slave conditions. Her memoirs reflect the perspective of a Bernese Protestant on Arequipa's Catholic elite and the religious practices of the indigenous population; while they sometimes bear the marks of religious and (post)colonial prejudice, they are not characterised by racist condescension.

== Bibliography ==
- "Susanna Kaiser-Luder (obituary)". Der Bund. 19 January 1938.
- Betschart, Pius (2024). ""Arequipa wäre ohne die Erdbeben ein Paradies auf Erden". Susanna Kaiser-Luders "Erinnerungen" an ihr Leben in Peru (1866–1876)". Berner Zeitschrift für Geschichte. 86 (3): 3–63.
- Betschart, Pius (2025). Über Peru an die Berner Marktgasse. Die Kaufmannsfamilie Kaiser-Luder und das Kaiserhaus.
