= Albert Benteli =

Albert Benteli may refer to:

- Albert Benteli (professor) (1843–1917), Swiss mathematician and educator
- Albert Benteli (publisher) (1867–1944), Swiss publisher and printer, founder of Benteli Verlag
