= Villars =

Villars may refer to:

== Places ==
=== France ===
- Villars, Dordogne
- Villars, Eure-et-Loir
- Villars, Loire
- Villars, Vaucluse
- Villars-les-Dombes, Ain
- Villars-le-Sec, Territoire de Belfort

=== Switzerland ===
==== Canton of Jura ====
- Villars-sur-Fontenais, Fontenais

==== Canton of Fribourg ====
- Villars-d'Avry in Pont-en-Ogoz
- Villars-sous-Mont in Bas-Intyamon
- Villars-sur-Glâne
- Villars-sur-Marly, Pierrafortscha

==== Canton of Vaud ====
- Villars-sur-Ollon
- Villars Bozon, L'Isle
- Bougy-Villars
- Lussery-Villars
- Villars-Bramard
- Villars-Burquin
- Villars-Epeney
- Villars-le-Comte
- Villars-le-Grand
- Villars-le-Terroir
- Villars-Mendraz
- Villars-Sainte-Croix
- Villars-sous-Champvent
- Villars-sous-Yens
- Villars-Tiercelin

=== Others ===
- Villars, Buenos Aires, Argentina

== People ==
- Claude Louis Hector de Villars (1653–1734), Marshal of France
- Dominique Villars (1745–1814), French botanist
- Felix Villars (1921–2002), biophysicist

== Other uses ==
- Villars Maître Chocolatier, a Swiss chocolate company
