= Las Heras =

Las Heras usually refers to General Juan Gregorio de las Heras, a military leader in the South American Wars of Independence. There are several places in Argentina named after him:

- Las Heras, Mendoza, a town
- Las Heras Department, whose chief town is Las Heras, Mendoza
- General Las Heras, Buenos Aires, a town
- General Las Heras Partido, whose chief town is General Las Heras
- Las Heras (Buenos Aires Underground), a railway station
- Las Heras, Santa Cruz
