= Mötschwil =

- Former municipality
- Flag Coat of arms
- Location of Mötschwil
- Location within Switzerland Location within Canton of Bern
- Coordinates: 47°3′N 7°34′E
- Country: Switzerland
- Canton: Bern
- District: Emmental

Area
  - Total: 2.9 km^{2} (1.1 sq mi)
- Elevation: 530 m (1,740 ft)

Population (December 2019)
  - Total: 121
  - Density: 42/km^{2} (110/sq mi)
- Time zone: UTC+01:00 (CET)
  - Summer (DST): UTC+02:00 (CEST)
- Postal code: 3324
- SFOS number: 0416
- ISO 3166 code: CH-BE
- Surrounded by: Burgdorf, Hindelbank, Krauchthal, Lyssach, Oberburg, Rüti bei Lyssach
- Website: SFSO statistics

Mötschwil is a former municipality in the administrative district of Emmental in the canton of Bern in Switzerland. On 1 January 2021 the former municipality of Mötschwil merged into Hindelbank.

== History ==
Mötschwil was first mentioned in 1328 as Mötschwile. Until 1910 it was known as Mötschwil-Schleumen.

The oldest trace of a settlement in the area is a La Tène cemetery. Politically and judicially, the village of Mötschwil, Schleumen and Grüt were part of the village of Alchenflüh. However, they were part of the parish of Hindelbank and part of the military district of Zollikofen. In 1331 Fraubrunnen Abbey became one of the large land owners in the villages.

Starting in 1804, Mötschwil Lyssach and Rohrmoos (part of the Oberburg municipality) formed a school district. They built a school in the settlement of Kreuzweg in 1806. Despite being located close to the railroad stations of Hindelbank and Lyssach the municipality remained largely rural and agricultural.

== Geography ==
Mötschwil had an area of 2.95 km^{2} (1.14 sq mi). Of this area, 1.87 km^{2} (0.72 mi^{2}) or 63.4% is used for agricultural purposes, while 0.89 km^{2} (0.34 mi^{2}) or 30.2% is forested. Of the rest of the land, 0.16 km^{2} (0.062 mi^{2}) or 5.4% is settled (buildings or roads).

Of the built up area, housing and buildings made up 2.7% and transportation infrastructure made up 2.7%. Out of the forested land, all of the forested land area is covered with heavy forests. Of the agricultural land, 53.2% is used for growing crops and 8.8% is pastures, while 1.4% is used for orchards or vine crops.

It consists of the villages of Mötschwil and Schleumen and the hamlets of Kreuzweg.

On 31 December 2009 Amtsbezirk Burgdorf, the municipality's former district, was dissolved. On the following day, 1 January 2010, it joined the newly created Verwaltungskreis Emmental.

== Coat of arms ==
The blazon of the municipal coat of arms is Gules a Sickle Argent handled Or within a corn wreath of the same with five Cornflowers Azure.

== Demographics ==
Mötschwil had a population (as of 2019) of 121. As of 2010, 10.2% of the population are resident foreign nationals. Over the last 10 years (2000-2010) the population has changed at a rate of 12.2%. Migration accounted for 11.4%, while births and deaths accounted for 3.3%.

Most of the population (as of 2000) speaks German (111 or 99.1%) as their first language with the rest speaking English.

As of 2008, the population was 56.2% male and 43.8% female. The population was made up of 70 Swiss men (51.1% of the population) and 7 (5.1%) non-Swiss men. There were 53 Swiss women (38.7%) and 7 (5.1%) non-Swiss women. Of the population in the municipality, 38 or about 33.9% were born in Mötschwil and lived there in 2000. There were 60 or 53.6% who were born in the same canton, while 5 or 4.5% were born somewhere else in Switzerland, and 4 or 3.6% were born outside of Switzerland.

As of 2010, children and teenagers (0–19 years old) make up 21.9% of the population, while adults (20–64 years old) make up 59.9% and seniors (over 64 years old) make up 18.2%.

As of 2000, there were 47 people who were single and never married in the municipality. There were 52 married individuals, 6 widows or widowers and 7 individuals who are divorced.

As of 2000, there were 19 households that consist of only one person and 4 households with five or more people. In 2000, a total of 48 apartments (80.0% of the total) were permanently occupied, while 8 apartments (13.3%) were seasonally occupied and 4 apartments (6.7%) were empty.

The historical population is given in the following chart:

== Sights ==
The entire hamlet of Mötschwil is designated as part of the Inventory of Swiss Heritage Sites.

== Politics ==
In the 2011 federal election the most popular party was the Swiss People's Party (SVP) which received 48.9% of the vote. The next three most popular parties were the Social Democratic Party (SP) (10.5%), the Conservative Democratic Party (BDP) (9.3%) and the Green Party (7.6%). In the federal election, a total of 129 votes were cast, and the voter turnout was 53.3%.

== Economy ==
As of 2011, Mötschwil had an unemployment rate of 5.82%. As of 2008, there were a total of 40 people employed in the municipality. Of these, there were 24 people employed in the primary economic sector and about 9 businesses involved in this sector. 1 person was employed in the secondary sector and there was 1 business in this sector. 15 people were employed in the tertiary sector, with 6 businesses in this sector.

In 2008 there were a total of 27 full-time equivalent jobs. The number of jobs in the primary sector was 15, all of which were in agriculture. The number of jobs in the secondary sector was 1, in construction. The number of jobs in the tertiary sector was 11. In the tertiary sector; 7 or 63.6% were in a hotel or restaurant and 1 was in education.

In 2000, there were 6 workers who commuted into the municipality and 53 workers who commuted away. The municipality is a net exporter of workers, with about 8.8 workers leaving the municipality for every one entering. Of the working population, 4.1% used public transportation to get to work, and 67.1% used a private car.

== Religion ==
From the 2000 census, 5 or 4.5% were Roman Catholic, while 84 or 75.0% belonged to the Swiss Reformed Church. Of the rest of the population, there were 25 individuals (or about 22.32% of the population) who belonged to another Christian church. 10 (or about 8.93% of the population) belonged to no church, are agnostic or atheist.

== Education ==
In Mötschwil about 57 or (50.9%) of the population have completed non-mandatory upper secondary education, and 17 or (15.2%) have completed additional higher education (either university or a Fachhochschule). Of the 17 who completed tertiary schooling, 64.7% were Swiss men, 35.3% were Swiss women.

The Canton of Bern school system provides one year of non-obligatory Kindergarten, followed by six years of Primary school. This is followed by three years of obligatory lower Secondary school where the students are separated according to ability and aptitude. Following the lower Secondary students may attend additional schooling or they may enter an apprenticeship.

During the 2010-11 school year, there were a total of 21 students attending classes in Mötschwil, all in one primary school class.

As of 2000, there were 8 students from Mötschwil who attended schools outside the municipality.
