= Rüti bei Lyssach =

- Municipality
- Flag Coat of arms
- Location of Rüti bei Lyssach
- Location within Switzerland Location within Canton of Bern
- Coordinates: 47°03′N 7°35′E
- Country: Switzerland
- Canton: Bern
- District: Burgdorf (district)

Government
  - Executive: Gemeinderat with 5 members
  - Mayor: Gemeindepräsident(in); Stefan Hofer (as of 2026)

Area
  - Total: 1.3 km^{2} (0.50 sq mi)
- Elevation: 523 m (1,716 ft)

Population (December 2020)
  - Total: 172
  - Density: 130/km^{2} (340/sq mi)
- Time zone: UTC+01:00 (CET)
  - Summer (DST): UTC+02:00 (CEST)
- Postal code: 3421
- SFOS number: 422
- ISO 3166 code: CH-BE
- Surrounded by: Burgdorf, Lyssach, Mötschwil, Oberburg
- Website: https://ruetibeilyssach.jimdofree.com/

Rüti bei Lyssach is a municipality in the administrative district of Emmental in the canton of Bern in Switzerland.

== History ==
Rüti bei Lyssach is first mentioned in 1341 as Ruiti. The name comes from the Old High German word riod meaning clearing. In the Middle Ages, the village belonged to the Count of Kyburg. In 1406, Bern gained control of it.

The village church was first mentioned in 1275. After the Protestant Reformation the village church became part of a parish in Burgdorf, but was also a filial church of the church in Kirchberg. During the Early Modern Period, it belonged to the low court of Alchenflüh but paid taxes and belonged to the military district of Burgdorf. After the 1798 French invasion, Lyssach and Rüti merged into a single municipality. Five years later, under the Act of Mediation, they divided again and Rüti became independent.

Starting in the 1960s the population grew as amelioration opened up new farming land and a freight warehousing business provided new jobs. The Binsberg neighborhood was built to house new arrivals. Farming became less important in the local economy and by 2000 almost three-quarters of the working population commuted to Bern or Burgdorf for work.

== Geography ==
Rüti bei Lyssach is located at 532 meters (1,745 ft) above sea level, 4 kilometers (2.5 mi) as the crow flies west of the district capital Burgdorf. Rüti bei Lyssach has an area of 1.29 km^{2} (0.50 sq mi). Of this area, 1.09 km^{2} (0.42 mi^{2}) or 84.5% is used for agricultural purposes, while 0.15 km^{2} (0.058 mi^{2}) or 11.6% is forested. Of the rest of the land, 0.08 km^{2} (20 acres) or 6.2% is settled (buildings or roads).

Of the built up area, housing and buildings made up 3.9% and transportation infrastructure made up 2.3%. Out of the forested land, all of the forested land area is covered with heavy forests. Of the agricultural land, 70.5% is used for growing crops and 11.6% is pastures, while 2.3% is used for orchards or vine crops.

The small agricultural village is situated in a copse on the southern edge of the floodplain of the Emme on the base of the molasse of the Swiss Plateau.

The area includes a cragged portion of the plateau. Most of it consists of the dell of Rüti, which is drained by a creek into the Emme. The dell is surrounded by several mountains Räbberg and Binzberg in the north, Büelhölzli in the west, and Schneiteberg in the south. The highest point in Rüti bei Lyssach is located on the northern slope of Schneiteberg with 590 meters (1,940 ft) above sea level. To the east the territory of the municipality reaches to the embankment of the Rohrmishubel.

Rüti bei Lyssach is neighbored by Lyssach, Burgdorf, Oberburg and Mötschwil.

On 31 December 2009 Amtsbezirk Burgdorf, the municipality's former district, was dissolved. On the following day, 1 January 2010, it joined the newly created Verwaltungskreis Emmental.

== Coat of arms ==
The blazon of the municipal coat of arms is Per pale Sable and Argent a Palm Leaf Vert.

== Demographics ==
Rüti bei Lyssach has a population (as of December 2020) of 172. As of 2010, 1.2% of the population are resident foreign nationals. Over the last 10 years (2000–2010) the population has changed at a rate of 4.3%. Migration accounted for 8.7%, while births and deaths accounted for 0.6%.

Most of the population (as of 2000) speaks German (152 or 97.4%) as their first language. French and Spanish both have one native speaker.

As of 2008, the population was 47.9% male and 52.1% female. The population was made up of 79 Swiss men (47.3% of the population) and 1 (0.6%) non-Swiss men. There were 86 Swiss women (51.5%) and 1 (0.6%) non-Swiss women. Of the population in the municipality, 54 or about 34.6% were born in Rüti bei Lyssach and lived there in 2000. There were 78 or 50.0% who were born in the same canton, while 17 or 10.9% were born somewhere else in Switzerland, and 5 or 3.2% were born outside of Switzerland.

As of 2010, children and teenagers (0–19 years old) make up 19.8% of the population, while adults (20–64 years old) make up 65.3% and seniors (over 64 years old) make up 15%.

As of 2000, there were 59 people who were single and never married in the municipality. There were 86 married individuals, 6 widows or widowers and 5 individuals who are divorced.

As of 2000, there were 12 households that consist of only one person and 6 households with five or more people. In 2000, a total of 57 apartments (83.8% of the total) were permanently occupied, while 10 apartments (14.7%) were seasonally occupied and one apartment was empty. As of 2010, the construction rate of new housing units was 6 new units per 1000 residents.

The historical population is given in the following chart:

== Politics ==
In the 2011 federal election the most popular party was the Federal Democratic Union of Switzerland (EDU) which received 6% of the vote. The next three most popular parties were the Liberal Party of Switzerland (LPS) (0%), the Liberal Party of Switzerland (LPS) (0%) and the Liberal Party of Switzerland (LPS) (0%).

== Economy ==
In the second half of the 19th century, agriculture was the most important economic sector. Today, tillage, pomiculture, and stock-breeding are still very important for the population of the village. Besides the primary sector, there are very few jobs in Rüti bei Lyssach. Many inhabitants commute to Burgdorf.

As of 2011, Rüti bei Lyssach had an unemployment rate of 2.01%. As of 2008, there were a total of 29 people employed in the municipality. Of these, there were 27 people employed in the primary economic sector and about 8 businesses involved in this sector. No one was employed in the secondary sector. 2 people were employed in the tertiary sector, with 2 businesses in this sector.

In 2008 there were a total of 18 full-time equivalent jobs. The number of jobs in the primary sector was 16, all of which were in agriculture. The remaining 2 were in the tertiary sector of which 1 was in the trade, sale or the repair of motor vehicles.

In 2000, there were 66 workers who commuted away from the municipality. Of the working population, 17.6% used public transportation to get to work, and 41.8% used a private car.

== Religion ==
From the 2000 census, 12 or 7.7% were Roman Catholic, while 136 or 87.2% belonged to the Swiss Reformed Church. Of the rest of the population, there was 1 member of an Orthodox church. 3 (or about 1.92% of the population) belonged to no church, are agnostic or atheist, and 4 individuals (or about 2.56% of the population) did not answer the question.

== Education ==
In Rüti bei Lyssach about 66 or (42.3%) of the population have completed non-mandatory upper secondary education, and 24 or (15.4%) have completed additional higher education (either university or a Fachhochschule). Of the 24 who completed tertiary schooling, 83.3% were Swiss men, 16.7% were Swiss women.

During the 2010–11 school year, there were no students attending school in Rüti bei Lyssach.

As of 2000, there were 21 students from Rüti bei Lyssach who attended schools outside the municipality.

== Transportation ==
Rüti bei Lyssach is situated just 500 meters away from the old road from Bern via Hindelbank to Burgdorf. The nearest connection to the A1, which goes from Bern to Zürich, is about 3 kilometers away from the center of the village. A bus line of the Regionalverkehr Mittelland AG connects Rüti bei Lyssach to Bolligen and Burgdorf.
