= Plomer, Buenos Aires =

Plomer
- Town
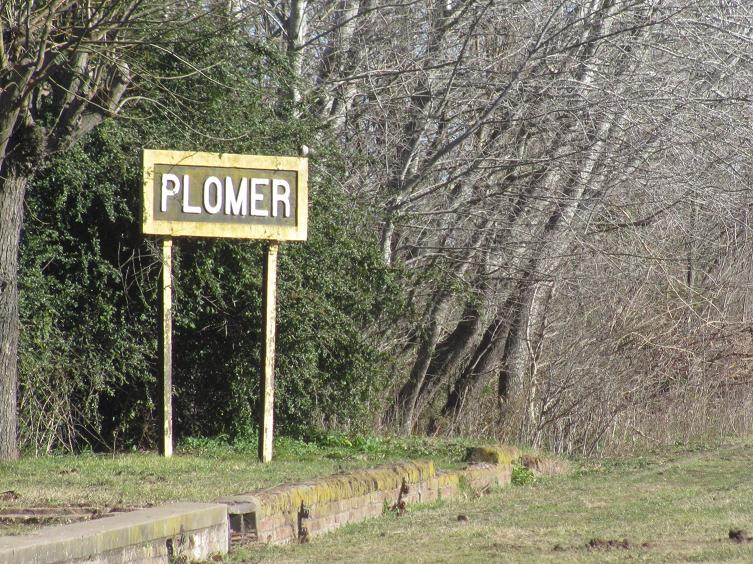

- Location within Buenos Aires Province
- Coordinates: 34°47′40″S 59°01′54″W
- Country: Argentina
- Province: Buenos Aires
- Partidos: General Las Heras
- Established: 1908
- Elevation: 18 m (59 ft)

Population (2001 Census)
  - Total: 144
- Time zone: UTC−3 (ART)
- CPA Base: B 1733
- Climate: Dfc

Plomer is a town located in the General Las Heras Partido in the province of Buenos Aires, Argentina. The town is located along Provincial Route 6.

== Geography ==
Plomer is located 92 km (57 mi) from the city of Buenos Aires, and 128 km (80 mi) from the provincial capital of La Plata.

== History ==
Plomer was founded in 1908 upon the inauguration of a railway station the same year, which connected the town to the city of Rosario. The station was constructed and operated by the Compañía General de Ferrocarriles. The town was named after Pedro Plomer Huguet, who was the grandfather of the town's founder. Plomer initially saw rapid growth and the construction of multiple warehouses and hotels.

Rail service to Plomer was later served by the Belgrano Railway. Passenger rail service ended in 1977, and all forms of service to the station ended in the 1990s. The station today is a museum.

== Economy ==
Since the end of rail service, the town's economy has been primarily centered on rural tourism.

== Population ==
According to INDEC, which collects population data for the country, the town had a population of 144 people as of the 2001 census.
