= Lyssach =

Municipality in Bern, Switzerland

- Municipality
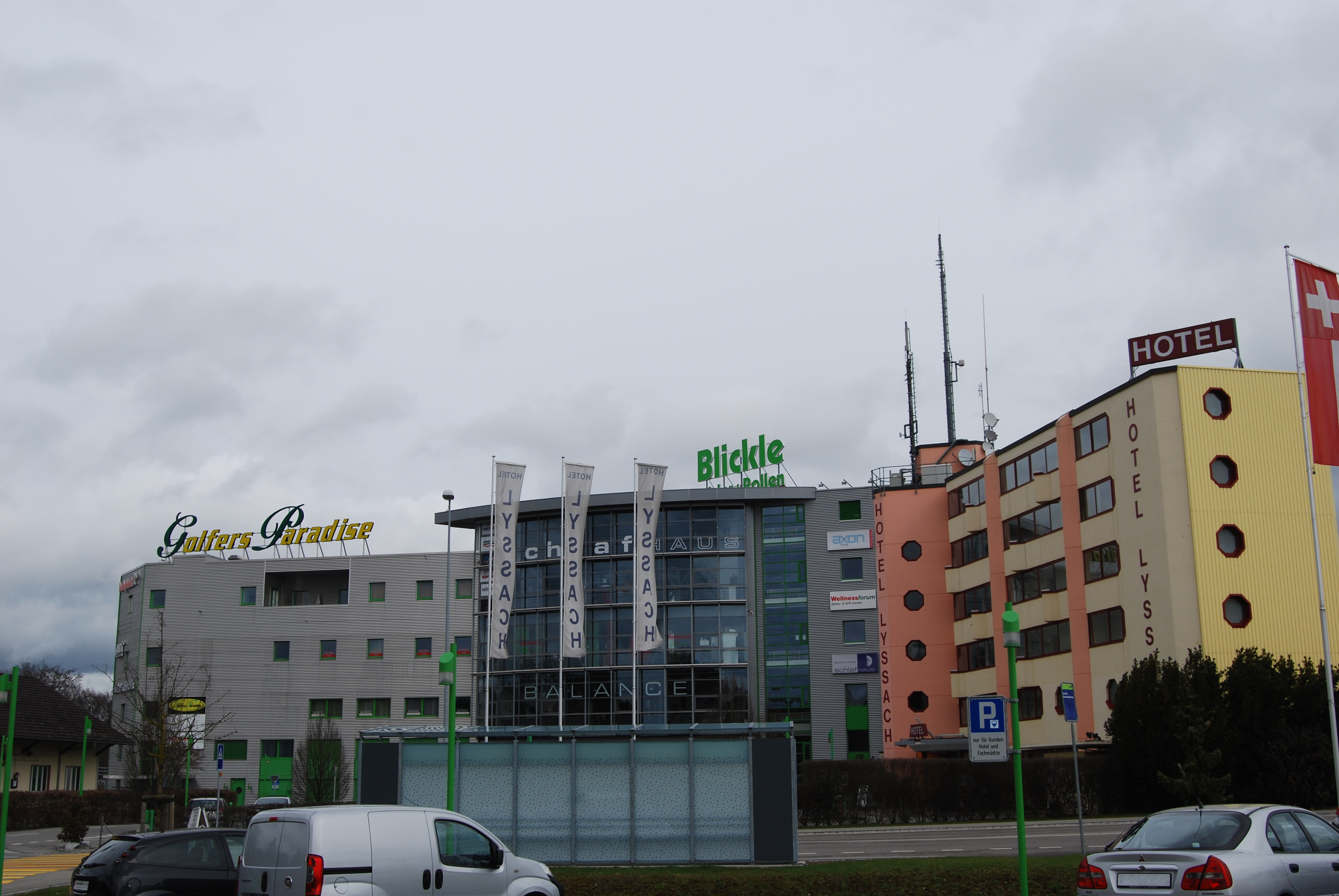
- Hotel Lyssach in Lyssach village

- Flag Coat of arms
- Location of Lyssach
- Location within Switzerland Location within Canton of Bern
- Coordinates: 47°4′N 7°35′E
- Country: Switzerland
- Canton: Bern
- District: Emmental

Government
  - Executive: Gemeinderat with 7 members
  - Mayor: Gemeindepräsident(in); Kilian Thomann SVP/UDC (as of 2026)

Area
  - Total: 6.1 km^{2} (2.4 sq mi)
- Elevation: 516 m (1,693 ft)

Population (December 2020)
  - Total: 1,466
  - Density: 240/km^{2} (620/sq mi)
- Time zone: UTC+01:00 (CET)
  - Summer (DST): UTC+02:00 (CEST)
- Postal code: 3421
- SFOS number: 415
- ISO 3166 code: CH-BE
- Surrounded by: Burgdorf, Fraubrunnen, Hindelbank, Kernenried, Kirchberg, Mötschwil, Rüdtligen-Alchenflüh, Rüti bei Lyssach
- Website: www.lyssach.ch

Lyssach (Swiss Standard German pronunciation: [ˈliːsax]) is a municipality in the administrative district of Emmental in the canton of Bern in Switzerland.

== History ==
Lyssach is first mentioned in 894 as Lihsacho and as Lissacho in 1255.

The oldest trace of a settlement is Hallstatt grave mounds in the Birchiwald. The village is first mentioned in a donation document from 894 where a noble lady, Pirin, donated land in the village to the Abbey of St. Gall. While the Abbey was a major landholder in the village, politically, religiously and socially it was part of the village of Alchenflüh. Between the 13th and 15th centuries, the Kyburgs and various monasteries acquired land in the village. In 1429 and 1481 Bern bought out many of the land holders. Following Bern's acceptance of the Protestant Reformation in 1528, the remaining ecclesiastical properties were taken by Bern when the monasteries were secularized.

Beginning in the 17th century, Lyssach, Aefligen, Rüdtligen and Ruti formed a school cooperative which built a schoolhouse in Rüdtligen. In 1775, Lyssach built their own schoolhouse, that they shared with Ruti until 1804. During the 18th century, the chaussee or highway from Bern to Zurich passed through the village. In 1857 a station and railroad further connected the village with the rest of the country. The population and economy expanded rapidly after 1965 when the A1 motorway was built near the village. New housing developments, schools, sewers and a commercial zone were all built to handle the growing population. Lyssach has grown into a regional business and economic center.

== Geography ==
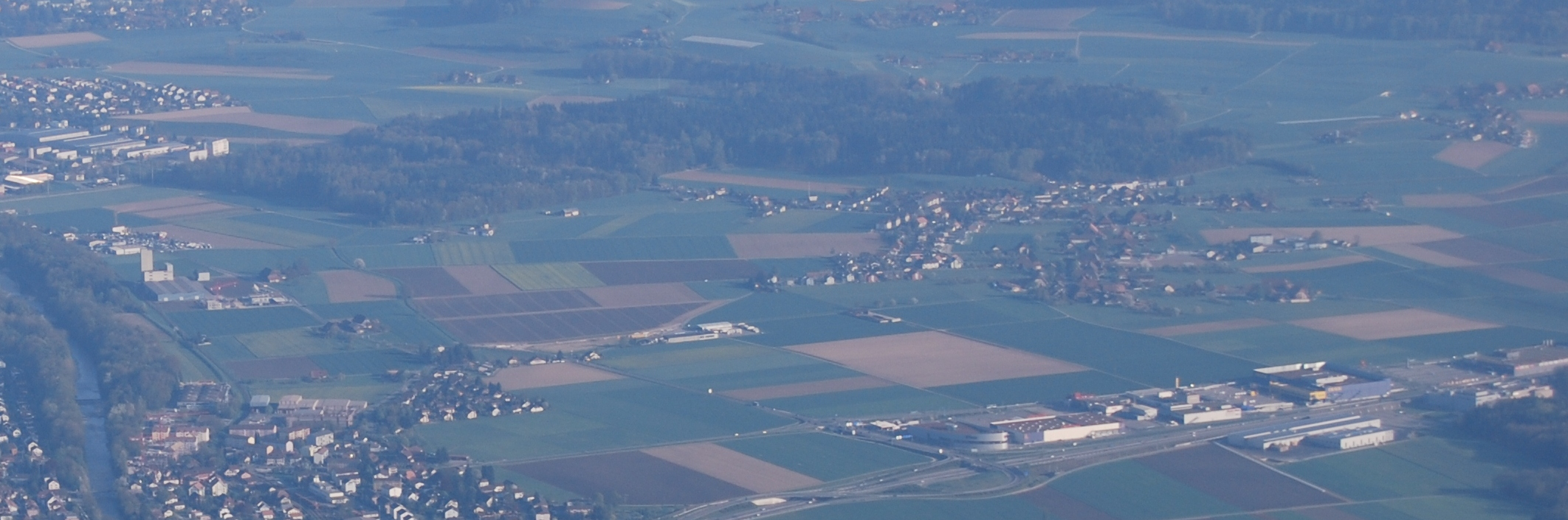
Aerial view of Lyssach with the industrial park in the foreground.

Lyssach has an area of 6.05 km^{2} (2.34 sq mi). Of this area, 3.21 km^{2} (1.24 mi^{2}) or 53.0% is used for agricultural purposes, while 1.9 km^{2} (0.73 mi^{2}) or 31.4% is forested. Of the rest of the land, 0.89 km^{2} (0.34 mi^{2}) or 14.7% is settled (buildings or roads), 0.06 km^{2} (15 acres) or 1.0% is either rivers or lakes.

Of the built up area, industrial buildings made up 3.0% of the total area while housing and buildings made up 5.3% and transportation infrastructure made up 5.8%. Out of the forested land, all of the forested land area is covered with heavy forests. Of the agricultural land, 40.8% is used for growing crops and 11.2% is pastures. All the water in the municipality is flowing water.

The municipality is near the Emme river. It consists of the village of Lyssach, the neighborhood of Schachen on the banks of the Emme, scattered farm houses and a large commercial development.

On 31 December 2009 Amtsbezirk Burgdorf, the municipality's former district, was dissolved. On the following day, 1 January 2010, it joined the newly created Verwaltungskreis Emmental.

== Coat of arms ==
The blazon of the municipal coat of arms is Sable two Fleurs-de-Lis Argent.

== Demographics ==
Lyssach has a population (as of December 2020) of 1,466. As of 2010, 5.5% of the population are resident foreign nationals. Over the last 10 years (2000-2010) the population has changed at a rate of 6.6%. Migration accounted for 9.6%, while births and deaths accounted for 2.5%.

Most of the population (as of 2000) speaks German (1,308 or 94.0%) as their first language, Italian is the second most common (13 or 0.9%) and Turkish is the third (9 or 0.6%). There are 5 people who speak French.

As of 2008, the population was 50.4% male and 49.6% female. The population was made up of 680 Swiss men (46.9% of the population) and 50 (3.5%) non-Swiss men. There were 689 Swiss women (47.6%) and 30 (2.1%) non-Swiss women. Of the population in the municipality, 429 or about 30.8% were born in Lyssach and lived there in 2000. There were 612 or 44.0% who were born in the same canton, while 183 or 13.2% were born somewhere else in Switzerland, and 115 or 8.3% were born outside of Switzerland.

As of 2010, children and teenagers (0–19 years old) make up 18.1% of the population, while adults (20–64 years old) make up 66% and seniors (over 64 years old) make up 15.9%.

As of 2000, there were 595 people who were single and never married in the municipality. There were 678 married individuals, 59 widows or widowers and 59 individuals who are divorced.

As of 2000, there were 170 households that consist of only one person and 42 households with five or more people. In 2000, a total of 545 apartments (92.5% of the total) were permanently occupied, while 20 apartments (3.4%) were seasonally occupied and 24 apartments (4.1%) were empty. As of 2010, the construction rate of new housing units was 5.5 new units per 1000 residents. The vacancy rate for the municipality, in 2011, was 1.91%.

The historical population is given in the following chart:

== Sights ==
The entire village of Lyssach is designated as part of the Inventory of Swiss Heritage Sites.

== Politics ==
In the 2011 federal election the most popular party was the Swiss People's Party (SVP) which received 41% of the vote. The next three most popular parties were the Conservative Democratic Party (BDP) (17.7%), the Social Democratic Party (SP) (15.4%) and the FDP.The Liberals (6%). In the federal election, a total of 583 votes were cast, and the voter turnout was 51.1%.

== Economy ==
As of 2011, Lyssach had an unemployment rate of 1.86%. As of 2008, there were a total of 1,358 people employed in the municipality. Of these, there were 42 people employed in the primary economic sector and about 14 businesses involved in this sector. 194 people were employed in the secondary sector and there were 20 businesses in this sector. 1,122 people were employed in the tertiary sector, with 79 businesses in this sector.

In 2008 there were a total of 1,123 full-time equivalent jobs. The number of jobs in the primary sector was 30, all of which were in agriculture. The number of jobs in the secondary sector was 183 of which 157 or (85.8%) were in manufacturing and 14 (7.7%) were in construction. The number of jobs in the tertiary sector was 910. In the tertiary sector; 795 or 87.4% were in wholesale or retail sales or the repair of motor vehicles, 24 or 2.6% were in a hotel or restaurant, 11 or 1.2% were in education and 2 or 0.2% were in health care.

In 2000, there were 901 workers who commuted into the municipality and 569 workers who commuted away. The municipality is a net importer of workers, with about 1.6 workers entering the municipality for every one leaving. Of the working population, 19.7% used public transportation to get to work, and 50.5% used a private car.

== Religion ==
From the 2000 census, 141 or 10.1% were Roman Catholic, while 1,049 or 75.4% belonged to the Swiss Reformed Church. Of the rest of the population, there was 1 member of an Orthodox church, there was 1 individual who belongs to the Christian Catholic Church, and there were 69 individuals (or about 4.96% of the population) who belonged to another Christian church. There were 2 individuals (or about 0.14% of the population) who were Jewish, and 30 (or about 2.16% of the population) who were Islamic. There were 2 individuals who were Buddhist, 20 individuals who were Hindu and 2 individuals who belonged to another church. 73 (or about 5.25% of the population) belonged to no church, are agnostic or atheist, and 35 individuals (or about 2.52% of the population) did not answer the question.

== Education ==
In Lyssach about 600 or (43.1%) of the population have completed non-mandatory upper secondary education, and 145 or (10.4%) have completed additional higher education (either university or a Fachhochschule). Of the 145 who completed tertiary schooling, 80.0% were Swiss men, 15.2% were Swiss women.

The Canton of Bern school system provides one year of non-obligatory Kindergarten, followed by six years of Primary school. This is followed by three years of obligatory lower Secondary school where the students are separated according to ability and aptitude. Following the lower Secondary students may attend additional schooling or they may enter an apprenticeship.

During the 2010-11 school year, there were a total of 116 students attending classes in Lyssach. There were 2 kindergarten classes with a total of 22 students in the municipality. Of the kindergarten students, and 4.5% have a different mother language than the classroom language. The municipality had 4 primary classes and 76 students. Of the primary students, 3.9% were permanent or temporary residents of Switzerland (not citizens) and 2.6% have a different mother language than the classroom language. During the same year, there was one lower secondary class with a total of 18 students. There were 5.6% who were permanent or temporary residents of Switzerland (not citizens) and 5.6% have a different mother language than the classroom language.

As of 2000, there were 22 students in Lyssach who came from another municipality, while 61 residents attended schools outside the municipality.

Lyssach is home to the Schul- und Gemeindebibliothek Lyssach (municipal library of Lyssach). The library has (as of 2008) 6,475 books or other media, and loaned out items in the same year. It was open a total of 187 days with average of 5 hours per week during that year.

== Transportation ==
The municipality has a railway station, Lyssach, on the Olten–Bern line. It has regular service to Bern, Thun, Langnau i.E., Solothurn, and Sumiswald-Grünen.
