= Wilhelm Kaiser =

Swiss chocolate manufacturer

- Born: July 14, 1872; Bern, Switzerland
- Died: April 9, 1939 (aged 66); Fribourg, Switzerland
- Occupations: Businessman, chocolate manufacturer

Wilhelm Kaiser (14 July 1872 – 9 April 1939) was a Swiss businessman and chocolate manufacturer, best known for founding what became Villars SA, a chocolate company based in Fribourg.

== Life and career ==
Kaiser was born on 14 July 1872 in Bern, the son of Wilhelm Kaiser, a merchant, and Susanne Luder. He was the brother of Bruno Kaiser. He married Rita Collin, and was the brother-in-law of Albert Benteli. He received his schooling and commercial training in Bern, followed by professional placements within the family business and later in England and Germany.

In 1901, Kaiser founded a chocolate factory on the Pérolles plateau in Fribourg, which became Villars SA in 1904. The company faced a difficult start, unable to compete with established firms already dominant in the Swiss chocolate market. In 1911, Kaiser left the chocolatiers' cartel to build his own distribution network. This move represented a significant shift in Swiss commerce: as a pioneer of direct sales, he was a forerunner of Gottlieb Duttweiler.

In 1938, Kaiser was awarded an honorary doctorate by the University of Fribourg. He died on 9 April 1939 in Fribourg.

== Bibliography ==
- S. Jordan, Chocolats Villars SA (1901–1954), 2001
