= Pestalozzi-Kalender =

Swiss student pocket almanac, published from 1907

- Editor: Bruno Kaiser; Anna Autor; Werner Kuhn; Konrad Richter; Martin von Aesch
- Frequency: Annual
- Publisher: Pro Juventute (1943–2001); Zürcher Atlantis-Verlag (2002–2010); Stämpfli (2016–2017); Weber Verlag AG (2018–present)
- Founded: 1907
- First issue: 1908
- Country: Switzerland
- Based in: Bern; Thun
- Language: German, French, Italian

The Pestalozzi-Kalender (also known as the Almanach Pestalozzi in French) is a Swiss student pocket almanac first published in 1907 for the year 1908 by the Bernese merchant Bruno Kaiser, under the title Kaiser's neuer Schweizer Schülerkalender. It became known colloquially as the Pestalozzi-Kalender from its second year of publication, a subtitle derived from the cover of the first edition, which depicted the monument to Johann Heinrich Pestalozzi in Yverdon.

== Background and origins ==
Kaiser's commercial product was not directly related to older and popular Pestalozzi almanacs and children's almanacs previously published in Zurich (1834–1841) and Dresden (1846–1893). Through its wealth of images and texts suited to its audience, the involvement of real or fictitious young editors, and audience participation, the school almanac belonged to the tradition of subjects and imaginary characters typical of popular almanacs such as the Simplicissimuskalender, the Hinkender Bote, and the Rheinländischer Hausfreund.

== Content and influence ==
The almanac had a notable influence on the education of young people: it offered direct practical help for daily school life through printed timetables, collections of mathematical formulas, and conjugation tables, while also encouraging reading through interesting experiments, practical maxims, and brief biographical notices on well-known figures. Its annual print run at times exceeded 110,000 copies, enabling it to reach its target audience and be regarded as the Swiss almanac for young people.

Through the Pestalozzi donation, free copies were funded and, accompanied by a message from the Federal Council, offered to Swiss children living abroad. Since 1994, the almanac has begun in August, in line with the school year.

== Editions and languages ==
A French-language edition appeared from 1910 to 1968, and an Italian edition from 1918 to 1972, followed by editions in other countries. Separate editions for boys and girls were produced in German (from 1913), Italian (from 1931), and French (1924–1951 and 1954–1962). From 1913, the German edition was accompanied by a separate textual supplement (Schatzkästlein).

== Staff ==
In addition to Bruno Kaiser, editorial responsibility was held by Anna Autor (from 1919), followed by Werner Kuhn, Konrad Richter, and Martin von Aesch. Illustration was handled by Wilhelm Balmer, Ernst Linck, Paul Boesch, Beni Laroche, and Anna Luchs.

== Publishing history ==
From 1943 to 2001, the almanac was published by the Pro Juventute foundation, and from 2002 to 2010 by Zürcher Atlantis-Verlag (part of the Orell Füssli publishing group). In 2008, to mark the centenary, the University of Bern library presented an exhibition; its curator, Charles Linsmayer, published the almanac from 2011 to 2015 under the title Pestalozzi-Agenda, then in 2016–2017 under various names with Stämpfli in Bern, and from 2018 with Werd & Weber, now Weber Verlag AG, in Thun.

== Bibliography ==
=== Archival holdings ===
- Zentralbibliothek Zürich, Zurich, Alte Drucke, Kal 1957.

=== Secondary literature ===
- Arndt, Otto; Gerhardt, Oswald: Verzeichnis der pädagogischen Zeitschriften, Jahrbücher und Lehrerkalender Deutschlands, 1893.
- Chazai, Louis: Bruno Kaiser e l'Almanacco Pestalozzi, 1936.
- Benz, Bruno: «Pestalozzi-Kalender», in: Historischer Kalender, oder, Der hinkende Bot, 285, 2012, pp. 121–123.
