= Oberburg, Bern =

Oberburg
- Municipality
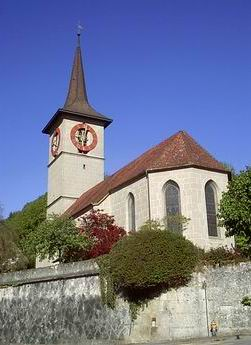
- Oberburg village church

- Flag Coat of arms
- Location of Oberburg
- Location within Switzerland Location within Canton of Bern
- Coordinates: 47°2′N 7°38′E
- Country: Switzerland
- Canton: Bern
- District: Emmental

Government
  - Executive: Gemeinderat with 7 members
  - Mayor: Gemeindepräsident(in); Werner Kobel SVP/UDC (as of 2026)

Area
  - Total: 14.1 km^{2} (5.4 sq mi)
- Elevation: 547 m (1,795 ft)

Population (December 2020)
  - Total: 2,937
  - Density: 208/km^{2} (539/sq mi)
- Time zone: UTC+01:00 (CET)
  - Summer (DST): UTC+02:00 (CEST)
- Postal code: 3414
- SFOS number: 418
- ISO 3166 code: CH-BE
- Surrounded by: Burgdorf, Hasle bei Burgdorf, Krauchthal, Lützelflüh, Mötschwil, Rüti bei Lyssach, Vechigen
- Website: www.oberburg.ch

Oberburg is a municipality in the administrative district of Emmental in the canton of Bern in Switzerland.

== History ==
Oberburg is first mentioned in 1240 as Obrunburc.

The oldest evidence of a settlement in the area are some Roman era coins which were found at Pfaugarten. Other traces of settlements include a fortification at Bachholen, a pass road from the Aare valley into the Emme valley and earthworks at Waldbrueder. While these three sides predate surviving records, their exact age is unknown. The village took its name from the upper castle (German: Oberburg) which stood on the Rothöchi. The castle probably got its name to distinguish it from the lower castle at Burgdorf. The castle was probably the seat of a ministerialis (unfree knights in the service of a feudal overlord) family in the service of the Counts of Kyburg. The ministerialis family might have been the Lords of Oberburg who were mentioned in the 13th century or the Lords of Rohrmoos, a family that existed from 1241 until 1402. By the 14th century, the village was directly owned by the Kyburgs. During the Burgdorf war of 1383–84, Bern captured the village from the Kyburgs and in 1408 integrated it into the Bernese district court of Ranflüh. By 1431, it was treated as an associated village of the town of Burgdorf and in 1525 Bern placed the village under the authority of the mayor of Burgdorf. In 1803 it became part of the district of Burgdorf.

The village church of Saint George was first mentioned in 1242. The current nave was built in 1497, while the choir dates from 1510. After Bern accepted the Protestant Reformation in 1528, the benefice right passed to the city of Bern. Originally, the church was a parish church over a large parish that included Burgdorf, Heimiswil and parts of Hasle. The town church of Burgdorf was originally a filial church of Oberburg, but in 1401 it broke away to form its own parish. During the Middle Ages, the hamlet of Tschamerii had the Chapel of St. Mary, but the building was later demolished and no trace remains.

For much of its history, the hills above Oberburg were filled with isolated small farms, while the village was surrounded with large farms practicing three field crop rotation. The village had common land along the Emme river which was shared with Burgdorf and Hasle. Beginning in the 16th century, this shared common land became a constant source of conflict. Oberburg quarreled with Hasle in 1534-35 and again in 1545, but the majority of conflicts were with Burgdorf. Burgdorf attempted to annex the fields in 1520–21, again in 1546 and once again in 1608. They tried to turn it into forests in 1635 and over exploited it in 1619. The three communities continued to quarrel until 1700-04 when all three finally agreed on a scheme to divide the land between them.

The main road through the Emmental passed through Oberburg and brought businesses and industry to the village. It was home to a hammer mill in the 17th century, wire mills in 1672 and 1761, a scythe factory in 1771 and a fulling factory in 1787. During the 17th and 18th centuries, Burgdorf made it very difficult for non-citizens of the town to settle or open businesses, so many entrepreneurs settled in Oberburg instead. In response, Burgdorf attempted to suppress businesses and industry in Oberburg. In 1698 they tried to close the hammer mill and in 1736 and 1752 they prohibited a butcher's shop and a general store, respectively, from opening. However, in the 19th century a number of new factories opened, including weaving factories, foundries, a paint factory, a machine factory, a furniture factory and a brickyard. In 1881, the Emmental Railway opened a station between Oberburg and Burgdorf which further encouraged development. By the 21st century it was a mostly commercial and industrial village surrounded by small hamlets and individual farms which remained primarily agricultural. Starting in the 1960s many residents commuted to jobs in Burgdorf or Bern.

The village has three school buildings and it forms a school district with parts of Mötschwil and Lützelflüh. The secondary school opened in 1913. In 1985 the Obernburg workshop for the handicapped opened in the municipality.

== Geography ==
Aerial view by Walter Mittelholzer (1922)

Oberburg has an area of 14.14 km^{2} (5.46 sq mi). Of this area, 7.88 km^{2} (3.04 mi^{2}) or 55.8% is used for agricultural purposes, while 4.7 km^{2} (1.8 mi^{2}) or 33.3% is forested. Of the rest of the land, 1.49 km^{2} (0.58 mi^{2}) or 10.6% is settled (buildings or roads), 0.06 km^{2} (15 acres) or 0.4% is either rivers or lakes and 0.02 km^{2} (4.9 acres) or 0.1% is unproductive land.

Of the built up area, housing and buildings made up 4.7% and transportation infrastructure made up 2.8%. while parks, green belts and sports fields made up 2.1%. Out of the forested land, 32.2% of the total land area is heavily forested and 1.1% is covered with orchards or small clusters of trees. Of the agricultural land, 19.8% is used for growing crops and 34.3% is pastures, while 1.7% is used for orchards or vine crops. All the water in the municipality is flowing water.

The village stretches along the left bank of the Emme River (except for Schachen- and Uferanteil) in the Luterbachgraben (Luter creek valley) in includes the villages of Oberburg, Weiler, several individual farms and the exclaves of Rohrmoos and Tannen.

On 31 December 2009 Amtsbezirk Burgdorf, the municipality's former district, was dissolved. On the following day, 1 January 2010, it joined the newly created Verwaltungskreis Emmental.

== Coat of arms ==
The blazon of the municipal coat of arms is Sable a Castle Argent with a tower embattled, a tower roofed Gules and two Houses roofed Gules on a Mount of 3 Coupeaux vert. The castle (German: Burg) over or above (German: ober) the mountain makes this an example of canting arms.

== Demographics ==
Oberburg has a population (as of December 2020) of 2,937. As of 2010, 15.3% of the population are resident foreign nationals. Over the last 10 years (2000-2010) the population has changed at a rate of 3.3%. Migration accounted for 1.9%, while births and deaths accounted for 2.1%.

Most of the population (as of 2000) speaks German (2,459 or 89.7%) as their first language, Serbo-Croatian is the second most common (82 or 3.0%) and Italian is the third (57 or 2.1%). There are 12 people who speak French and 1 person who speaks Romansh.

As of 2008, the population was 48.7% male and 51.3% female. The population was made up of 1,176 Swiss men (40.8% of the population) and 226 (7.8%) non-Swiss men. There were 1,264 Swiss women (43.9%) and 215 (7.5%) non-Swiss women. Of the population in the municipality, 842 or about 30.7% were born in Oberburg and lived there in 2000. There were 1,170 or 42.7% who were born in the same canton, while 259 or 9.5% were born somewhere else in Switzerland, and 373 or 13.6% were born outside of Switzerland.

As of 2010, children and teenagers (0–19 years old) make up 21.5% of the population, while adults (20–64 years old) make up 62.1% and seniors (over 64 years old) make up 16.4%.

As of 2000, there were 1,134 people who were single and never married in the municipality. There were 1,326 married individuals, 173 widows or widowers and 107 individuals who are divorced.

As of 2000, there were 322 households that consist of only one person and 91 households with five or more people. In 2000, a total of 1,079 apartments (89.4% of the total) were permanently occupied, while 71 apartments (5.9%) were seasonally occupied and 57 apartments (4.7%) were empty. As of 2010, the construction rate of new housing units was 7.6 new units per 1000 residents. The vacancy rate for the municipality, in 2011, was 2.39%.

The historical population is given in the following chart:

== Heritage sites of national significance ==
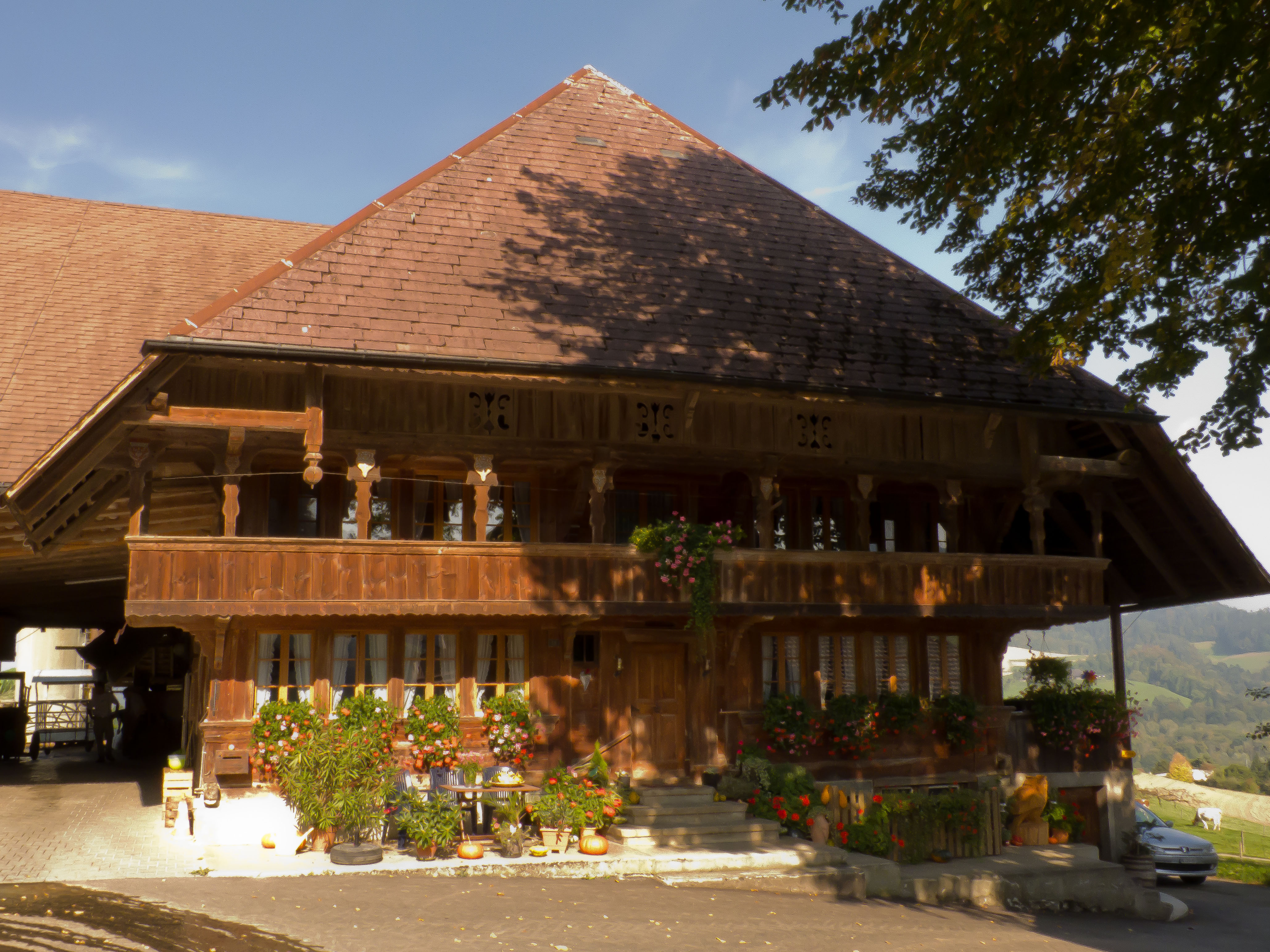
Staldenhof in Oberburg

The Staldenhof house at Untere Oschwandstrasse 38 is listed as a Swiss heritage site of national significance. The hamlets of Brittenwald and Rohrmoos are part of the Inventory of Swiss Heritage Sites.

== Politics ==
In the 2011 federal election the most popular party was the Swiss People's Party (SVP) which received 41.1% of the vote. The next three most popular parties were the Conservative Democratic Party (BDP) (16.2%), the Social Democratic Party (SP) (15.3%) and the Green Party (5.4%). In the federal election, a total of 943 votes were cast, and the voter turnout was 46.3%.

== Economy ==
As of 2011, Oberburg had an unemployment rate of 3.37%. As of 2008, there were a total of 1,218 people employed in the municipality. Of these, there were 148 people employed in the primary economic sector and about 54 businesses involved in this sector. 465 people were employed in the secondary sector and there were 34 businesses in this sector. 605 people were employed in the tertiary sector, with 72 businesses in this sector.

In 2008 there were a total of 993 full-time equivalent jobs. The number of jobs in the primary sector was 103, all of which were in agriculture. The number of jobs in the secondary sector was 438 of which 304 or (69.4%) were in manufacturing and 126 (28.8%) were in construction. The number of jobs in the tertiary sector was 452. In the tertiary sector; 103 or 22.8% were in wholesale or retail sales or the repair of motor vehicles, 38 or 8.4% were in the movement and storage of goods, 25 or 5.5% were in a hotel or restaurant, 13 or 2.9% were technical professionals or scientists, 35 or 7.7% were in education and 176 or 38.9% were in health care.

In 2000, there were 836 workers who commuted into the municipality and 1,038 workers who commuted away. The municipality is a net exporter of workers, with about 1.2 workers leaving the municipality for every one entering. Of the working population, 12.7% used public transportation to get to work, and 48.4% used a private car.

== Religion ==
From the 2000 census, 219 or 8.0% were Roman Catholic, while 1,915 or 69.9% belonged to the Swiss Reformed Church. Of the rest of the population, there were 112 members of an Orthodox church (or about 4.09% of the population), and there were 211 individuals (or about 7.70% of the population) who belonged to another Christian church. There were 125 (or about 4.56% of the population) who were Islamic. There was 1 person who was Buddhist, 22 individuals who were Hindu and 2 individuals who belonged to another church. 132 (or about 4.82% of the population) belonged to no church, are agnostic or atheist, and 104 individuals (or about 3.80% of the population) did not answer the question.

== Education ==
In Oberburg about 1,048 or (38.2%) of the population have completed non-mandatory upper secondary education, and 267 or (9.7%) have completed additional higher education (either university or a Fachhochschule). Of the 267 who completed tertiary schooling, 71.5% were Swiss men, 21.7% were Swiss women, 5.2% were non-Swiss men.

The Canton of Bern school system provides one year of non-obligatory Kindergarten, followed by six years of Primary school. This is followed by three years of obligatory lower Secondary school where the students are separated according to ability and aptitude. Following the lower Secondary students may attend additional schooling or they may enter an apprenticeship.

During the 2010–11 school year, there were a total of 330 students attending classes in Oberburg. There were 3 kindergarten classes with a total of 54 students in the municipality. Of the kindergarten students, 18.5% were permanent or temporary residents of Switzerland (not citizens) and 29.6% have a different mother language than the classroom language. The municipality had 9 primary classes and 174 students. Of the primary students, 20.7% were permanent or temporary residents of Switzerland (not citizens) and 27.6% have a different mother language than the classroom language. During the same year, there were 6 lower secondary classes with a total of 102 students. There were 21.6% who were permanent or temporary residents of Switzerland (not citizens) and 28.4% have a different mother language than the classroom language.

As of 2000, there were 11 students in Oberburg who came from another municipality, while 49 residents attended schools outside the municipality.
