= Albert Benteli (professor) =

Swiss mathematician and educator (1843–1917)

- Born: Emanuel Albrecht Benteli; 24 April 1843; Schwarzenegg, Canton of Bern, Switzerland
- Died: 10 November 1917 (aged 74); Bern, Switzerland
- Education: ETH Zurich (civil engineering, 1860–1863)
- Occupations: Mathematician, educator
- Employer: University of Bern
- Spouse: Anna Maria Elisabeth Weichard (m. 1866)

Albert Benteli (born Emanuel Albrecht Benteli; 24 April 1843, Schwarzenegg – 10 November 1917, Bern) was a Swiss mathematician and educator, known for his work in descriptive and practical geometry, hydrometry, and meteorology.

== Life ==
Benteli was the son of Gottlieb Abraham Benteli, pastor of Schwarzenegg, and Maria Julia Lauterburg. In 1866 he married Anna Maria Elisabeth Weichard, from Oldenburg, Germany. He attended the Realschule in Bern and studied civil engineering at ETH Zurich from 1860 to 1863. His son was the publisher Albert Benteli.

== Career ==
In 1865, Benteli worked as an employee at the Federal Hydrometry Office in Bern. From 1869 he taught descriptive geometry at the cantonal school. At the municipal gymnasium in Bern, he was rector of the Realschule and commercial school from 1889 to 1914. In this role he promoted the teaching of descriptive geometry and technical drawing.

At the University of Bern, he was appointed Privatdozent in practical and descriptive geometry in 1874 and extraordinary professor in 1902. The university awarded him an honorary doctorate in 1909.

== Work ==
In addition to contributions in hydrometry and meteorology, Benteli published articles on applications of central collineation and on perspective.

== Bibliography ==
- H. Flükiger, "Prof. Dr. Albert Benteli", in Mitteilungen der Naturforschenden Gesellschaft in Bern, 1919, pp. 221–227 (with list of works)
- Neue Deutsche Biographie, vol. 2, p. 55
