= Bruno Kaiser (publisher) =

Swiss publisher and merchant (1877–1941)

- Born: September 27, 1877; Solothurn, Switzerland
- Died: November 30, 1941 (aged 64); Bern, Switzerland
- Occupations: Publisher, merchant

Bruno Kaiser (27 September 1877 – 30 November 1941) was a Swiss merchant and publisher, best known as the founder and editor of the Pestalozzi-Kalender, an influential annual publication for young people that he created in 1907 and edited until his death. He was also a co-founder of the department store Kaiser & Co. AG.

== Life and career ==
Kaiser was born on 27 September 1877 in Solothurn. He was the son of Wilhelm Kaiser, a merchant, and Susanne née Luder. He remained unmarried throughout his life. After attending school and completing commercial training in Bern, he joined the family stationery business. Together with his father and his brother Wilhelm Kaiser, he founded around 1900 the department store Kaiser & Co. AG. In 1903–1904 he had the Kaiserhaus built on the Marktgasse in Bern.

In 1907, Kaiser created the Pestalozzi-Kalender for the year 1908. He edited this annual youth publication himself until his death, publishing it through his own company (Pestalozzi-Verlag). The almanac was widely read and influential, reaching a print run of 100,000 copies in 1916. A French-language edition appeared from 1910 and an Italian edition from 1918.

Beyond his business activities, Kaiser was involved in charitable and public-interest work, notably as a member of the Foundation for the Promotion of Scientific Research and of the Winter Relief (Winterhilfe). He was also a central figure in a large social circle of artists and scientists. The University of Bern awarded him an honorary doctorate in 1927.

Kaiser died on 30 November 1941 in Bern.

== Bibliography ==
- "Drei Berner Geschäftshäuser. Erbaut von Architekt Ed. Joos in Bern", in: Schweizerische Bauzeitung, 54/2, 1909, pp. 15–17.
- Chazai, Louis: Bruno Kaiser e l'Almanacco Pestalozzi, 1936.
- Der Bund, 1 and 4 December 1941.
