= Aefligen =

- Municipality
- Flag Coat of arms
- Location of Aefligen
- Location within Switzerland Location within Canton of Bern
- Coordinates: 47°6′N 7°33′E
- Country: Switzerland
- Canton: Bern
- District: Emmental

Government
  - Executive: Gemeinderat with 7 members
  - Mayor: Gemeindepräsident(in); Peter Hofer (as of 2026)

Area
  - Total: 2.04 km^{2} (0.79 sq mi)
- Elevation: 497 m (1,631 ft)

Population (December 2020)
  - Total: 1,103
  - Density: 541/km^{2} (1,400/sq mi)
- Time zone: UTC+01:00 (CET)
  - Summer (DST): UTC+02:00 (CEST)
- Postal code: 3426
- SFOS number: 401
- ISO 3166 code: CH-BE
- Surrounded by: Bätterkinden, Fraubrunnen, Kirchberg, Rüdtligen-Alchenflüh, Utzenstorf
- Website: www.aefligen.ch

Aefligen is a municipality in the Emmental administrative district in the canton of Bern in Switzerland.

== History ==
The first mention of the town is in 1261 when it was known as Efflingen. During the 13th Century, the nearby Fraubrunnen Abbey became independent of the local nobility and brought Aefligen with them. By 1297 the neighboring villages were administered from Aefligen. However, it was far from fully independent. The Low justice court (petty crimes and punishments) for Aefligen was in Bätterkinden, it belonged to the county of Landshut and was part of the parish of Kirchberg. Around 1510-14 Landshut lost the rights to Aefligen and it became a vogtie of Bern.

Starting in the 14th century, conflicts began between Aefligen and neighboring villages and the Abbey over shared fields and woods. It was not until 1847 that Aefligen acquired its own woods, when the Rüdtligerwald became part of the community. In 1856 part of Moos joined Aefligen.

In 1838 the first bridge over the Emme River was completed which increased traffic through the community. In 1875 a railroad station of the Burgdorf-Solothurn-Bahn was built in Aefligen. Despite the construction of a fabric factory (1866–1920), foundry (1945) and a precision machining factory (1954) the community economy remained based on farming throughout the 20th Century.

== Geography ==
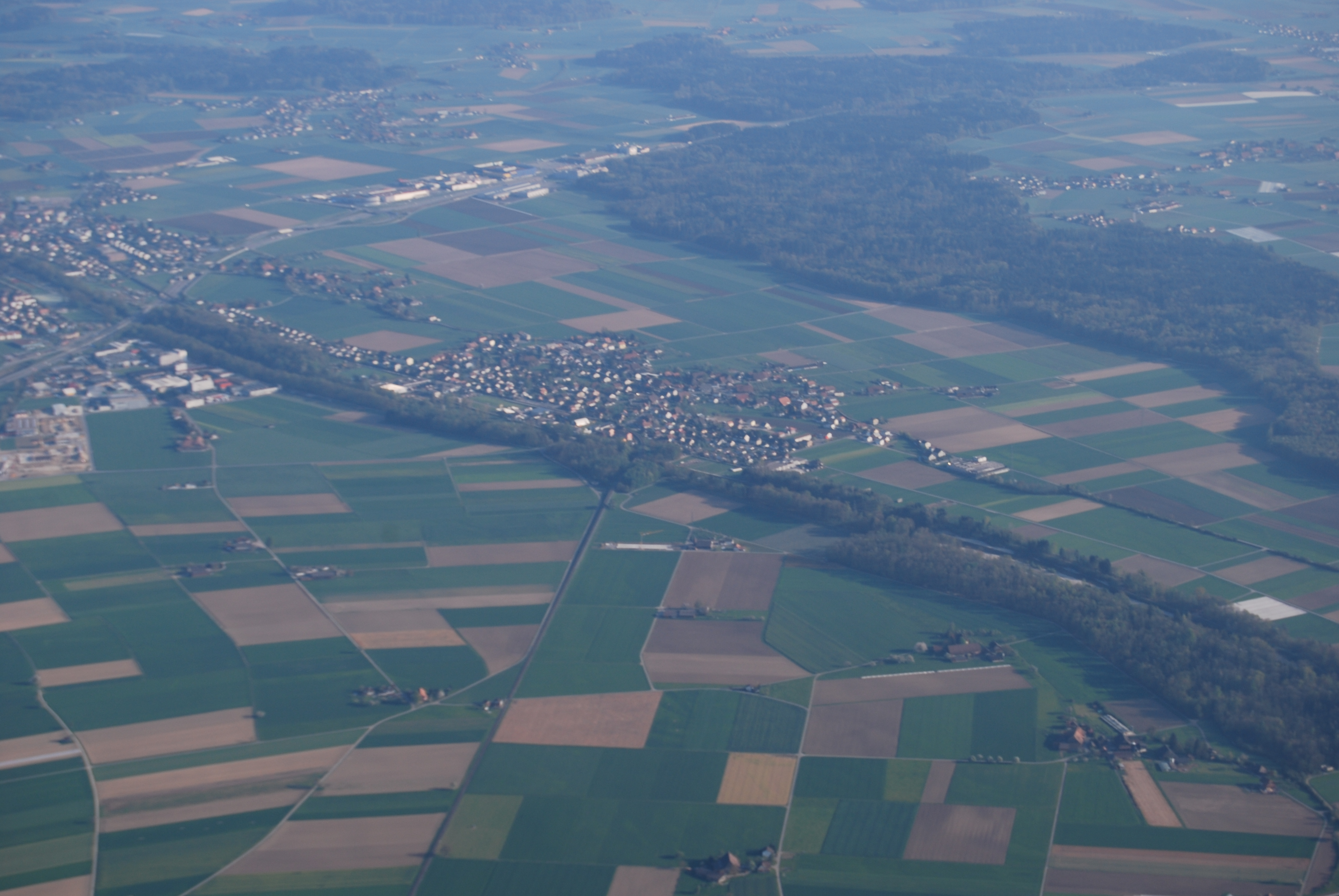
Aefligen from the air

Aerial view by Walter Mittelholzer (1933)

Aefligen has an area of 2.04 km^{2} (0.79 sq mi). Of this area, 1.42 km^{2} (0.55 mi^{2}) or 70.0% is used for agricultural purposes, while 0.07 km^{2} (0.027 mi^{2}) or 3.4% is forested. Of the rest of the land, 0.46 km^{2} (0.18 mi^{2}) or 22.7% is settled (buildings or roads), 0.09 km^{2} (22 acres) or 4.4% is either rivers or lakes and 0.01 km^{2} (2.5 acres) or 0.5% is unproductive land.

Of the built up area, industrial buildings made up 1.5% of the total area while housing and buildings made up 14.3% and transportation infrastructure made up 3.4%. Power and water infrastructure as well as other special developed areas made up 2.5% of the area Out of the forested land, all of the forested land area is covered with heavy forests. Of the agricultural land, 57.1% is used for growing crops and 11.3% is pastures, while 1.5% is used for orchards or vine crops. All the water in the municipality is flowing water.

The municipality is located on the Emme river. It consists of the village of Aefligen which is made up of the neighborhoods of Schachen, Ischlag and Neuhof.

On 31 December 2009 Amtsbezirk Burgdorf, the municipality's former district, was dissolved. On the following day, 1 January 2010, it joined the newly created Verwaltungskreis Emmental.

== Coat of arms ==
The blazon of the municipal coat of arms is Or three Escutcheons Azure.

== Demographics ==
Aefligen has a population (as of December 2020) of 1,103. As of 2010, 4.9% of the population are resident foreign nationals. Over the last 10 years (2000-2010) the population has changed at a rate of -1.6%. Migration accounted for 0.2%, while births and deaths accounted for -1.4%.

Most of the population (as of 2000) speaks German (974 or 96.1%) as their first language, Turkish is the second most common (7 or 0.7%) and Serbo-Croatian is the third (6 or 0.6%). There are 5 people who speak French, 4 people who speak Italian and 1 person who speaks Romansh.

As of 2008, the population was 49.8% male and 50.2% female. The population was made up of 474 Swiss men (47.2% of the population) and 26 (2.6%) non-Swiss men. There were 482 Swiss women (48.0%) and 23 (2.3%) non-Swiss women. Of the population in the municipality, 280 or about 27.6% were born in Aefligen and lived there in 2000. There were 494 or 48.7% who were born in the same canton, while 139 or 13.7% were born somewhere else in Switzerland, and 74 or 7.3% were born outside of Switzerland.

As of 2010, children and teenagers (0–19 years old) make up 18.1% of the population, while adults (20–64 years old) make up 66.3% and seniors (over 64 years old) make up 15.6%.

As of 2000, there were 418 people who were single and never married in the municipality. There were 492 married individuals, 47 widows or widowers and 57 individuals who are divorced.

As of 2000, there were 120 households that consist of only one person and 33 households with five or more people. In 2000, a total of 412 apartments (92.0% of the total) were permanently occupied, while 11 apartments (2.5%) were seasonally occupied and 25 apartments (5.6%) were empty. As of 2010, the construction rate of new housing units was 3 new units per 1000 residents. The vacancy rate for the municipality, in 2011, was 1.8%.

The historical population is given in the following chart:

== Politics ==
In the 2011 federal election the most popular party was the SVP which received 42.1% of the vote. The next three most popular parties were the SPS (18.3%), the BDP Party (14.7%) and the GLP Party (5.8%). In the federal election, a total of 387 votes were cast, and the voter turnout was 46.6%.

== Economy ==
As of 2011, Aefligen had an unemployment rate of 1.96%. As of 2008, there were a total of 230 people employed in the municipality. Of these, there were 38 people employed in the primary economic sector and about 17 businesses involved in this sector. 109 people were employed in the secondary sector and there were 13 businesses in this sector. 83 people were employed in the tertiary sector, with 27 businesses in this sector.

In 2008 there were a total of 188 full-time equivalent jobs. The number of jobs in the primary sector was 23, all of which were in agriculture. The number of jobs in the secondary sector was 100 of which 83 were in manufacturing and 15 were in construction. The number of jobs in the tertiary sector was 65. In the tertiary sector; 35 or 53.8% were in wholesale or retail sales or the repair of motor vehicles, 3 or 4.6% were in the movement and storage of goods, 4 or 6.2% were in a hotel or restaurant, 3 or 4.6% were technical professionals or scientists, 7 or 10.8% were in education.

In 2000, there were 170 workers who commuted into the municipality and 457 workers who commuted away. The municipality is a net exporter of workers, with about 2.7 workers leaving the municipality for every one entering. Of the working population, 18.7% used public transportation to get to work, and 58.2% used a private car.

== Religion ==
From the 2000 census, 94 or 9.3% were Roman Catholic, while 806 or 79.5% belonged to the Swiss Reformed Church. Of the rest of the population, there were 2 members of an Orthodox church (or about 0.20% of the population), and there were 28 individuals (or about 2.76% of the population) who belonged to another Christian church. There were 23 (or about 2.27% of the population) who were Islamic. There were 6 individuals who were Buddhist and 5 individuals who were Hindu. 37 (or about 3.65% of the population) belonged to no church, are agnostic or atheist, and 27 individuals (or about 2.66% of the population) did not answer the question.

== Education ==
In Aefligen about 431 or (42.5%) of the population have completed non-mandatory upper secondary education, and 82 or (8.1%) have completed additional higher education (either university or a Fachhochschule). Of the 82 who completed tertiary schooling, 73.2% were Swiss men, 22.0% were Swiss women.

The Canton of Bern school system provides one year of non-obligatory Kindergarten, followed by six years of Primary school. This is followed by three years of obligatory lower Secondary school where the students are separated according to ability and aptitude. Following the lower Secondary students may attend additional schooling or they may enter an apprenticeship.

During the 2009-10 school year, there were a total of 76 students attending classes in Aefligen. There was one kindergarten class with a total of 15 students in the municipality. Of the kindergarten students, and 13.3% have a different mother language than the classroom language. The municipality had 3 primary classes and 45 students. Of the primary students, 6.7% were permanent or temporary residents of Switzerland (not citizens) and 15.6% have a different mother language than the classroom language. During the same year, there was one lower secondary class with a total of 16 students. There were 6.3% who were permanent or temporary residents of Switzerland (not citizens) and 18.8% have a different mother language than the classroom language.

As of 2000, there were 47 students from Aefligen who attended schools outside the municipality.
