= General Las Heras, Buenos Aires =

General Las Heras
- Town
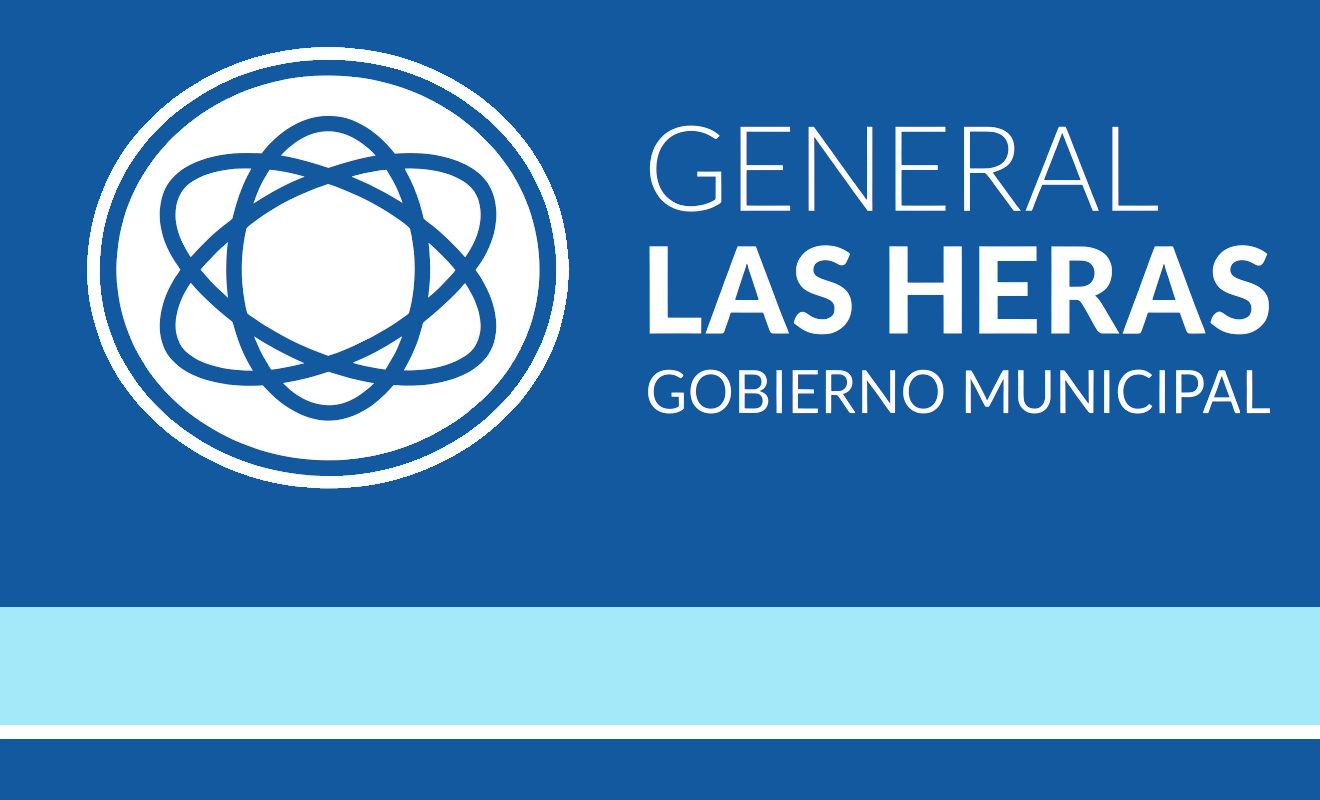
- Flag

- Location in Argentina Location in Buenos Aires Province
- Coordinates: 34°56′S 58°57′W
- Country: Argentina
- Province: Buenos Aires
- Partido: General Las Heras
- Elevation: 30 m (98 ft)

Population (2001 census [INDEC])
  - Total: 12,799
- CPA Base: B 1741
- Area code: +54 220

General Las Heras is a town and a municipality in the north east of the province of Buenos Aires, Argentina, 67 km from Buenos Aires City and 120 km from the provincial capital La Plata, on Provincial Route 200. It has a population of about 13,000 as per the 2001 census [INDEC]. It is the head town of the General Las Heras Partido

The city carries the name of Juan Gregorio de Las Heras, hero of the Argentine War of Independence and governor of Buenos Aires. The municipality was officially founded in 1864; the area was populated mainly by immigrants (Spanish, Italian, British, French and German). The formation of the city itself started later, on lands donated by Paulino Speratti for the construction of a church, a square, a school, the seat of the municipal authorities and the office of the peace judge.

== History ==
General Las Heras born as game October 25, 1864, with the main Spanish settlers, Italian, English, French and German. Created the same jurisdictional boundaries were established by decree in February 1875 and they are the parties of the Slaughter, Morón, Villa de Lujan, Navarro, Lobos and Cañuelas.

The Railway Line Sarmiento starts its operation in the branch comprising stations Merlo and Lobos, leaving Las Heras within the course and it remains a fact of high importance for the growth of General Las Heras. With this event, the auction of land around the railway station allows quickly develops a population stable and significant notoriety.

At that time Mr. Paulino Speratti through his wife Casilda Villamayor, donates land for construction of the church, a square, a school, the seat of the municipal authorities and the Magistrates Court.

The first authority of General Las Heras, Ramón Dumont was the judge appointed by decree in February 1864 and that for reasons of better control and with the authorization of the Minister of Government of the Province of Buenos Aires, the party divided the land into six barracks by a mayor headquarters. This system expires with the creation of the law of September 11, 1884, where the judicial functions of the administrative and political performed the Justices of the Peace are separated, initiating stage of municipal mayors and occupying the first position Don Juan Zamudio person nicknamed "the father of the poor" and that anyone who approached his stay was well received and helped generously.

Don Juan Zamudio also solved the problems between villagers and his word was heard as a final judgment.

In 1905, a local is constructed with two pieces for the office of municipal authorities. Over the years it sought to expand the municipal building for comfort, because in those two pieces on duty the mayor, justice of the peace, police and Deliberante. Terminadas Council works in 1906 the building met the essential comforts of the time so that authorities could perform their tasks with ease. Years later, again the municipal building requires a series of arrangements that would demand a large sum of money thus deciding to demolish the building and reconstruction at a lower cost, culminating works in 1958 this being the current building .
