= General Las Heras Partido =

General Las Heras Partido de General Las Heras
- Department
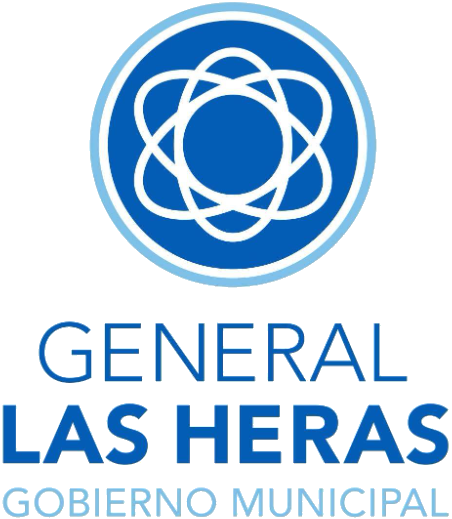

- location of General Las Heras in Buenos Aires Province
- Coordinates: 36°39′S 57°47′W
- Country: Argentina
- Established: October 25, 1864
- Founder: provincial law
- Seat: General Las Heras

Government
  - Intendant: Javier Osuna (UP)

Area
  - Total: 76 km^{2} (29 sq mi)

Population
  - Total: 12,799
  - Density: 170/km^{2} (440/sq mi)
- Demonym: herense
- Postal Code: B1741
- IFAM: BUE049
- Area Code: 0220
- Website: gobiernodelasheras.com

General Las Heras Partido is a small partido in the northeast of Buenos Aires Province in Argentina.

The provincial subdivision has a population of about 13,000 inhabitants in an area of 76 km^{2} (29 sq mi), and its capital city is General Las Heras, which is 67 km (42 mi) from Buenos Aires.

The partido and its main town are named after Juan Gregorio de las Heras, a hero of the Argentine War of Independence and governor of Buenos Aires.

== Towns ==
- General Las Heras, Buenos Aires (district capital)
- Enrique Flynn
- General Hornos
- La Choza
- Lozano
- Plomer
- Villars
