= Villars, Buenos Aires =

Villars
- Town
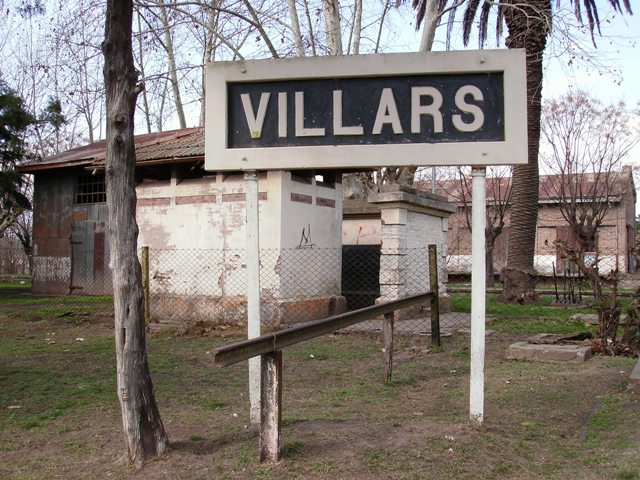

- Location within Buenos Aires Province
- Coordinates: 34°49′41″S 58°56′28″W
- Country: Argentina
- Province: Buenos Aires
- Partidos: General Las Heras
- Elevation: 25 m (82 ft)

Population (2001 Census)
  - Total: 892
- Time zone: UTC−3 (ART)
- CPA Base: B 1731
- Climate: Dfc

Villars is a town located in the General Las Heras Partido in the province of Buenos Aires, Argentina.

== Geography ==
Villars is located 98 km (61 mi) from the city of Buenos Aires.

== History ==
The town was served by rail, until the 1990s, when service ended, before resuming again in 2022. In the same year, bus service connecting the town with nearby communities was also completed. In 2023, a $670 million project to improve water coverage in the town was announced, which would lead to 90% of the town gaining access to drinking water.

== Population ==
According to INDEC, which collects population data for the country, the town had a population of 892 people as of the 2001 census.
