= Villars Maître Chocolatier =

Swiss chocolate company

Villars Maître Chocolatier SA
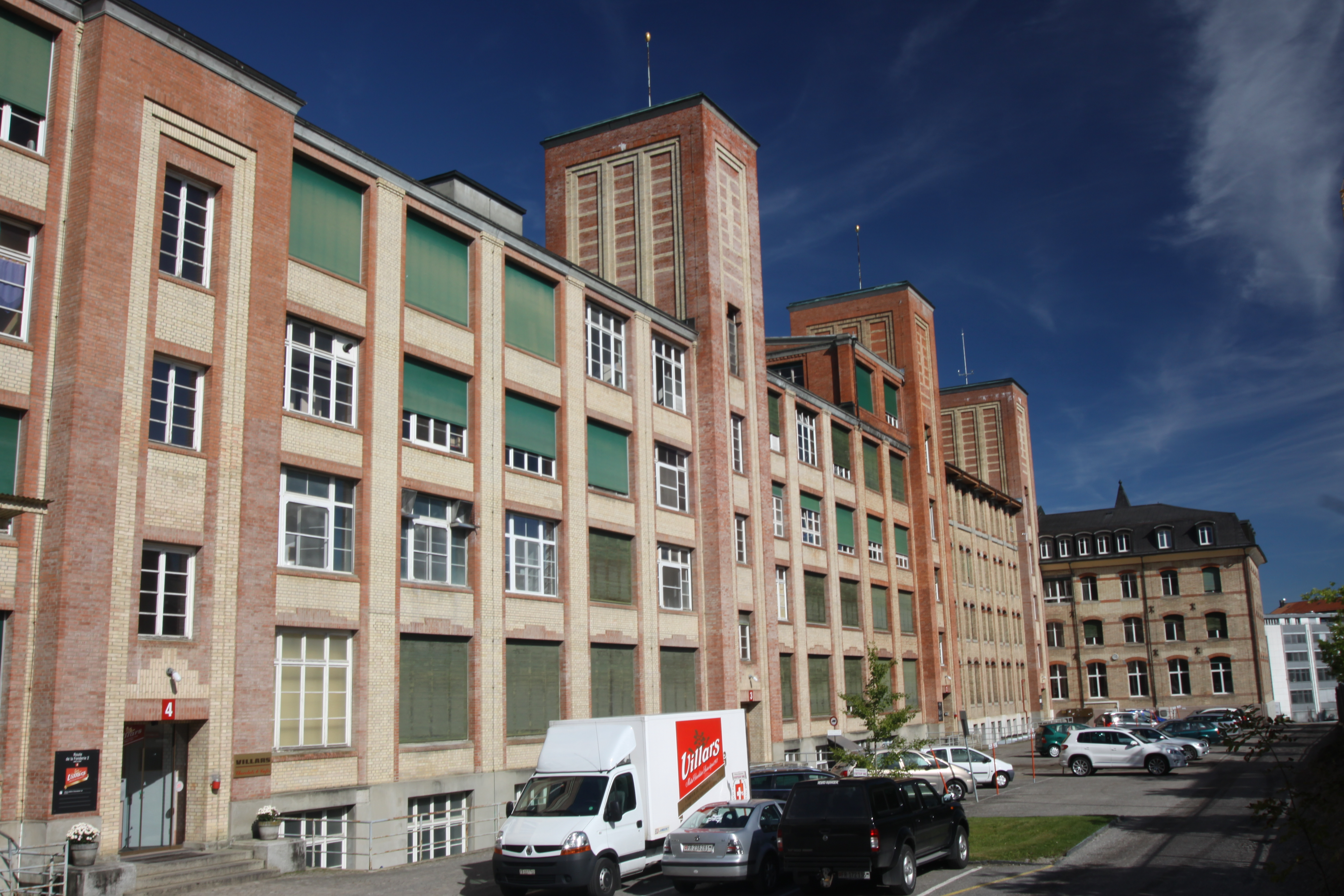
- Factory building of «Chocolat Villars» in Fribourg (Switzerland)
- ISIN: CH0002609656
- Industry: Food
- Founder: Wilhelm Kaiser
- Website: villars.com/en/

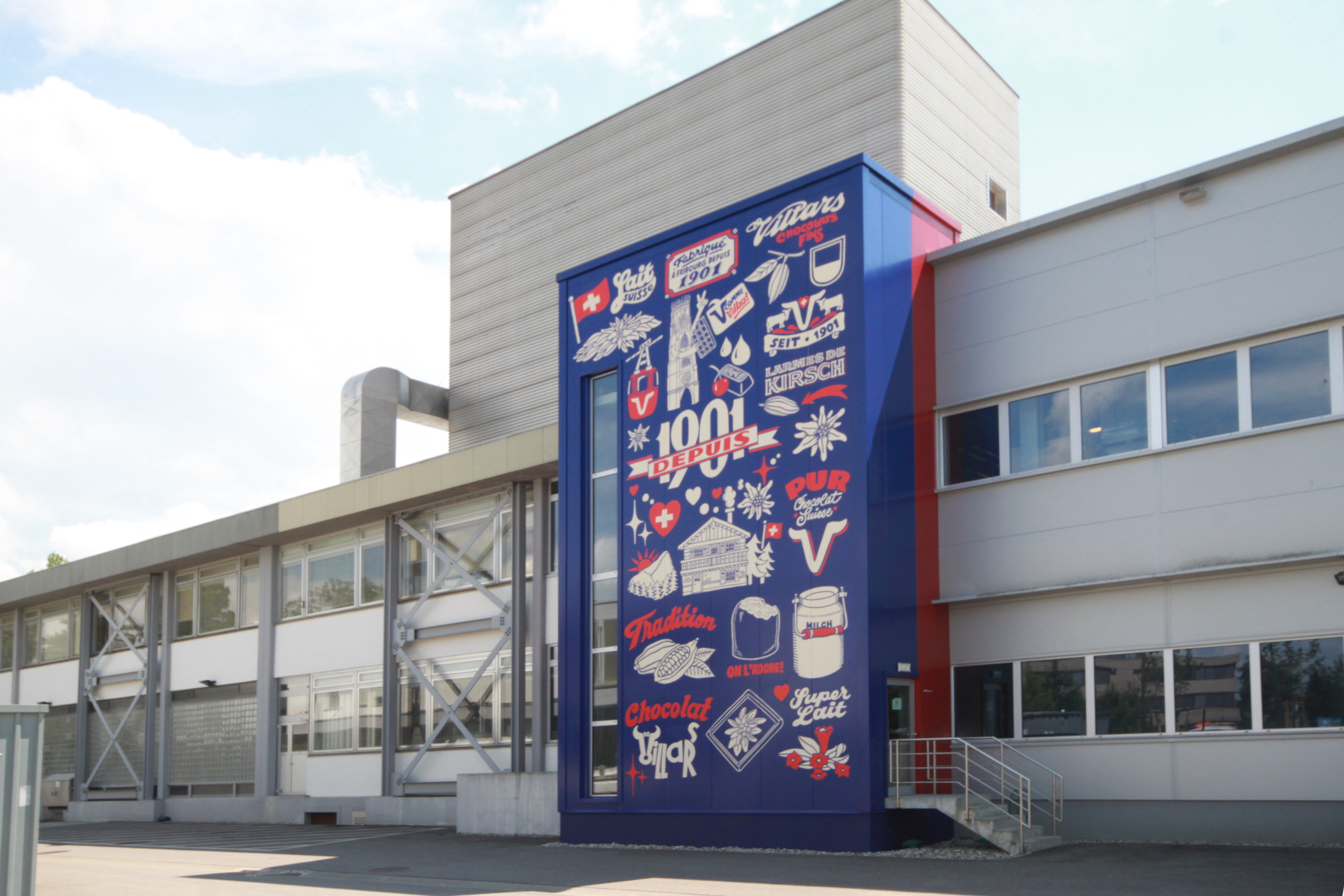
Fresco by Serge Nidegger, 2021, to celebrate 120 years of the company Villars Maître Chocolatier

Villars Maître Chocolatier SA is a Swiss chocolate company founded in 1901 and based in the city of Fribourg. The building in which the company has been in since 1901 is one of national importance and a Swiss cultural heritage asset. The company is noted for its success in selling to tourists, owing to a number of unique products including chocolates with an unusually high percentage of nuts and almonds and 72% cocoa dark chocolate napolitains.

== History ==
The chocolate company was founded by Wilhelm Kaiser in 1901 in Villars-sur-Glâne. In 1904 the company was given the name Villars AG. Chocolat Villars was repeatedly honoured for its creations and received several royal warrants of appointment. In 1915, Chocolat Villars was the first employer in Switzerland to grant its employees two weeks of paid leave.

In 1935 Kaiser passed away. The same year, a coffee roastery was added and the first chocolate bar filled with liqueur was launched. The company remained a family business until 1969 when Wilhelm's son, Oliver Kaiser, passed away. It was then taken over by his trustee, who then renamed it to Villars Holding.

In 1985, Villars Holding sold the chocolate production to Cremo SA. In 1995 it was acquired by multinational Soparind Bongrain, a group that renamed itself Savencia in 2015. Chocolat Villars is part of the Savencia Gourmet sub-group within the Savencia Group.

Villars primarily produces milk chocolate bars. Among milk chocolate products are terroir milk bars containing milk from a specific region, such as Vaud, Fribourg, Bern and Lucerne (all being located on the Alpine foothills).

Since 2017, for chocolate with the Swiss cross and the Swiss designation, at least 80% of the ingredients must come from Switzerland. In addition, the processing that gives the product its special properties must take place in Switzerland. Chocolat Villars bases its marketing on Swissness. According to its own declaration, it processes 100% Swiss milk, 100% Swiss sugar and 100% Swiss alcohol. The company is a member of Chocosuisse, the association responsible for protecting the "Swiss" brand.

Since 2009, Chocolat Villars has also been offering products with the sugar substitute stevia.

The company employed around 1,200 people in the 1920s, after the Second World War only around 400 and in the year 2000 around 100. In 2021, the company employed 210 people at its Swiss factory in Freiburg. The company is now managed by Stephan Buchser, who succeeded Jean-Pierre Geneslay in April 2018.

In 2021, the company celebrated its 120-year history with a mural on the building in Freiburg, by Serge Nidegger (aka Serge Lowrider), an international street artist. It represents important products in the history of the company using various symbols or logos.

In December 2022 a second shop called "La Fabrik" opened near Villars headquarters. From 2023, it will offer cooking workshops and is expected to attract around 50,000 visitors per year.

== Culture ==
The Chocolat Villars factory building in Freiburg is a cultural asset of national importance in the canton of Freiburg and was already used as a chocolate factory when it was founded in 1901.

The so-called "Villars cow", created by the Zug artist Martin Peikert as an advertising figure, was a well-known advertising medium for Chocolat Villars throughout Switzerland for a long time. Their number had to be greatly reduced, partly due to safety regulations in the Swiss Traffic Act. The municipality of Bichelsee-Balterswil fought for the preservation of this cow on its municipal territory, but it is no longer allowed to advertise Chocolat Villars.

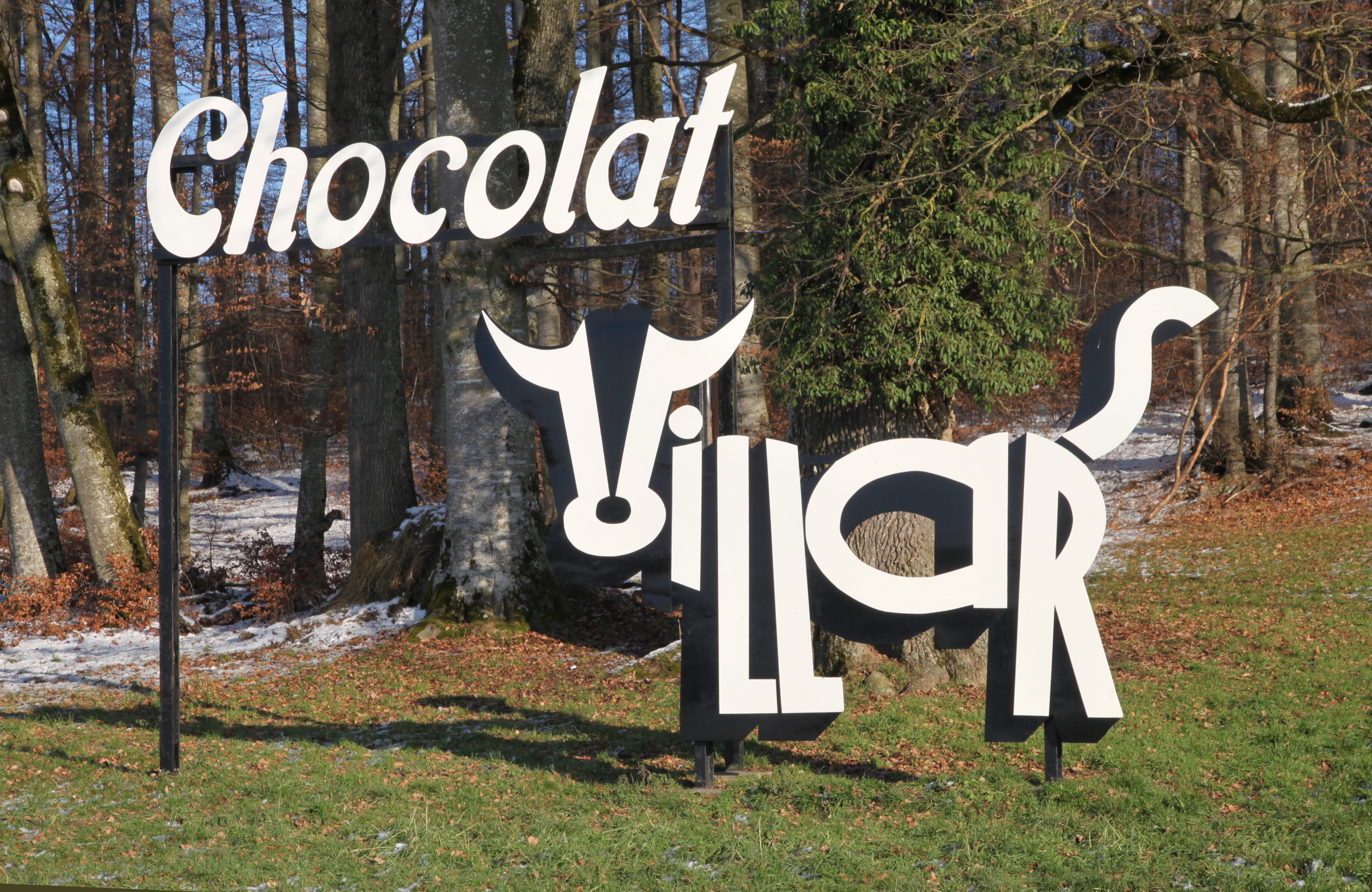
Original advertisement from Martin Peikert, Villars-sur-Glâne, Canton Freiburg

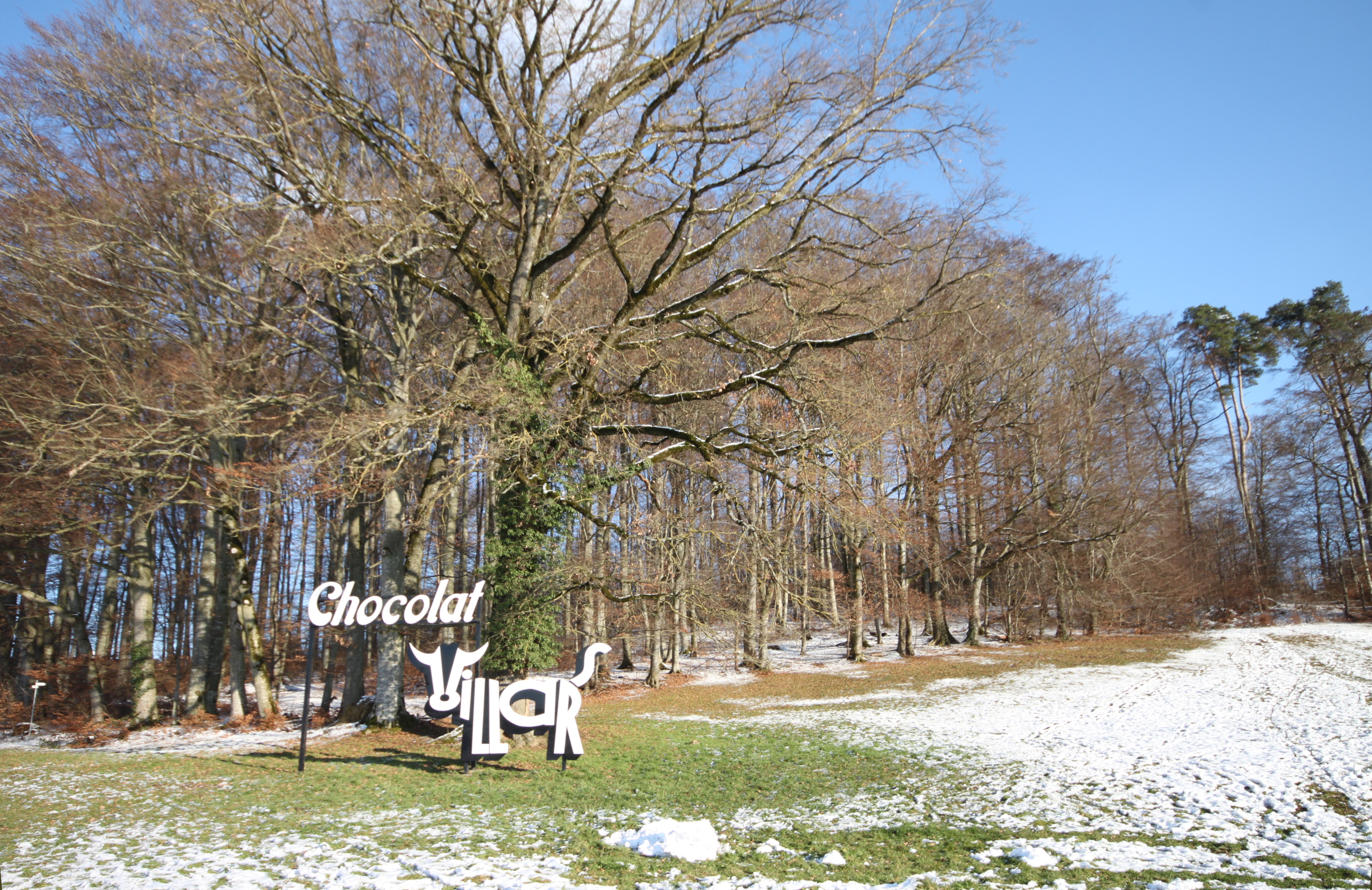
"Villars-Cow", well known throughout Switzerland, first introduced in 1928

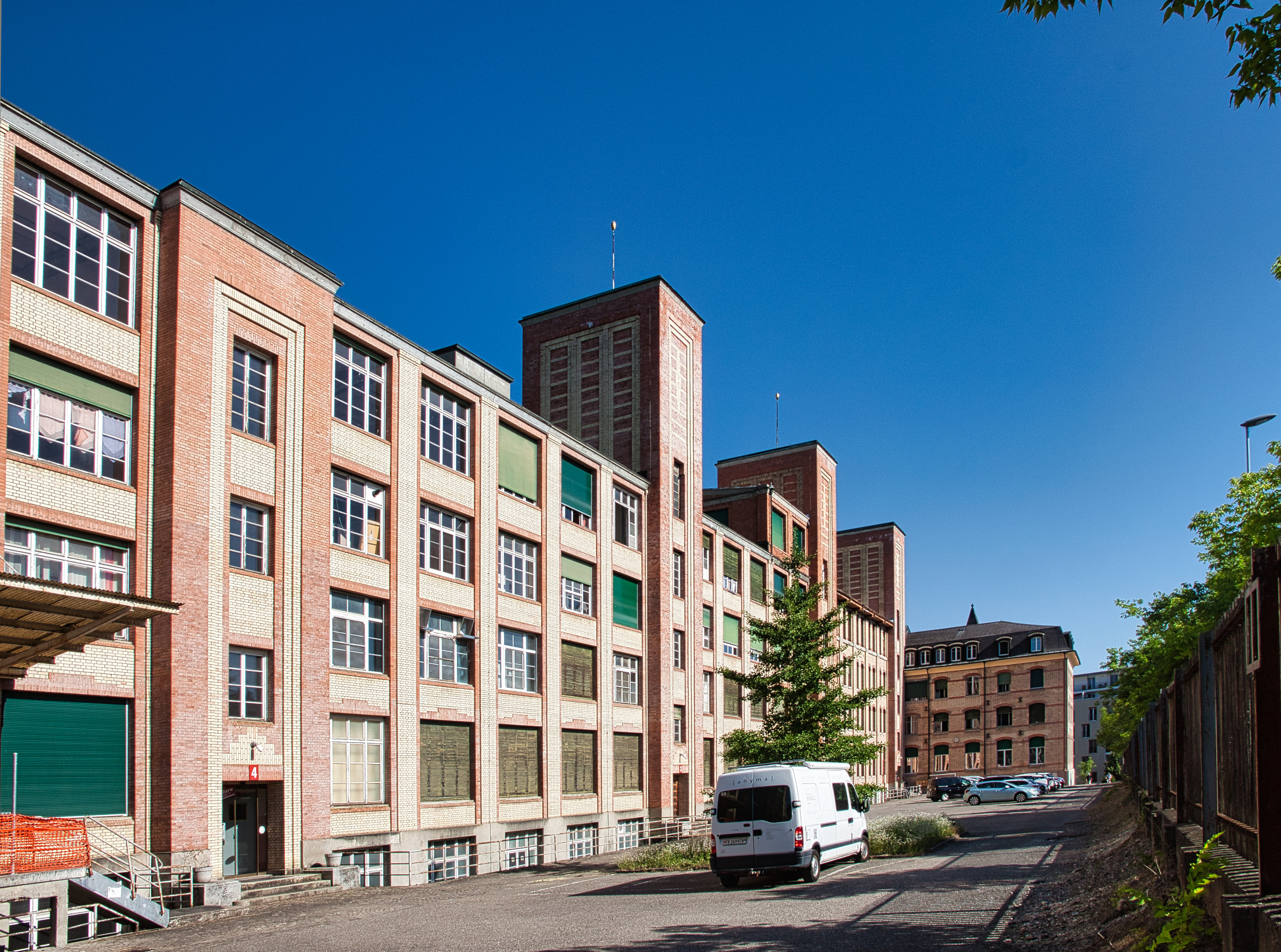
Old factory in Freiburg

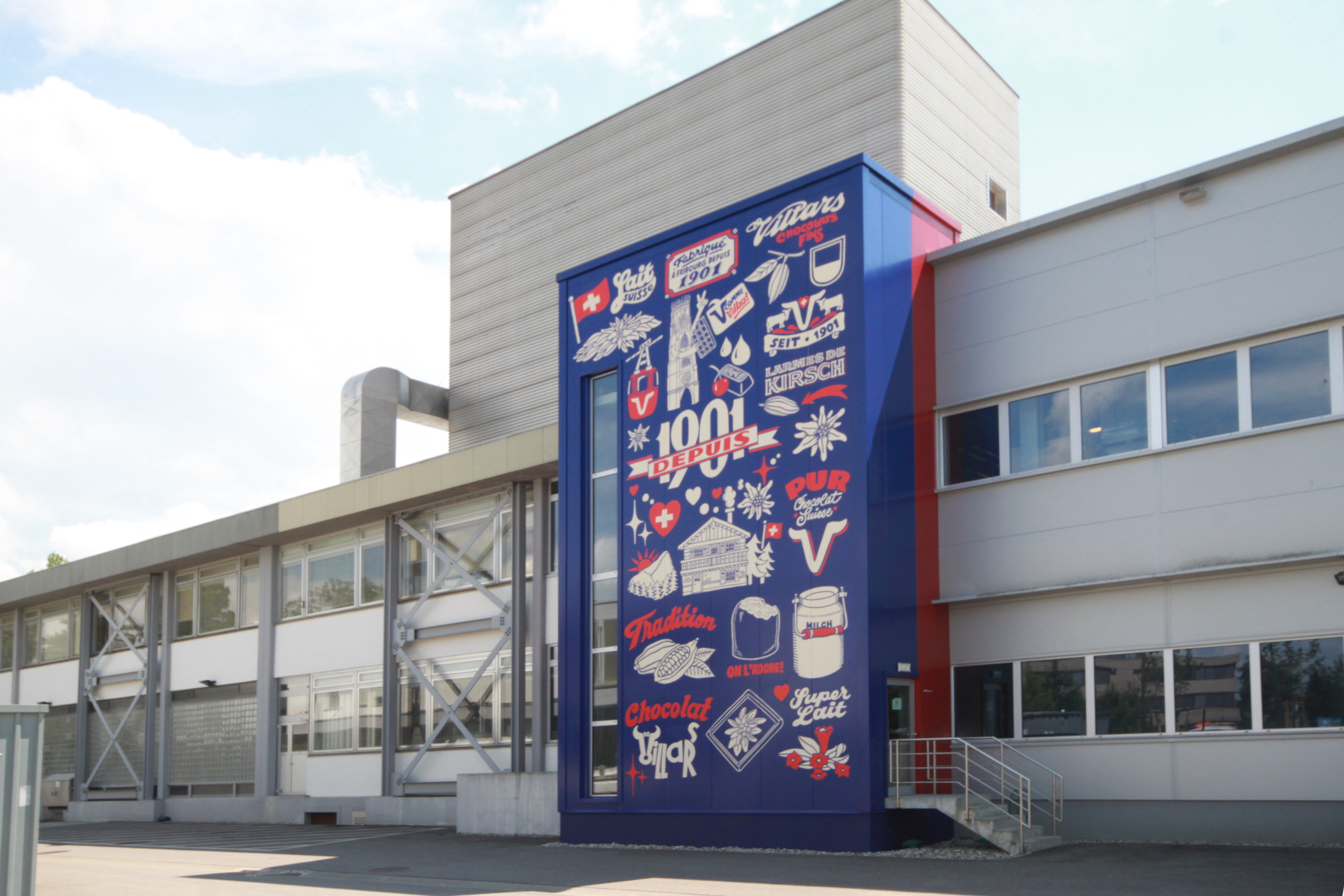
12 m high Graffiti by Serge Nidegger for the 120th anniversary of the company at the office in Freiburg

== See also ==
- List of bean-to-bar chocolate manufacturers
