= Rüdtligen-Alchenflüh =

- Municipality
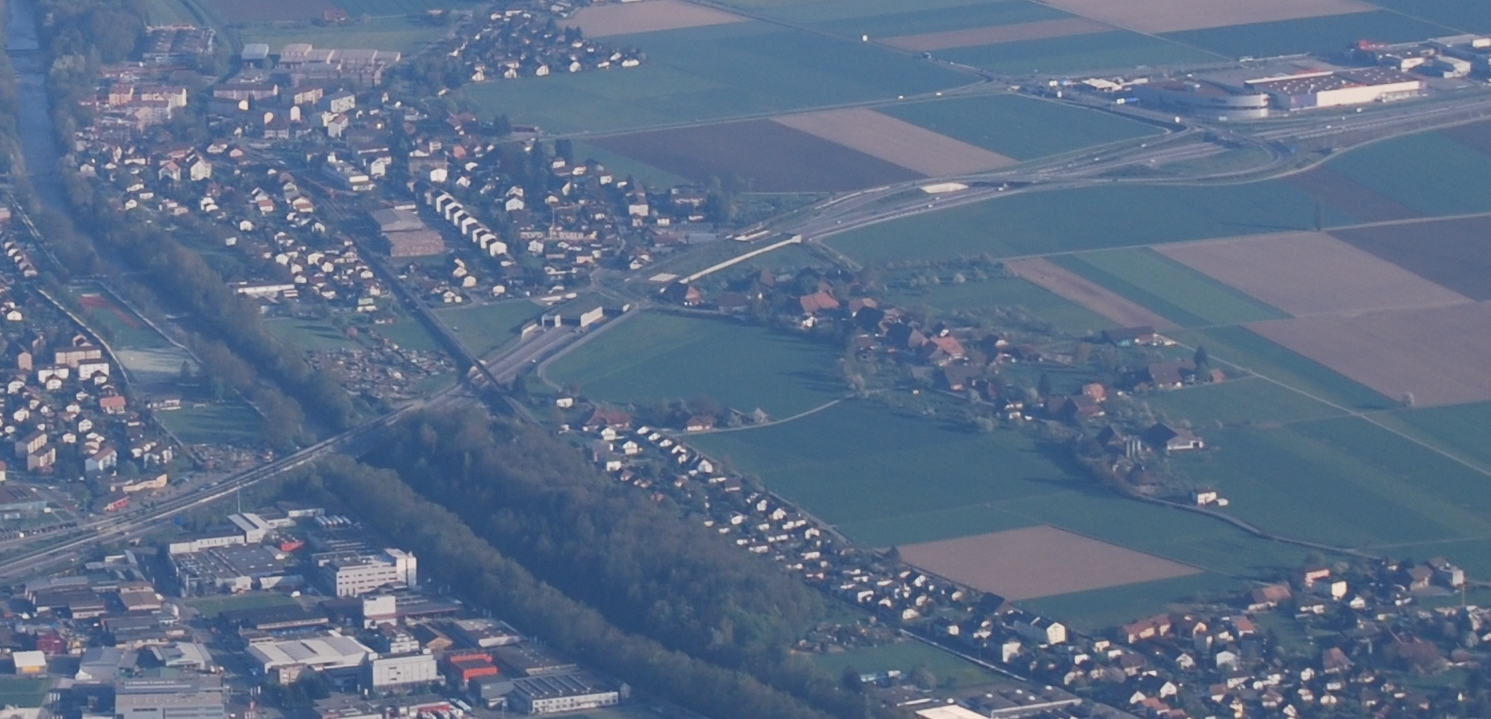

- Flag Coat of arms
- Location of Rüdtligen-Alchenflüh
- Location within Switzerland Location within Canton of Bern
- Coordinates: 47°5′N 7°35′E
- Country: Switzerland
- Canton: Bern
- District: Emmental

Government
  - Executive: Gemeinderat with 5 members
  - Mayor: Gemeindepräsident(in); Patrizia Lambroia SPS/PSS (as of 2026)

Area
  - Total: 2.72 km^{2} (1.05 sq mi)
- Elevation: 505 m (1,657 ft)

Population (December 2020)
  - Total: 2,444
  - Density: 899/km^{2} (2,330/sq mi)
- Time zone: UTC+01:00 (CET)
  - Summer (DST): UTC+02:00 (CEST)
- Postal code: 3422
- SFOS number: 420
- ISO 3166 code: CH-BE
- Surrounded by: Aefligen, Fraubrunnen, Kirchberg, Lyssach, Utzenstorf
- Website: www.ruedtligen-alchenflueh.ch

Rüdtligen-Alchenflüh is a municipality in the administrative district of Emmental in the canton of Bern in Switzerland.

== History ==
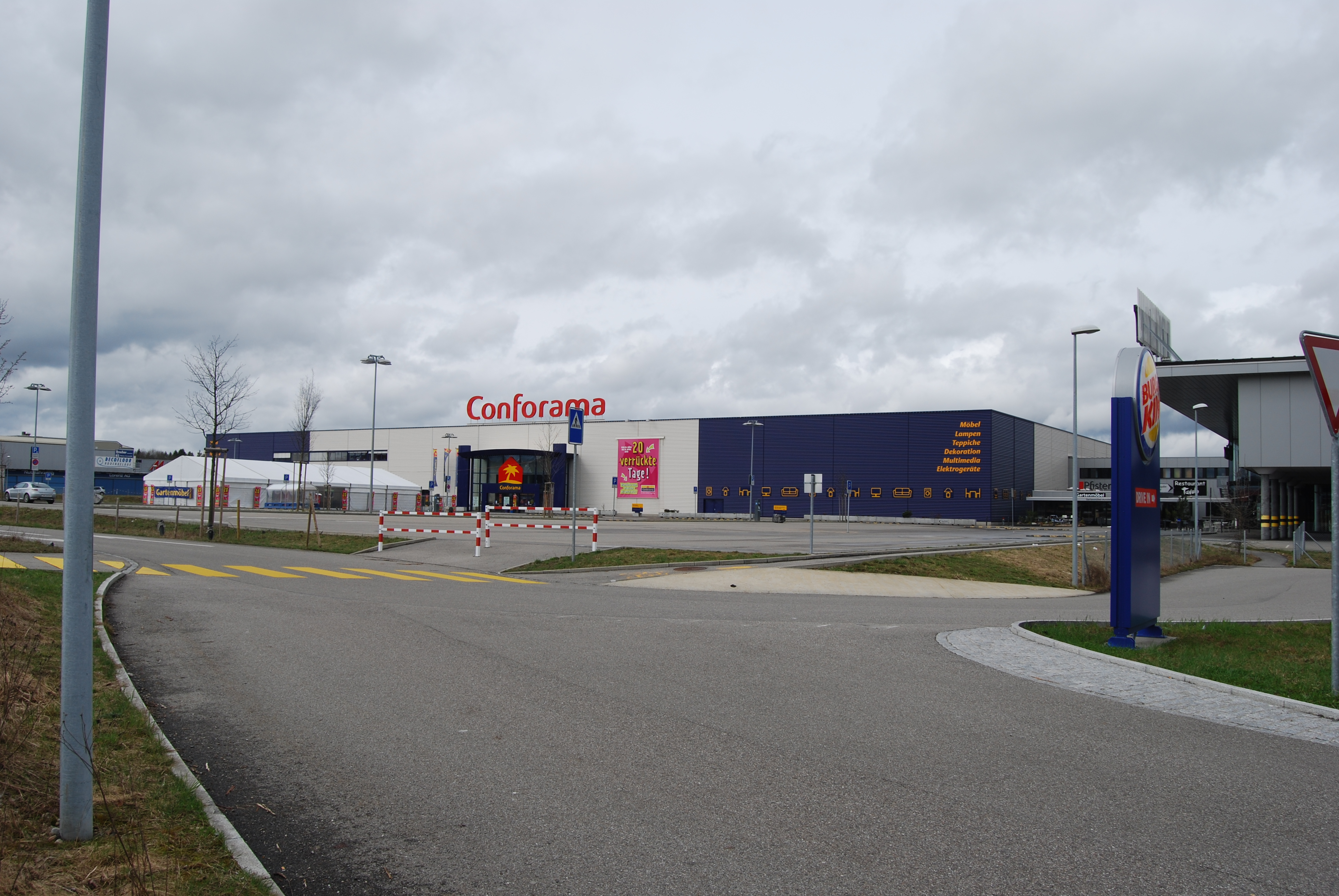
Conforama furniture factory in Rüdtligen-Alchenflüh

Alchenflüh is first mentioned in 1409 as Alchenfluo. Rüdtligen is first mentioned in 1241 as Ruetilingin. In 1833 Rüdtligen and Alchenflüh merged into a single municipality.

Alchenflüh was part of the neighboring villages for the Burgundian royal fortress of Kirchberg. It passed over to Selz Abbey in 994 together with Kirchberg.

During the Late Middle Ages and the Early Modern Period Rüdtligen was part of the low court of Alchenflüh. Until 1528, Fraubrunnen Abbey was the largest landholder in Rüdtligen. In 1640, Rüdtligen and Alchenflüh worked together in the construction of the Kirchberg bridge.

The inhabitants of both villages were part of the parish of Kirchberg. In the 17th century, Aefligen, Lyssach, Ruti, Rüdtligen and Alchenflüh formed a school district with a school house in Alchenflüh. In 1730 the school district split and Aefligen, Rüdtligen and Alchenflüh formed a district.

During the 19th century, the farms began to change from growing grain to raising dairy cattle. By 1856 there were enough dairy farmers for a dairy to open in Alchenflüh. A warehouse was built two years later in 1858. The Burgdorf-Solothurn railroad opened a station in the municipality in 1876. The municipality grew slowly until 1965, when the A1 motorway was built between the two villages. The motorway brought new businesses and commuters to the municipality. Three new housing developments were built to house to growing population. New school buildings were built in 1969-70, 1989 and in 2006 and a kindergarten opened in 1987-88. Before the 1960s there was some industry in the municipality, including a gravel quarry and a printing factory. These were joined after 1969 by a machine factory, a distribution center for Emmi Käse AG, a regional potato storage station, and the Conforama and Pfister furniture factories. The Lyssach-Alchenflüh shopping center was built along the motorway and is shared between the two communities. A proposed merger with Kirchberg was rejected by the latter in a vote in 1973.

== Geography ==
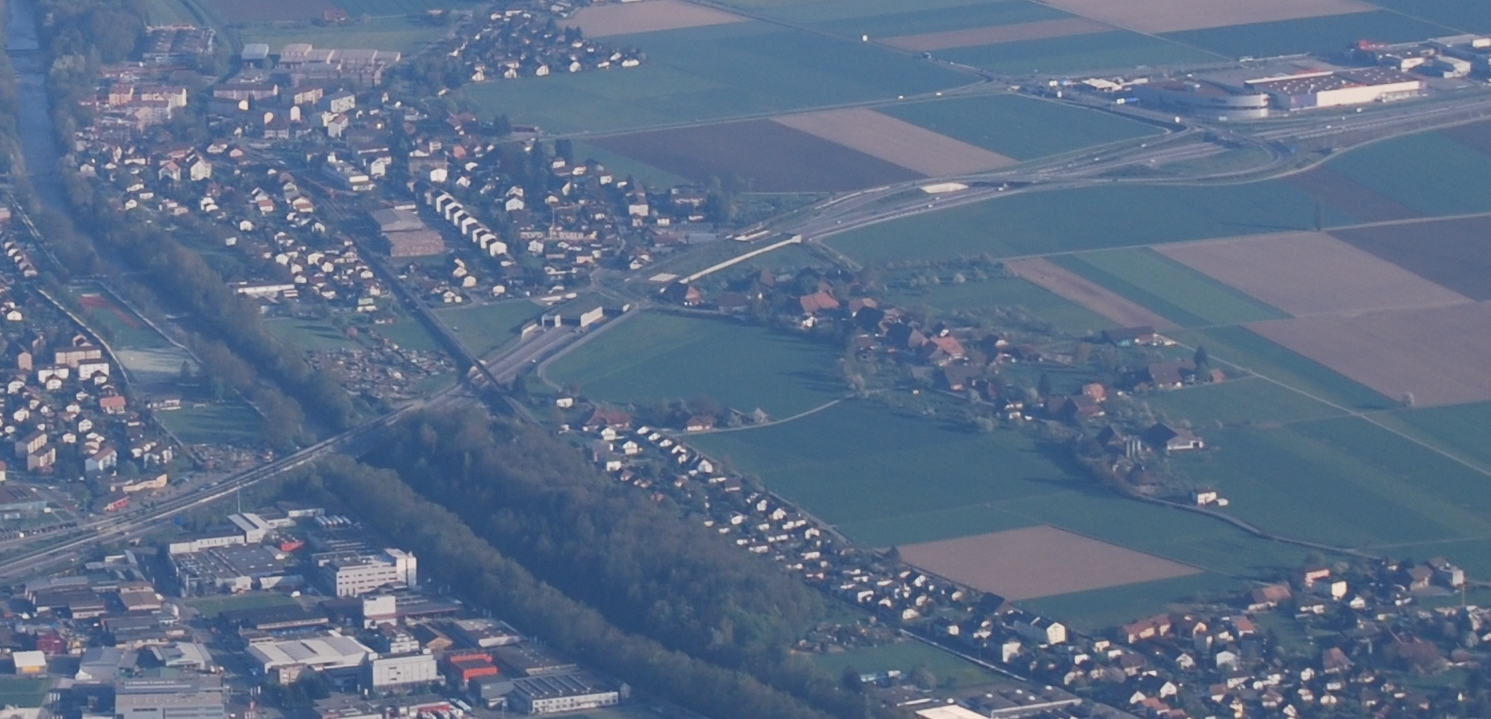
Aerial view of Rüdtligen-Alchenflüh. The Lyssach-Alchenflüh shopping center is visible on the left. Rüdtligen in the foreground, Alchenflüh in the background.

Rüdtligen-Alchenflüh has an area of 2.72 km^{2} (1.05 sq mi). Of this area, 1.66 km^{2} (0.64 mi^{2}) or 60.8% is used for agricultural purposes, while 0.16 km^{2} (0.062 mi^{2}) or 5.9% is forested. Of the rest of the land, 0.83 km^{2} (0.32 mi^{2}) or 30.4% is settled (buildings or roads), 0.05 km^{2} (12 acres) or 1.8% is either rivers or lakes.

Of the built up area, industrial buildings made up 3.7% of the total area while housing and buildings made up 13.6% and transportation infrastructure made up 9.2%. Power and water infrastructure as well as other special developed areas made up 2.6% of the area while parks, green belts and sports fields made up 1.5%. Out of the forested land, 3.3% of the total land area is heavily forested and 2.6% is covered with orchards or small clusters of trees. Of the agricultural land, 50.9% is used for growing crops and 7.0% is pastures, while 2.9% is used for orchards or vine crops. All the water in the municipality is flowing water.

The municipality is located on the left bank of the Emme river. It consists of the villages of Rüdtligen and Alchenflüh.

On 31 December 2009 Amtsbezirk Burgdorf, the municipality's former district, was dissolved. On the following day, 1 January 2010, it joined the newly created Verwaltungskreis Emmental.

== Coat of arms ==
The blazon of the municipal coat of arms is Per fess Or a Hunting Dog statant Gules and of the second a Mullet between a pair of Antlers of the first issuant from a Mount of 3 Coupeaux Vert.

== Demographics ==
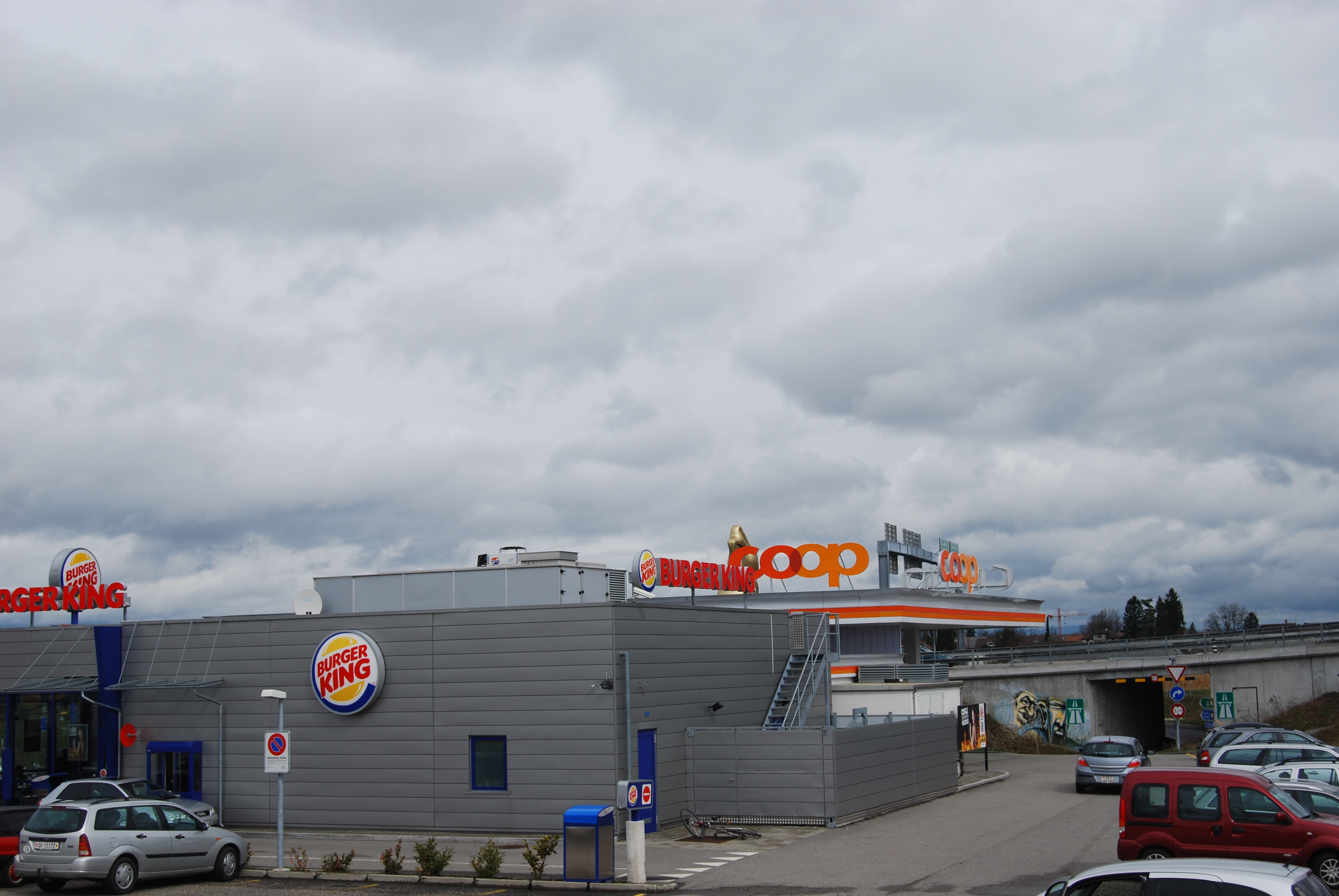
Grocery store and fast food in Rüdtligen-Alchenflüh

Rüdtligen-Alchenflüh has a population (as of December 2020) of 2,444. As of 2010, 24.4% of the population are resident foreign nationals. Over the last 10 years (2000-2010) the population has changed at a rate of 2.3%. Migration accounted for 0%, while births and deaths accounted for 3.8%.

Most of the population (as of 2000) speaks German (1,785 or 85.2%) as their first language, Italian is the second most common (79 or 3.8%) and Albanian is the third (49 or 2.3%). There are 18 people who speak French and 3 people who speak Romansh.

As of 2008, the population was 50.4% male and 49.6% female. The population was made up of 825 Swiss men (38.0% of the population) and 268 (12.4%) non-Swiss men. There were 814 Swiss women (37.5%) and 262 (12.1%) non-Swiss women. Of the population in the municipality, 420 or about 20.1% were born in Rüdtligen-Alchenflüh and lived there in 2000. There were 970 or 46.3% who were born in the same canton, while 245 or 11.7% were born somewhere else in Switzerland, and 384 or 18.3% were born outside of Switzerland.

As of 2010, children and teenagers (0–19 years old) make up 21.4% of the population, while adults (20–64 years old) make up 62.8% and seniors (over 64 years old) make up 15.7%.

As of 2000, there were 884 people who were single and never married in the municipality. There were 993 married individuals, 106 widows or widowers and 111 individuals who are divorced.

As of 2000, there were 303 households that consist of only one person and 60 households with five or more people. In 2000, a total of 869 apartments (92.8% of the total) were permanently occupied, while 44 apartments (4.7%) were seasonally occupied and 23 apartments (2.5%) were empty. As of 2010, the construction rate of new housing units was 4.1 new units per 1000 residents. The vacancy rate for the municipality, in 2011, was 5.31%.

The historical population is given in the following chart:

== Politics ==
In the 2011 federal election the most popular party was the Swiss People's Party (SVP) which received 41.4% of the vote. The next three most popular parties were the Conservative Democratic Party (BDP) (17.3%), the Social Democratic Party (SP) (15.4%) and the FDP.The Liberals (6.6%). In the federal election, a total of 531 votes were cast, and the voter turnout was 38.3%.

== Economy ==
As of 2011, Rüdtligen-Alchenflüh had an unemployment rate of 4.21%. As of 2008, there were a total of 906 people employed in the municipality. Of these, there were 33 people employed in the primary economic sector and about 9 businesses involved in this sector. 417 people were employed in the secondary sector and there were 18 businesses in this sector. 456 people were employed in the tertiary sector, with 53 businesses in this sector.

In 2008 there were a total of 777 full-time equivalent jobs. The number of jobs in the primary sector was 23, all of which were in agriculture. The number of jobs in the secondary sector was 389 of which 355 or (91.3%) were in manufacturing and 35 (9.0%) were in construction. The number of jobs in the tertiary sector was 365. In the tertiary sector; 211 or 57.8% were in wholesale or retail sales or the repair of motor vehicles, 19 or 5.2% were in the movement and storage of goods, 32 or 8.8% were in a hotel or restaurant, 7 or 1.9% were technical professionals or scientists, 19 or 5.2% were in education and 10 or 2.7% were in health care.

In 2000, there were 224 workers who commuted into the municipality and 990 workers who commuted away. The municipality is a net exporter of workers, with about 4.4 workers leaving the municipality for every one entering. Of the working population, 15.9% used public transportation to get to work, and 56.6% used a private car.

== Religion ==
From the 2000 census, 305 or 14.6% were Roman Catholic, while 1,298 or 62.0% belonged to the Swiss Reformed Church. Of the rest of the population, there were 30 members of an Orthodox church (or about 1.43% of the population), there was 1 individual who belongs to the Christian Catholic Church, and there were 60 individuals (or about 2.87% of the population) who belonged to another Christian church. There were 2 individuals (or about 0.10% of the population) who were Jewish, and 171 (or about 8.17% of the population) who were Islamic. There were 12 individuals who were Buddhist, 60 individuals who were Hindu and 3 individuals who belonged to another church. 91 (or about 4.35% of the population) belonged to no church, are agnostic or atheist, and 91 individuals (or about 4.35% of the population) did not answer the question.

== Education ==
In Rüdtligen-Alchenflüh about 803 or (38.3%) of the population have completed non-mandatory upper secondary education, and 181 or (8.6%) have completed additional higher education (either university or a Fachhochschule). Of the 181 who completed tertiary schooling, 69.1% were Swiss men, 22.7% were Swiss women, 3.3% were non-Swiss men and 5.0% were non-Swiss women.

The Canton of Bern school system provides one year of non-obligatory Kindergarten, followed by six years of Primary school. This is followed by three years of obligatory lower Secondary school where the students are separated according to ability and aptitude. Following the lower Secondary students may attend additional schooling or they may enter an apprenticeship.

During the 2010-11 school year, there were a total of 214 students attending classes in Rüdtligen-Alchenflüh. There were 2 kindergarten classes with a total of 46 students in the municipality. Of the kindergarten students, 47.8% were permanent or temporary residents of Switzerland (not citizens) and 65.2% have a different mother language than the classroom language. The municipality had 6 primary classes and 123 students. Of the primary students, 31.7% were permanent or temporary residents of Switzerland (not citizens) and 48.0% have a different mother language than the classroom language. During the same year, there were 2 lower secondary classes with a total of 45 students. There were 40.0% who were permanent or temporary residents of Switzerland (not citizens) and 55.6% have a different mother language than the classroom language.

As of 2000, there were 4 students in Rüdtligen-Alchenflüh who came from another municipality, while 202 residents attended schools outside the municipality.
