= Albert Benteli (publisher) =

Swiss publisher and printer

- Born: Ludwig Wilhelm Albert Benteli; June 20, 1867; Berne, Switzerland
- Died: December 11, 1944 (aged 77); Berne, Switzerland
- Occupations: Publisher, printer
- Spouse: Maria Bertha Candelaria Kaiser

Albert Benteli (born Ludwig Wilhelm Albert Benteli; 20 June 1867, Berne – 11 December 1944, Berne) was a Swiss publisher and printer, founder of the Benteli Verlag (publishing house).

== Life and career ==
Benteli was the son of Albert Benteli. He attended school in Berne and passed his Matura there. He then studied theology in Berne, Neuchâtel and Greifswald, after which he served as a pastor and member of the synodal council in Solothurn from 1888 to 1891.

In 1891, he joined the firm of his father-in-law, Kaiser & Co. — whose daughter, Maria Bertha Candelaria Kaiser, he had married — as director of the publishing department. In 1897, he took over the Collin printing house, which relocated to a new building in Bümpliz in 1906.

Two years later, in 1908, Benteli founded Benteli Verlag. It quickly gained a prominent role in Swiss publishing through notable works in literature, the arts, and children's and youth books, as well as careful attention to color art reproduction. Having studied fine arts himself, Benteli became friends with major artists including Ferdinand Hodler, Cuno Amiet and Walter Linck. He founded the journal Das Werk and was one of the co-founders of Heimatschutz (the Swiss heritage protection organization).

== Bibliography ==
=== Sources ===
- Schweizerische Buchdrucker-Zeitung, 70/2, 1945, pp. 7–8
