= Trachselwald Castle =

Castle in Bern, Switzerland

- Schloss Trachselwald
- Trachselwald
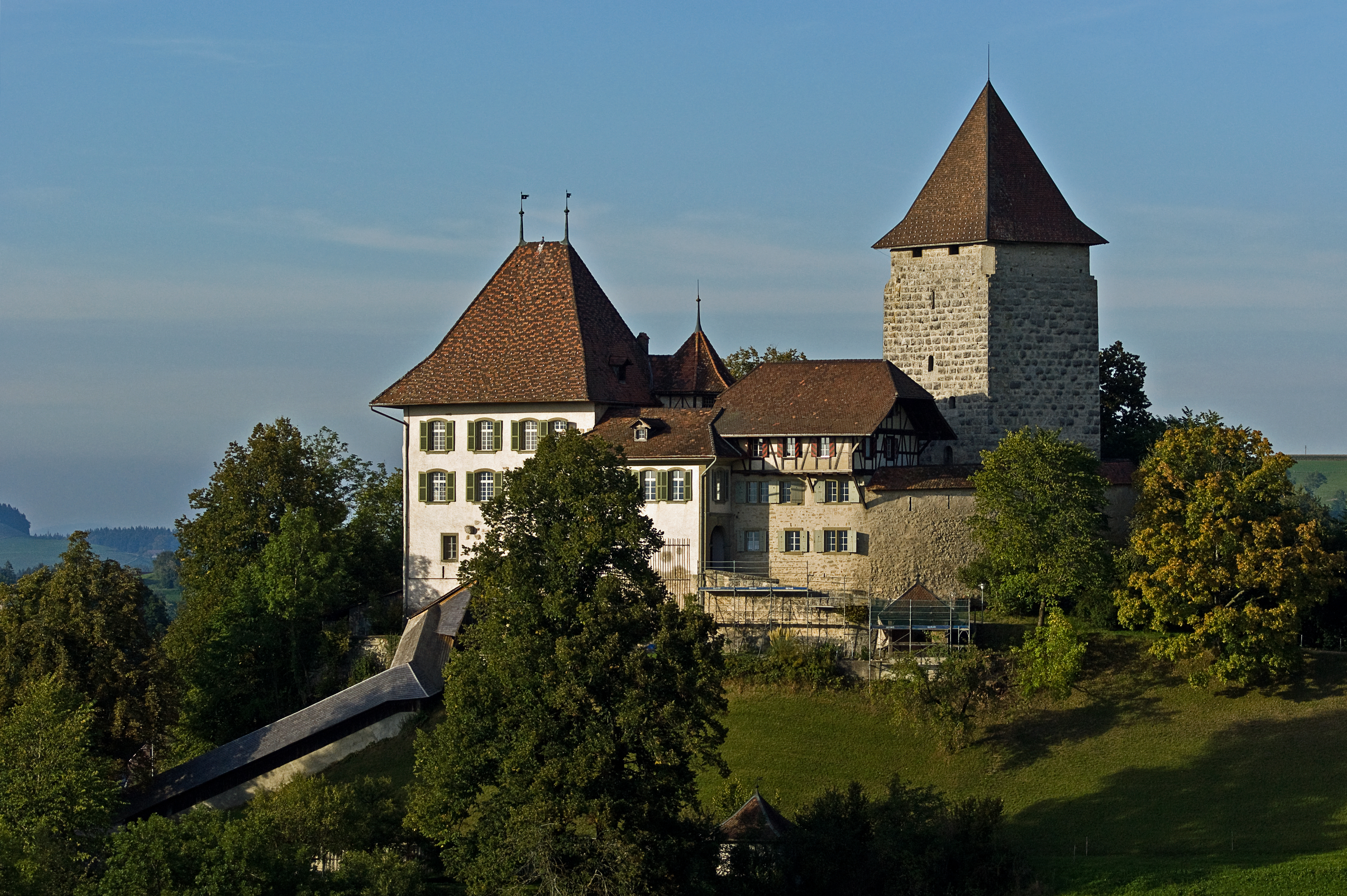
- Trachselwald Castle

Site information
- Type: Hill castle
- Code: CH-BE
- Condition: Preserved

Location
- Coordinates: 47.01751°N 7.74186°E

Site history
- Built: Probably 11th or 12th century
- Materials: Rusticated ashlar of Tuff

Trachselwald Castle (German: Schloss Trachselwald) is a castle in the municipality of Trachselwald in the canton of Bern, Switzerland. It is a Swiss heritage site of national significance.

== History ==
The name of the rulers of the castle was first mentioned in 1131. The castle itself may date back to the 10th century but the 11th or 12th century is more likely. At first it belonged to the barons of Trachselwald, then to the barons of Rüti bei Lyssach, and then those of Sumiswald. The barons of Sumiswald sold the castle and surrounding lands to the city of Bern. Bern turned the castle into a sheriffhood.

The castle was rebuilt or expanded several times. Its oldest parts are the keep, which was built out of tuff, and one half of the main building. These parts of the castle were built in the second half of the 12th century. The stair tower was probably built by a master craftsman from Prismell in 1641.

During the Swiss peasant war of 1653, the peasant leader Niklaus Leuenberger, who was arrested on 19 June 1653 was held in Castle Trachselwald until being taken to Bern, where he was executed on 27 August.

The castle was sacked during the 1798 French invasion, but was not burned. It became the center of administration of the district of Trachselwald.

Trachselwald Castle became a prison where Mennonites were held, some of whom were then executed for their beliefs which differed from the ruling Reformed Protestants. In 2021 an exhibit opened in the castle's prison documenting the oppression of Mennonites in the region.

== Castle site ==
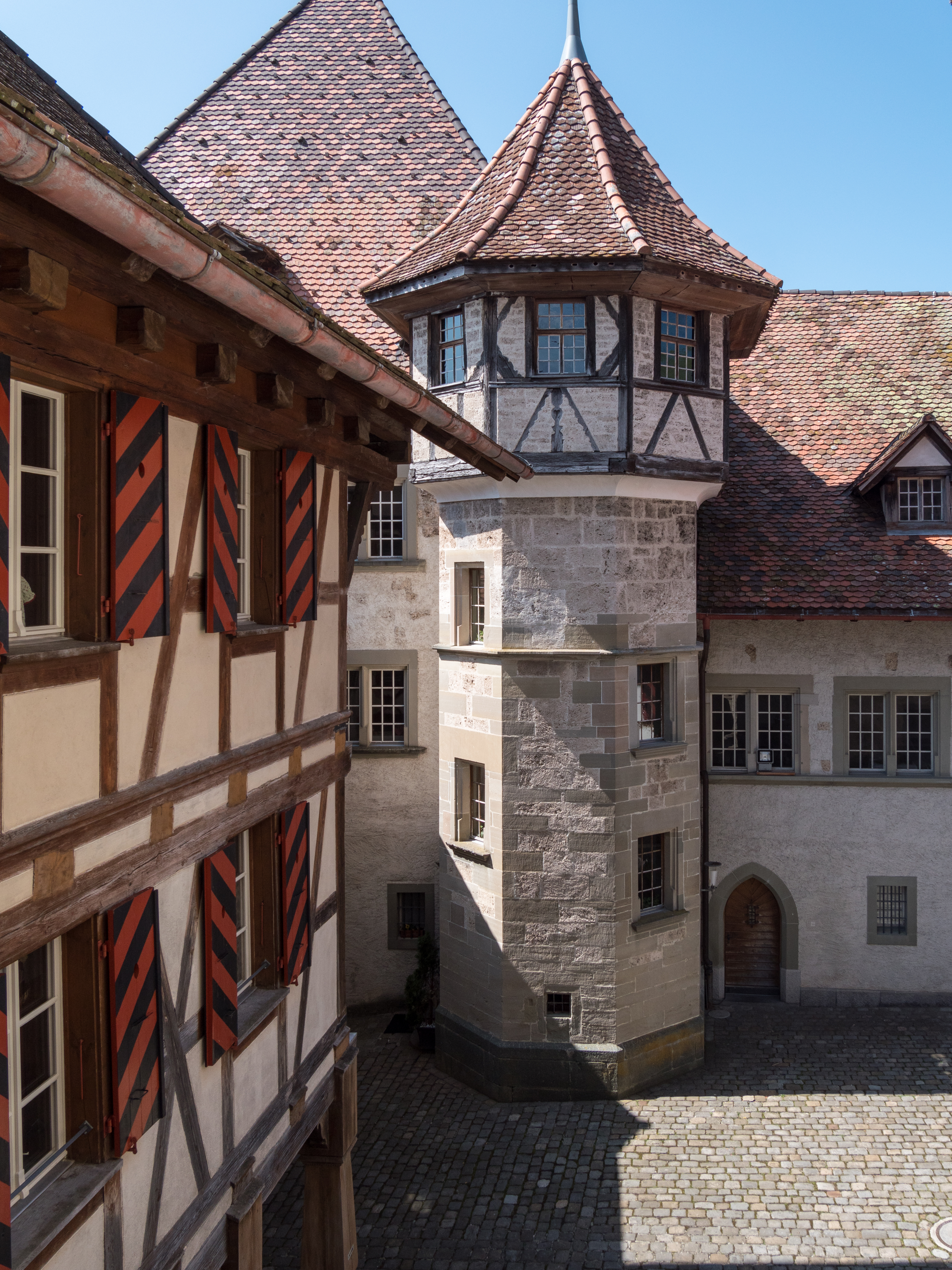
Courtyard

The first castle consisted of a square keep that was about 10 m (33 ft) on each side. The walls were up to 2.7 m (8.9 ft) thick. The keep and outer walls are made of tuff stone cut into roughly squared blocks which indicates construction before 1200. Dating of the beams by dendrochronology indicates that they came from 1251 to 1253. Along with the keep, part of the main building was added during this first construction period. The original keep was probably surrounded by an elliptical ring wall.

In the 14th century the original two-story keep doubled in height. In the 16th or 17th century a palas, dungeon and other buildings were added to the castle. The new additions were built in a Romanesque style, which included larger windows and thinner walls. A stair tower was added in 1641 and a granary was built in 1683. The palas was renovated during the 17th and 18th century into its current appearance. In 1751 a new, more decorative gate house was built along with a french garden.
