= Trachselwald =

- Municipality
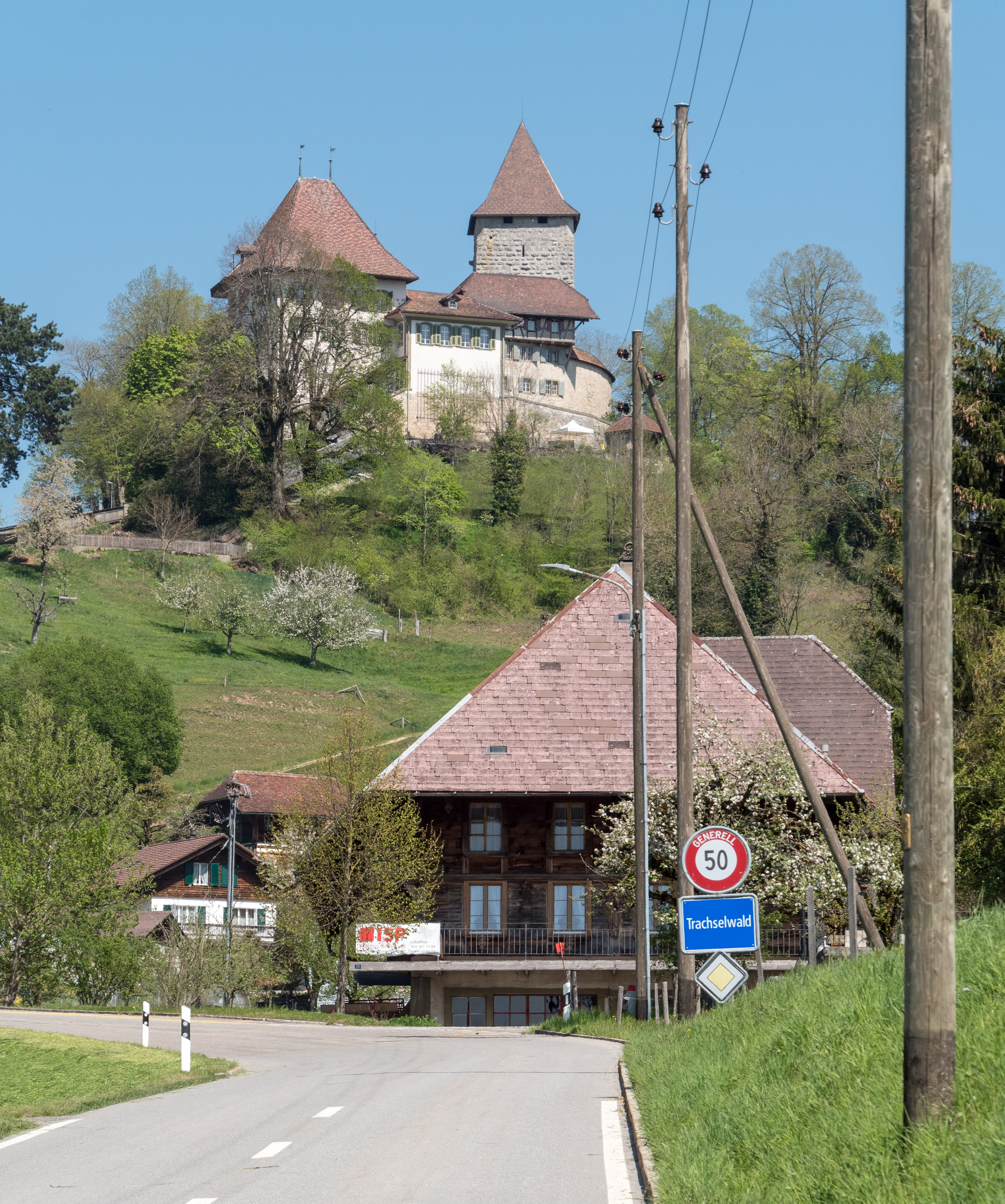

- Flag Coat of arms
- Location of Trachselwald
- Location within Switzerland Location within Canton of Bern
- Coordinates: 47°1′N 7°43′E
- Country: Switzerland
- Canton: Bern
- District: Emmental

Government
  - Executive: Gemeinderat with 5 members
  - Mayor: Gemeindepräsident(in); Martin Hunziker (as of 2026)

Area
  - Total: 15.98 km^{2} (6.17 sq mi)
- Elevation: 685 m (2,247 ft)
- Highest elevation: 1,200 m (3,900 ft)
- Lowest elevation: 660 m (2,170 ft)

Population (December 2020)
  - Total: 954
  - Density: 59.7/km^{2} (155/sq mi)
- Time zone: UTC+01:00 (CET)
  - Summer (DST): UTC+02:00 (CEST)
- Postal code: 3456
- SFOS number: 958
- ISO 3166 code: CH-BE
- Surrounded by: Langnau im Emmental, Lauperswil, Lützelflüh, Rüderswil, Sumiswald
- Website: www.trachselwald.ch

Trachselwald is a municipality in the administrative district of Emmental in the Swiss canton of Bern.

== History ==
The name of this municipality means "Drechsler-Wald" ("Woodturner-Forest) and was first mentioned in 1131 as Trahselwalt. The village around Trachselwald Castle first belonged to the barons of Trachselwald, then to the barons of Rüti bei Lyssach, and then finally to the barons of Sumiswald until the sovereignty over the village was sold to the city of Bern in 1408. The castle became the sheriffhood.

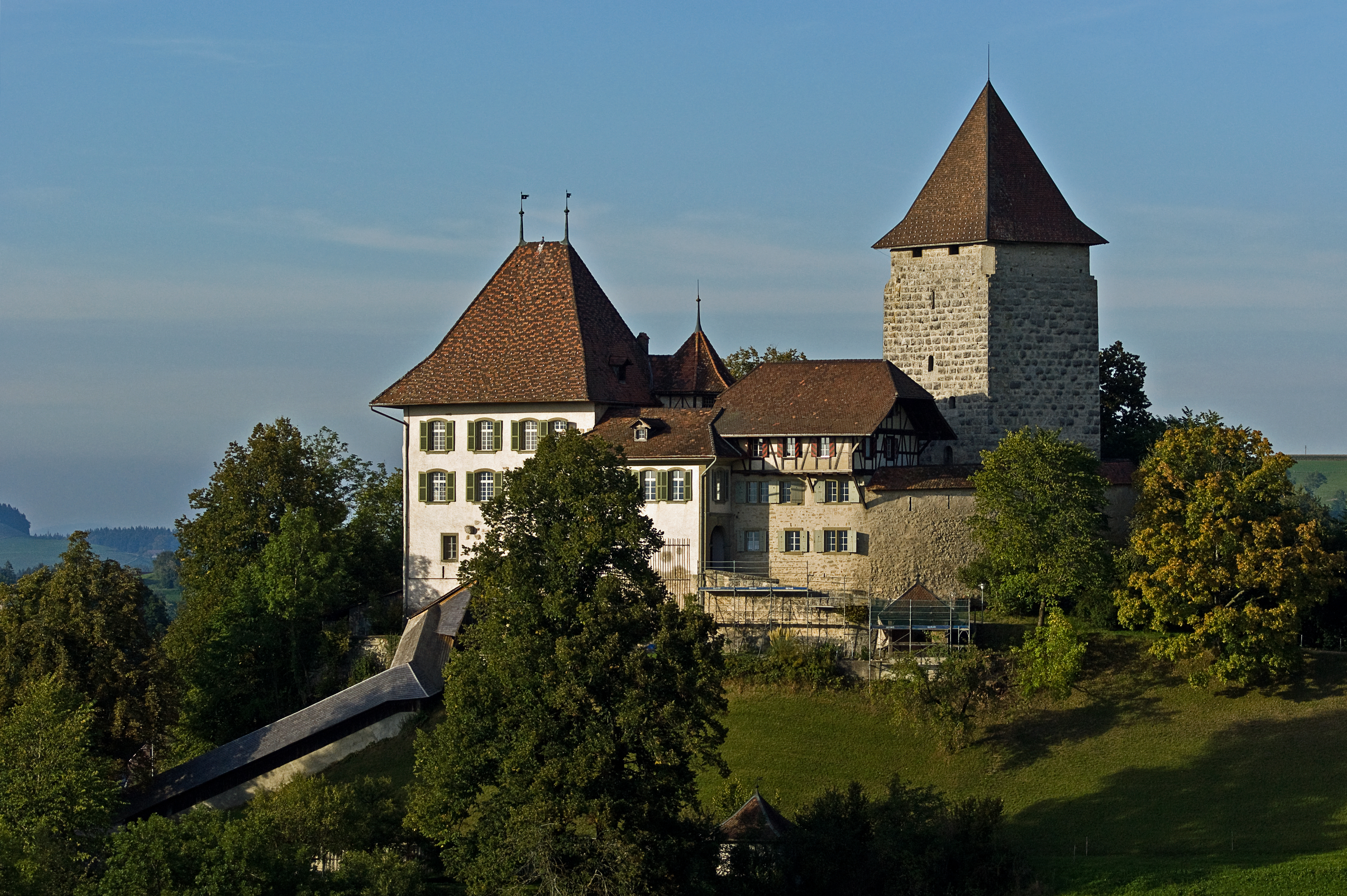
Trachselwald Castle

In 1574 the village was destroyed by a fire. During the Swiss Peasants' War, on 3 April 1653, there was a gathering in the inn Tanne, which became the first public appearance of the peasants' leader Niklaus Leuenberger, who was executed in Trachselwald Castle on August 27 of the same year.

The village church was first mentioned in 1275 and was destroyed in the 1574 fire. It was rebuilt in 1668. The bell tower was first added in 1464 and was rebuilt to its current appearance in 1786.

== Geography ==
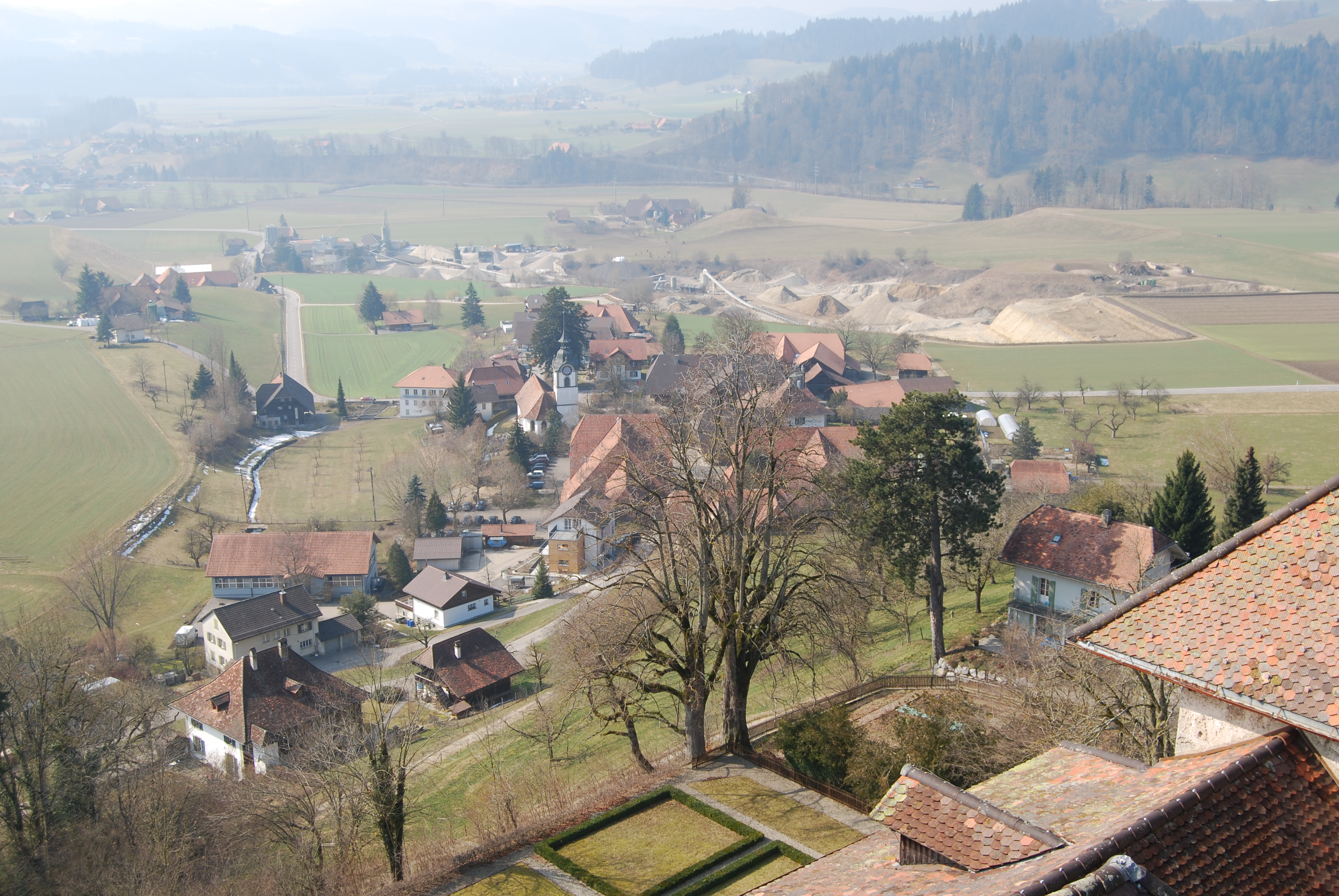
Trachselwald village and surrounding countryside

Aerial view by Walter Mittelholzer (1922)

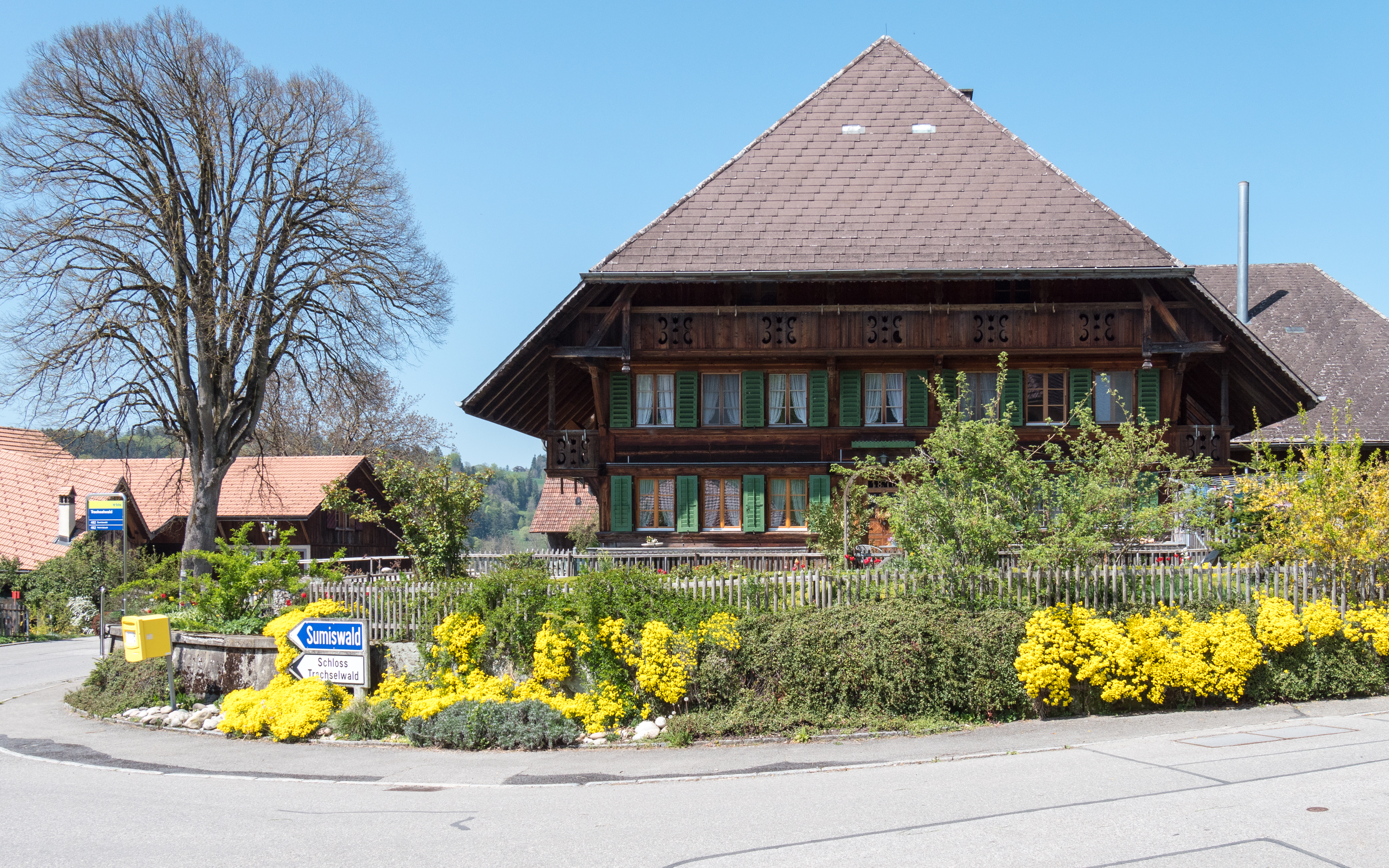
Farmhouse Dorf 4c

Trachselwald has an area of 15.96 km^{2} (6.16 sq mi). As of the 2006 survey, a total of 9.03 km^{2} (3.49 mi^{2}) or 56.5% is used for agricultural purposes, while 6.12 km^{2} (2.36 mi^{2}) or 38.3% is forested. Of rest of the municipality 0.73 km^{2} (0.28 mi^{2}) or 4.6% is settled (buildings or roads), 0.06 km^{2} (15 acres) or 0.4% is either rivers or lakes and 0.03 km^{2} (7.4 acres) or 0.2% is unproductive land.

From the same survey, housing and buildings made up 3.0% and transportation infrastructure made up 1.4%. A total of 34.1% of the total land area is heavily forested and 4.2% is covered with orchards or small clusters of trees. Of the agricultural land, 7.9% is used for growing crops and 46.8% is pasturage, while 1.7% is used for orchards or vine crops. All the water in the municipality is flowing water.

The municipality is located in the Emmental. It consists of the northern half of the village of Trachselwald, while the southern half is in Lützelflüh municipality.

On 31 December 2009 Amtsbezirk Trachselwald, the municipality's former district, was dissolved. On the following day, 1 January 2010, it joined the newly created Verwaltungskreis Emmental.

== Coat of arms ==
The blazon of the municipal coat of arms is Gules a Fir Tree Vert trunked and eradicated Or and in chief dexter a Mullet of the same.

== Demographics ==
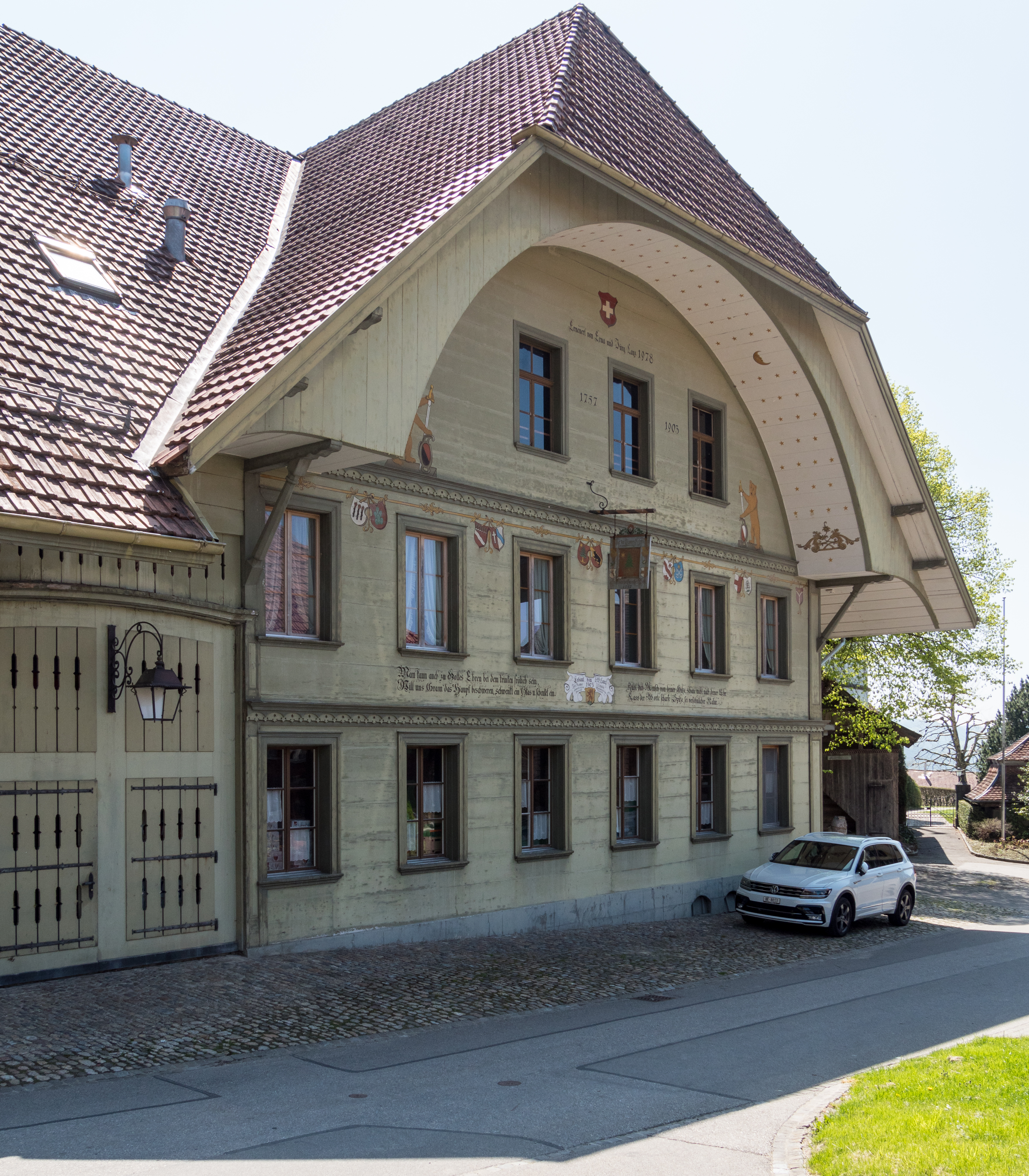
Painted Gasthaus Tanne‚ originally built in 1757

Trachselwald has a population (as of December 2020) of 954. As of 2012, 3.7% of the population are resident foreign nationals. Between the last 2 years (2010-2012) the population changed at a rate of -4.1%. Migration accounted for -2.0%, while births and deaths accounted for 0.8%.

Most of the population (as of 2000) speaks German (1,086 or 98.7%) as their first language, French and Italian both have only 2 speakers in the municipality.

As of 2013, the population was 52.0% male and 48.0% female. The population was made up of 488 Swiss men (49.8% of the population) and 21 (2.1%) non-Swiss men. There were 454 Swiss women (46.4%) and 16 (1.6%) non-Swiss women. Of the population in the municipality, 521 or about 47.4% were born in Trachselwald and lived there in 2000. There were 436 or 39.6% who were born in the same canton, while 91 or 8.3% were born somewhere else in Switzerland, and 26 or 2.4% were born outside of Switzerland.

As of 2012, children and teenagers (0–19 years old) make up 23.3% of the population, while adults (20–64 years old) make up 58.6% and seniors (over 64 years old) make up 18.1%.

As of 2000, there were 498 people who were single and never married in the municipality. There were 500 married individuals, 67 widows or widowers and 35 individuals who are divorced.

As of 2010, there were 99 households that consist of only one person and 48 households with five or more people. In 2000, a total of 355 apartments (87.7% of the total) were permanently occupied, while 26 apartments (6.4%) were seasonally occupied and 24 apartments (5.9%) were empty. The vacancy rate for the municipality, in 2013, was 2.2%. In 2012, single family homes made up 31.5% of the total housing in the municipality.

The historical population is given in the following chart:

== Economy ==
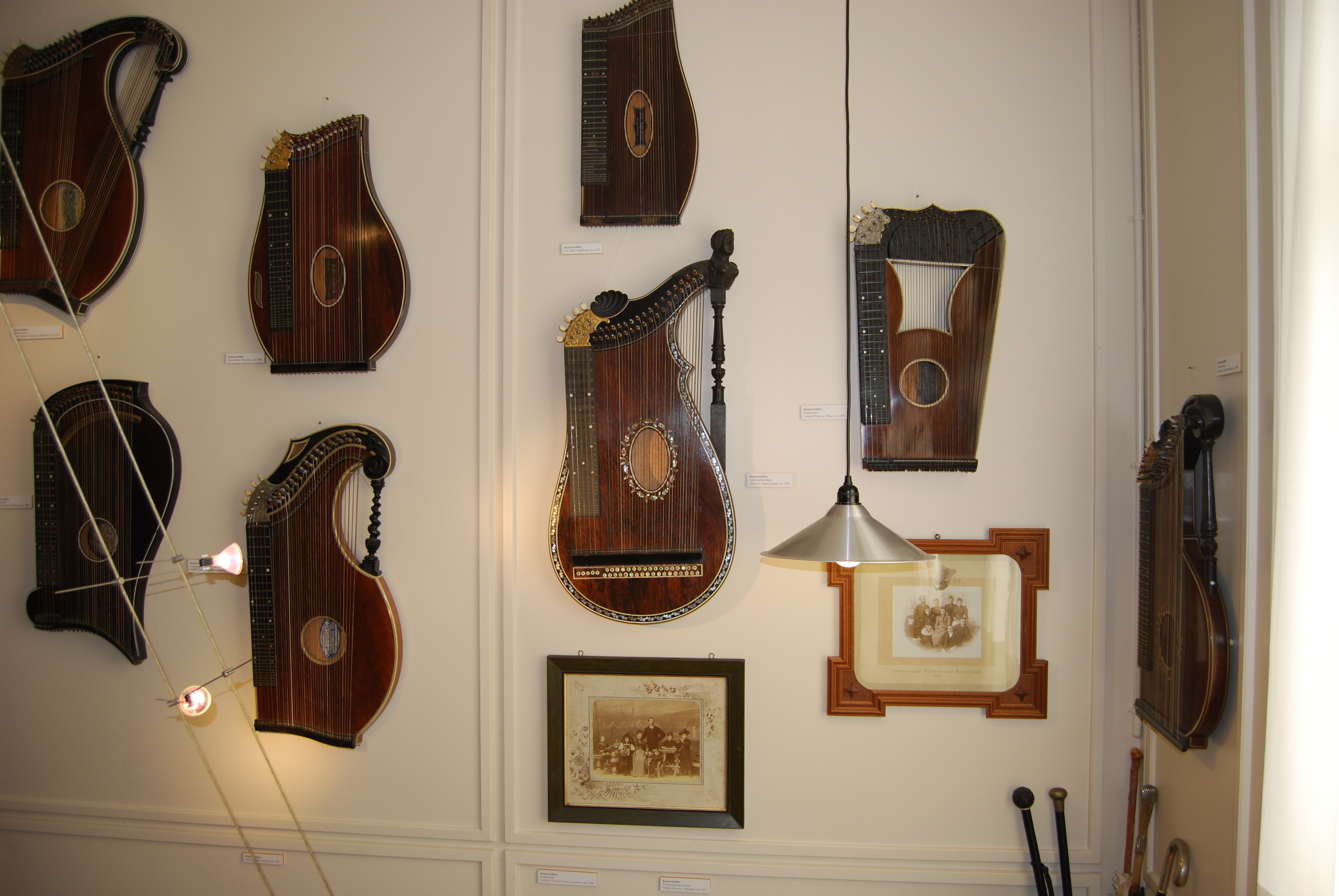
Interior of the Zither culture museum in Trachselwald

As of 2011, Trachselwald had an unemployment rate of 1.37%. As of 2011, there were a total of 370 people employed in the municipality. Of these, there were 197 people employed in the primary economic sector and about 72 businesses involved in this sector. The secondary sector employs 46 people and there were 12 businesses in this sector. The tertiary sector employs 128 people, with 32 businesses in this sector. There were 563 residents of the municipality who were employed in some capacity, of which females made up 38.4% of the workforce.

In 2008 there were a total of 237 full-time equivalent jobs. The number of jobs in the primary sector was 115, all of which were in agriculture. The number of jobs in the secondary sector was 36 of which 24 or (66.7%) were in manufacturing and 12 (33.3%) were in construction. The number of jobs in the tertiary sector was 86. In the tertiary sector; 34 or 39.5% were in wholesale or retail sales or the repair of motor vehicles, 1 was in the movement and storage of goods, 10 or 11.6% were in a hotel or restaurant, 1 was the insurance or financial industry, 1 was a technical professional or scientist, 9 or 10.5% were in education and 11 or 12.8% were in health care.

In 2000, there were 49 workers who commuted into the municipality and 318 workers who commuted away. The municipality is a net exporter of workers, with about 6.5 workers leaving the municipality for every one entering. A total of 245 workers (83.3% of the 294 total workers in the municipality) both lived and worked in Trachselwald. Of the working population, 7.1% used public transportation to get to work, and 52.8% used a private car.

In 2013 the average church, local and cantonal tax rate on a married resident, with two children, of Trachselwald making 150,000 CHF was 12.2%, while an unmarried resident's rate was 18.8%. For comparison, the median rate for all municipalities in the entire canton was 11.7% and 18.1%, while the nationwide median was 10.6% and 17.4% respectively.

In 2011 there were a total of 336 tax payers in the municipality. Of that total, 73 made over 75,000 CHF per year. The greatest number of workers, 74, made between 40,000 and 50,000 CHF per year. The average income of the over 75,000 CHF group in Trachselwald was 104,066 CHF, while the average across all of Switzerland was 136,785 CHF.

In 2011 a total of 3.0% of the population received direct financial assistance from the government.

== Heritage sites of national significance ==
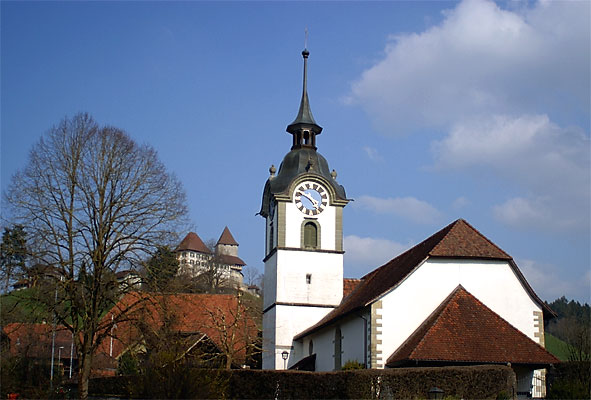
Village church

The village church and Trachselwald Castle are listed as Swiss heritage site of national significance. The entire village of Trachselwald is part of the Inventory of Swiss Heritage Sites, though it is shared between Lützelflüh and Trachselwald municipalities.

The baroque church in the village was designed by Abraham Dünz in 1685. The oldest parts of the castle were built in the 12th century; nowadays it is the governor's seat of the district of Trachselwald. A Zither culture museum, which was founded in 1999 and first located in Konolfingen has been in Trachselwald since March 2003.

== Politics ==
In the 2011 federal election the most popular party was the Swiss People's Party (SVP) which received 47.4% of the vote. The next three most popular parties were the Conservative Democratic Party (BDP) (17.6%), the Social Democratic Party (SP) (9.9%) and the Green Party (6.3%). In the federal election, a total of 384 votes were cast, and the voter turnout was 47.4%.

== Religion ==
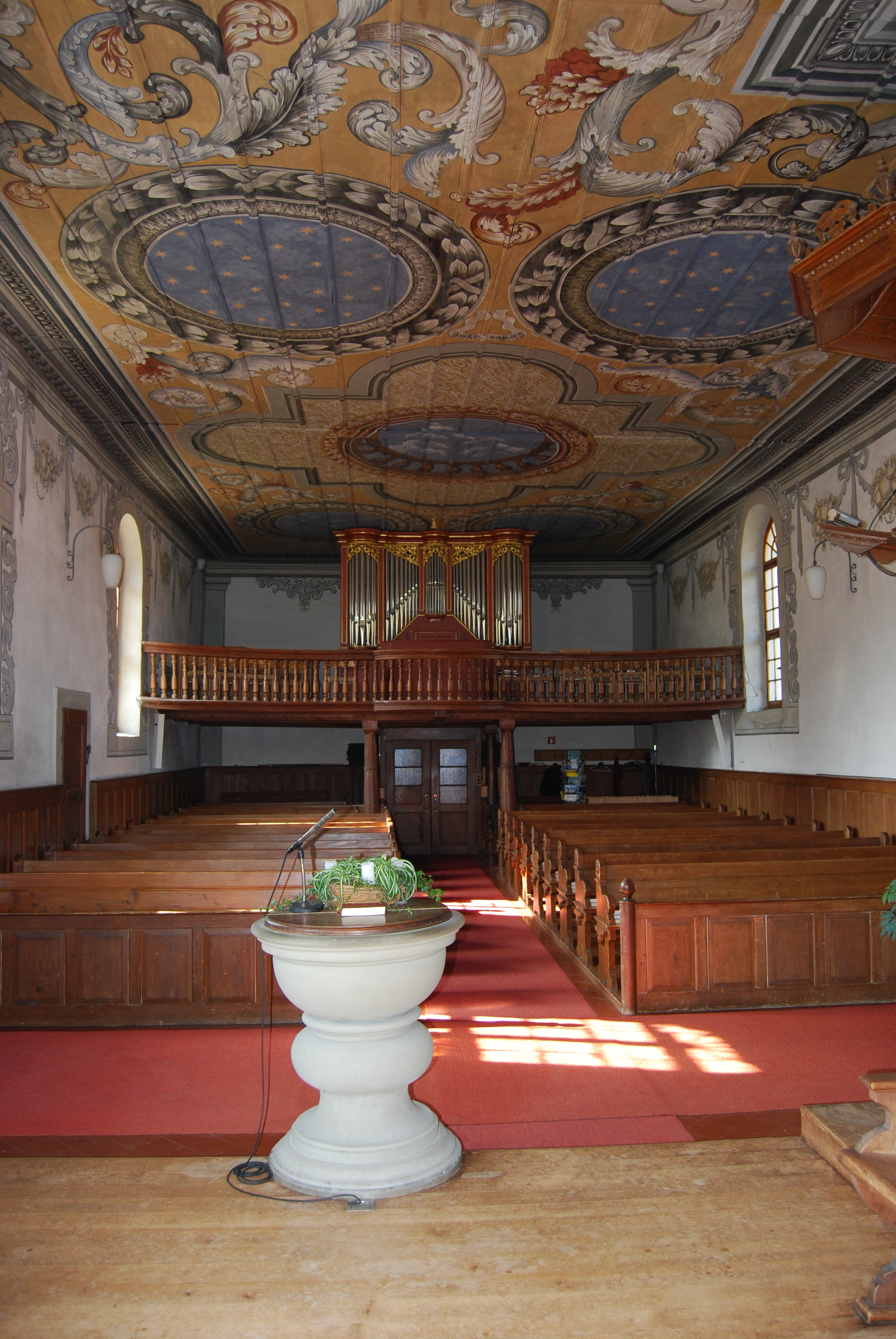
Interior of Trachselwald village church

From the 2000 census, 975 or 88.6% belonged to the Swiss Reformed Church, while 25 or 2.3% were Roman Catholic. Of the rest of the population, there was 1 member of an Orthodox church, and there were 35 individuals (or about 3.18% of the population) who belonged to another Christian church. There were 3 (or about 0.27% of the population) who were Muslim. There was 1 person who was Buddhist and 4 individuals who were Hindu. 31 (or about 2.82% of the population) belonged to no church, are agnostic or atheist, and 25 individuals (or about 2.27% of the population) did not answer the question.

== Education ==
In Trachselwald about 57.7% of the population have completed non-mandatory upper secondary education, and 13.9% have completed additional higher education (either university or a Fachhochschule). Of the 81 who had completed some form of tertiary schooling listed in the census, 60.5% were Swiss men, 32.1% were Swiss women, 7.4% were non-Swiss men.

The Canton of Bern school system provides one year of non-obligatory Kindergarten, followed by six years of Primary school. This is followed by three years of obligatory lower Secondary school where the students are separated according to ability and aptitude. Following the lower Secondary students may attend additional schooling or they may enter an apprenticeship.

During the 2012–13 school year, there were a total of 95 students attending classes in Trachselwald. There were a total of 19 students in the German language kindergarten classes in the municipality. Of the kindergarten students, 10.5% were permanent or temporary residents of Switzerland (not citizens) and 5.3% have a different mother language than the classroom language. The municipality's primary school had 55 students in German language classes. Of the primary students, 7.3% were permanent or temporary residents of Switzerland (not citizens) and 1.8% have a different mother language than the classroom language. During the same year, the lower secondary schools in neighboring municipalities had a total of 21 students from Trachselwald.

As of 2000, there were a total of 128 students attending any school in the municipality. Of those, 118 both lived and attended school in the municipality, while 10 students came from another municipality. During the same year, 71 residents attended schools outside the municipality.

== Notable people ==
- Gottlieb Sigmund Gruner (1717–1778), cartographer and geologist; the author of the first connected attempt to describe in detail the snowy mountains of Switzerland.
- Leah Hirsig (1883–1975) a Swiss-American woman notably associated with the author and occultist Aleister Crowley.
