= Lützelflüh =

- Municipality
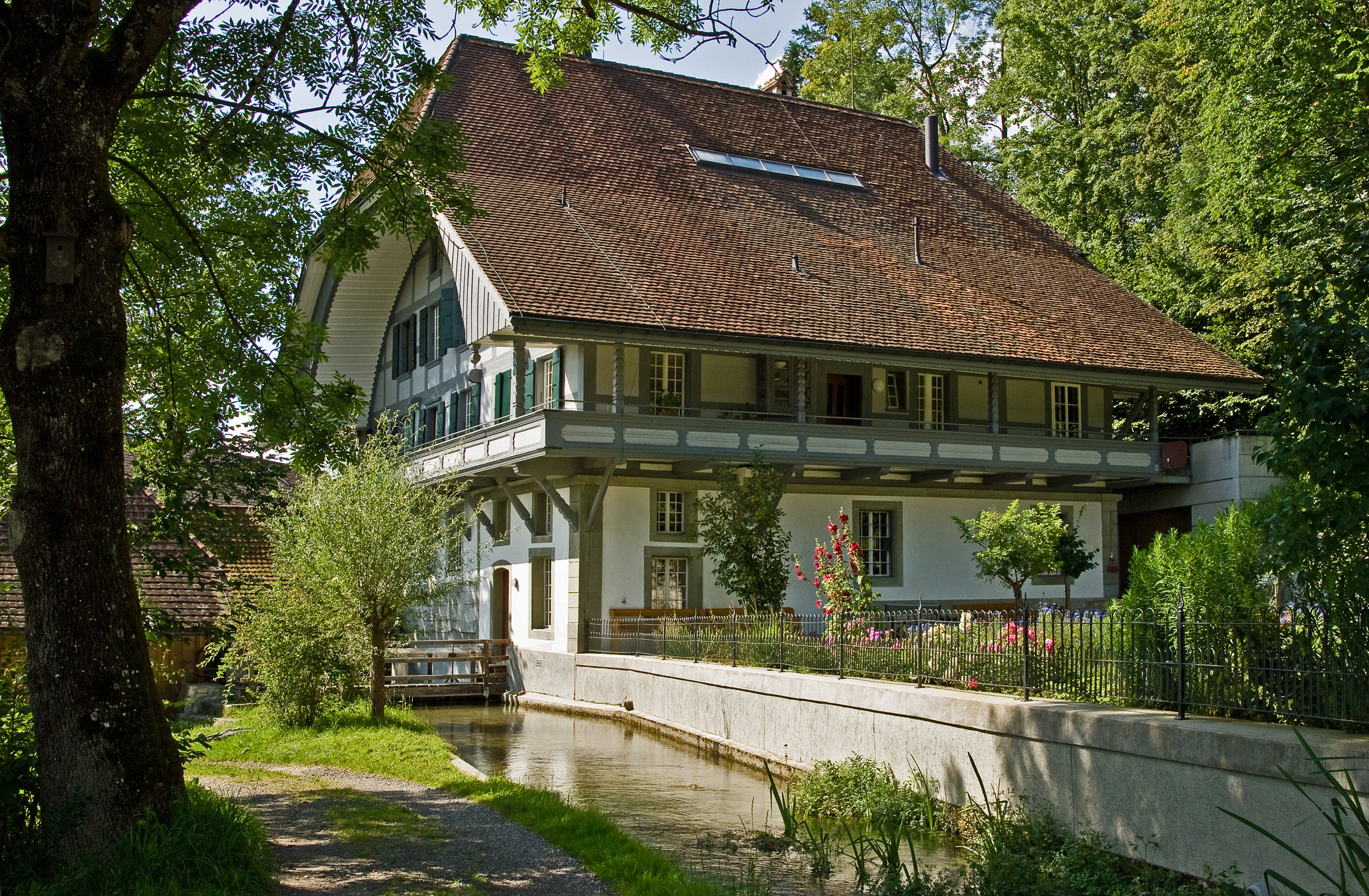
- The Kulturmühle in Lützelflüh village

- Flag Coat of arms
- Location of Lützelflüh
- Location within Switzerland Location within Canton of Bern
- Coordinates: 47°0′N 7°41′E
- Country: Switzerland
- Canton: Bern
- District: Emmental

Government
  - Executive: Gemeinderat with 7 members
  - Mayor: Gemeindepräsident(in); Kurt Baumann (as of 2026)

Area
  - Total: 26.9 km^{2} (10.4 sq mi)
- Elevation: 585 m (1,919 ft)

Population (December 2020)
  - Total: 4,211
  - Density: 157/km^{2} (405/sq mi)
- Time zone: UTC+01:00 (CET)
  - Summer (DST): UTC+02:00 (CEST)
- Postal code: 3432
- SFOS number: 955
- ISO 3166 code: CH-BE
- Surrounded by: Hasle bei Burgdorf, Krauchthal, Landiswil, Oberburg, Rüderswil, Rüegsau, Sumiswald, Trachselwald, Walkringen
- Website: www.luetzelflueh.ch

Lützelflüh is a municipality in the administrative district of Emmental in the Swiss canton of Bern.

== History ==
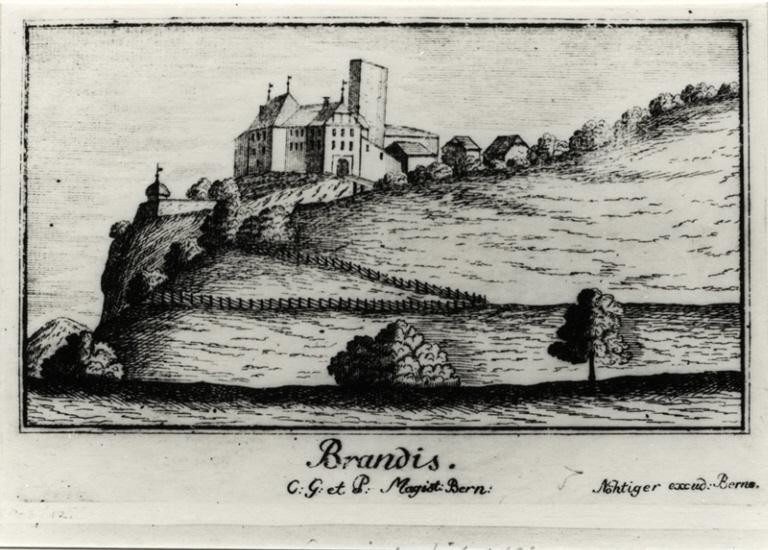
Brandis Castle in 1743, before it was destroyed in a fire

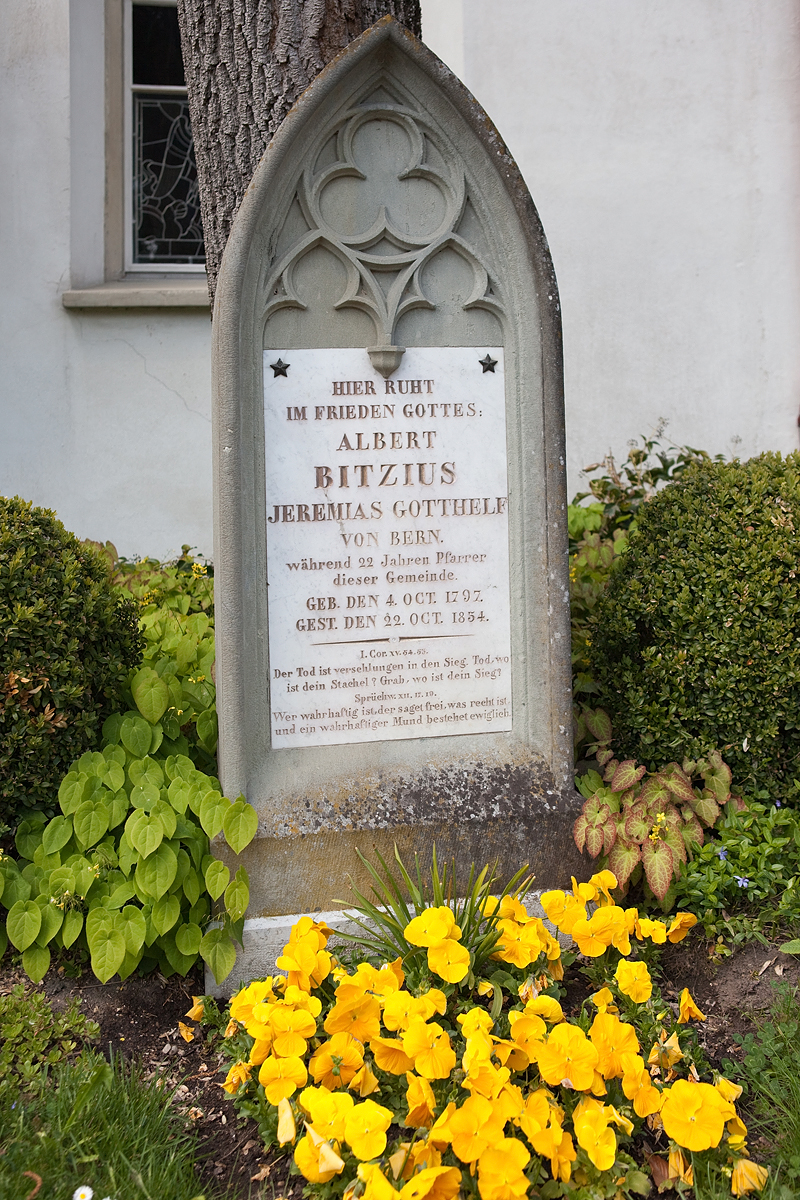
Albert Bitzius or Jeremias Gotthelf's grave in Lützelflüh

Lützelflüh is first mentioned in 1225 as Lucelfluo.

The area around Lützelflüh was probably inhabited during the Roman era. However, only a single hoard of coins has been discovered, near the ruins of Brandis Castle. By the High Middle Ages Lützelflüh and the surrounding area were home to several earthen strongholds, a weir in the river valley and Brandis Castle, built around 1230. The Freiherr von Lützelflüh helped found Trub Abbey in 1125-1130, but nothing is known about the family's origin or the extent of their lands. The town of Lützelflüh developed out of this barons' seat. In 1230 the Freiherr of Brandis took the place of those of Lützelflüh and built themselves a castle between Lützelflüh and Rüegsau.

In 1450, the Brandis' castle was sold to the nobility of Bern. It was then sold and inherited several times until it ended up in the hand of the city of Bern in 1607. The town then became a bailiwick of Bern. The last bailiff was Franz Ludwig May.

On 14 April 1798, the castle burnt down and this was the end of the bailiwick of Brandis. The municipality Lützelflüh became part of the district Trachselwald.

In 1881 the Emmental railroad was built through the village, encouraging industry to settle in the municipality. A few years later, in 1886, the Emme river correction project reduced the risk of floods, built a major road through the valley and opened up additional farmland in Lützelflüh. The railroad and new Emmental road helped transform the village into a local industrial center. In 1898 an oat and barley mill opened, followed by metal and flooring factories as well as several cheese exporting firms. A civil defense training center also opened in the municipality.

In 1831 the famous Swiss novelist Albert Bitzius, better known as Jeremias Gotthelf, settled in Lützelflüh as an assistant pastor. He later became the parish priest and spent the remainder of his life in the municipality. Bitzius is buried in the local cemetery and a small Gotthelf museum opened in the village.

In 1879 Lützelflüh and Goldbach built a secondary school.

== Geography ==
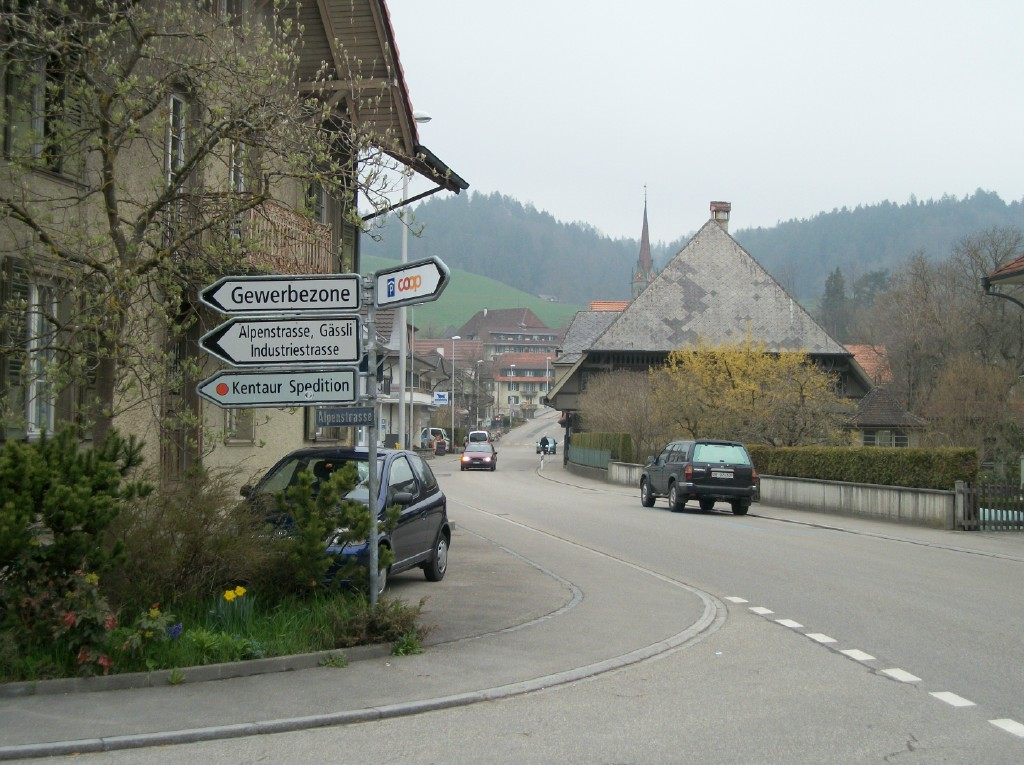
Goldbach village in Lützelflüh

Aerial view by Walter Mittelholzer (1922)

Lützelflüh has an area of 26.87 km^{2} (10.37 sq mi). As of the 2004/06 survey, a total of 17.6 km^{2} (6.8 mi^{2}) or 65.4% is used for agricultural purposes, while 6.64 km^{2} (2.56 mi^{2}) or 24.7% is forested. Of rest of the municipality 2.45 km^{2} (0.95 mi^{2}) or 9.1% is settled (buildings or roads), 0.19 km^{2} (0.073 mi^{2}) or 0.7% is either rivers or lakes and 0.02 km^{2} (4.9 acres) or 0.1% is unproductive land.

From the same survey, housing and buildings made up 4.2% and transportation infrastructure made up 3.3%. A total of 22.9% of the total land area is heavily forested and 1.7% is covered with orchards or small clusters of trees. Of the agricultural land, 26.0% is used for growing crops and 37.2% is pasturage, while 2.2% is used for orchards or vine crops. All the water in the municipality is flowing water.

Lützelflüh lies in the lower Emmental, right on the Emme between Langnau and Burgdorf. The Emme divides the village into the older part on the right shore and the younger part on the left shore. The exclaves Lauterbach and Oberried also belong to the municipality. The municipality is neighbored by Rüegsau, Sumiswald, Trachselwald, Rüderswil, and Hasle bei Burgdorf.

It consists of the villages of Lützelflüh, Ramsei and Grünenmatt, parts of the villages of Trachselwald, Goldbach and Ranflüh and the hamlets of Waldhus and Flüele and the exclaves of Oberried and Lauterbach.

On 31 December 2009 Amtsbezirk Trachselwald, the municipality's former district, was dissolved. On the following day, 1 January 2010, it joined the newly created Verwaltungskreis Emmental.

== Coat of arms ==
The blazon of the municipal coat of arms is Gules a Bend wavy Argent and in a Chief of the first six Fir Trees Vert issuant from as many Mounts of the second.

== Demographics ==
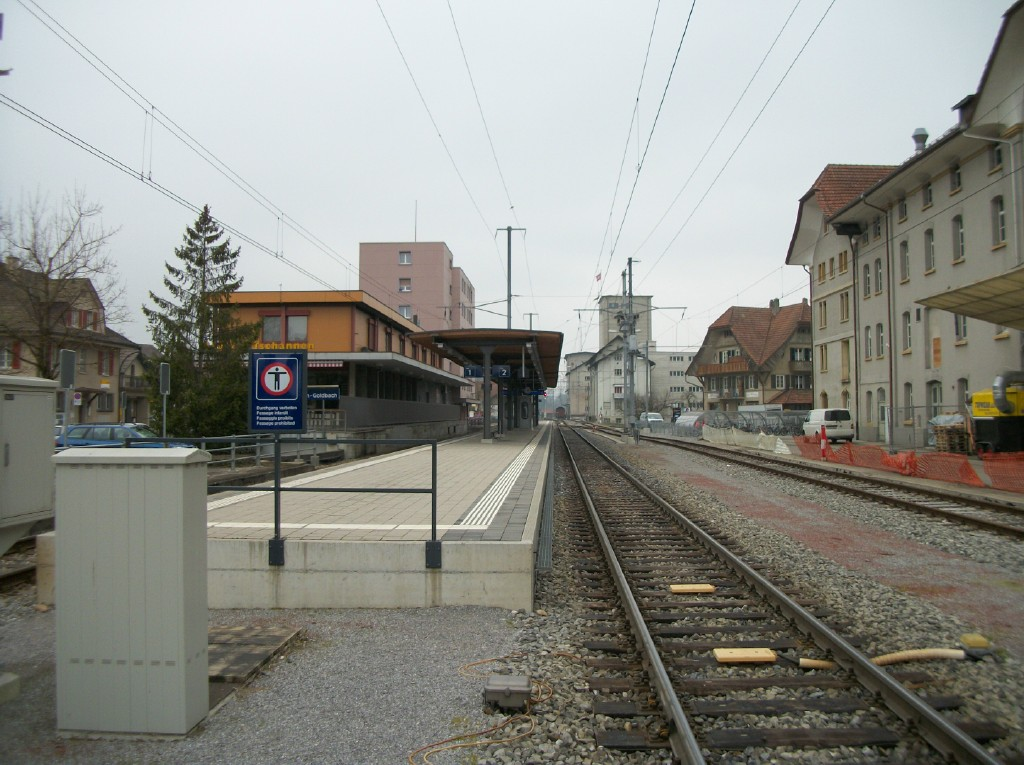
Lützelflüh-Goldbach rail station and village

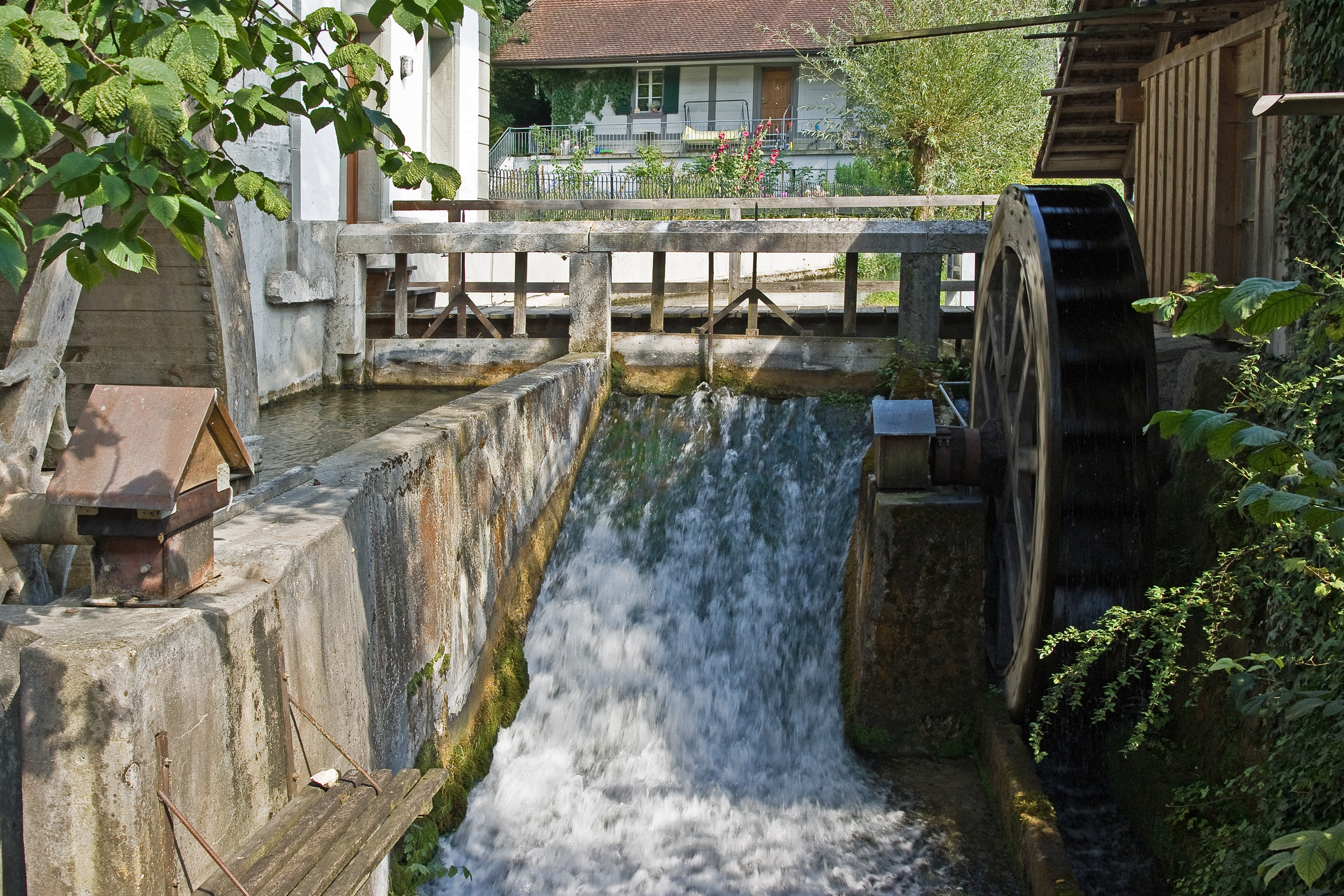
The Kulturmuehle spillway and nearby farm houses. The mill was in operation until the 1970s but today hosts concerts and events

Lützelflüh has a population (as of December 2020) of 4,211. As of 2012, 5.1% of the population are resident foreign nationals. Between the last 2 years (2010-2012) the population changed at a rate of -0.2%. Migration accounted for -0.7%, while births and deaths accounted for -0.3%.

Most of the population (as of 2000) speaks German (3,805 or 96.2%) as their first language, Italian is the second most common (35 or 0.9%) and Albanian is the third (31 or 0.8%). There are 14 people who speak French and 2 people who speak Romansh.

As of 2013, the population was 48.8% male and 51.2% female. The population was made up of 1,868 Swiss men (45.8% of the population) and 121 (3.0%) non-Swiss men. There were 1,991 Swiss women (48.8%) and 99 (2.4%) non-Swiss women. Of the population in the municipality, 1,408 or about 35.6% were born in Lützelflüh and lived there in 2000. There were 1,824 or 46.1% who were born in the same canton, while 366 or 9.2% were born somewhere else in Switzerland, and 243 or 6.1% were born outside of Switzerland.

As of 2012, children and teenagers (0–19 years old) make up 21.6% of the population, while adults (20–64 years old) make up 59.9% and seniors (over 64 years old) make up 18.5%.

As of 2000, there were 1,663 people who were single and never married in the municipality. There were 1,910 married individuals, 263 widows or widowers and 121 individuals who are divorced.

As of 2010, there were 543 households that consist of only one person and 138 households with five or more people. In 2000, a total of 1,488 apartments (86.4% of the total) were permanently occupied, while 165 apartments (9.6%) were seasonally occupied and 69 apartments (4.0%) were empty. As of 2012, the construction rate of new housing units was 7.2 new units per 1000 residents. The vacancy rate for the municipality, in 2013, was 1.4%. In 2012, single family homes made up 42.2% of the total housing in the municipality.

The historical population is given in the following chart:

== Economy ==
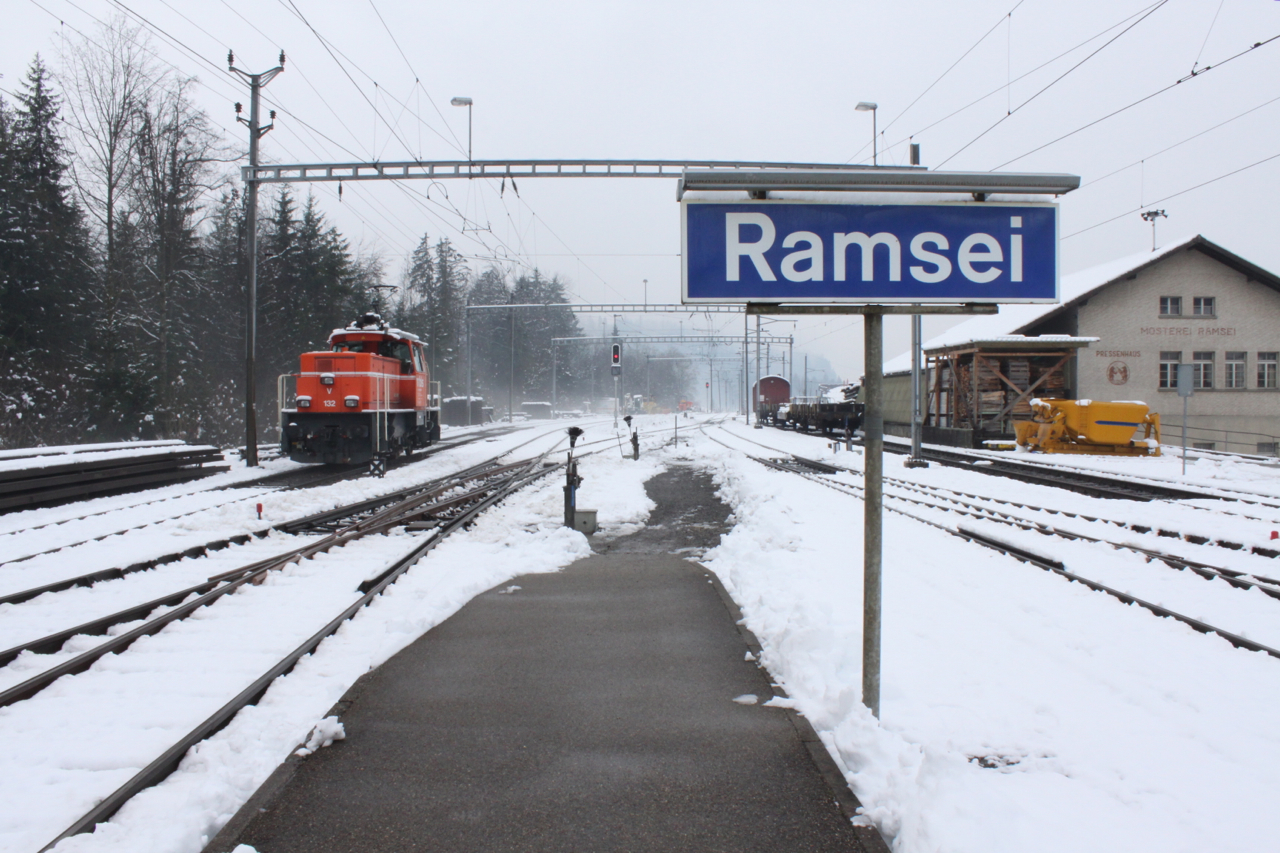
Ramsei village train station, one of two in the municipality

As of 2011, Lützelflüh had an unemployment rate of 2.24%. As of 2011, there were a total of 1,674 people employed in the municipality. Of these, there were 366 people employed in the primary economic sector and about 127 businesses involved in this sector. The secondary sector employs 572 people and there were 56 businesses in this sector. The tertiary sector employs 736 people, with 173 businesses in this sector. There were 2,072 residents of the municipality who were employed in some capacity, of which females made up 43.5% of the workforce.

In 2008 there were a total of 1,216 full-time equivalent jobs. The number of jobs in the primary sector was 249, of which 246 were in agriculture and 3 were in forestry or lumber production. The number of jobs in the secondary sector was 513 of which 242 or (47.2%) were in manufacturing, 8 or (1.6%) were in mining and 264 (51.5%) were in construction. The number of jobs in the tertiary sector was 454. In the tertiary sector; 118 or 26.0% were in wholesale or retail sales or the repair of motor vehicles, 46 or 10.1% were in the movement and storage of goods, 49 or 10.8% were in a hotel or restaurant, 13 or 2.9% were the insurance or financial industry, 28 or 6.2% were technical professionals or scientists, 44 or 9.7% were in education and 71 or 15.6% were in health care.

In 2000, there were 620 workers who commuted into the municipality and 1,262 workers who commuted away. The municipality is a net exporter of workers, with about 2.0 workers leaving the municipality for every one entering. A total of 809 workers (56.6% of the 1,429 total workers in the municipality) both lived and worked in Lützelflüh. Of the working population, 13.1% used public transportation to get to work, and 52.7% used a private car.

In 2013 the average church, local and cantonal tax rate on a married resident, with two children, of Lützelflüh making 150,000 CHF was 12.0%, while an unmarried resident's rate was 18.5%. For comparison, the median rate for all municipalities in the entire canton was 11.7% and 18.1%, while the nationwide median was 10.6% and 17.4% respectively.

In 2011 there were a total of 1,500 tax payers in the municipality. Of that total, 379 made over 75,000 CHF per year. There were 10 people who made between 15,000 and 20,000 per year. The average income of the over 75,000 CHF group in Lützelflüh was 110,188 CHF, while the average across all of Switzerland was 136,785 CHF.

In 2011 a total of 4.5% of the population received direct financial assistance from the government.

== Heritage sites of national significance ==
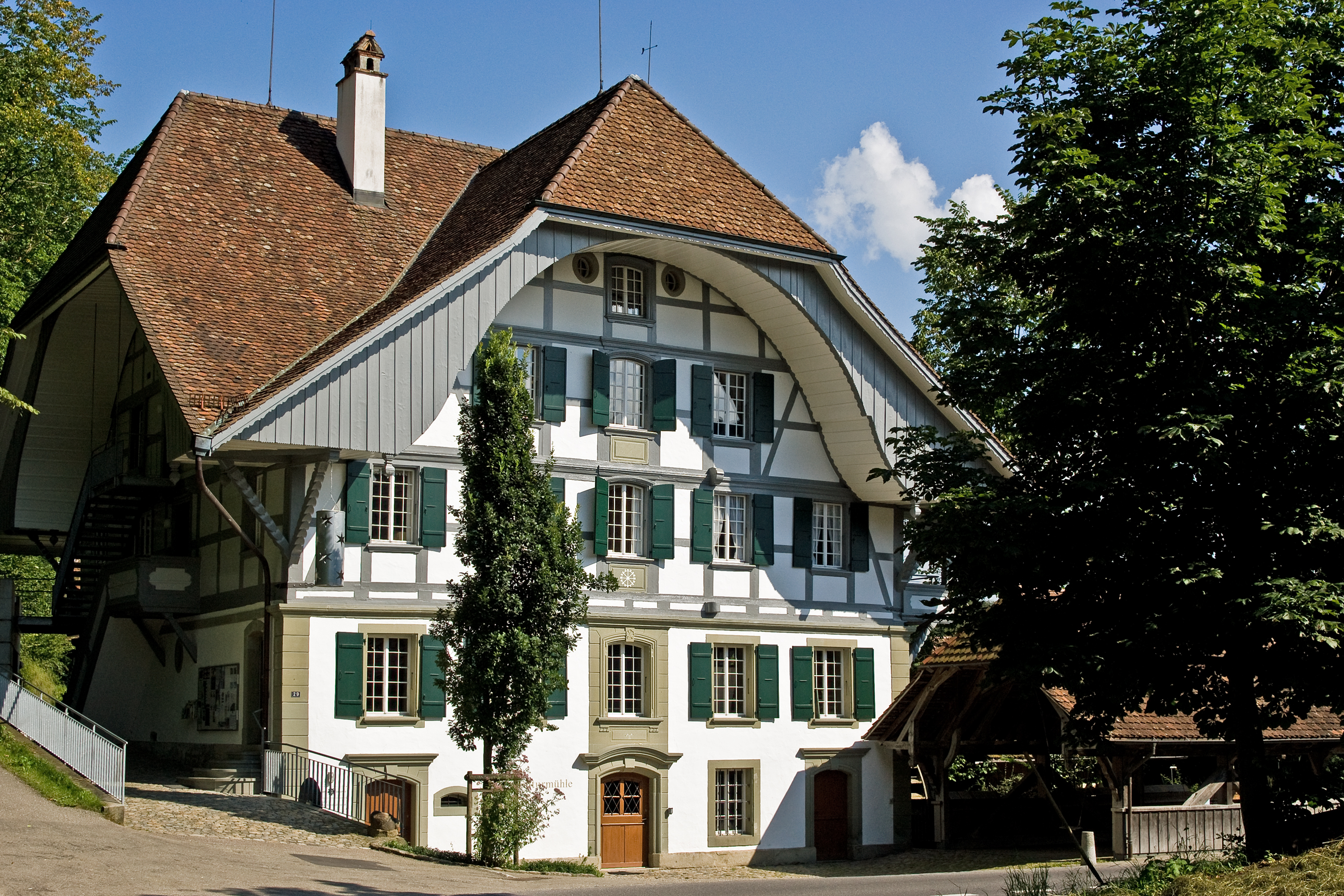
Former mill at Mühlegasse 29

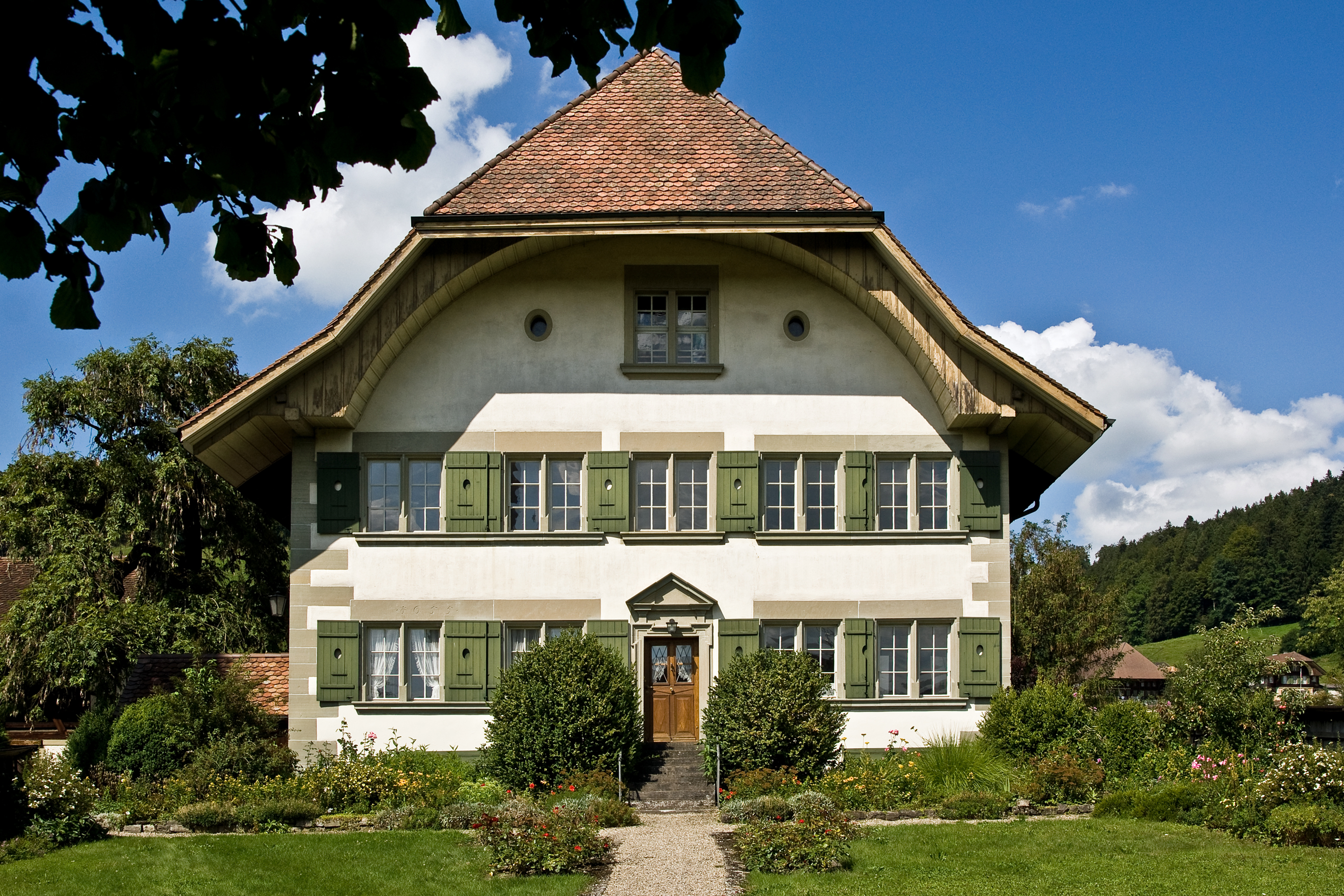
Rectory at Rainbergliweg 2

The former mill at Mühlegasse 29 (now known as the Kulturmühle and used for concerts and events) and the rectory at Rainbergliweg 2 are listed as Swiss heritage site of national significance. The entire villages of Lützelflüh and Trachselwald and the hamlets of Flüelen, Schufelbüel and Waldhaus are part of the Inventory of Swiss Heritage Sites.

=== Main sights ===
- The church of Lützelflüh was built in 1505 and renovated in 1962. The graves of the 3 poets of Lützelflüh: Jeremias Gotthelf, Simon Gfeller and Emanuel Friedli are located on the south side of the church.
- The Gotthelf-Museum named after the poet is located near the church.

== Politics ==
In the 2011 federal election the most popular party was the Swiss People's Party (SVP) which received 41.9% of the vote. The next three most popular parties were the Conservative Democratic Party (BDP) (17.0%), the Social Democratic Party (SP) (10.9%) and the Evangelical People's Party (EVP) (7.0%). In the federal election, a total of 1,503 votes were cast, and the voter turnout was 47.7%.

== Religion ==
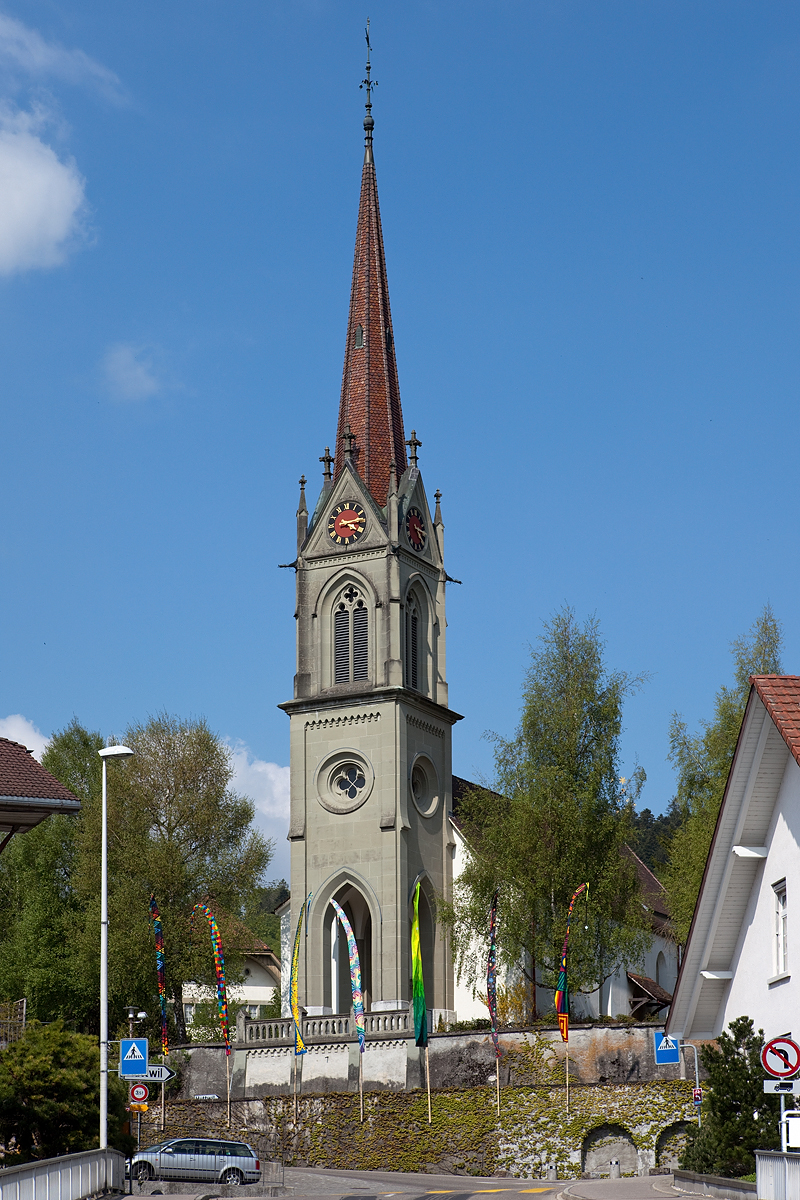
Lützelflüh Swiss Reformed church, where the novelist Jeremias Gotthelf worked

From the 2000 census, 3,249 or 82.1% belonged to the Swiss Reformed Church, while 215 or 5.4% were Roman Catholic. Of the rest of the population, there were 12 members of an Orthodox church (or about 0.30% of the population), there was 1 individual who belongs to the Christian Catholic Church, and there were 127 individuals (or about 3.21% of the population) who belonged to another Christian church. There were 42 (or about 1.06% of the population) who were Muslim. There were 4 individuals who were Buddhist, 50 individuals who were Hindu and 2 individuals who belonged to another church. 150 (or about 3.79% of the population) belonged to no church, are agnostic or atheist, and 105 individuals (or about 2.65% of the population) did not answer the question.

== Education ==
In Lützelflüh about 57.5% of the population have completed non-mandatory upper secondary education, and 15.3% have completed additional higher education (either university or a Fachhochschule). Of the 361 who had completed some form of tertiary schooling listed in the census, 74.0% were Swiss men, 23.0% were Swiss women, 1.4% were non-Swiss men and 1.7% were non-Swiss women.

The Canton of Bern school system provides one year of non-obligatory Kindergarten, followed by six years of Primary school. This is followed by three years of obligatory lower Secondary school where the students are separated according to ability and aptitude. Following the lower Secondary students may attend additional schooling or they may enter an apprenticeship.

During the 2012-13 school year, there were a total of 444 students attending classes in Lützelflüh. There were a total of 57 students in the German language kindergarten classes in the municipality. Of the kindergarten students, 10.5% were permanent or temporary residents of Switzerland (not citizens) and 8.8% have a different mother language than the classroom language. The municipality's primary school had 243 students in German language classes. Of the primary students, 3.7% were permanent or temporary residents of Switzerland (not citizens) and 5.3% have a different mother language than the classroom language. During the same year, the lower secondary school had a total of 144 students. There were 5.6% who were permanent or temporary residents of Switzerland (not citizens) and 6.3% have a different mother language than the classroom language.

As of 2000, there were a total of 390 students attending any school in the municipality. Of those, 296 both lived and attended school in the municipality, while 94 students came from another municipality. During the same year, 305 residents attended schools outside the municipality.

== Tourism ==
Tourism in Lützelflüh is small but not unimportant. Several inns typical for the region offer rooms and it is also possible to vacation in the local farms.
