= Sumiswald =

Municipality in Bern, Switzerland

- Municipality
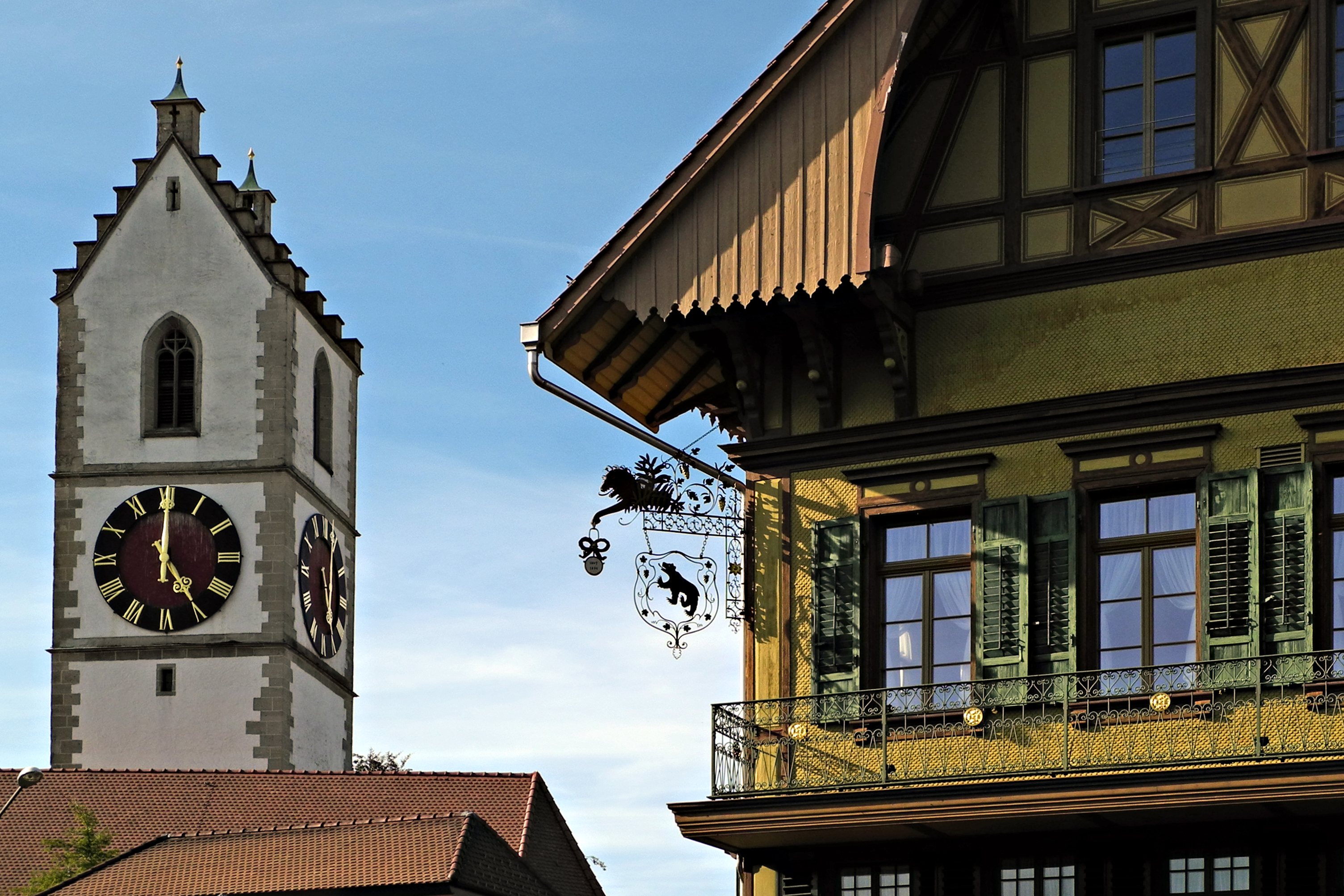

- Flag Coat of arms
- Location of Sumiswald
- Location within Switzerland Location within Canton of Bern
- Coordinates: 47°2′N 7°43′E
- Country: Switzerland
- Canton: Bern
- District: Emmental

Government
  - Executive: Gemeinderat with 7 members
  - Mayor: Gemeindepräsident(in); Martin Friedli (as of 2026)

Area
  - Total: 59.4 km^{2} (22.9 sq mi)
- Elevation: 702 m (2,303 ft)

Population (December 2020)
  - Total: 5,044
  - Density: 84.9/km^{2} (220/sq mi)
- Time zone: UTC+01:00 (CET)
  - Summer (DST): UTC+02:00 (CEST)
- Postal code: 3454
- SFOS number: 957
- ISO 3166 code: CH-BE
- Surrounded by: Affoltern im Emmental, Dürrenroth, Eriswil, Langnau im Emmental, Luthern (LU), Lützelflüh, Rüegsau, Trachselwald, Trub, Wyssachen
- Website: www.sumiswald.ch

Sumiswald is a municipality in the district of the Emmental administrative district in the canton of Bern, Switzerland. It is mostly known for being the manufacturing location of the Swiss railway clock.

== History ==
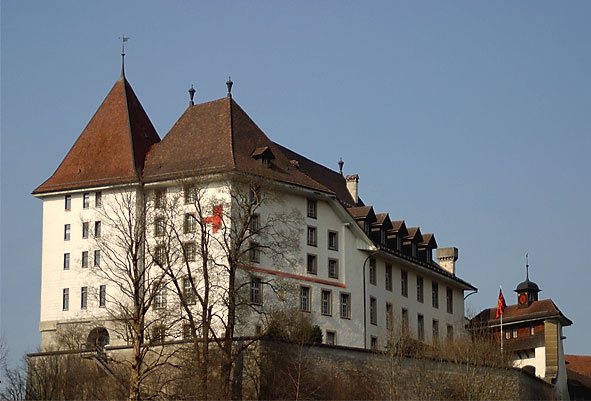
Sumiswald Castle, former home of Teutonic Knights' commandery

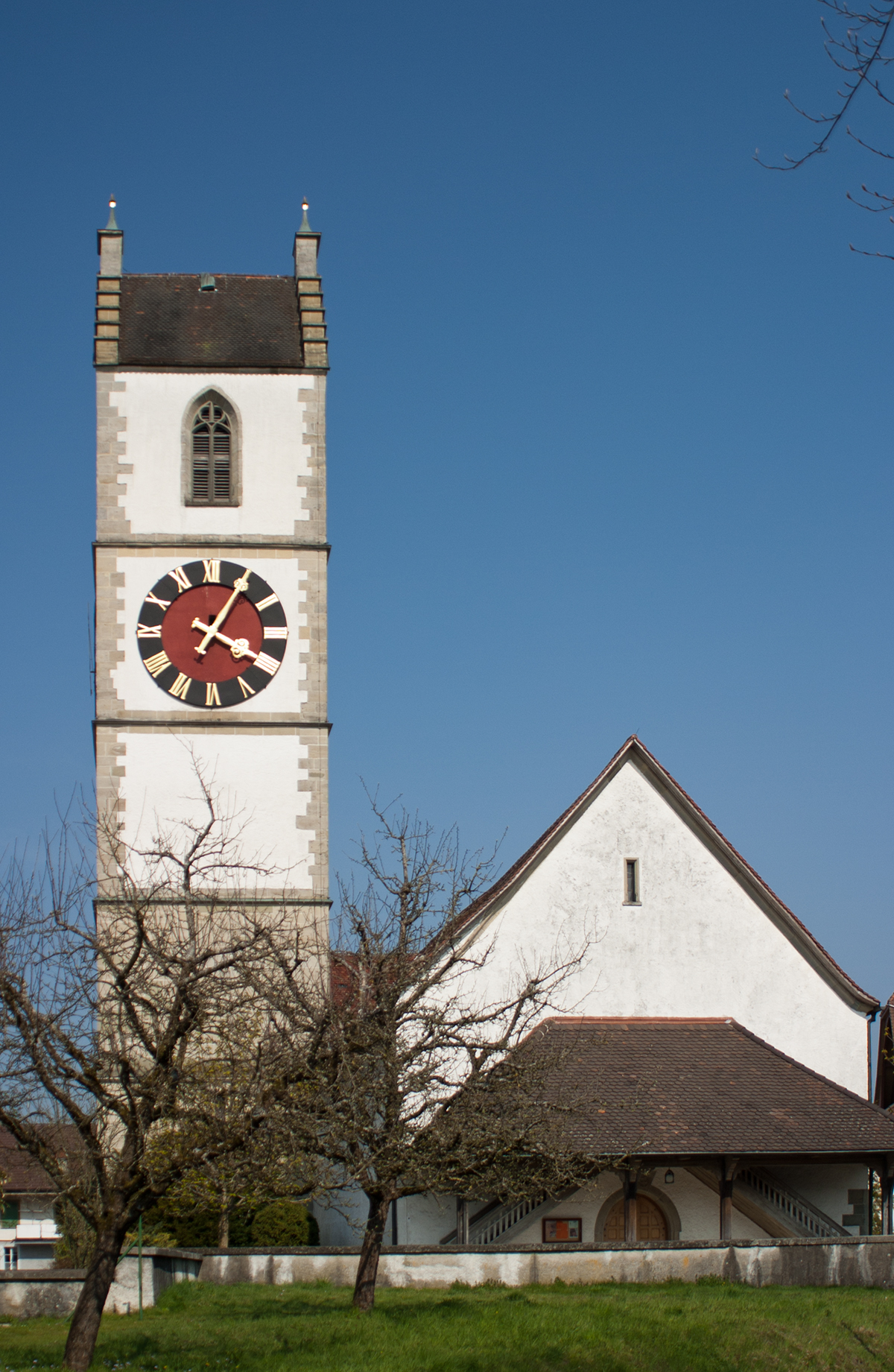
Sumiswald village church, built in 1510-12

Aerial view from 400 m by Walter Mittelholzer (1922)

Sumiswald is first mentioned in 1225 as Smoldeswalt. The name either comes from the Germanic settler "Suomolt" or the Latin term summa vallis ("bank over the valley").

The von Sumiswald family is first mentioned in 1135. They probably took their name from a now vanished castle in the area. The last member of the family, Lütold, donated the village, land and churches in Sumiswald and Escholzmatt to the commandery of the Teutonic Knights of the "Ballei" Swabia-Alsace-Burgundy. In 1525, the town bought its way out of serfdom, but stayed a part of the Teutonic Knights even after the Protestant Reformation was introduced in 1528; Sumiswald was sold to the city of Bern for 36,000 Reichs thaler in 1698.

The village Church of St. Mary was first mentioned in 1225 along with the village. The old church was replaced with a new building between 1510 and 1512. When Bern converted to Protestantism, the village converted and the municipality acquired the patronage rights over the church.

Hans Haslibacher, who was decapitated on October 20, 1571 in Bern because of his Anabaptist conviction came from Sumiswald; his decapitation was the last execution of an Anabaptist in Bern.

The village was surrounded by a number of alpine meadows and seasonal alpine herding was an important part of the local economy. The first contracts governing ownership and access to the meadows are from 1498. In the following century many of the high forests were cleared to provide additional meadows for grazing. In 1572 the municipality passed laws to limit further clearing to prevent total deforestation. The settlements of Wasen, Ey and Grünen all developed out of small seasonal herding camps. In the following centuries ownership of the fields in the valley and the alpine meadows became firmly entrenched, creating a class of wealthy landowners and a class of poor artisans, day laborers and sharecroppers. The poor were forced to begin small scale spinning and weaving to supplement their income. By the 18th century, Sumiswald, was a local center of the yarn and cloth trade as well as horse breeding and cheese production. It attempted to become a market town, but other surrounding market towns blocked the attempt five times in the 18th century. Finally in 1801, Sumiswald was granted the right to hold five yearly fairs.

Following the 1798 French invasion, Sumiswald became the capital of the Helvetic Republic district of Unteremmental. After the collapse of the Republic and 1803 Act of Mediation it joined the newly created Trachselwald District. In the 19th century the local yarn and cloth industry declined and was replaced with other industries including manufacturing musical instruments. The construction of the Emmental road in 1875, the Ramsei-Huttwil railroad in 1908 and the Sumiswald-Wasen rail line in 1915 brought new factories and industry to the municipality. Today Sumiswald is a regional cultural and economic center, with workers commuting into the municipality from surrounding villages. There are secondary schools in Sumiswald and Wasen as well as a retirement home.

== Geography ==
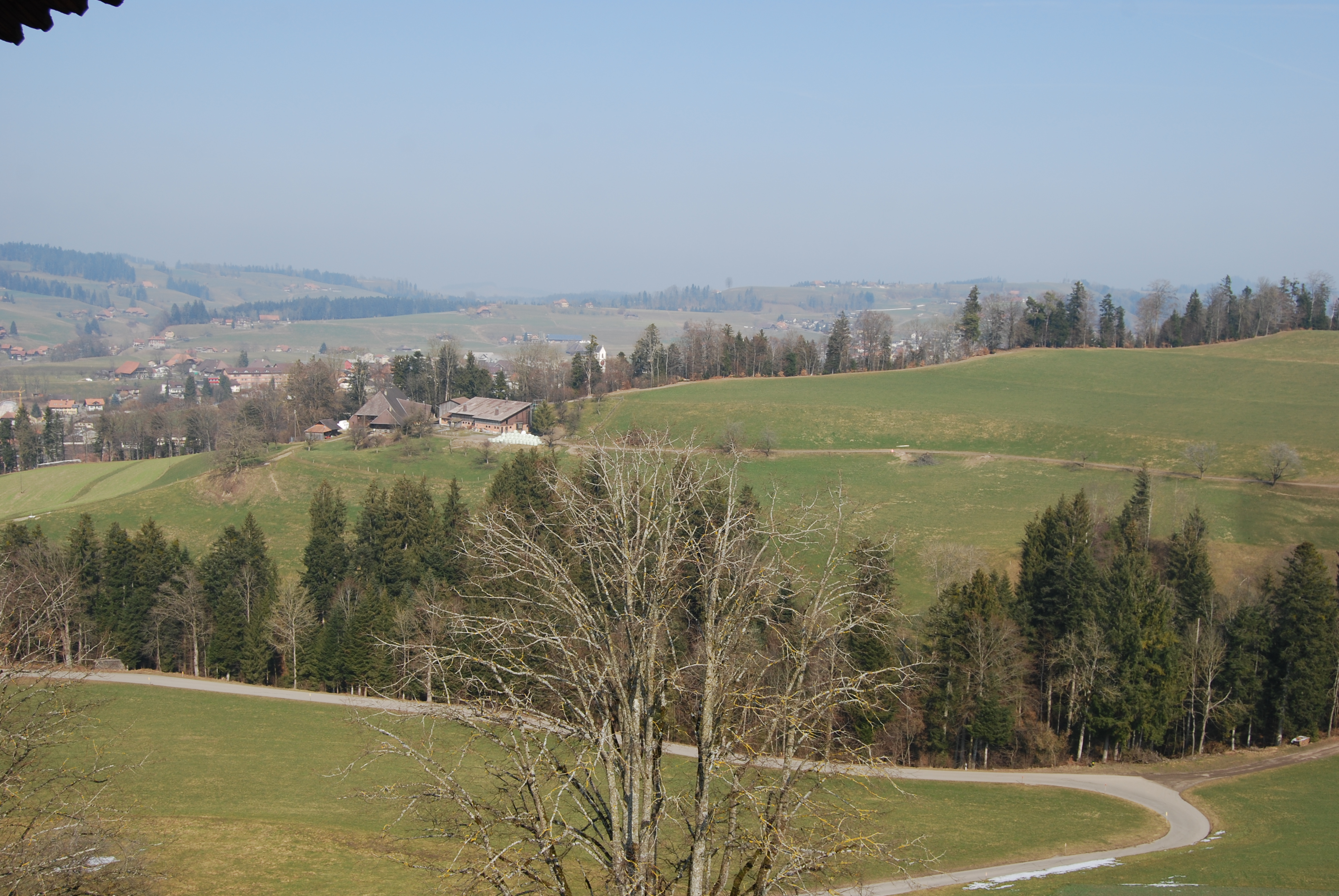
Sumiswald, view from the tower of Castle Trachselwald

Sumiswald consists of three villages (Sumiswald, Grünen and Wasen), two hamlets (Gammenthal and Griesbach) and scattered farm houses and alpine meadows in the lower Emmental. It is one of the largest municipalities in the canton.

Sumiswald has an area of 59.34 km^{2} (22.91 sq mi). As of the 2006 survey, a total of 28.44 km^{2} (10.98 mi^{2}) or 47.9% is used for agricultural purposes, while 27.45 km^{2} (10.60 mi^{2}) or 46.3% is forested. Of rest of the municipality 3.05 km^{2} (1.18 mi^{2}) or 5.1% is settled (buildings or roads), 0.38 km^{2} (0.15 mi^{2}) or 0.6% is either rivers or lakes and 0.06 km^{2} (15 acres) or 0.1% is unproductive land.

From the same survey, housing and buildings made up 2.7% and transportation infrastructure made up 1.7%. A total of 43.4% of the total land area is heavily forested and 2.9% is covered with orchards or small clusters of trees. Of the agricultural land, 11.3% is used for growing crops and 25.0% is pasturage and 10.9% is used for alpine pastures. All the water in the municipality is flowing water.

On 31 December 2009 Amtsbezirk Trachselwald, the municipality's former district, was dissolved. On the following day, 1 January 2010, it joined the newly created Verwaltungskreis Emmental.

== Coat of arms ==
The blazon of the municipal coat of arms is Per pale Argent a Bar Gules and of the last.

== Demographics ==
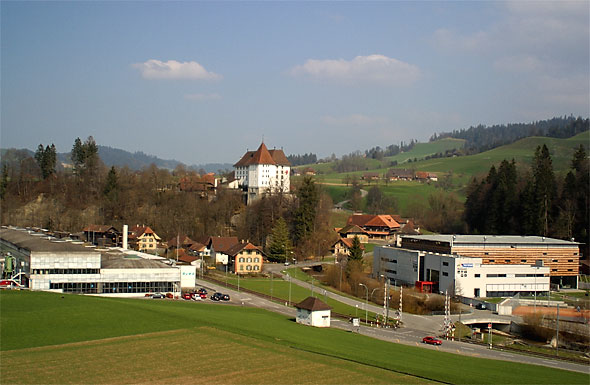
Sumiswald town, industry and the old castle

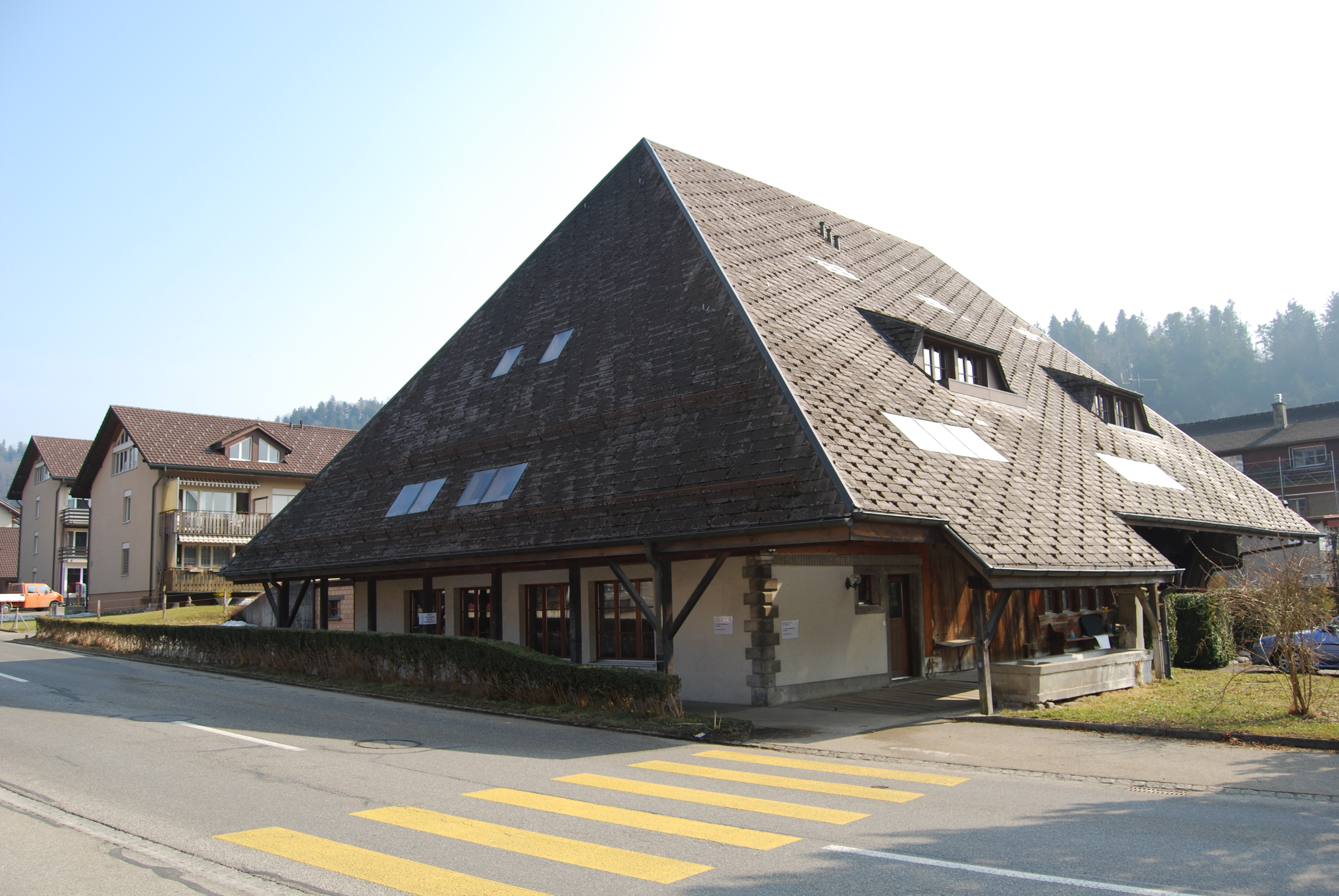
Grünen village, municipality of Sumiswald

Sumiswald has a population (as of December 2020) of 5,044. As of 2012, 5.5% of the population are resident foreign nationals. Between the 2010 and 2012, the population changed at a rate of 0.0%. Migration accounted for -0.1%, while births and deaths accounted for -0.4%.

As of 2000, most of the population (4,991 or 94.0%) spoke German as their first language, while Albanian and Serbo-Croatian were the second (74 or 1.4%) and third (48 or 0.9%) most common first languages, respectively. There were 17 people who spoke French, 17 people who spoke Italian and 2 people who spoke Romansh.

As of 2013, the population was 49.5% male and 50.5% female. The population was made up of 2,349 Swiss men (46.7% of the population) and 140 (2.8%) non-Swiss men. There were 2,404 Swiss women (47.8%) and 137 (2.7%) non-Swiss women. Of the population in the municipality, 2,532 (47.7%) were born in Sumiswald and lived there in 2000. There were 1,745 (32.9%) who were born in the same canton, while 410 (7.7%) were born somewhere else in Switzerland, and 396 (7.5%) were born outside of Switzerland.

As of 2012, children and teenagers (0–19 years old) make up 21.6% of the population, while adults (20–64 years old) make up 59.0% and seniors (over 64 years old) make up 19.4%.

As of 2000, there were 2,300 people who were single and never married in the municipality. There were 2,453 married individuals, 396 widows or widowers and 158 individuals who are divorced.

As of 2010, there were 679 households that consist of only one person and 200 households with five or more people. In 2000, a total of 1,983 apartments (87.5% of the total) were permanently occupied, while 166 apartments (7.3%) were seasonally occupied and 118 apartments (5.2%) were empty. As of 2012, the construction rate of new housing units was 3.2 new units per 1000 residents. The vacancy rate for the municipality, in 2013, was 0.7%. In 2012, single family homes made up 34.9% of the total housing in the municipality.

The historical population is given in the following chart:

== Economy ==
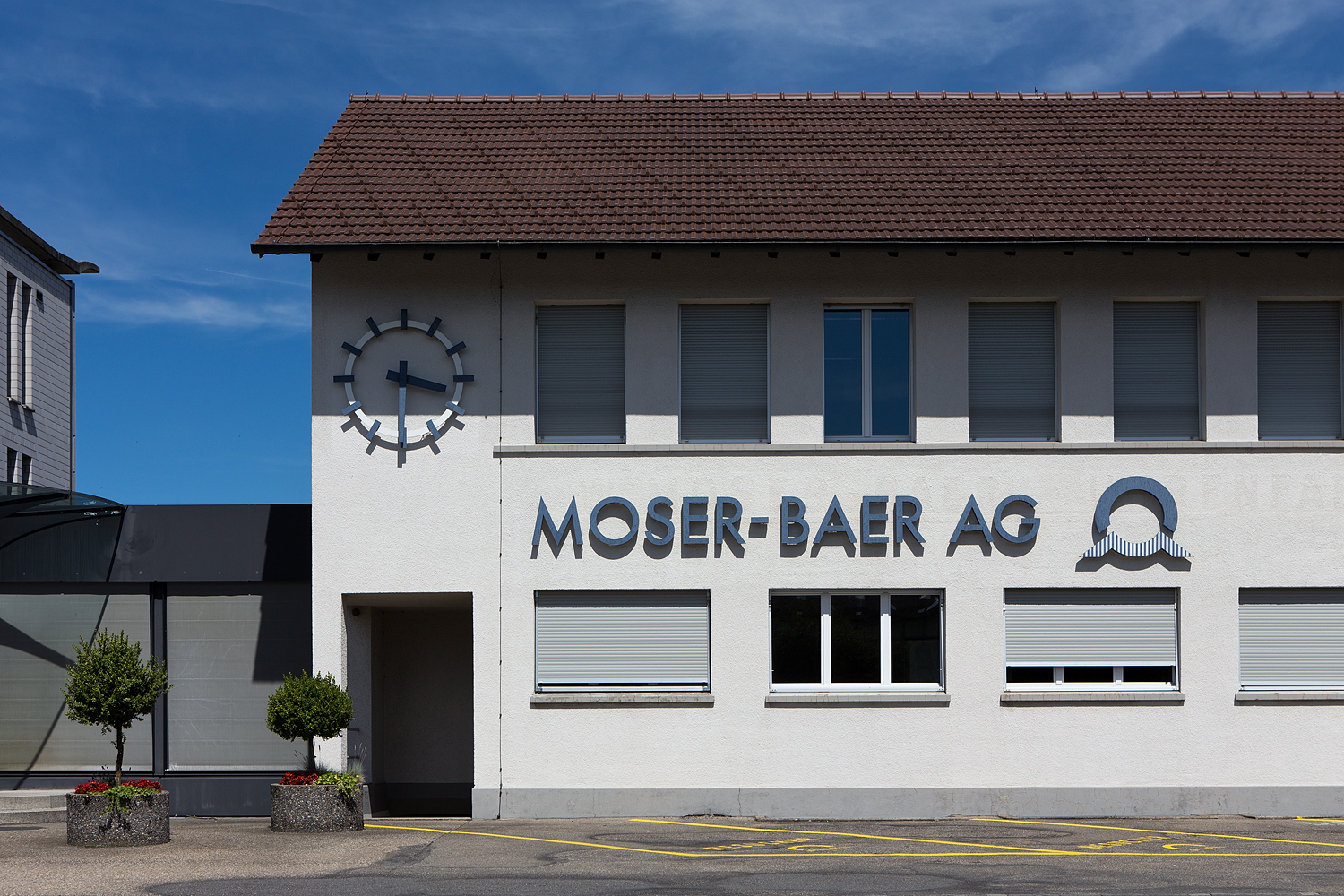
Moser-Baer clock factory

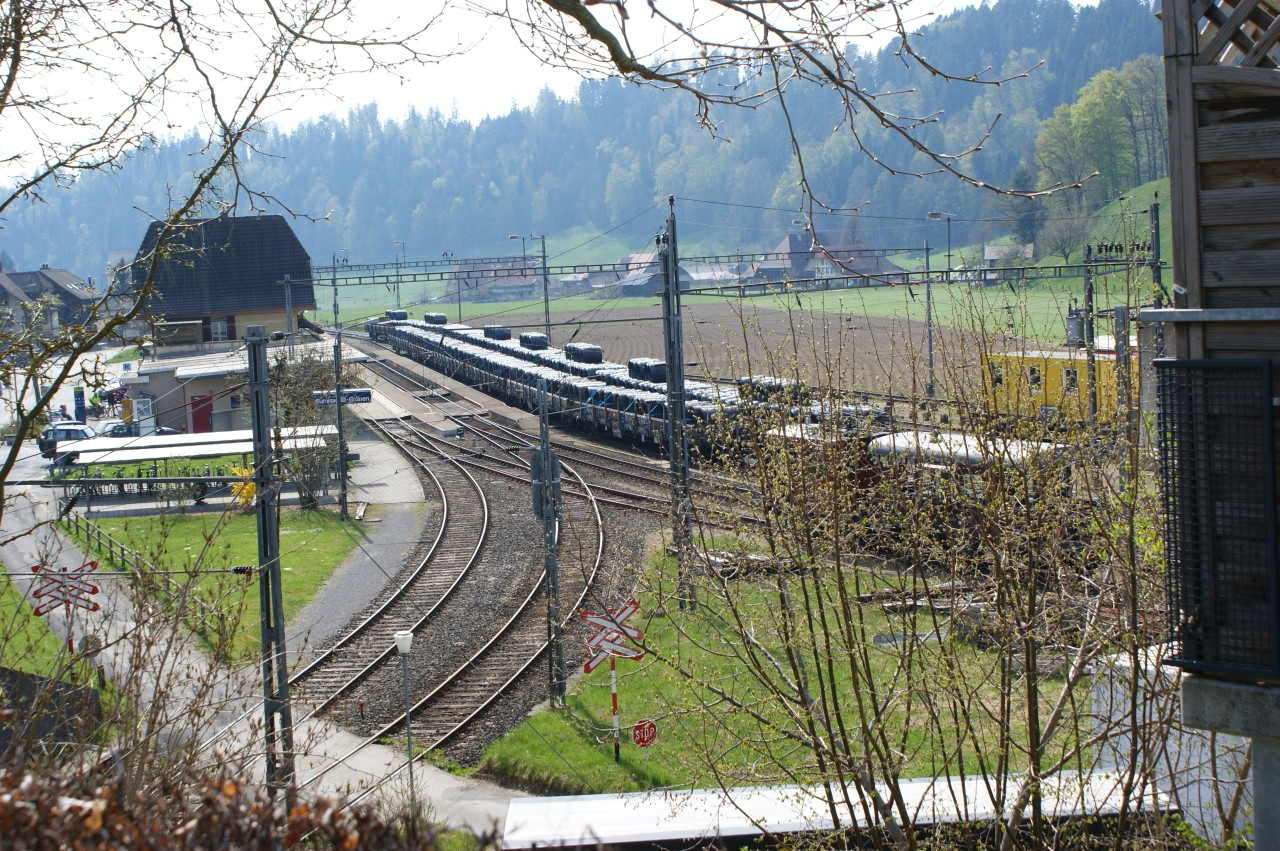
Sumiswald-Grünen rail station. Sumiswald is a net importer of workers.

The clock manufacturer Moser-Baer, manufacturer of the Swiss railway clocks, can be found in Sumiswald.

As of 2011, Sumiswald had an unemployment rate of 1.94%. As of 2011, there were a total of 2,973 people employed in the municipality. Of these, there were 510 people employed in the primary economic sector and about 185 businesses involved in this sector. The secondary sector employs 1,228 people and there were 93 businesses in this sector. The tertiary sector employs 1,235 people, with 208 businesses in this sector. There were 2,716 residents of the municipality who were employed in some capacity, of which females made up 41.6% of the workforce.

In 2008 there were a total of 2,354 full-time equivalent jobs. The number of jobs in the primary sector was 319, of which 316 were in agriculture and 2 were in forestry or lumber production. The number of jobs in the secondary sector was 1,262 of which 1,122 or (88.9%) were in manufacturing and 136 (10.8%) were in construction. The number of jobs in the tertiary sector was 773. In the tertiary sector, 185 or 23.9% were in wholesale or retail sales or the repair of motor vehicles, 53 or 6.9% were in the movement and storage of goods, 106 or 13.7% were in a hotel or restaurant, 15 or 1.9% were in the information industry, 69 or 8.9% were the insurance or financial industry, 30 or 3.9% were technical professionals or scientists, 64 or 8.3% were in education and 129 or 16.7% were in health care.

In 2000, there were 981 workers who commuted into the municipality and 884 workers who commuted away. The municipality is a net importer of workers, with about 1.1 workers entering the municipality for every one leaving. A total of 1,831 workers (65.1% of the 2,812 total workers in the municipality) both lived and worked in Sumiswald. Of the working population, 7.4% used public transportation to get to work, and 51.3% used a private car.

In 2013 the average church, local and cantonal tax rate on a married resident, with two children, of Sumiswald making 150,000 CHF was 12.0%, while an unmarried resident's rate was 18.5%. For comparison, the median rate for all municipalities in the entire canton was 11.7% and 18.1%, while the nationwide median was 10.6% and 17.4% respectively.

In 2011 there were 1,817 taxpayers in the municipality. Most workers (448) made between 50,000 and 75,000 CHF per year, while 8 workers made between 15,000 and 20,000 per year and 374 made over 75,000 CHF per year. The average income of the over 75,000 CHF group in Sumiswald was 113,051 CHF, while the average across all of Switzerland was 136,785 CHF.

In 2011 a total of 2.2% of the population received direct financial assistance from the government.

== Heritage sites of national significance ==
The Gasthof Bären (Bären Inn), the village rectory and the Swiss Reformed church are listed as Swiss heritage site of national significance. The entire village of Sumiswald is part of the Inventory of Swiss Heritage Sites.

=== Attractions ===
The glass windows of the church Mariekirche depict benefactors with their patron saints.

The old Teutonic Knight castle is somewhat outside of Sumiswald. It was endowed in 1225 with the condition that a hospital be housed in it, therefore the castle's name is Spittel.

It is said that all the men in Sumiswald could have taken a seat at the large table in the inn "Bären" after the plague in 1434.

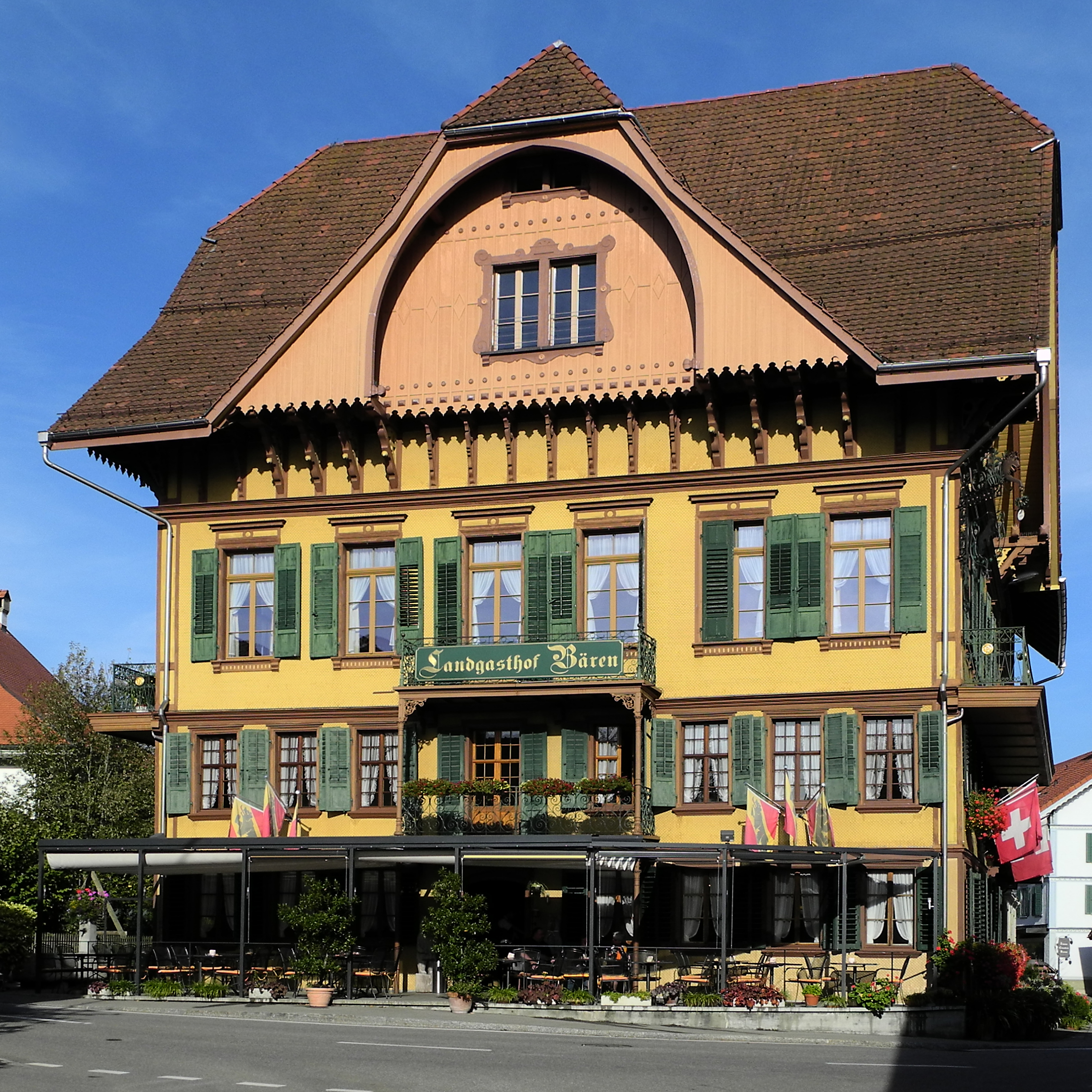
The Gasthof Bären

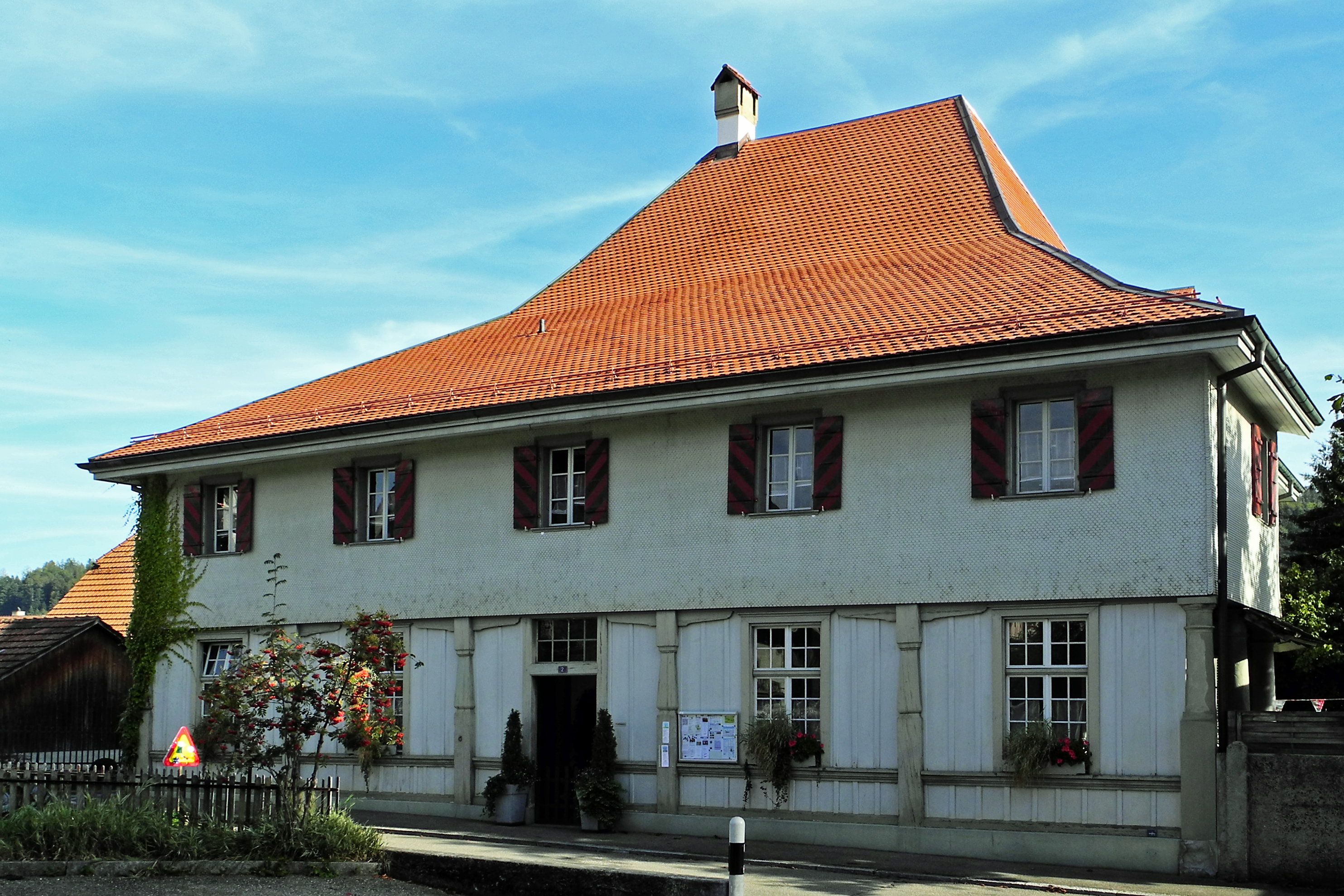
Village rectory

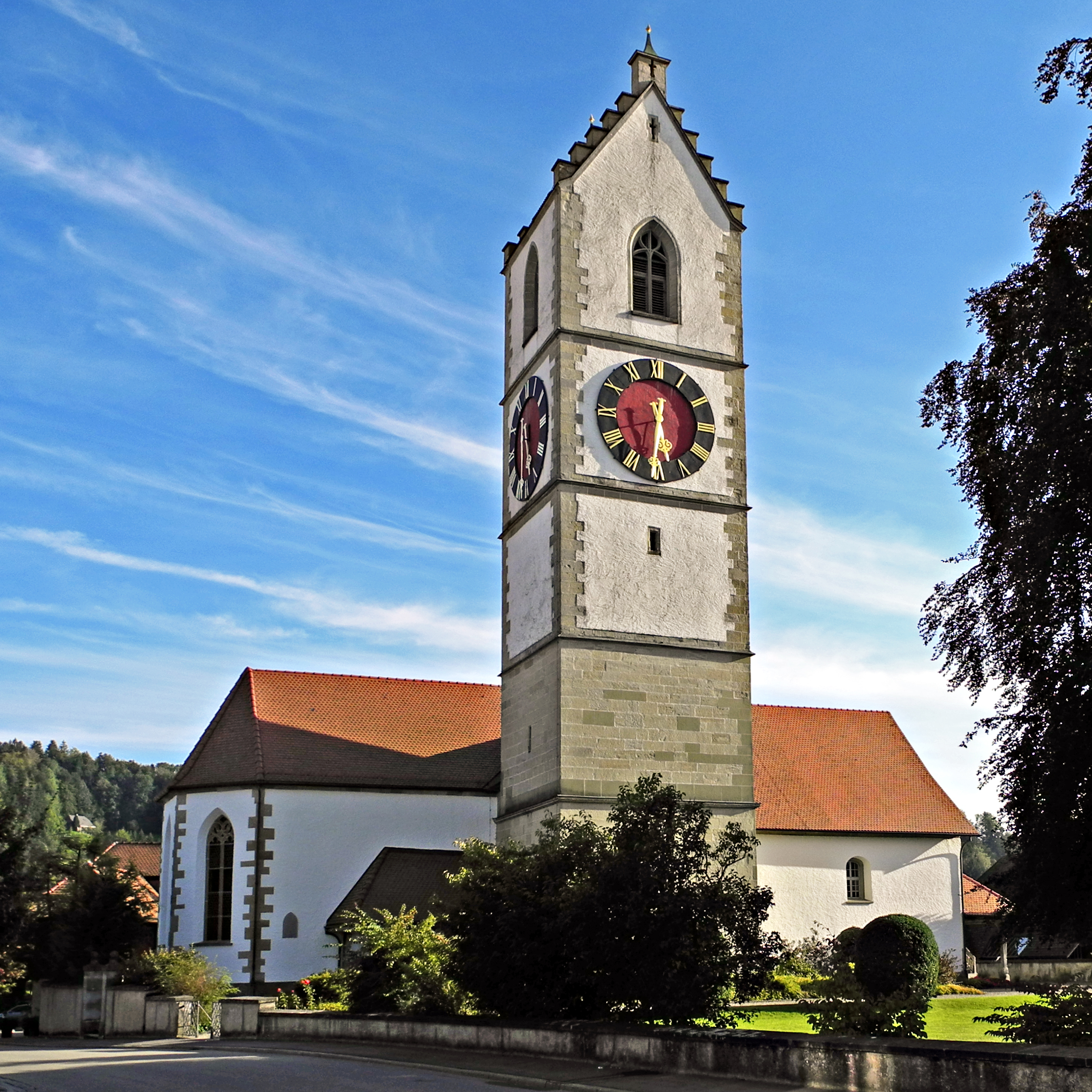
Village church

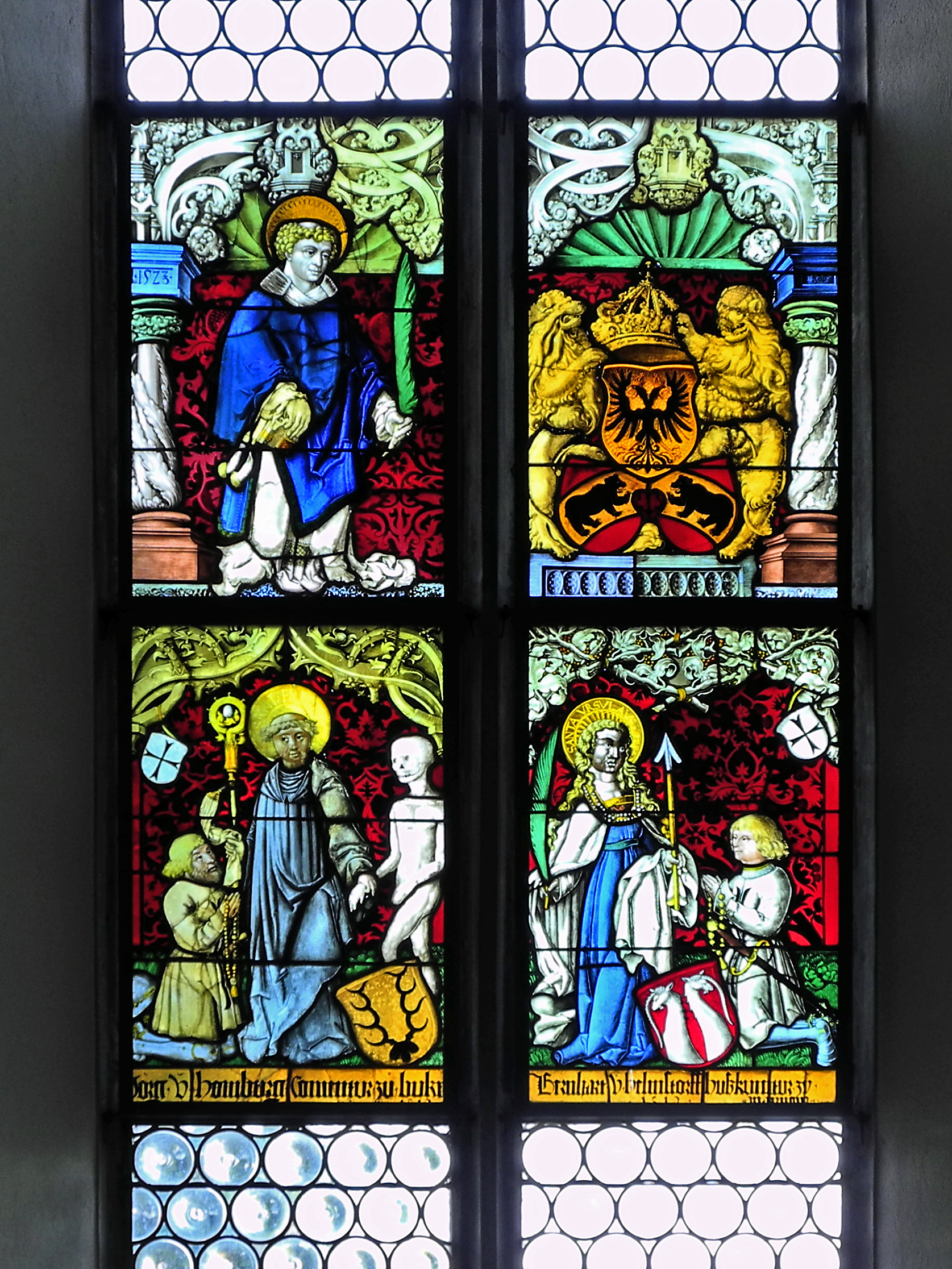
Stained glass window in the church depicting benefactors

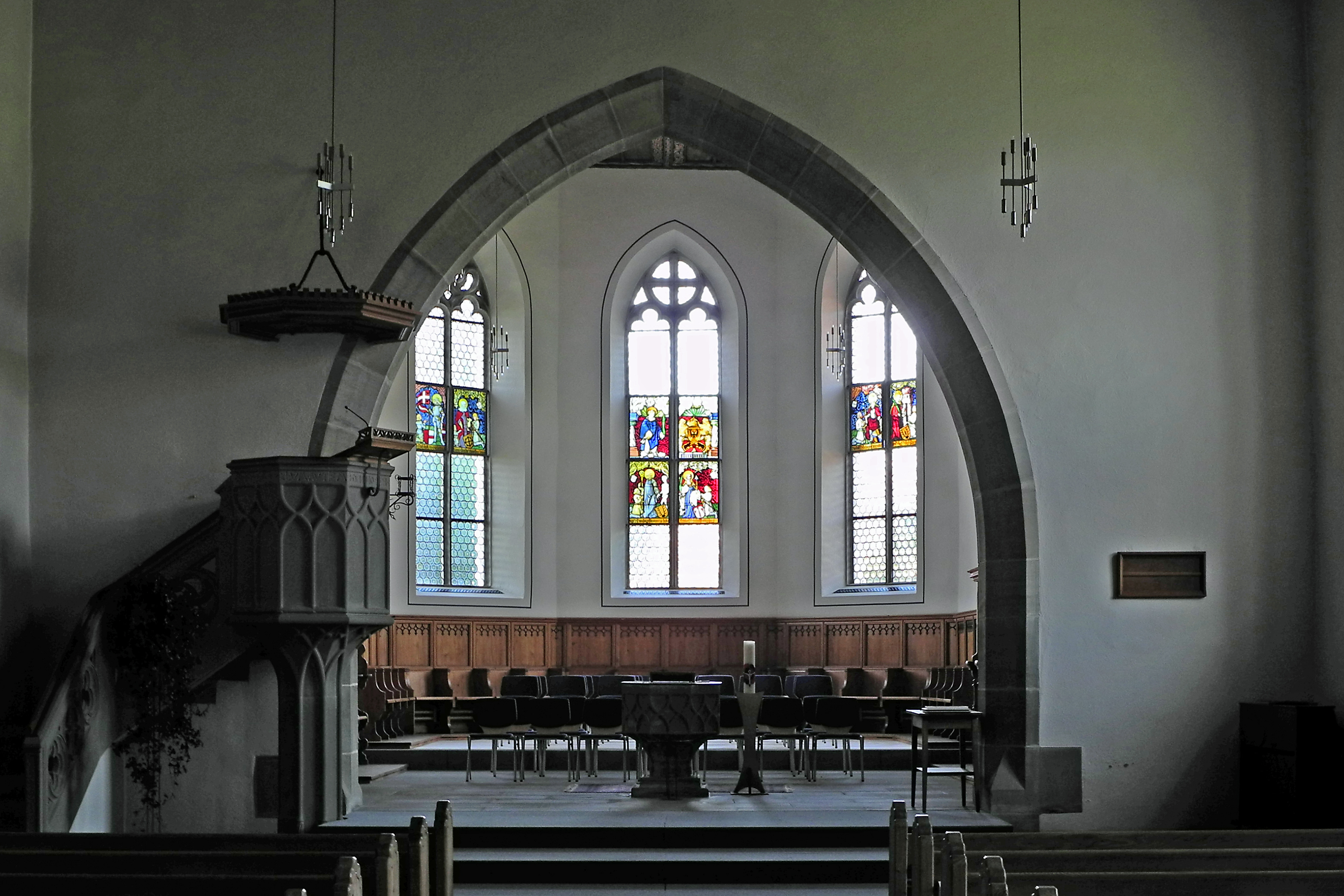
Choir of the Swiss Reformed church

== Politics ==
In the 2011 federal election the most popular party was the Swiss People's Party (SVP) which received 36.8% of the vote. The next three most popular parties were the Conservative Democratic Party (BDP) (19.6%), the Social Democratic Party (SP) (11.8%) and the Federal Democratic Union of Switzerland (EDU) (7.2%). In the federal election, a total of 1,795 votes were cast, and the voter turnout was 44.7%.

== Religion ==
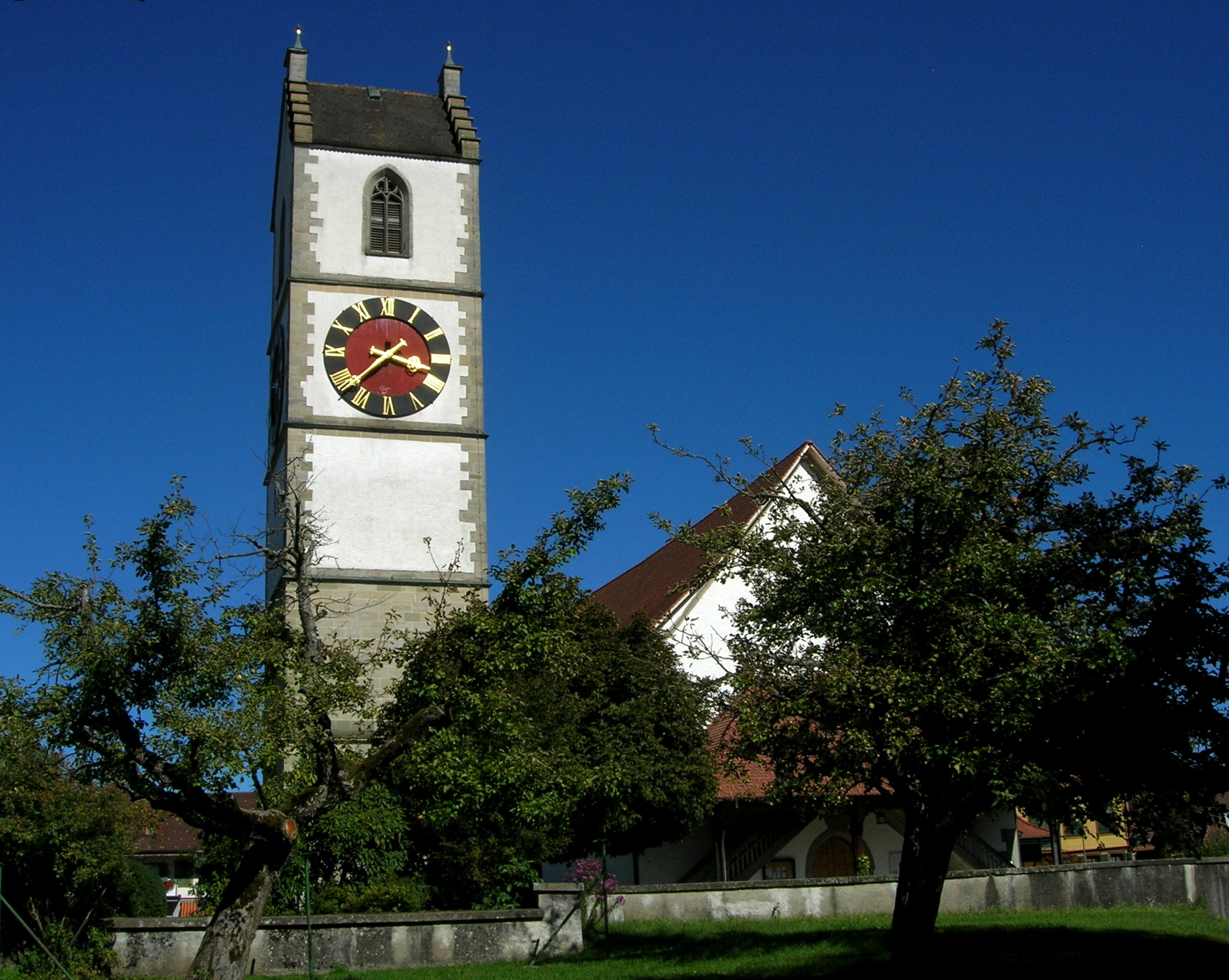
Sumiswald village church

From the 2000 census, 4,258 or 80.2% belonged to the Swiss Reformed Church, while 227 or 4.3% were Roman Catholic. Of the rest of the population, there were 35 members of an Orthodox church (or about 0.66% of the population), there were 2 individuals (or about 0.04% of the population) who belonged to the Christian Catholic Church, and there were 154 individuals (or about 2.90% of the population) who belonged to another Christian church. There were 142 (or about 2.68% of the population) who were Muslim. There were 2 individuals who were Buddhist, 121 individuals who were Hindu and 3 individuals who belonged to another church. 159 (or about 3.00% of the population) belonged to no church, are agnostic or atheist, and 204 individuals (or about 3.84% of the population) did not answer the question.

== Education ==
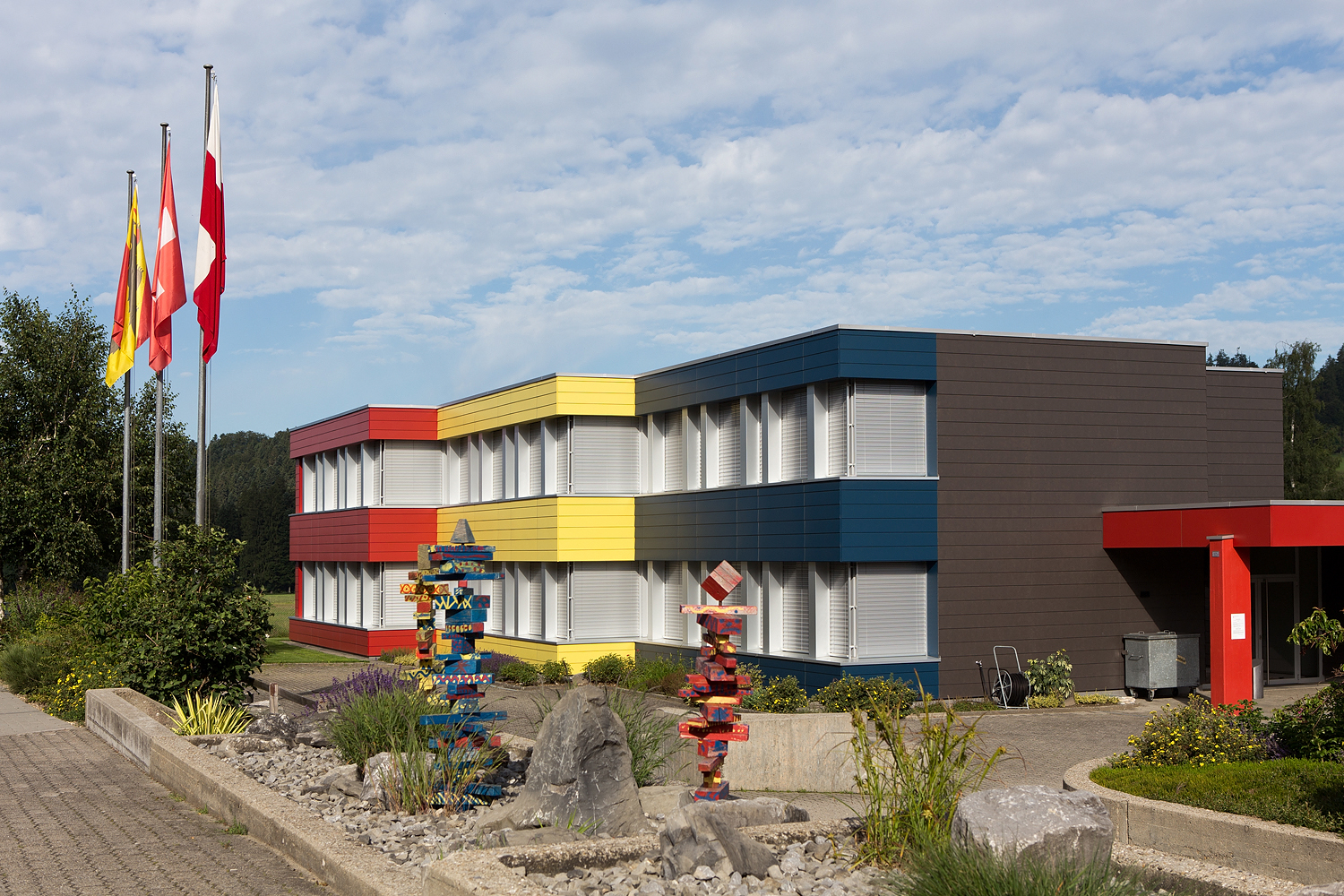
A primary school in Sumiswald

In Sumiswald about 54.6% of the population have completed non-mandatory upper secondary education, and 13.8% have completed additional higher education (either university or a Fachhochschule). Of the 447 who had completed some form of tertiary schooling listed in the census, 73.8% were Swiss men, 22.6% were Swiss women, 2.5% were non-Swiss men and 1.1% were non-Swiss women.

The Canton of Bern school system provides one year of non-obligatory kindergarten, followed by six years of primary school. This is followed by three years of obligatory lower secondary school where the students are separated according to ability and aptitude. Following the lower secondary, students may choose to attend additional schooling or enter an apprenticeship.

During the 2012–13 school year, there were a total of 588 students attending classes in Sumiswald. There were a total of 103 students in the German language kindergarten classes in the municipality. Of the kindergarten students, 13.6% were permanent or temporary residents of Switzerland (not citizens) and 18.4% have a different mother language than the classroom language. The municipality's primary school had 294 students in German language classes. Of the primary students, 4.8% were permanent or temporary residents of Switzerland (not citizens) and 12.9% have a different mother language than the classroom language. During the same year, the lower secondary school had a total of 191 students. There were 3.7% who were permanent or temporary residents of Switzerland (not citizens) and 11.0% have a different mother language than the classroom language.

As of 2000, there were a total of 888 students attending any school in the municipality. Of those, 699 both lived and attended school in the municipality, while 189 students came from another municipality. During the same year, 118 residents attended schools outside the municipality.

Sumiswald is home to the Schul- und Gemeindebibliothek Sumiswald (municipal library of Sumiswald). The library has (as of 2008) 9,171 books or other media, and loaned out 28,437 items in the same year. It was open a total of 166 days with average of 8.5 hours per week during that year.
