= Oeschenbach =

- Municipality
- Flag Coat of arms
- Location of Oeschenbach
- Location within Switzerland Location within Canton of Bern
- Coordinates: 47°6′N 7°45′E
- Country: Switzerland
- Canton: Bern
- District: Oberaargau

Area
  - Total: 3.9 km^{2} (1.5 sq mi)
- Elevation: 650 m (2,130 ft)

Population (December 2020)
  - Total: 220
  - Density: 56/km^{2} (150/sq mi)
- Time zone: UTC+01:00 (CET)
  - Summer (DST): UTC+02:00 (CEST)
- Postal code: 4943
- SFOS number: 335
- ISO 3166 code: CH-BE
- Surrounded by: Ochlenberg, Ursenbach, Walterswil, Wynigen
- Website: http://www.oeschenbach.ch SFSO statistics

Oeschenbach is a municipality in the Oberaargau administrative district in the canton of Bern in Switzerland.

== History ==
Oeschenbach is first mentioned between 841 and 72 as Eschibach in a donation document to the Abbey of St. Gall. In 1287, St. Urban's Abbey was listed as the major property holder in the village. In 1408, Bern acquired the Kyburg lands which included Oeschenbach. What would become the municipality of Oeschenbach was divided. Some time before 1431, the farms of Oeschenbach, Böschenhubel, Kleinhaus, Bruch, Oeschenberg, Rebelberg and Sage were assigned to the Court of Affoltern in the Amt of Trachselwald, while Oeschenbach village and 16 other farms or farm house groups went to the Court of Ursenbach in the Amt of Wangen. The settlements remained separated until 1803, though when they reunited as a community in a political municipality. Finally in 1885, the community separated from the municipality of Rohrbach to become an independent municipality.

The local economy has always been dominated by agriculture. Beginning in the 19th century many farms shifted from raising hay and crops to cattle and dairy farming. Several cheese factories opened in the municipality in 1850, 1883 and 1889. The population has slowly decreased since 1850 as residents migrate away. Starting in the 1960s an increasing number of residents have started commuting to jobs outside the municipality. In 2005, almost two-thirds of the remaining jobs in Oeschenbach were in agriculture.

== Geography ==
Oeschenbach has an area of 3.92 km^{2} (1.51 sq mi). Of this area, 2.51 km^{2} (0.97 mi^{2}) or 64.4% is used for agricultural purposes, while 1.17 km^{2} (0.45 mi^{2}) or 30.0% is forested. Of the rest of the land, 0.2 km^{2} (0.077 mi^{2}) or 5.1% is settled (buildings or roads), 0.02 km^{2} (4.9 acres) or 0.5% is either rivers or lakes.

Of the built up area, housing and buildings made up 3.1% and transportation infrastructure made up 1.8%. Out of the forested land, all of the forested land area is covered with heavy forests. Of the agricultural land, 18.5% is used for growing crops and 44.1% is pastures, while 1.8% is used for orchards or vine crops. All the water in the municipality is flowing water.

The municipality is located in a side valley of the Langeten valley. It consists of the village of Oeschenbach and the hamlets of Bleuen and Zulligen as well as scattered farm houses.

On 31 December 2009 Amtsbezirk Aarwangen, the municipality's former district, was dissolved. On the following day, 1 January 2010, it joined the newly created Verwaltungskreis Oberaargau.

== Coat of arms ==
The blazon of the municipal coat of arms is Gules a Barrulet wavy Argent overall an Ash Tree eradicated of the same. Both the ash tree (German: Esche) and the wavy line representing a brook (German: Bach) make this an example of canting.

== Demographics ==
Oeschenbach has a population (as of December 2020) of 220. As of 2010, 1.7% of the population are resident foreign nationals. Over the last 10 years (2000-2010) the population has changed at a rate of -18.5%. Migration accounted for -12.1%, while births and deaths accounted for -0.7%.

Most of the population (as of 2000) speaks German (275 or 98.6%) as their first language, Albanian is the second most common (2 or 0.7%) and French is the third (1 or 0.4%). There is 1 person who speaks Italian.

As of 2008, the population was 50.2% male and 49.8% female. The population was made up of 119 Swiss men (49.4% of the population) and 2 (0.8%) non-Swiss men. There were 118 Swiss women (49.0%) and 2 (0.8%) non-Swiss women. Of the population in the municipality, 140 or about 50.2% were born in Oeschenbach and lived there in 2000. There were 100 or 35.8% who were born in the same canton, while 12 or 4.3% were born somewhere else in Switzerland, and 13 or 4.7% were born outside of Switzerland.

As of 2010, children and teenagers (0–19 years old) make up 17.8% of the population, while adults (20–64 years old) make up 63.5% and seniors (over 64 years old) make up 18.7%.

As of 2000, there were 121 people who were single and never married in the municipality. There were 129 married individuals, 27 widows or widowers and 2 individuals who are divorced.

As of 2000, there were 20 households that consist of only one person and 19 households with five or more people. In 2000, a total of 93 apartments (83.8% of the total) were permanently occupied, while 9 apartments (8.1%) were seasonally occupied and 9 apartments (8.1%) were empty. The vacancy rate for the municipality, in 2011, was 3.39%.

The historical population is given in the following chart:

== Politics ==
In the 2011 federal election the most popular party was the SVP which received 45.1% of the vote. The next three most popular parties were the BDP Party (18.1%), the EVP Party (17.9%) and the EVP Party (17.9%). In the federal election, a total of 83 votes were cast, and the voter turnout was 40.9%.

== Economy ==
As of 2011, Oeschenbach had an unemployment rate of 1.91%. As of 2008, there were a total of 132 people employed in the municipality. Of these, there were 76 people employed in the primary economic sector and about 20 businesses involved in this sector. 18 people were employed in the secondary sector and there were 5 businesses in this sector. 38 people were employed in the tertiary sector, with 8 businesses in this sector.

In 2008 there were a total of 86 full-time equivalent jobs. The number of jobs in the primary sector was 45, all of which were in agriculture. The number of jobs in the secondary sector was 16 of which 9 or (56.3%) were in manufacturing and 7 (43.8%) were in construction. The number of jobs in the tertiary sector was 25. In the tertiary sector; 16 or 64.0% were in wholesale or retail sales or the repair of motor vehicles, 2 or 8.0% were in a hotel or restaurant, 4 or 16.0% were in education.

In 2000, there were 18 workers who commuted into the municipality and 83 workers who commuted away. The municipality is a net exporter of workers, with about 4.6 workers leaving the municipality for every one entering. Of the working population, 5.4% used public transportation to get to work, and 52.4% used a private car.

== Religion ==
From the 2000 census, 12 or 4.3% were Roman Catholic, while 258 or 92.5% belonged to the Swiss Reformed Church. Of the rest of the population, there was 1 individual who belongs to another Christian church. 4 (or about 1.43% of the population) belonged to no church, are agnostic or atheist, and 4 individuals (or about 1.43% of the population) did not answer the question.

== Education ==
In Oeschenbach about 97 or (34.8%) of the population have completed non-mandatory upper secondary education, and 14 or (5.0%) have completed additional higher education (either university or a Fachhochschule). Of the 14 who completed tertiary schooling, 85.7% were Swiss men, 14.3% were Swiss women.

The Canton of Bern school system provides one year of non-obligatory Kindergarten, followed by six years of Primary school. This is followed by three years of obligatory lower Secondary school where the students are separated according to ability and aptitude. Following the lower Secondary students may attend additional schooling or they may enter an apprenticeship.

During the 2010–11 school year, there were no students attending school in Oeschenbach.

As of 2000, there were 3 students in Oeschenbach who came from another municipality, while 14 residents attended schools outside the municipality.
