= Ursenbach (disambiguation) =

Ursenbach may also refer to:

- Ursenbach is a municipality in Switzerland in the Oberaargau administrative district.
- Maureen Ursenbach Beecher (born 1935), English professor
