= Trachselwald District =

Coordinates: 47.0167°N 7.71667°E

Trachselwald District Amtsbezirk Trachselwald
- District
- Flag Coat of arms

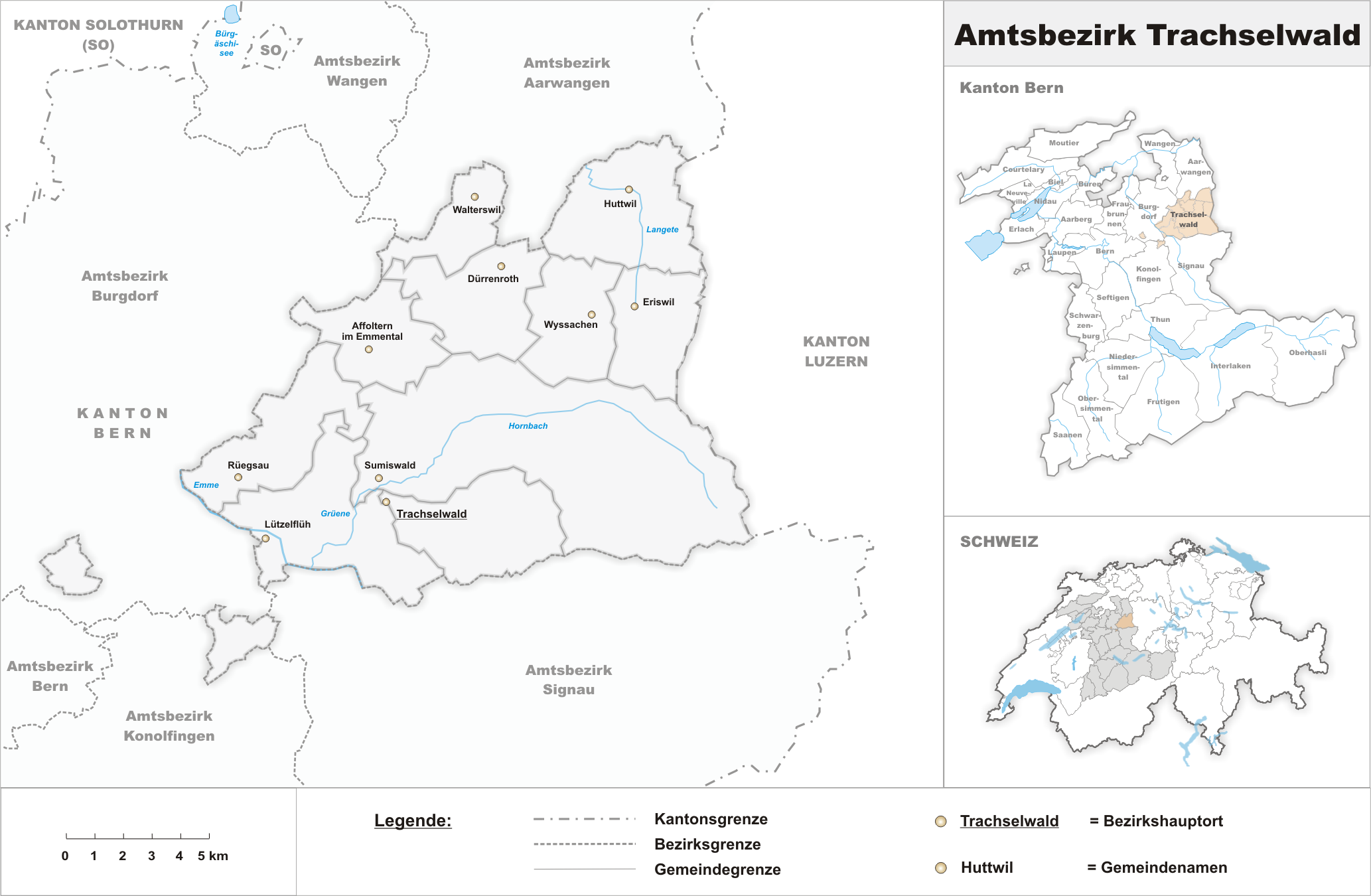
- Country: Switzerland
- Canton: Bern
- Capital: Trachselwald

Area
  - Total: 191 km^{2} (74 sq mi)

Population (2007)
  - Total: 23,327
  - Density: 122/km^{2} (316/sq mi)
- Time zone: UTC+1 (CET)
  - Summer (DST): UTC+2 (CEST)
- Municipalities: 10

Trachselwald District is a district in the canton of Bern, Switzerland. From 1 January 2010, the district lost its administrative power while being replaced by the Emmental (administrative district), whose administrative centre is Langnau im Emmental. Since 2010, it remains therefore a fully recognised district under the law and the Constitution (Art.3 al.2) of the Canton of Berne. Its governor's seat was in Trachselwald Castle in Trachselwald. It consistes of 10 municipalities within an area of 191 km².

Municipality	Population (Dec 2007)	Area (km²)
Affoltern im Emmental	1151	11.5
Dürrenroth	1031	14.1
Eriswil	1431	11.3
Huttwil	4708	17.3
Lützelflüh	4077	26.9
Rüegsau	3051	15.1
Sumiswald	5176	59.4
Trachselwald	1049	16.0
Walterswil	560	7.9
Wyssachen	1193	11.8
