= Walterswil, Bern =

Walterswil
- Municipality
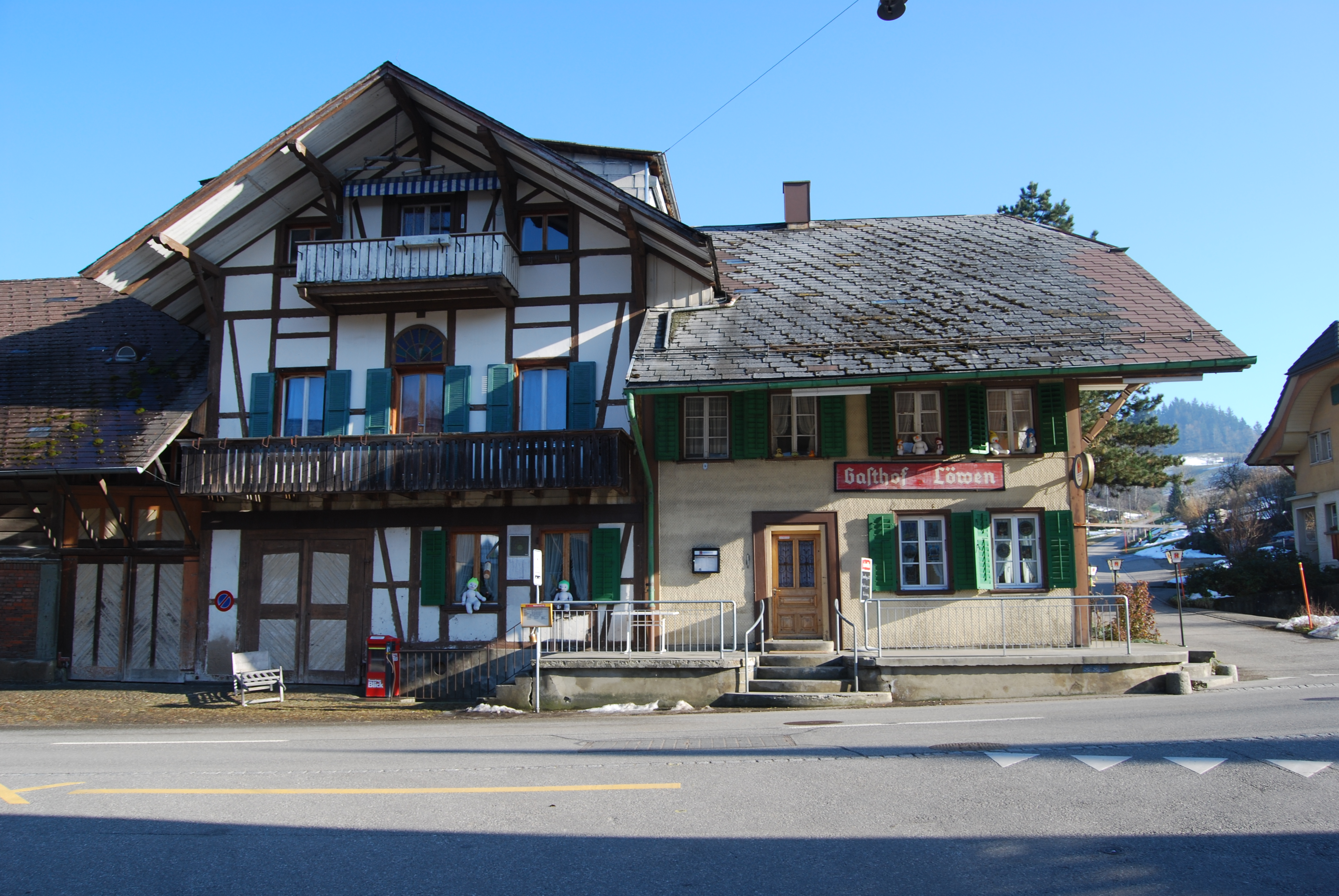

- Flag Coat of arms
- Location of Walterswil
- Location within Switzerland Location within Canton of Bern
- Coordinates: 47°7′N 7°47′E
- Country: Switzerland
- Canton: Bern
- District: Oberaargau

Government
  - Mayor: Ernst Lanz

Area
  - Total: 7.9 km^{2} (3.1 sq mi)
- Elevation: 658 m (2,159 ft)

Population (Dec 2012)
  - Total: 541
  - Density: 68/km^{2} (180/sq mi)
- Time zone: UTC+01:00 (CET)
  - Summer (DST): UTC+02:00 (CEST)
- Postal code: 4942
- SFOS number: 959
- ISO 3166 code: CH-BE
- Surrounded by: Affoltern im Emmental, Dürrenroth, Oeschenbach, Rohrbachgraben, Ursenbach, Wynigen
- Website: www.walterswil-be.ch

Walterswil is a municipality in the Oberaargau administrative district in the Swiss canton of Bern.

== History ==
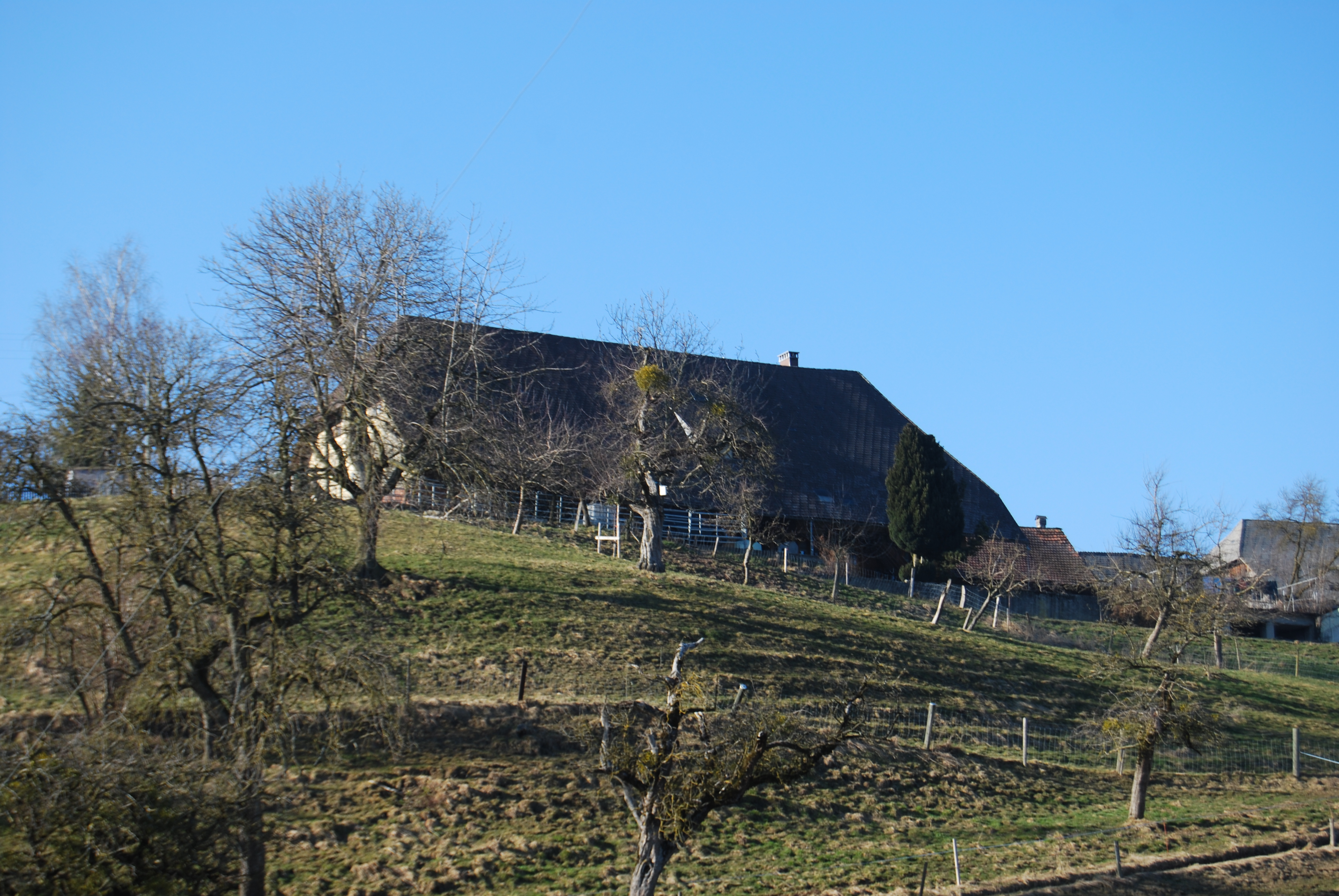
A barn and small fields in Walterswil. Today over two-thirds of jobs in the municipality are in agriculture.

Walterswil is first mentioned in 1139 as Walterswile.

The local Freiherr von Walterswil appear in historic records until the early 14th century. After their extinction, portions of the modern municipality were owned by other local nobles. The village church of Saint Cecilia was first mentioned in 1275. In 1438 Henman von Spiegelberg gave the village, the court and the patronage rights over the village church of Walterswil to the city of Bern in exchange for another property. In the following year, Bern divided Walterswil between several nearby courts. Following the 1798 French invasion, the smaller Walterswil parish became part of the Helvetic Republic district of Unteremmental. After the collapse of the Republic and 1803 Act of Mediation it joined the newly created Trachselwald District. Finally, in 1888-89 it received part of the Hubberg Quarter (Hubbergviertel) from Ursenbach, which expanded the municipality to its modern borders.

Historically the local economy was based on farming with some cottage industry canvas weaving in the 18th and 19th centuries. Today many residents commute to jobs in nearby cities and towns and about 71% of the jobs in the municipality are in agriculture.

== Geography ==
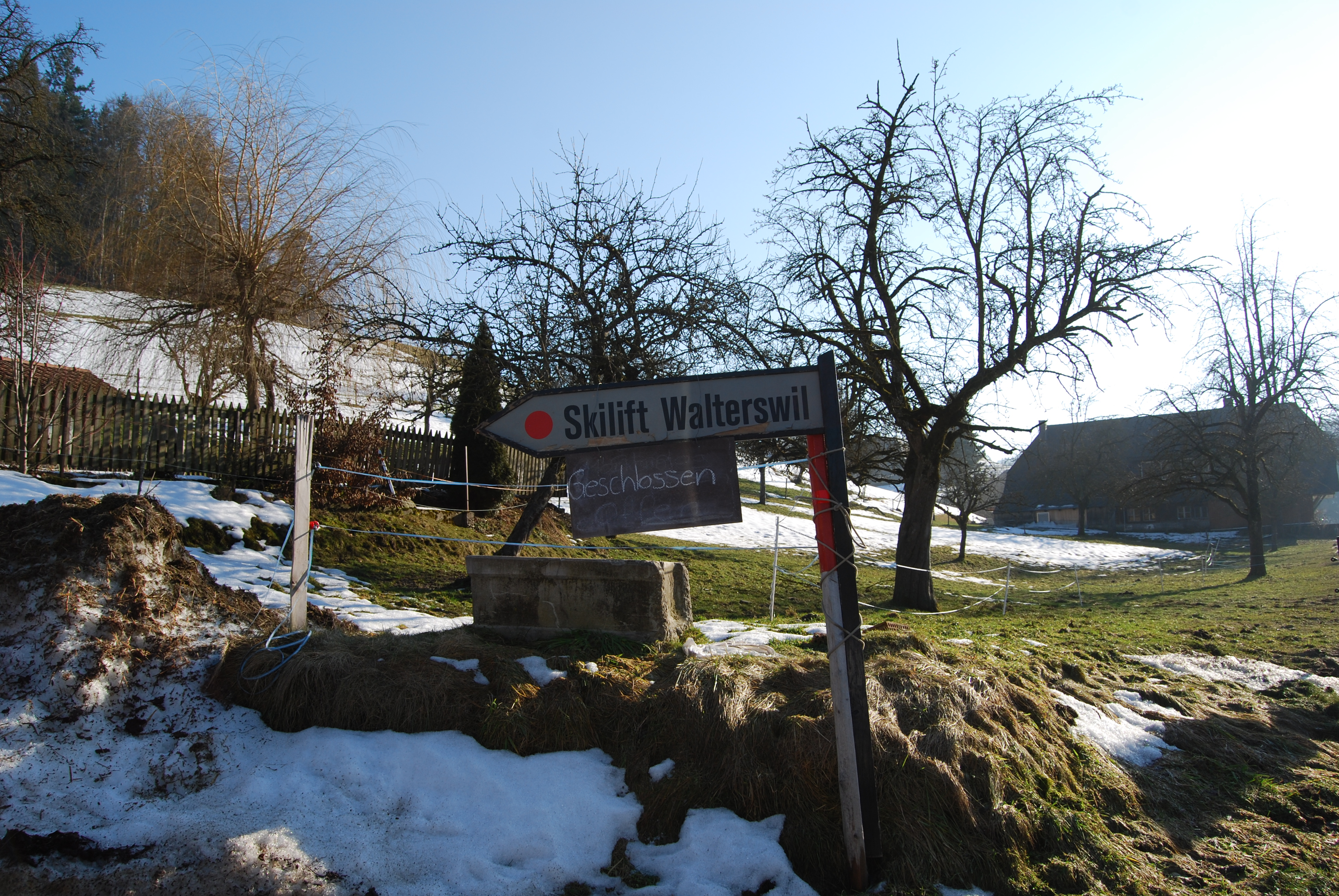
Hillsides and a sign pointing to Walterswil ski lift in the municipality

Walterswil has an area of 7.87 km^{2} (3.04 sq mi). As of the 2006 survey, a total of 5.86 km^{2} (2.26 mi^{2}) or 74.1% is used for agricultural purposes, while 1.68 km^{2} (0.65 mi^{2}) or 21.2% is forested. Of rest of the municipality 0.4 km^{2} (0.15 mi^{2}) or 5.1% is settled (buildings or roads).

From the same survey, housing and buildings made up 2.7% and transportation infrastructure made up 2.4%. All of the forested land area is covered with heavy forests. Of the agricultural land, 36.8% is used for growing crops and 35.5% is pasturage, while 1.8% is used for orchards or vine crops.

The municipality consists of the village of Walterswil, the hamlets of Schmidigen and Mühleweg, a cluster of farm houses at Wiggisberg and other individual farm houses.

On 31 December 2009 Amtsbezirk Trachselwald, the municipality's former district, was dissolved. On the following day, 1 January 2010, it joined the newly created Verwaltungskreis Oberaargau.

== Coat of arms ==
The blazon of the municipal coat of arms is Argent three branches palewise in fess raguly inflamed Gules.

== Demographics ==
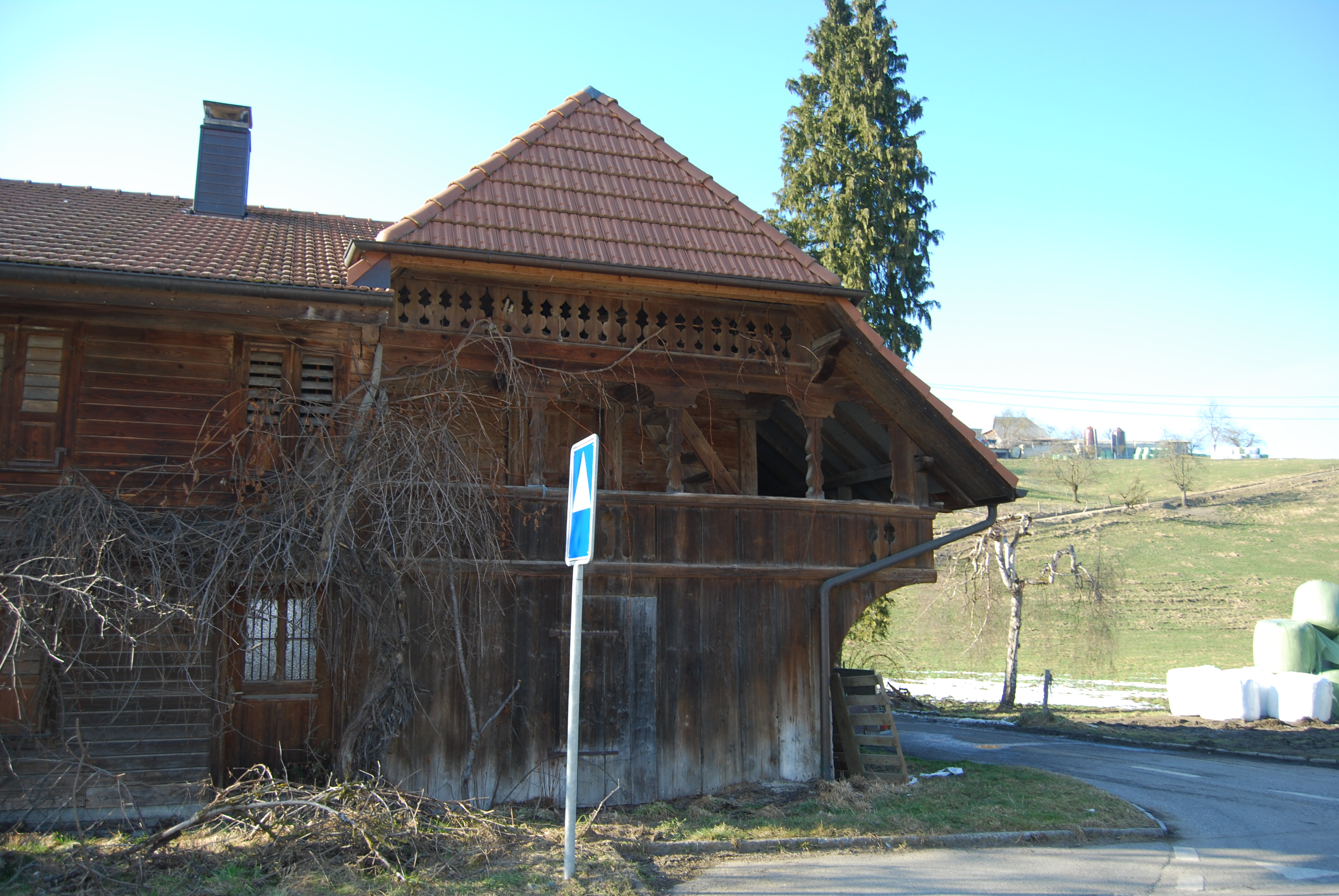
Traditional house and plastic wrapped hay bales in Walterswil.

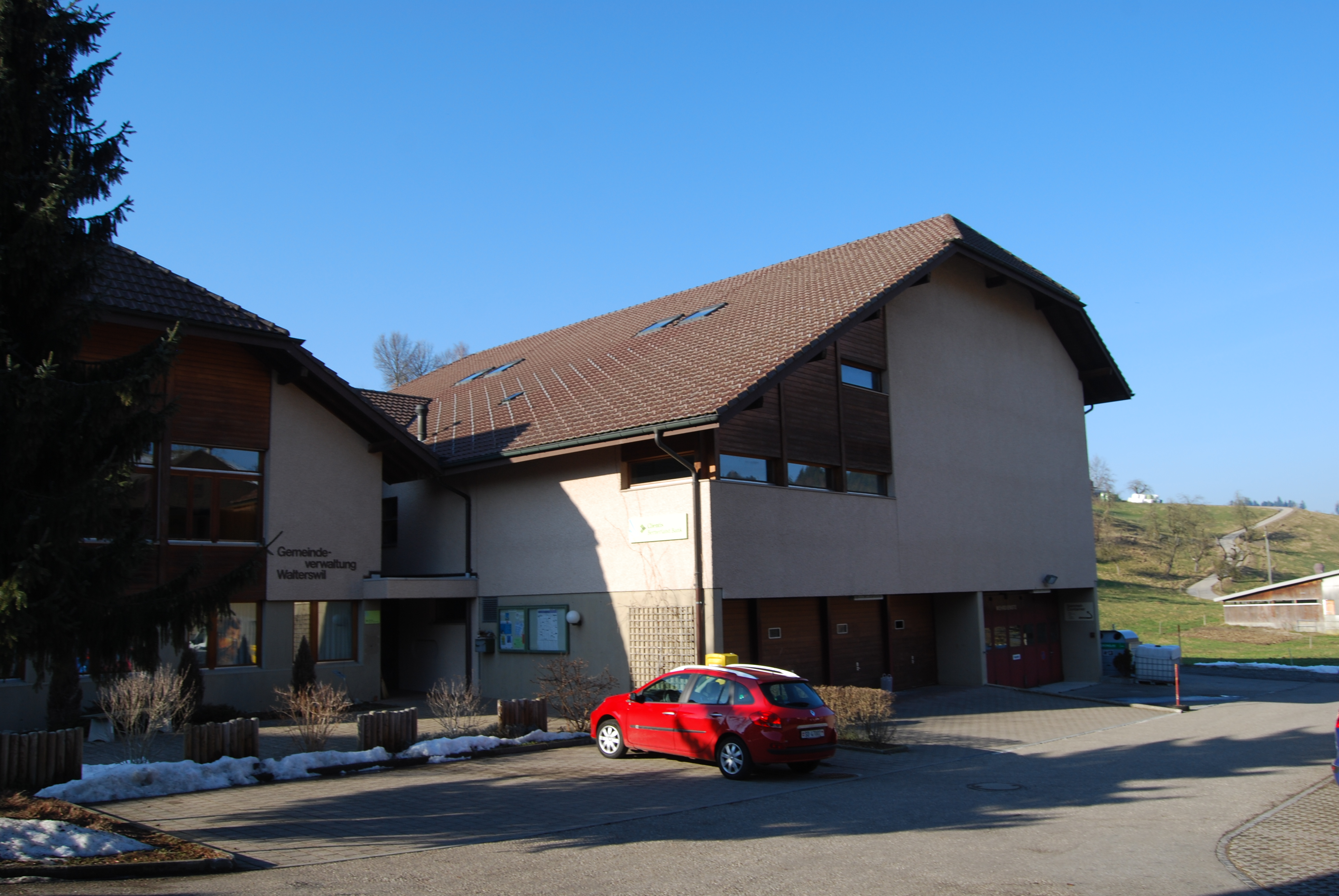
Modern municipal administration building

Walterswil has a population (as of December 2020) of 540. As of 2012, 1.7% of the population are resident foreign nationals. Between the last 2 years (2010-2012) the population changed at a rate of 0.2%. Migration accounted for 1.9%, while births and deaths accounted for -0.7%.

Most of the population (as of 2000) speaks German (540 or 98.9%) as their first language, Albanian is the second most common (5 or 0.9%) and French is the third (1 or 0.2%).

As of 2013, the population was 50.8% male and 49.2% female. The population was made up of 272 Swiss men (50.1% of the population) and 4 (0.7%) non-Swiss men. There were 266 Swiss women (49.0%) and 1 (0.2%) non-Swiss women. Of the population in the municipality, 290 or about 53.1% were born in Walterswil and lived there in 2000. There were 192 or 35.2% who were born in the same canton, while 29 or 5.3% were born somewhere else in Switzerland, and 6 or 1.1% were born outside of Switzerland.

As of 2012, children and teenagers (0–19 years old) make up 24.0% of the population, while adults (20–64 years old) make up 56.6% and seniors (over 64 years old) make up 19.4%.

As of 2000, there were 237 people who were single and never married in the municipality. There were 277 married individuals, 22 widows or widowers and 10 individuals who are divorced.

As of 2010, there were 44 households that consist of only one person and 29 households with five or more people. In 2000, a total of 178 apartments (82.4% of the total) were permanently occupied, while 29 apartments (13.4%) were seasonally occupied and 9 apartments (4.2%) were empty. As of 2012, the construction rate of new housing units was 3.7 new units per 1000 residents. In 2012, single family homes made up 29.9% of the total housing in the municipality.

The historical population is given in the following chart:

== Economy ==
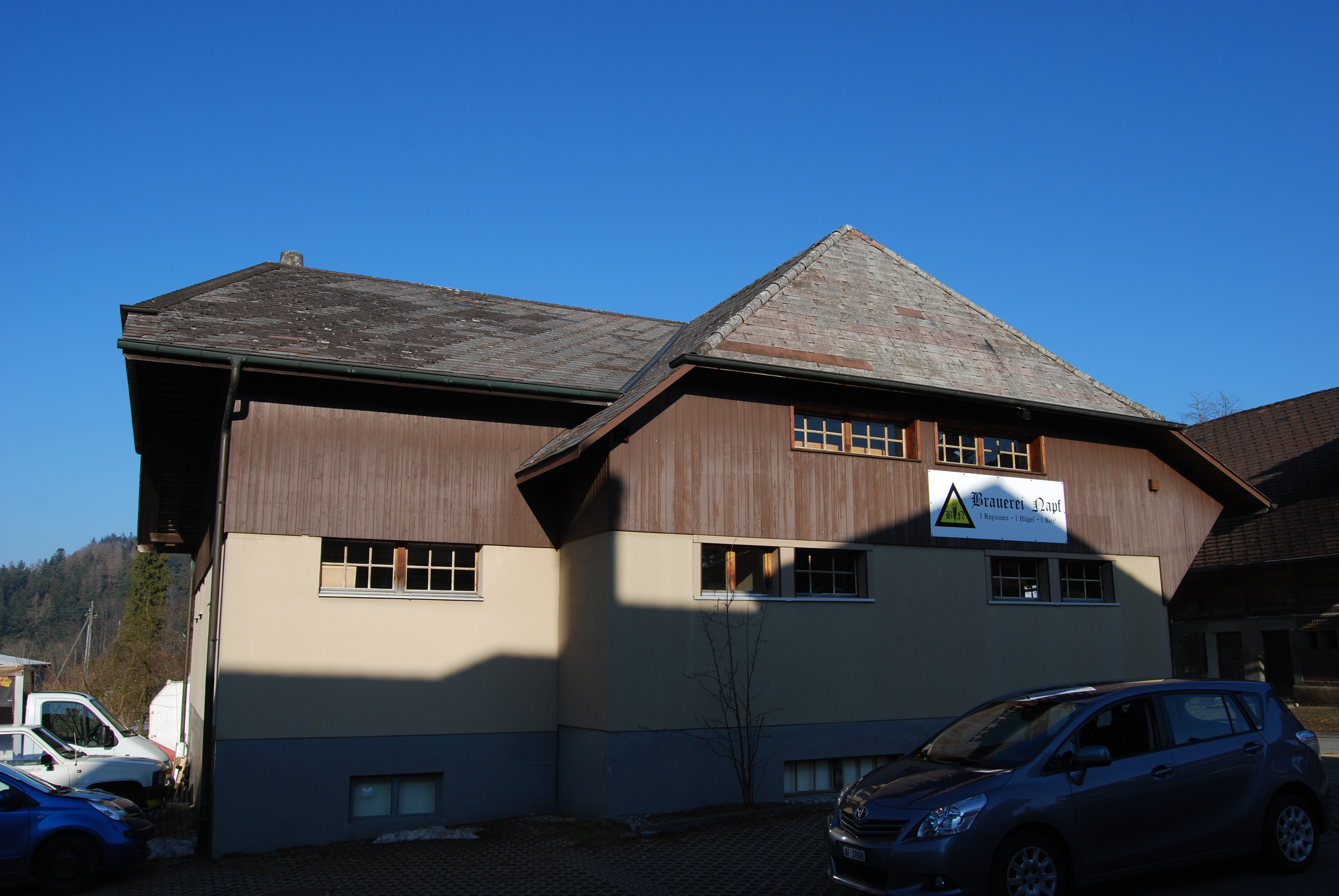
Napf brewery in Walterswil

As of 2011, Walterswil had an unemployment rate of 0.33%. As of 2011, there were a total of 214 people employed in the municipality. Of these, there were 141 people employed in the primary economic sector and about 54 businesses involved in this sector. The secondary sector employs 22 people and there were 6 businesses in this sector. The tertiary sector employs 51 people, with 16 businesses in this sector. There were 298 residents of the municipality who were employed in some capacity, of which females made up 40.6% of the workforce.

In 2008 there were a total of 162 full-time equivalent jobs. The number of jobs in the primary sector was 88, all of which were in agriculture. The number of jobs in the secondary sector was 17 of which 9 or (52.9%) were in manufacturing and 8 (47.1%) were in construction. The number of jobs in the tertiary sector was 57. In the tertiary sector; 7 or 12.3% were in wholesale or retail sales or the repair of motor vehicles, 3 or 5.3% were in the movement and storage of goods, 6 or 10.5% were in a hotel or restaurant, 5 or 8.8% were in education.

In 2000, there were 15 workers who commuted into the municipality and 156 workers who commuted away. The municipality is a net exporter of workers, with about 10.4 workers leaving the municipality for every one entering. A total of 142 workers (90.4% of the 157 total workers in the municipality) both lived and worked in Walterswil. Of the working population, 3.4% used public transportation to get to work, and 55.4% used a private car.

In 2013 the average church, local and cantonal tax rate on a married resident, with two children, of Walterswil making 150,000 CHF was 11.9%, while an unmarried resident's rate was 18.3%. For comparison, the median rate for all municipalities in the entire canton was 11.7% and 18.1%, while the nationwide median was 10.6% and 17.4% respectively.

In 2011 there were a total of 181 tax payers in the municipality. Of that total, 32 made over 75,000 CHF per year. There was one person who made between 15,000 and 20,000 per year. The greatest number of workers, 49, made between 40,000 and 50,000 CHF per year. The average income of the over 75,000 CHF group in Walterswil was 106,072 CHF, while the average across all of Switzerland was 136,785 CHF.

In 2011 a total of 2.7% of the population received direct financial assistance from the government.

== Politics ==
In the 2011 federal election the most popular party was the Swiss People's Party (SVP) which received 59.8% of the vote. The next three most popular parties were the Conservative Democratic Party (BDP) (13.6%), the Social Democratic Party (SP) (6.5%) and the Evangelical People's Party (EVP) (4.6%). In the federal election, a total of 230 votes were cast, and the voter turnout was 52.2%.

== Religion ==
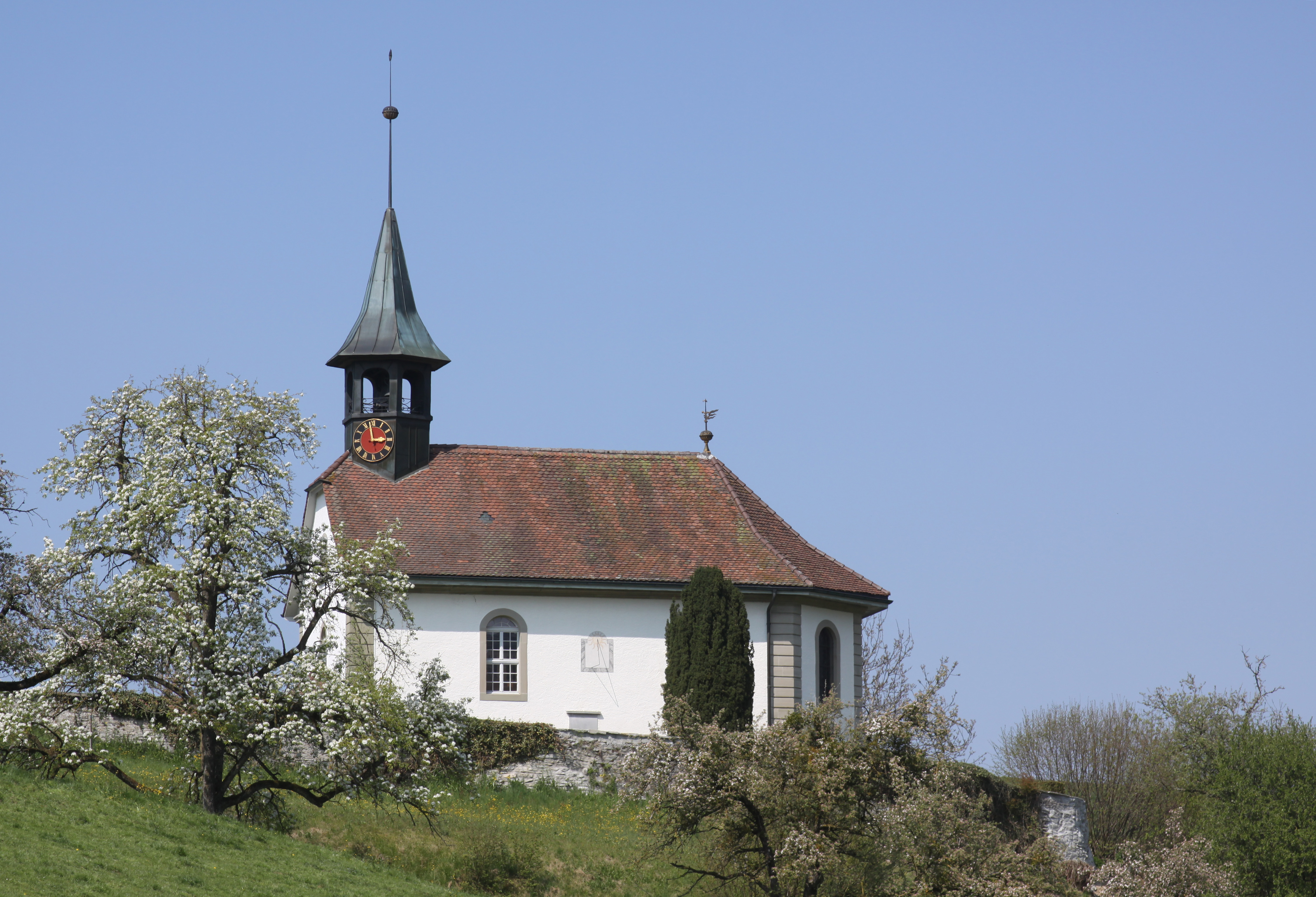
Village church of Walterswil

From the 2000 census, 506 or 92.7% belonged to the Swiss Reformed Church, while 3 or 0.5% were Roman Catholic. Of the rest of the population, there were 4 individuals (or about 0.73% of the population) who belonged to another Christian church. 5 (or about 0.92% of the population) belonged to no church, are agnostic or atheist, and 28 individuals (or about 5.13% of the population) did not answer the question.

== Education ==
In Walterswil about 57.9% of the population have completed non-mandatory upper secondary education, and 12.2% have completed additional higher education (either university or a Fachhochschule). Of the 41 who had completed some form of tertiary schooling listed in the census, 73.2% were Swiss men, 26.8% were Swiss women.

The Canton of Bern school system provides one year of non-obligatory Kindergarten, followed by six years of Primary school. This is followed by three years of obligatory lower Secondary school where the students are separated according to ability and aptitude. Following the lower Secondary students may attend additional schooling or they may enter an apprenticeship.

During the 2012-13 school year, there were a total of 69 students attending classes in Walterswil. There were a total of 13 students in the German language kindergarten classes in the municipality. The municipality's primary school had 33 students in German language classes. Of the primary students, 6.1% were permanent or temporary residents of Switzerland (not citizens). During the same year, the lower secondary schools in neighboring municipalities had a total of 23 students from Walterswil.

As of 2000, there were a total of 41 students attending any school in the municipality. Of those, 38 both lived and attended school in the municipality, while 3 students came from another municipality. During the same year, 31 residents attended schools outside the municipality.
