= Ursenbach =

- Municipality
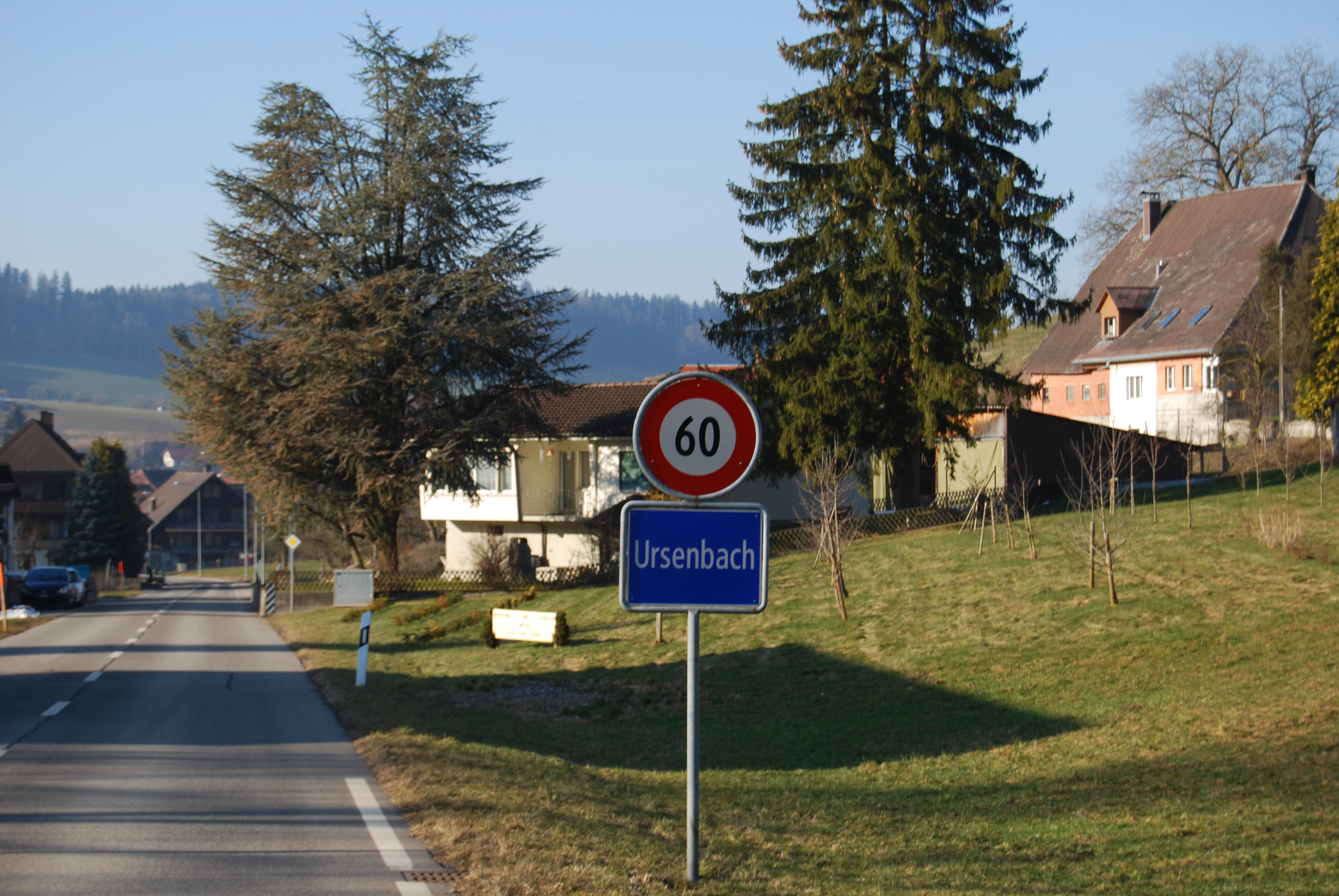

- Flag Coat of arms
- Location of Ursenbach
- Location within Switzerland Location within Canton of Bern
- Coordinates: 47°8′N 7°46′E
- Country: Switzerland
- Canton: Bern
- District: Oberaargau

Area
  - Total: 9.2 km^{2} (3.6 sq mi)
- Elevation: 582 m (1,909 ft)

Population (December 2020)
  - Total: 881
  - Density: 96/km^{2} (250/sq mi)
- Time zone: UTC+01:00 (CET)
  - Summer (DST): UTC+02:00 (CEST)
- Postal code: 4937
- SFOS number: 344
- ISO 3166 code: CH-BE
- Surrounded by: Kleindietwil, Leimiswil, Ochlenberg, Oeschenbach, Rohrbachgraben, Walterswil
- Website: www.ursenbach.ch

Ursenbach is a municipality in the Oberaargau administrative district in the canton of Bern in Switzerland.

== History ==
Ursenbach is first mentioned in 1201 as Ursibach.

During the Middle Ages the major landholders in Ursenbach were the Lords of Aarwangen and Rüegsau Priory. The low court, known as the Amt of Ursenbach, was held by the Kyburg counts. In the 14th century, the Amt went to the Grünenberg counts. Between 1407 and 1414, Bern acquired the entire Amt from the Counts. They incorporated it into the Wangen bailiwick. Following the 1798 French invasion, under the Helvetic Republic, it was part of the district of Langenthal. After the collapse of the Republic, in 1803, it went to Wangen district again. In 1884, the village became part of the district of Aarwangen.

The first village church was built during the 8th century, though no records of this first building exist. The next church was first mentioned in 1201 and the current church dates from 1515. The Heiligkreuz chapel in Lünisberg was first mentioned in 1479. During the Protestant Reformation, the chapel was completely demolished.

During the 18th and 19th centuries, cottage industry linen weaving and straw plaiting began to supplement agriculture in the local economy. A savings bank opened in the village in 1854. During the early 20th century agriculture became increasingly mechanized, requiring fewer farm workers. This was partly offset by more jobs in construction and tourism, but many residents had to emigrate for jobs.

The municipality has its own primary school, and is part of the secondary school district of Kleindietwil.

== Geography ==
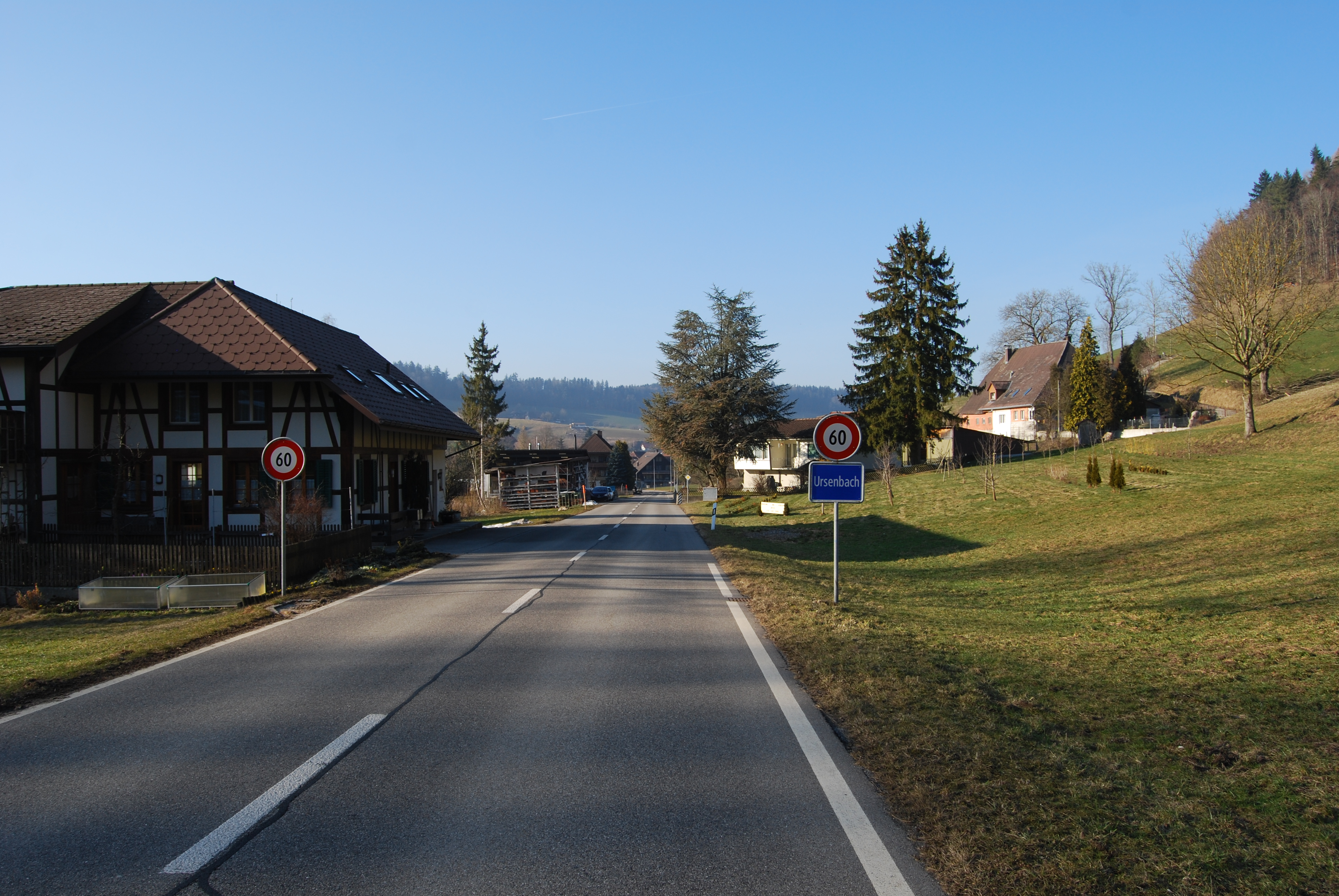
Village entrance and countryside around Ursenbach

Ursenbach has an area of 9.17 km^{2} (3.54 sq mi). Of this area, 5.74 km^{2} (2.22 mi^{2}) or 62.8% is used for agricultural purposes, while 2.84 km^{2} (1.10 mi^{2}) or 31.1% is forested. Of the rest of the land, 0.53 km^{2} (0.20 mi^{2}) or 5.8% is settled (buildings or roads), 0.02 km^{2} (4.9 acres) or 0.2% is either rivers or lakes.

Of the built-up area, housing and buildings made up 3.1% and transportation infrastructure made up 1.9%. Out of the forested land, 28.9% of the total land area is heavily forested and 2.2% is covered with orchards or small clusters of trees. Of the agricultural land, 24.2% is used for growing crops and 36.1% is pastures, while 2.5% is used for orchards or vine crops. All the water in the municipality is flowing water.

The municipality is located in the Oberaargau region. It consists of the village of Ursenbach with the old church, the upper and lower village sections and the hamlets of Hirseren, Richisberg, Lünisberg and Hofen as well as scattered farm houses throughout the hilly landscape. In 1888-89 Ursenbach gave up the settlement of Hubbergviertel (population 220) to Dürrenroth and Walterswil and in return got Richisberg (population 43) from Oeschenbach and Lünisberg (population 118) from Wynigen.

On 31 December 2009 Amtsbezirk Aarwangen, the municipality's former district, was dissolved. On the following day, 1 January 2010, it joined the newly created Verwaltungskreis Oberaargau.

== Coat of arms ==
The blazon of the municipal coat of arms is Gules a Bend wavy Argent over a Mount of 3 Coupeaux Vert. The wavy line represents a stream or brook (German: Bach).

== Demographics ==
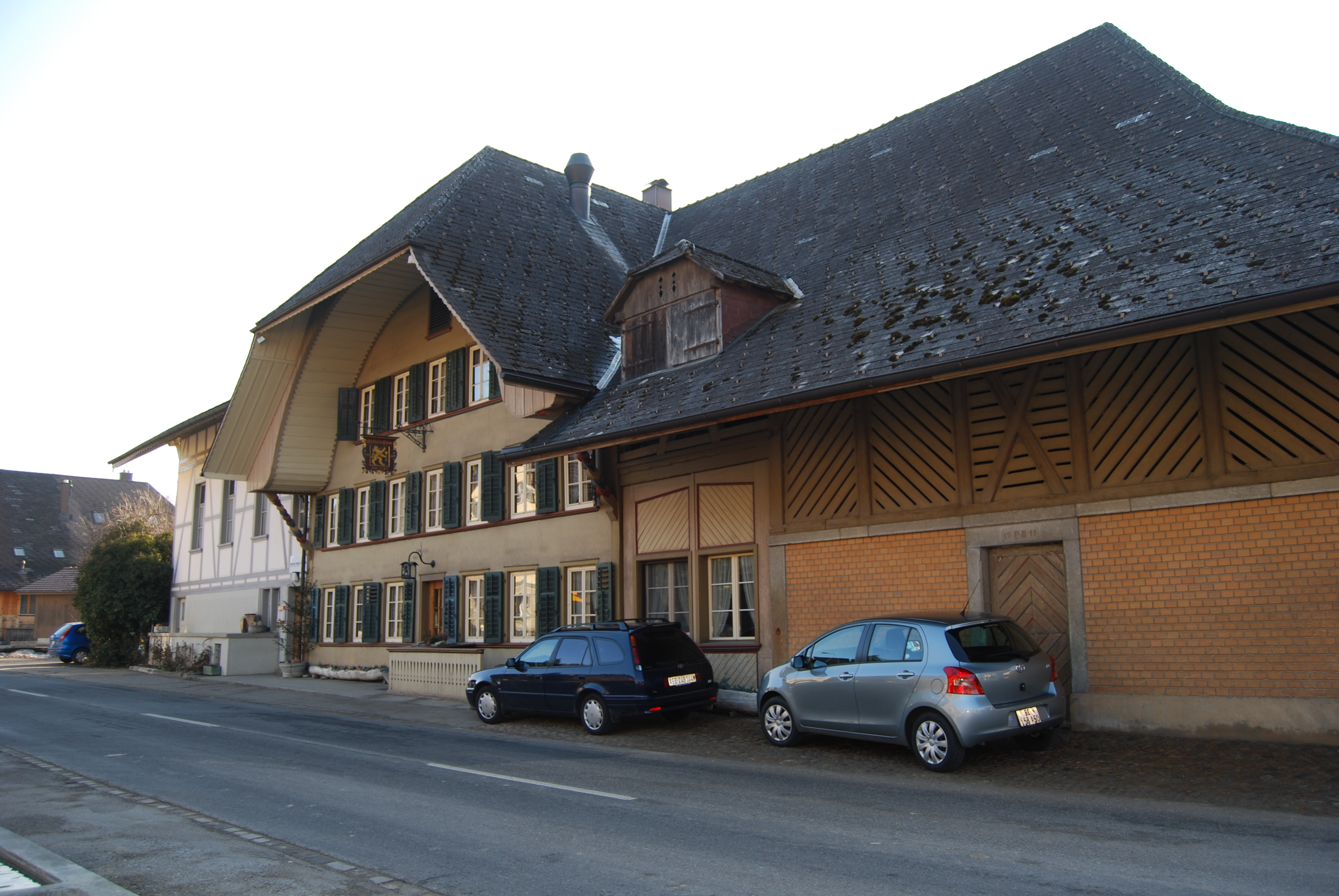
A house with attached barn

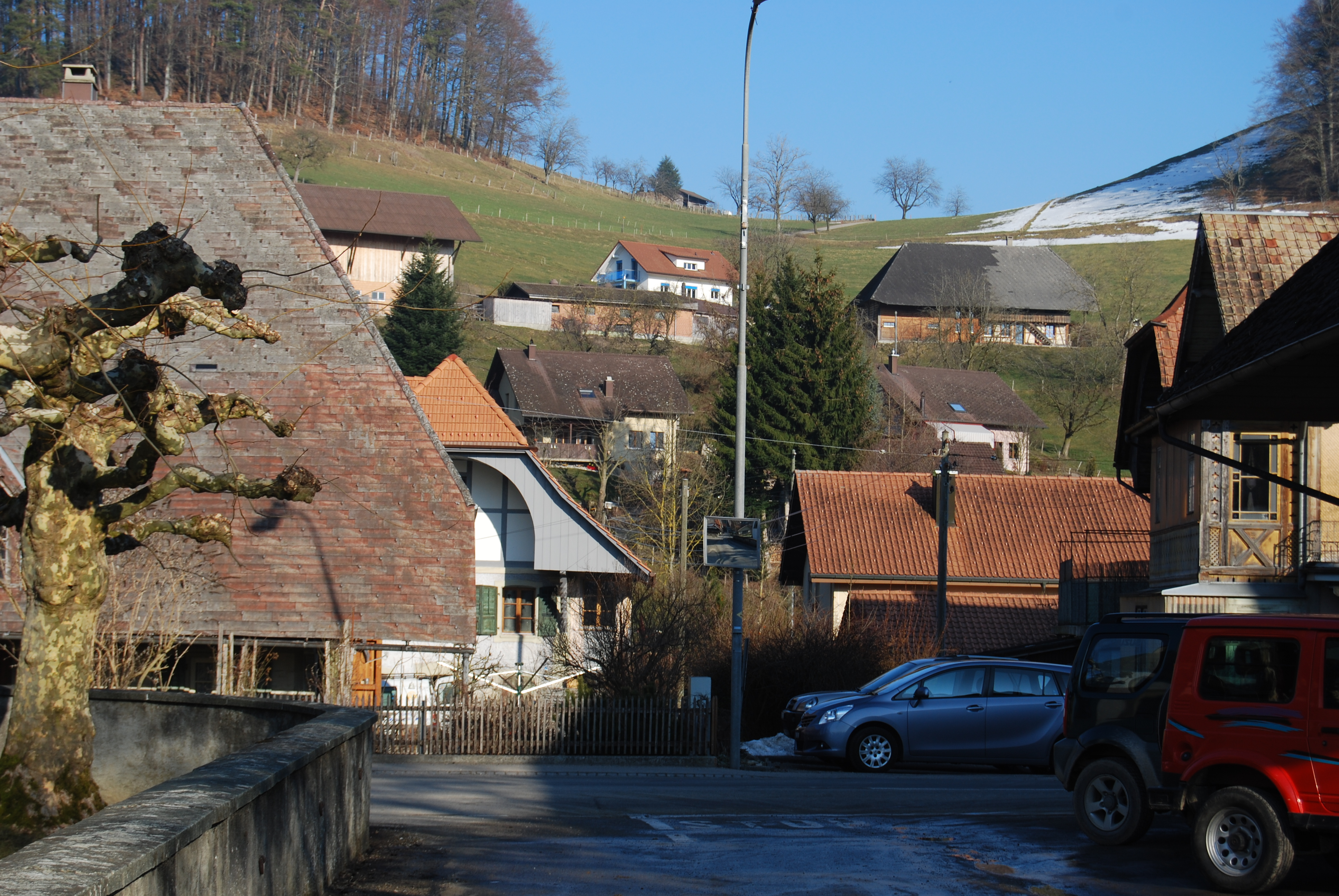
Houses in Ursenbach

Ursenbach has a population (as of December 2020) of 881. As of 2010, 3.5% of the population are resident foreign nationals. Over the last 10 years (2000-2010) the population has changed at a rate of 1.3%. Migration accounted for 0.7%, while births and deaths accounted for -1.3%.

Most of the population (as of 2000) speaks German (887 or 98.6%) as their first language, Serbo-Croatian is the second most common (6 or 0.7%) while French and Italian are the third, each with 2 people.

As of 2008, the population was 48.1% male and 51.9% female. The population was made up of 428 Swiss men (46.0% of the population) and 19 (2.0%) non-Swiss men. There were 469 Swiss women (50.4%) and 14 (1.5%) non-Swiss women. Of the population in the municipality, 415 or about 46.1% were born in Ursenbach and lived there in 2000. There were 363 or 40.3% who were born in the same canton, while 73 or 8.1% were born somewhere else in Switzerland, and 26 or 2.9% were born outside of Switzerland.

As of 2010, children and teenagers (0–19 years old) make up 24.8% of the population, while adults (20–64 years old) make up 57% and seniors (over 64 years old) make up 18.2%.

As of 2000, there were 373 people who were single and never married in the municipality. There were 464 married individuals, 52 widows or widowers and 11 individuals who are divorced.

As of 2000, there were 87 households that consist of only one person and 37 households with five or more people. In 2000, a total of 318 apartments (84.8% of the total) were permanently occupied, while 37 apartments (9.9%) were seasonally occupied and 20 apartments (5.3%) were empty. The vacancy rate for the municipality, in 2011, was 0.69%.

The historical population is given in the following chart:

== Politics ==
In the 2011 federal election the most popular party was the SVP which received 48.6% of the vote. The next three most popular parties were the BDP Party (20.4%), the SPS (7.5%) and the EDU Party (4.7%). In the federal election, a total of 326 votes were cast, and the voter turnout was 46.5%.

== Economy ==
As of 2011, Ursenbach had an unemployment rate of 0.71%. As of 2008, there were a total of 355 people employed in the municipality. Of these, there were 123 people employed in the primary economic sector and about 48 businesses involved in this sector. 164 people were employed in the secondary sector and there were 12 businesses in this sector. 68 people were employed in the tertiary sector, with 19 businesses in this sector.

In 2008 there were a total of 283 full-time equivalent jobs. The number of jobs in the primary sector was 78, all of which were in agriculture. The number of jobs in the secondary sector was 153 of which 119 or (77.8%) were in manufacturing and 34 (22.2%) were in construction. The number of jobs in the tertiary sector was 52. In the tertiary sector, 20 or 38.5% were in wholesale or retail sales or the repair of motor vehicles, 6 or 11.5% were in the movement and storage of goods, 18 or 34.6% were in a hotel or restaurant.

In 2000, there were 221 workers who commuted into the municipality and 260 workers who commuted away. The municipality is a net exporter of workers, with about 1.2 workers leaving the municipality for every one entering. Of the working population, 6.9% used public transportation to get to work, and 49.6% used a private car.

== Religion ==
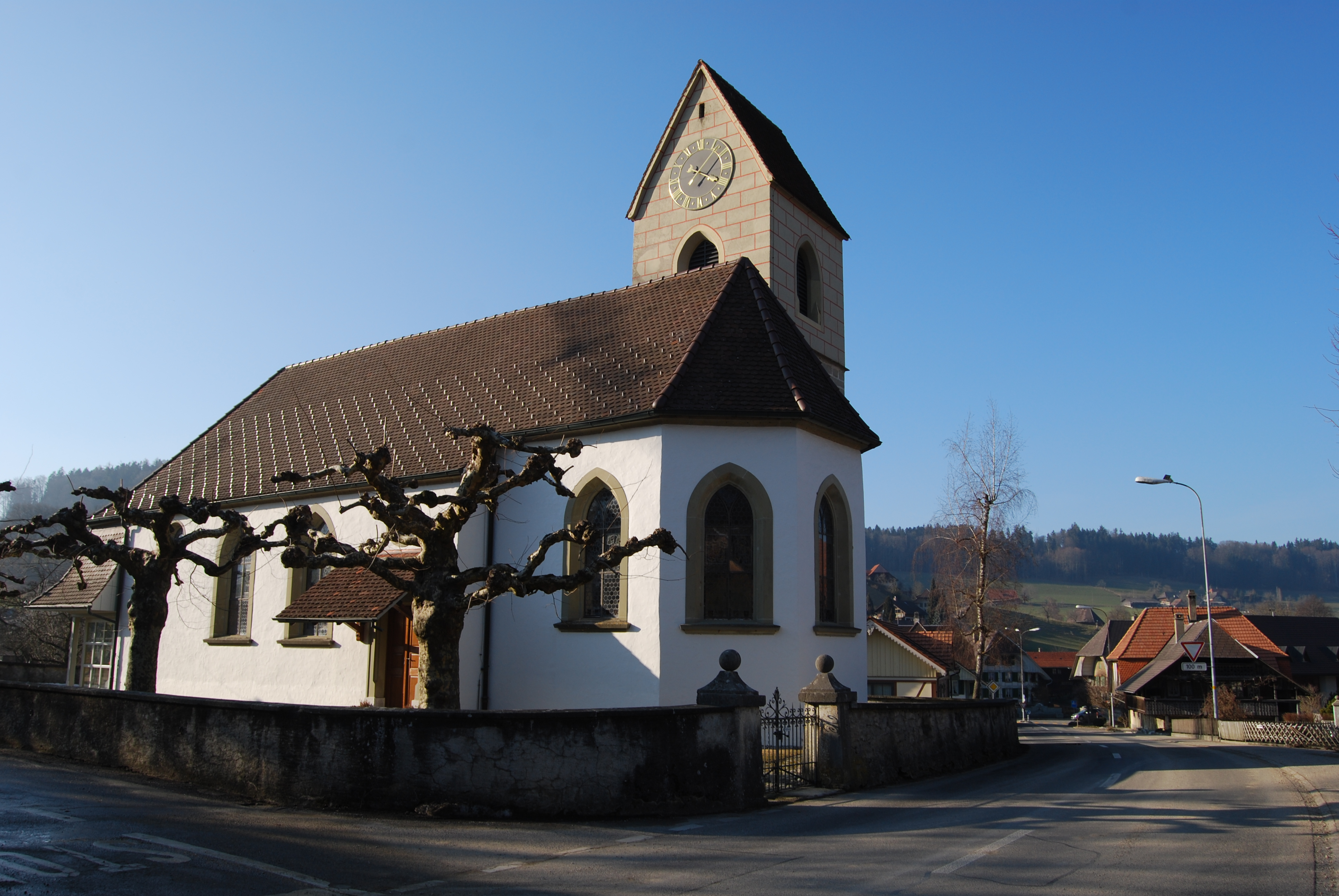
Village church

From the 2000 census, 43 or 4.8% were Roman Catholic, while 780 or 86.7% belonged to the Swiss Reformed Church. Of the rest of the population, there were 2 individuals (or about 0.22% of the population) who belonged to the Christian Catholic Church, and there were 44 individuals (or about 4.89% of the population) who belonged to another Christian church. There was 1 individual who was Jewish, and there was 1 individual who was Islamic. There was 1 person who was Hindu. 32 (or about 3.56% of the population) belonged to no church, are agnostic or atheist, and 17 individuals (or about 1.89% of the population) did not answer the question.

== Education ==
In Ursenbach about 363 or (40.3%) of the population have completed non-mandatory upper secondary education, and 88 or (9.8%) have completed additional higher education (either university or a Fachhochschule). Of the 88 who completed tertiary schooling, 77.3% were Swiss men, 19.3% were Swiss women.

The Canton of Bern school system provides one year of non-obligatory Kindergarten, followed by six years of Primary school. This is followed by three years of obligatory lower Secondary school where the students are separated according to ability and aptitude. Following the lower Secondary students may attend additional schooling or they may enter an apprenticeship.

During the 2009-10 school year, there were a total of 105 students attending classes in Ursenbach. There was one kindergarten class with a total of 18 students in the municipality. The municipality had 4 primary classes and 74 students. During the same year, there was one lower secondary class with a total of 13 students. There were 15.4% who were permanent or temporary residents of Switzerland (not citizens).

As of 2000, there were 107 students from Ursenbach who attended schools outside the municipality.
