= Rohrbachgraben =

- Municipality
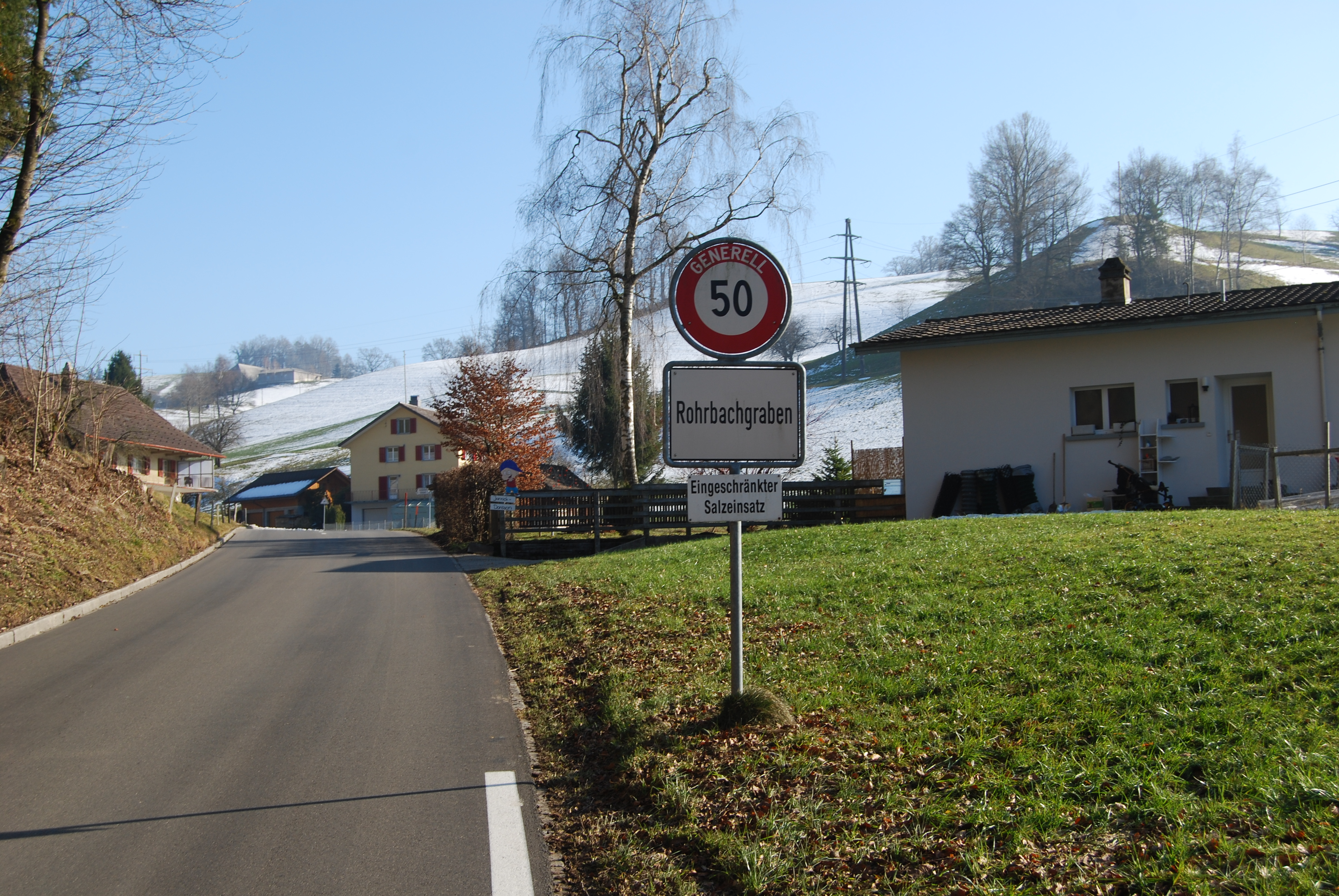
- Rohrbachgraben village

- Flag Coat of arms
- Location of Rohrbachgraben
- Location within Switzerland Location within Canton of Bern
- Coordinates: 47°7′N 7°48′E
- Country: Switzerland
- Canton: Bern
- District: Oberaargau

Area
  - Total: 6.5 km^{2} (2.5 sq mi)
- Elevation: 634 m (2,080 ft)

Population (December 2020)
  - Total: 390
  - Density: 60/km^{2} (160/sq mi)
- Time zone: UTC+01:00 (CET)
  - Summer (DST): UTC+02:00 (CEST)
- Postal code: 4938
- SFOS number: 339
- ISO 3166 code: CH-BE
- Surrounded by: Dürrenroth, Huttwil, Kleindietwil, Rohrbach, Ursenbach, Walterswil
- Website: https://www.rohrbachgraben.ch SFSO statistics

Rohrbachgraben is a municipality in the Oberaargau administrative district in the canton of Bern in Switzerland.

== History ==
Rohrbachgraben was a municipality created out of widely scattered settlements and farms around the Rohrbach stream. Until the modern era it was politically part of the village of Rohrbach. During the Middle Ages the entire region was part of a district of the land owned by the Abbey of St. Gall.

Agriculture still dominates the local economy. In 2009 there were still over 40 active farms in the municipality.

The municipality has its own primary school district. It is part of the Kleindietwil secondary school district.

== Geography ==
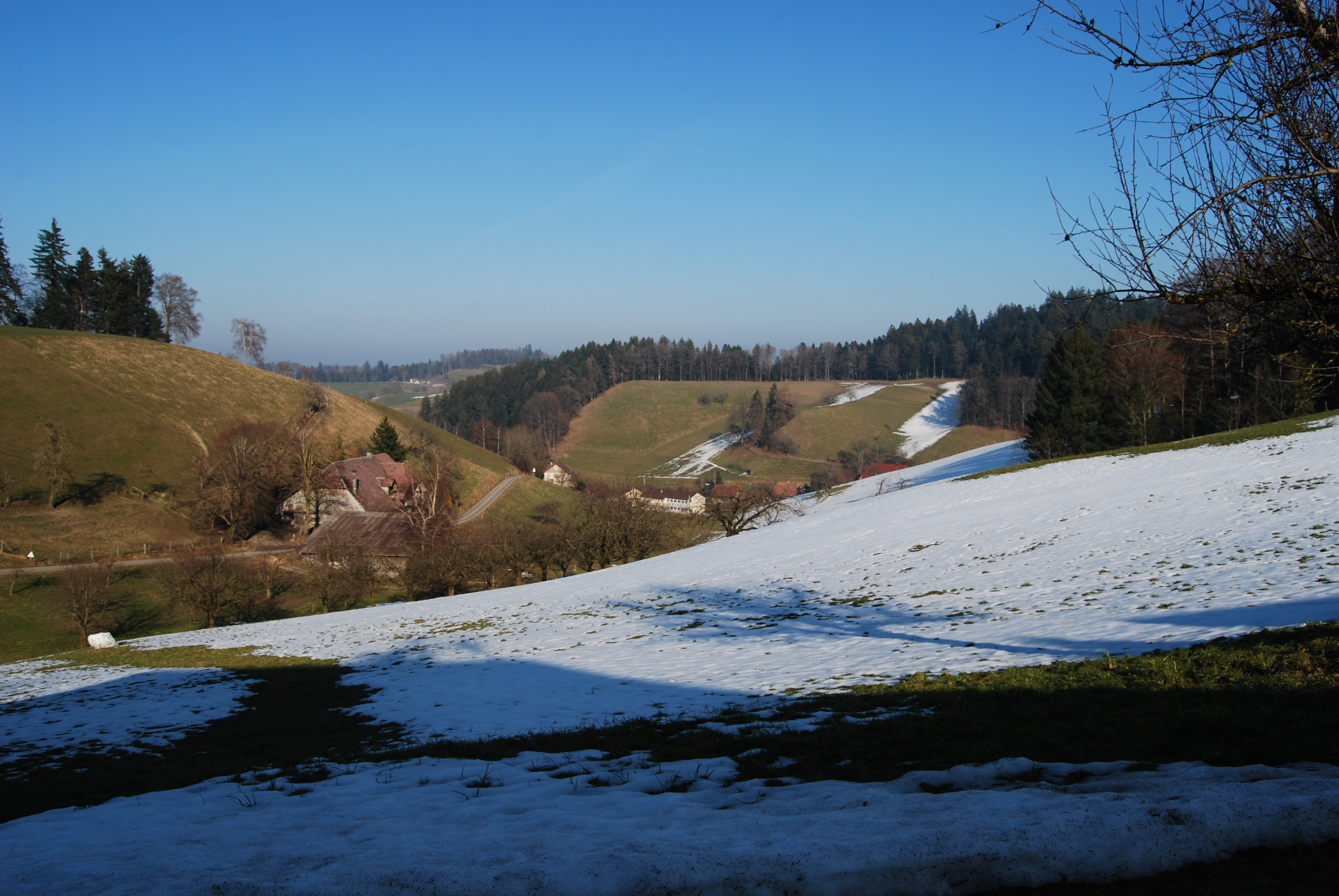
Farms in Rohrbachgraben

Rohrbachgraben has an area of 6.46 km^{2} (2.49 sq mi). Of this area, 4.48 km^{2} (1.73 mi^{2}) or 69.1% is used for agricultural purposes, while 1.8 km^{2} (0.69 mi^{2}) or 27.8% is forested. Of the rest of the land, 0.19 km^{2} (0.073 mi^{2}) or 2.9% is settled (buildings or roads), 0.01 km^{2} (2.5 acres) or 0.2% is either rivers or lakes.

Of the built up area, housing and buildings made up 1.7% and transportation infrastructure made up 1.1%. Out of the forested land, all of the forested land area is covered with heavy forests. Of the agricultural land, 19.4% is used for growing crops and 47.4% is pastures, while 2.3% is used for orchards or vine crops. All the water in the municipality is flowing water.

The municipality is a widely scattered collection of small farms and settlements without a central village. It consists of the hamlets and farm houses of Flückigen, Gansenberg, Glasbach, Kaltenegg, Liemberg, Matten, Wald and Wil.

On 31 December 2009 Amtsbezirk Aarwangen, the municipality's former district, was dissolved. On the following day, 1 January 2010, it joined the newly created Verwaltungskreis Oberaargau.

== Coat of arms ==
The blazon of the municipal coat of arms is Impalled Argent a Bear rampant to sinister Sable langued and viriled Gules and Vert a Bar wavy of the first. The wavy line symbolizes both the stream (German: bach) and the channel (German: graben).

== Demographics ==
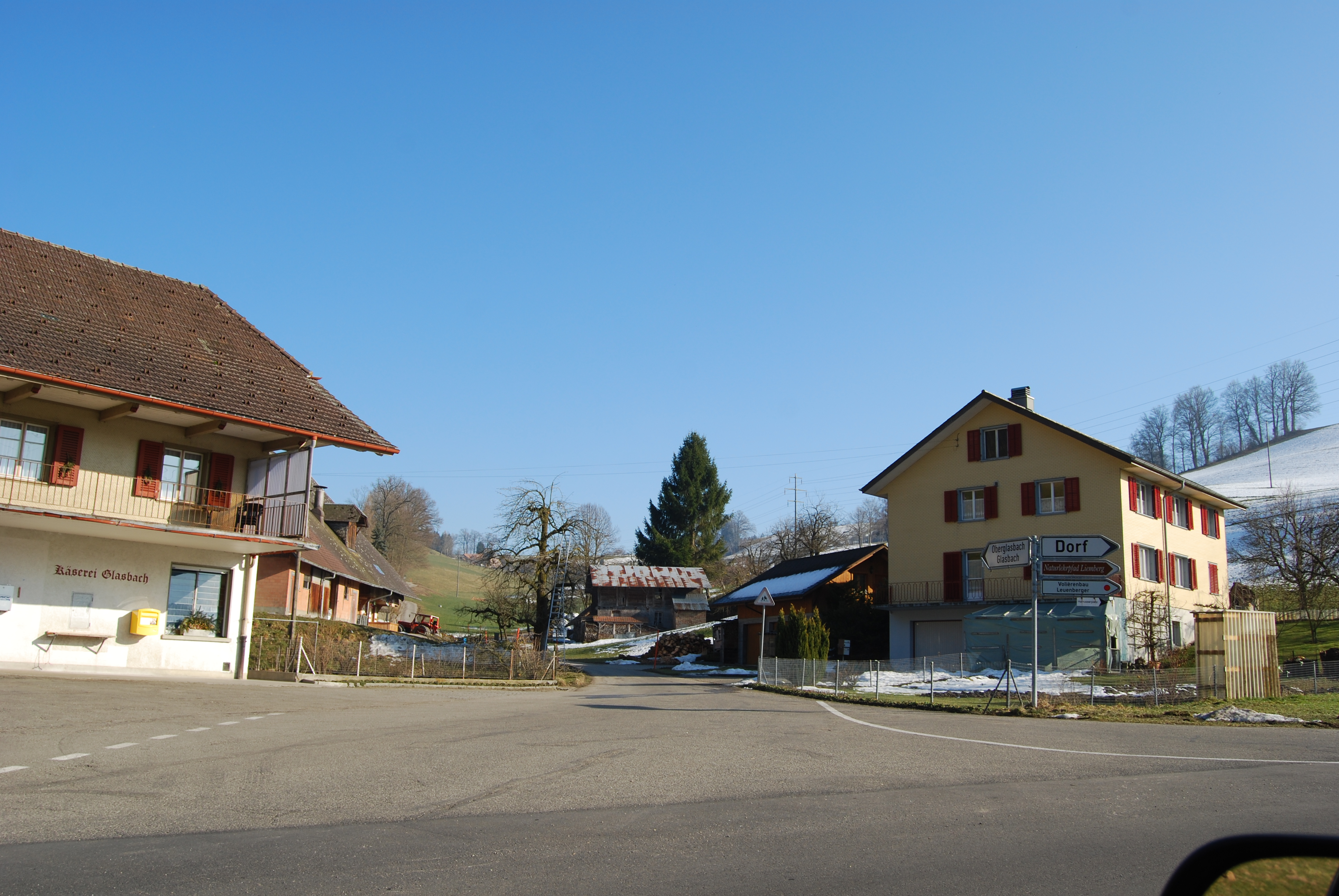
Houses and shops in Rohrbachgraben

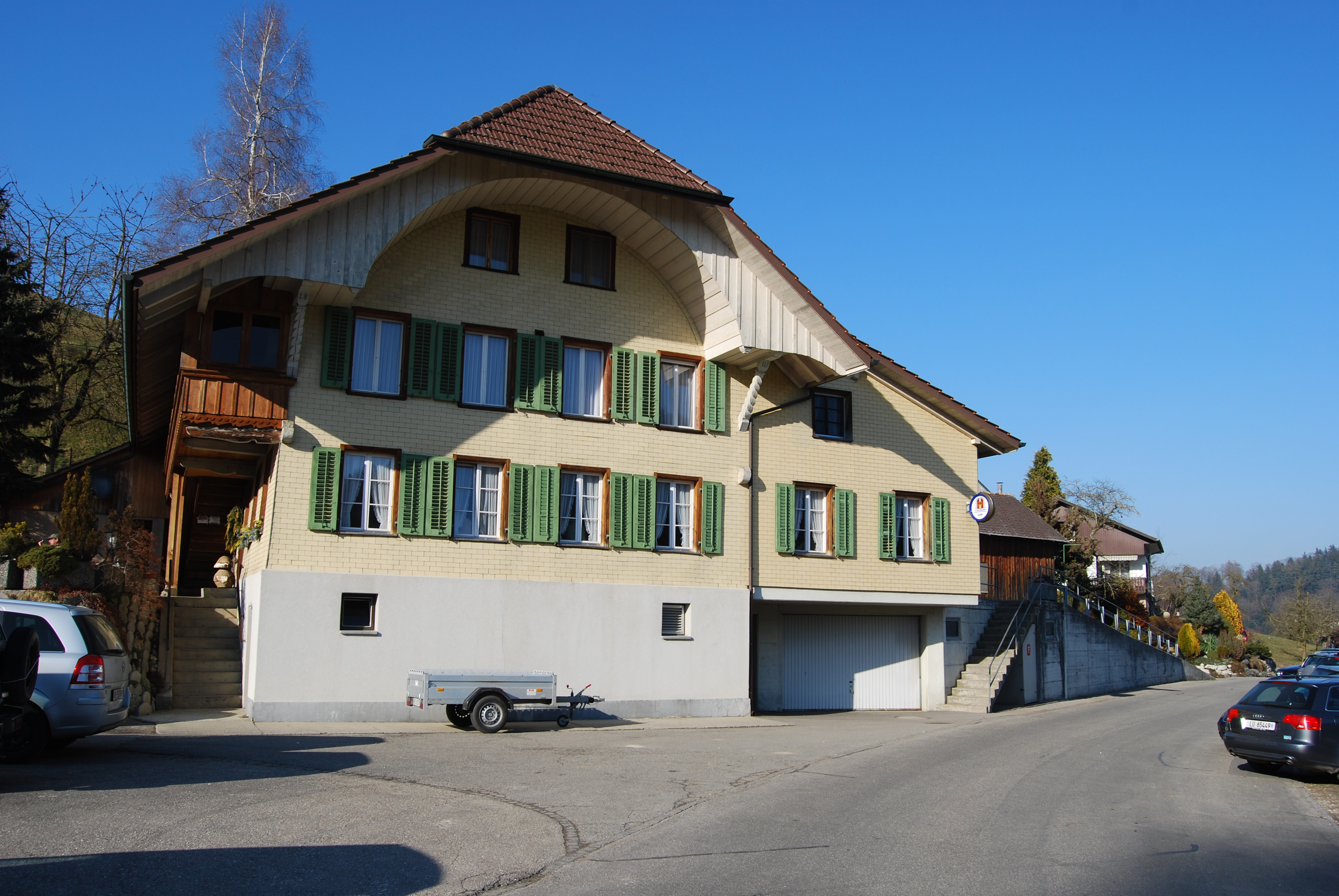
House in Rohrbachgraben

Rohrbachgraben has a population (as of December 2020) of 390. As of 2010, 2.3% of the population are resident foreign nationals. Over the last 10 years (2000-2010) the population has changed at a rate of -8.5%. Migration accounted for -3.3%, while births and deaths accounted for -2.2%.

Most of the population (as of 2000) speaks German (432 or 99.1%) as their first language, with the rest speaking Albanian.

As of 2008, the population was 50.5% male and 49.5% female. The population was made up of 211 Swiss men (49.3% of the population) and 5 (1.2%) non-Swiss men. There were 207 Swiss women (48.4%) and 5 (1.2%) non-Swiss women. Of the population in the municipality, 240 or about 55.0% were born in Rohrbachgraben and lived there in 2000. There were 148 or 33.9% who were born in the same canton, while 33 or 7.6% were born somewhere else in Switzerland, and 8 or 1.8% were born outside of Switzerland.

As of 2010, children and teenagers (0–19 years old) make up 27.8% of the population, while adults (20–64 years old) make up 56.8% and seniors (over 64 years old) make up 15.4%.

As of 2000, there were 204 people who were single and never married in the municipality. There were 206 married individuals, 22 widows or widowers and 4 individuals who are divorced.

As of 2000, there were 31 households that consist of only one person and 32 households with five or more people. In 2000, a total of 132 apartments (87.4% of the total) were permanently occupied, while 12 apartments (7.9%) were seasonally occupied and 7 apartments (4.6%) were empty. The vacancy rate for the municipality, in 2011, was 2.42%.

The historical population is given in the following chart:

== Politics ==
In the 2011 federal election the most popular party was the SVP which received 37.6% of the vote. The next three most popular parties were the EDU Party (19.3%), the BDP Party (18.3%) and the EVP Party (16.2%). In the federal election, a total of 190 votes were cast, and the voter turnout was 58.6%.

== Economy ==
As of 2011, Rohrbachgraben had an unemployment rate of 1.02%. As of 2008, there were a total of 143 people employed in the municipality. Of these, there were 102 people employed in the primary economic sector and about 36 businesses involved in this sector. 9 people were employed in the secondary sector and there were 3 businesses in this sector. 32 people were employed in the tertiary sector, with 8 businesses in this sector.

In 2008 there were a total of 97 full-time equivalent jobs. The number of jobs in the primary sector was 63, all of which were in agriculture. The number of jobs in the secondary sector was 9, all of which were in manufacturing. The number of jobs in the tertiary sector was 25. In the tertiary sector; 11 or 44.0% were in wholesale or retail sales or the repair of motor vehicles, 2 or 8.0% were in a hotel or restaurant, 3 or 12.0% were technical professionals or scientists and 6 or 24.0% were in education.

In 2000, there were 23 workers who commuted into the municipality and 119 workers who commuted away. The municipality is a net exporter of workers, with about 5.2 workers leaving the municipality for every one entering. Of the working population, 6.6% used public transportation to get to work, and 44.1% used a private car.

== Religion ==
From the 2000 census, 11 or 2.5% were Roman Catholic, while 374 or 85.8% belonged to the Swiss Reformed Church. Of the rest of the population, there were 80 individuals (or about 18.35% of the population) who belonged to another Christian church. There were 4 (or about 0.92% of the population) who were Islamic. 4 (or about 0.92% of the population) belonged to no church, are agnostic or atheist, and 3 individuals (or about 0.69% of the population) did not answer the question.

== Education ==
In Rohrbachgraben about 152 or (34.9%) of the population have completed non-mandatory upper secondary education, and 30 or (6.9%) have completed additional higher education (either university or a Fachhochschule). Of the 30 who completed tertiary schooling, 73.3% were Swiss men, 26.7% were Swiss women.

The Canton of Bern school system provides one year of non-obligatory Kindergarten, followed by six years of Primary school. This is followed by three years of obligatory lower Secondary school where the students are separated according to ability and aptitude. Following the lower Secondary students may attend additional schooling or they may enter an apprenticeship.

During the 2009-10 school year, there were a total of 55 students attending classes in Rohrbachgraben. There was one kindergarten class with a total of 14 students in the municipality. Of the kindergarten students, 7.1% were permanent or temporary residents of Switzerland (not citizens) and 7.1% have a different mother language than the classroom language. The municipality had 2 primary classes and 41 students.

As of 2000, there were 7 students in Rohrbachgraben who came from another municipality, while 31 residents attended schools outside the municipality.
