= Dürrenroth =

- Municipality
- Flag Coat of arms
- Location of Dürrenroth
- Location within Switzerland Location within Canton of Bern
- Coordinates: 47°5′N 7°47′E
- Country: Switzerland
- Canton: Bern
- District: Emmental

Government
  - Executive: Gemeinderat with 7 members
  - Mayor: Gemeindepräsident(in); Ernst Kiener (as of 2026)

Area
  - Total: 14.1 km^{2} (5.4 sq mi)
- Elevation: 698 m (2,290 ft)

Population (December 2020)
  - Total: 1,052
  - Density: 74.6/km^{2} (193/sq mi)
- Time zone: UTC+01:00 (CET)
  - Summer (DST): UTC+02:00 (CEST)
- Postal code: 3465
- SFOS number: 952
- ISO 3166 code: CH-BE
- Surrounded by: Affoltern im Emmental, Huttwil, Rohrbachgraben, Sumiswald, Walterswil, Wyssachen
- Twin towns: Klenčí pod Čerchovem (Czech Republic)
- Website: https://duerrenroth.ch/

Dürrenroth is a municipality in the district of Trachselwald in the Swiss canton of Bern.

== History ==
Aerial view (1950)

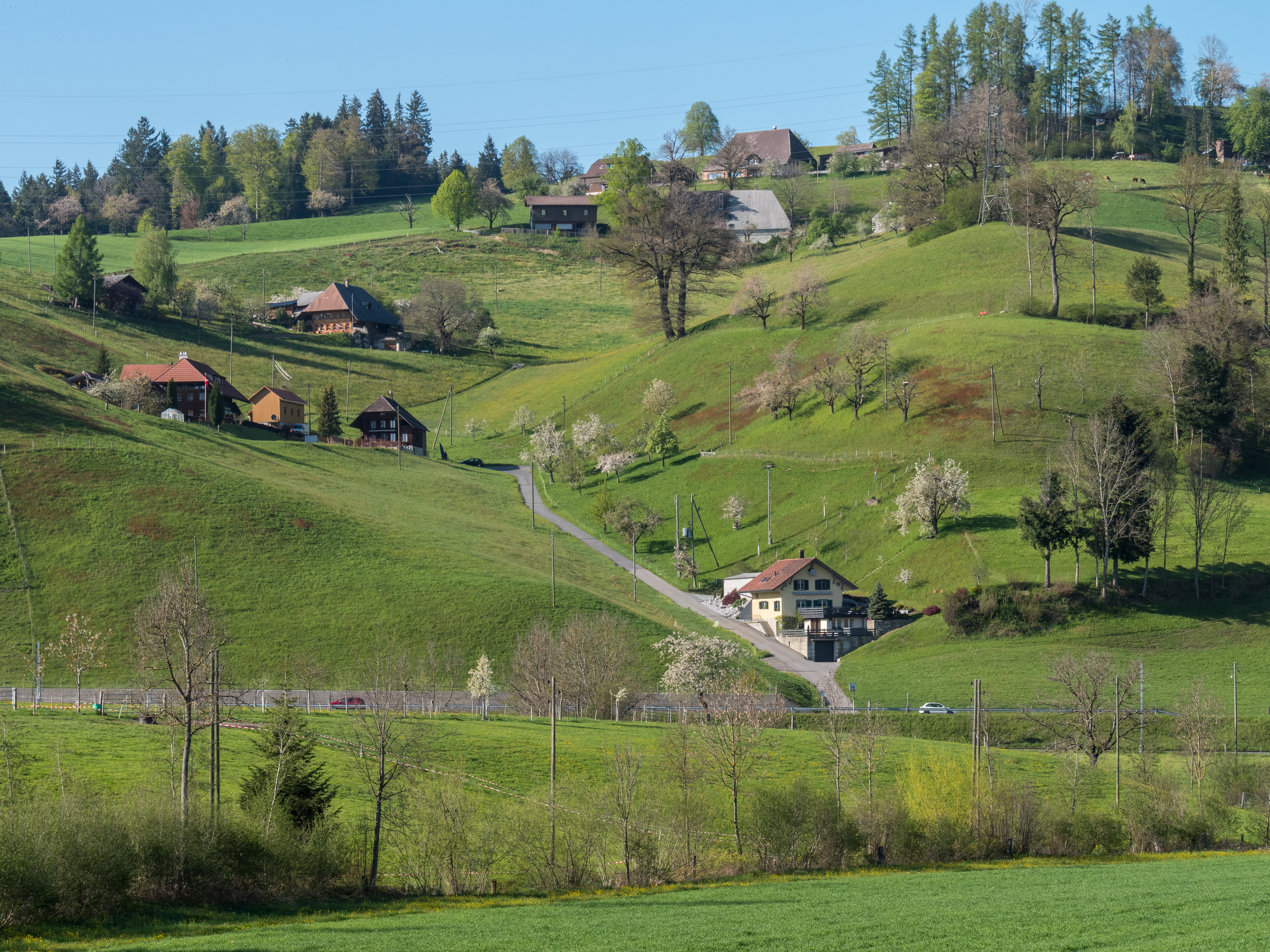
Emmental countryside near Dürrenroth

Dürrenroth is first mentioned in 1275 as Rota. In 1326 it was mentioned as Durren Rot.

The area was probably first settled in the Late Middle Ages by a few, scattered farmers. In 1312 the Herrschaft of Balm, which include modern Dürrenroth, was donated to the Teutonic Knights' Sumiswald Commandry. In 1431 the village was given to the Bernese city of Burgdorf. About a century later, in 1528, Bern adopted the new faith of the Protestant Reformation. Despite opposition from the villagers, Dürrenroth was forcibly converted in the same year. In 1698 Bern finally bought the last property and rights over the village from the Teutonic Knights and it fully became a part of the Canton of Bern. Following the collapse of the Helvetic Republic and 1803 Act of Mediation it joined the newly created Trachselwald District.

The village church of St. Lawrence was built in 1486. Its current appearance dates from renovations in the 18th and 19th centuries.

During the 19th century many of the local farmers banded together to form dairy and cheese making co-ops. Throughout the 20th century agriculture remained important and as of 1990 there were still six active dairy cooperatives with three cheese factories. A road was built through the Rothbach valley in 1875, which connected Dürrenroth with nearby towns. The Ramsei-Sumiswald-Huttwil railroad opened a station in the municipality in 1908. Today while agriculture remains important, many residents work in construction or wood working or commute to jobs in neighboring towns.

There are three primary school houses in the municipality; in Dürrenroth, Hubbach and Gassen. Secondary students attend class in Walterswil.

== Geography ==
Dürrenroth has an area of 14.13 km^{2} (5.46 sq mi). As of the 2006 survey, a total of 9.96 km^{2} (3.85 mi^{2}) or 70.5% is used for agricultural purposes, while 3.25 km^{2} (1.25 mi^{2}) or 23.0% is forested. Of rest of the municipality 0.79 km^{2} (0.31 mi^{2}) or 5.6% is settled (buildings or roads), 0.04 km^{2} (9.9 acres) or 0.3% is either rivers or lakes.

From the same survey, housing and buildings made up 3.4% and transportation infrastructure made up 1.9%. A total of 20.8% of the total land area is heavily forested and 2.2% is covered with orchards or small clusters of trees. Of the agricultural land, 33.6% is used for growing crops and 34.9% is pasturage, while 2.1% is used for orchards or vine crops. All the water in the municipality is flowing water.

The municipality is located on the Rothbach stream and includes the village of Dürrenroth on the southern valley terrace. North of the Rothbach are the hamlets of Hubberg, Hubbergschachen and Gassen. South of the Rothbach is the hamlet of Waltrigen and scattered individual farm houses.

On 31 December 2009 Amtsbezirk Trachselwald, the municipality's former district, was dissolved. On the following day, 1 January 2010, it joined the newly created Verwaltungskreis Emmental.

== Coat of arms ==
The blazon of the municipal coat of arms is Argent a Bend wavy Gules and in chief sinister a Mullet and a Mount of 3 Coupeaux of the same.

== Demographics ==
Dürrenroth has a population (as of December 2020) of 1,052. As of 2012, 2.1% of the population are resident foreign nationals. Between the last 2 years (2010-2012) the population changed at a rate of -0.5%. Migration accounted for 0.1%, while births and deaths accounted for -0.8%.

Most of the population (as of 2000) speaks German (1,028 or 99.6%) as their first language, French is the second most common (3 or 0.3%).

As of 2013, the population was 48.6% male and 51.4% female. The population was made up of 503 Swiss men (47.2% of the population) and 15 (1.4%) non-Swiss men. There were 538 Swiss women (50.5%) and 10 (0.9%) non-Swiss women. Of the population in the municipality, 466 or about 45.2% were born in Dürrenroth and lived there in 2000. There were 419 or 40.6% who were born in the same canton, while 102 or 9.9% were born somewhere else in Switzerland, and 13 or 1.3% were born outside of Switzerland.

As of 2012, children and teenagers (0–19 years old) make up 24.2% of the population, while adults (20–64 years old) make up 57.0% and seniors (over 64 years old) make up 18.8%.

As of 2000, there were 423 people who were single and never married in the municipality. There were 517 married individuals, 73 widows or widowers and 19 individuals who are divorced.

As of 2010, there were 139 households that consist of only one person and 50 households with five or more people. In 2000, a total of 380 apartments (84.1% of the total) were permanently occupied, while 44 apartments (9.7%) were seasonally occupied and 28 apartments (6.2%) were empty. As of 2012, the construction rate of new housing units was 2.8 new units per 1000 residents. The vacancy rate for the municipality, in 2013, was 1.6%. In 2012, single family homes made up 36.2% of the total housing in the municipality.

The historical population is given in the following chart:

== Economy ==
As of 2011, Dürrenroth had an unemployment rate of 0.55%. As of 2011, there were a total of 408 people employed in the municipality. Of these, there were 202 people employed in the primary economic sector and about 66 businesses involved in this sector. The secondary sector employs 72 people and there were 18 businesses in this sector. The tertiary sector employs 133 people, with 38 businesses in this sector. There were 561 residents of the municipality who were employed in some capacity, of which females made up 44.2% of the workforce.

In 2008 there were a total of 289 full-time equivalent jobs. The number of jobs in the primary sector was 140, all of which were in agriculture. The number of jobs in the secondary sector was 65 of which 52 or (80.0%) were in manufacturing and 10 (15.4%) were in construction. The number of jobs in the tertiary sector was 84. In the tertiary sector; 23 or 27.4% were in wholesale or retail sales or the repair of motor vehicles, 3 or 3.6% were in the movement and storage of goods, 32 or 38.1% were in a hotel or restaurant, 4 or 4.8% were the insurance or financial industry, 5 or 6.0% were in education and 2 or 2.4% were in health care.

In 2000, there were 87 workers who commuted into the municipality and 291 workers who commuted away. The municipality is a net exporter of workers, with about 3.3 workers leaving the municipality for every one entering. A total of 270 workers (75.6% of the 357 total workers in the municipality) both lived and worked in Dürrenroth. Of the working population, 6.8% used public transportation to get to work, and 46.3% used a private car.

In 2013 the average church, local and cantonal tax rate on a married resident, with two children, of Dürrenroth making 150,000 CHF was 12.1%, while an unmarried resident's rate was 18.6%. For comparison, the median rate for all municipalities in the entire canton was 11.7% and 18.1%, while the nationwide median was 10.6% and 17.4% respectively.

In 2011 there were a total of 362 tax payers in the municipality. Of that total, 70 made over 75,000 CHF per year. There were 2 people who made between 15,000 and 20,000 per year. The greatest number of workers, 100, made between 50,000 and 75,000 CHF per year. The average income of the over 75,000 CHF group in Dürrenroth was 107,541 CHF, while the average across all of Switzerland was 136,785 CHF.

In 2011 a total of 2.3% of the population received direct financial assistance from the government.

== Heritage sites of national significance ==
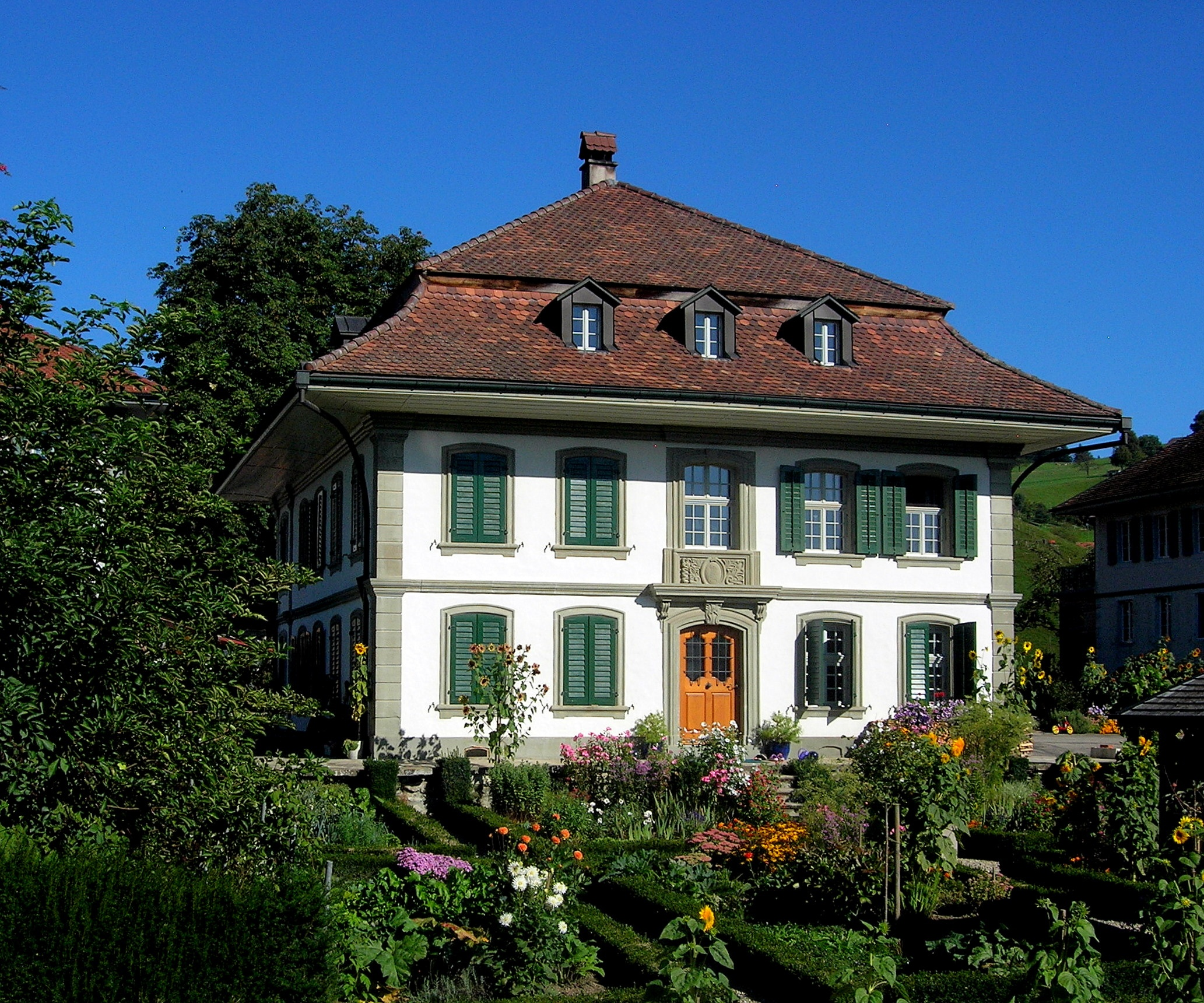
Gärbihof

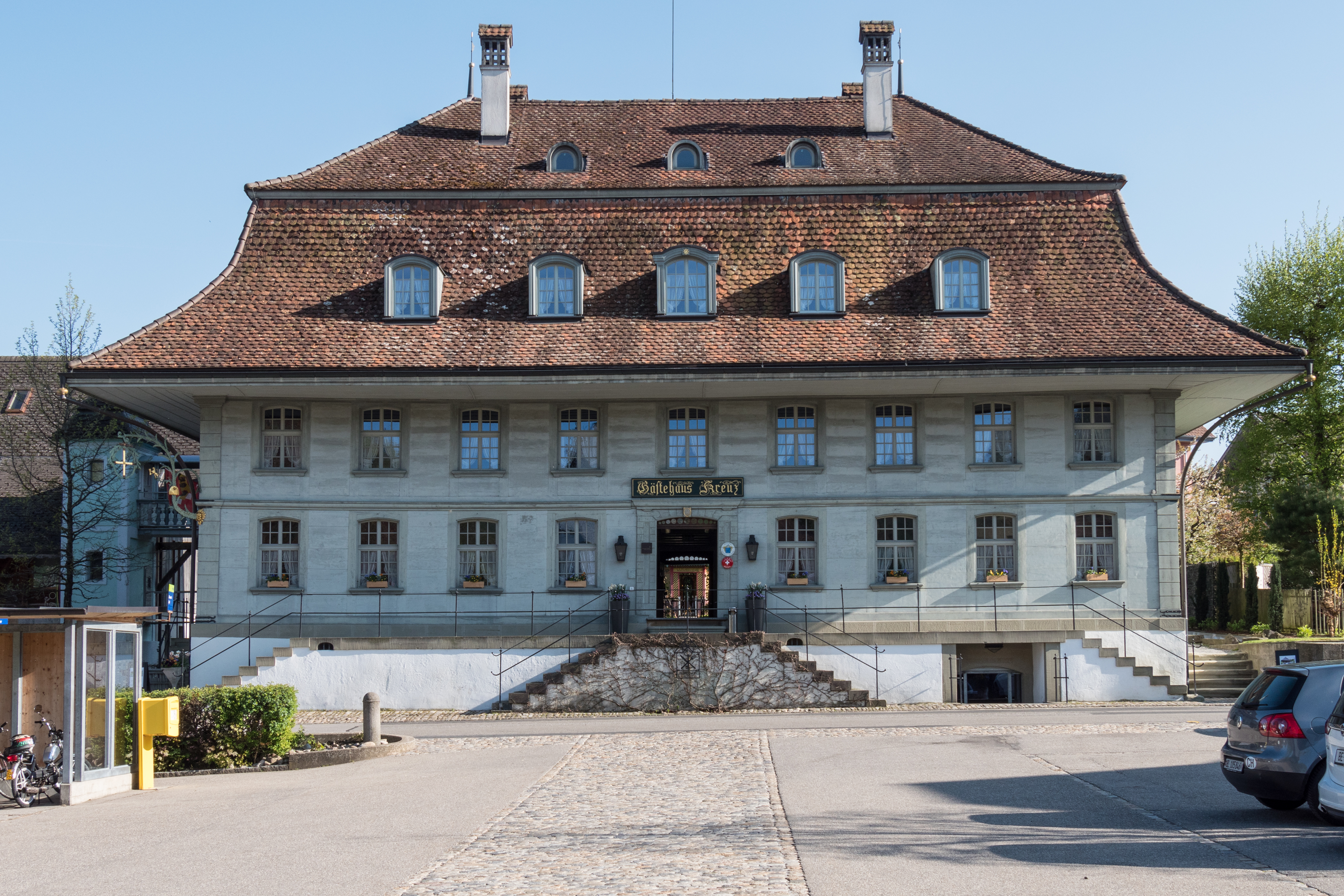
Gasthaus Kreuz in Dürrenroth

The farmhouse im Feld at Feld 93, the Gärbihof, the Gasthof Bären and the Gasthof Kreuz are listed as Swiss heritage site of national significance. The entire village of Dürrenroth is part of the Inventory of Swiss Heritage Sites.

== Politics ==
In the 2011 federal election the most popular party was the Swiss People's Party (SVP) which received 53.0% of the vote. The next three most popular parties were the Conservative Democratic Party (BDP) (17.7%), the Federal Democratic Union of Switzerland (EDU) (7.1%) and the Social Democratic Party (SP) (6.2%). In the federal election, a total of 426 votes were cast, and the voter turnout was 50.5%.

== Religion ==
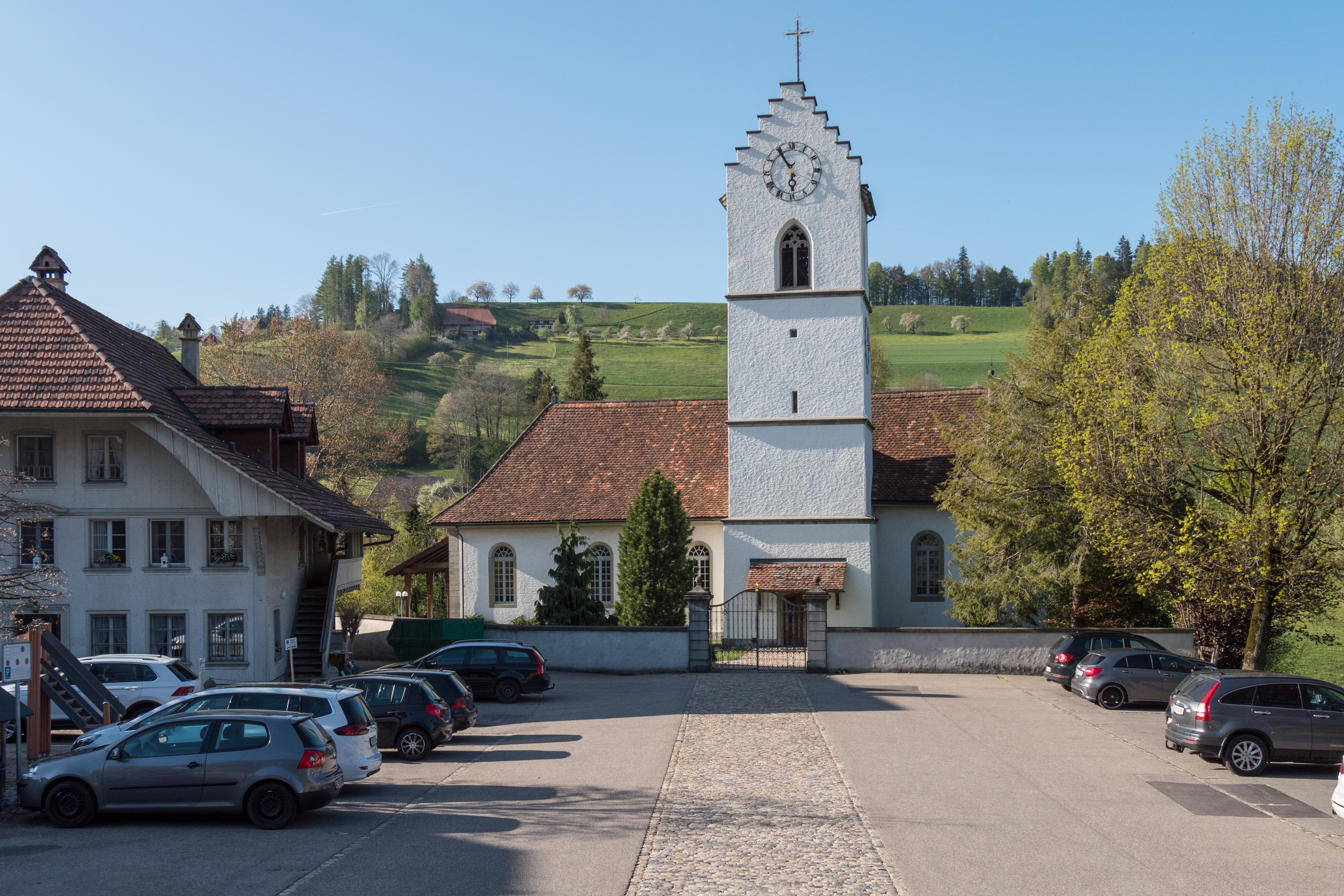
Reformed Church

From the 2000 census, 896 or 86.8% belonged to the Swiss Reformed Church, while 29 or 2.8% were Roman Catholic. Of the rest of the population, there were 4 members of an Orthodox church (or about 0.39% of the population), and there were 38 individuals (or about 3.68% of the population) who belonged to another Christian church. There were 4 individuals who belonged to another church. 29 (or about 2.81% of the population) belonged to no church, are agnostic or atheist, and 32 individuals (or about 3.10% of the population) did not answer the question.

== Education ==
In Dürrenroth about 63.1% of the population have completed non-mandatory upper secondary education, and 13.8% have completed additional higher education (either university or a Fachhochschule). Of the 85 who had completed some form of tertiary schooling listed in the census, 70.6% were Swiss men, 29.4% were Swiss women.

The Canton of Bern school system provides one year of non-obligatory Kindergarten, followed by six years of Primary school. This is followed by three years of obligatory lower Secondary school where the students are separated according to ability and aptitude. Following the lower Secondary students may attend additional schooling or they may enter an apprenticeship.

During the 2012-13 school year, there were a total of 122 students attending classes in Dürrenroth. There were a total of 19 students in the German language kindergarten classes in the municipality. The municipality's primary school had 103 students in German language classes. Of the primary students, 1.0% were permanent or temporary residents of Switzerland (not citizens).

As of 2000, there were a total of 100 students attending any school in the municipality. Of those, 95 both lived and attended school in the municipality, while 5 students came from another municipality. During the same year, 53 residents attended schools outside the municipality.
