= Affoltern im Emmental =

Swiss municipality in the canton of Bern

- Municipality
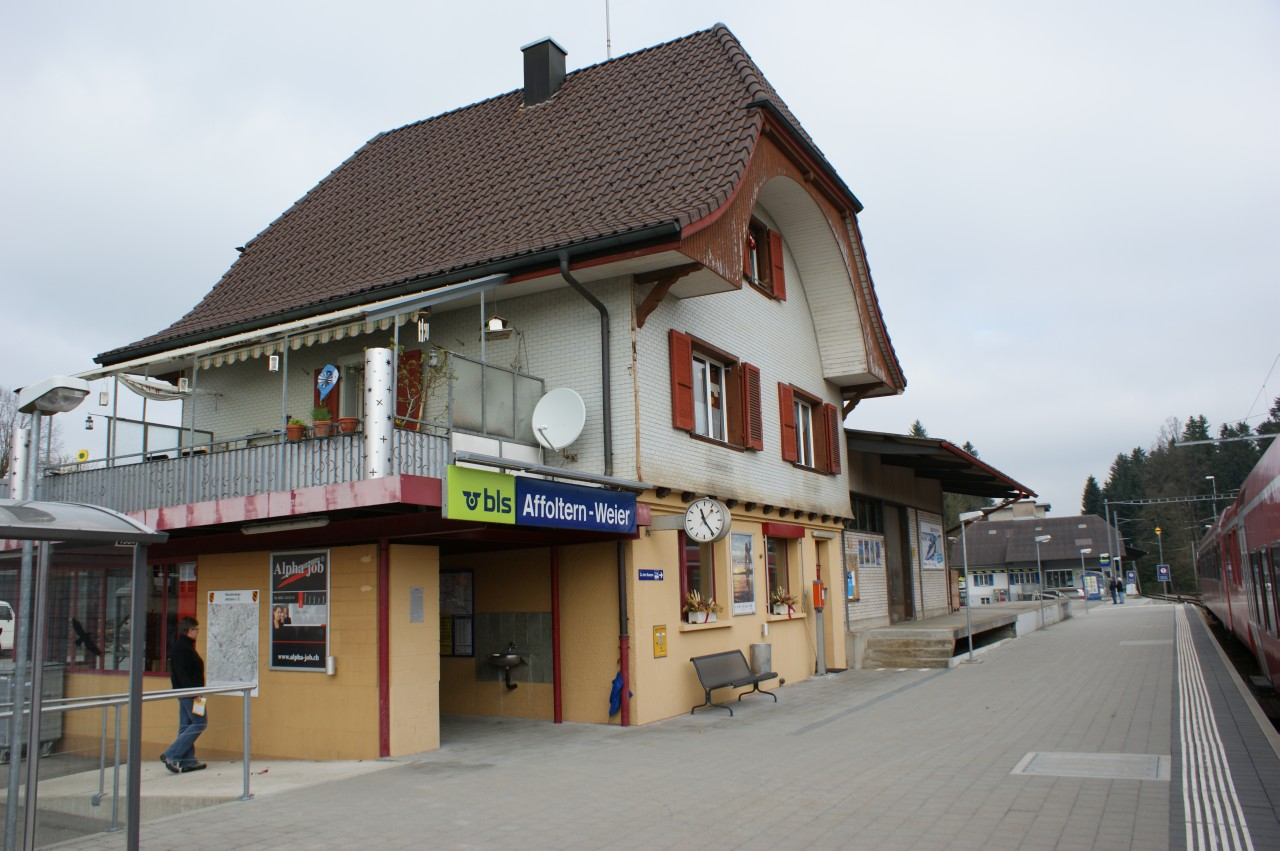
- Affoltern-Weier rail station

- Flag Coat of arms
- Location of Affoltern im Emmental
- Location within Switzerland Location within Canton of Bern
- Coordinates: 47°3′N 7°43′E
- Country: Switzerland
- Canton: Bern
- District: Emmental

Government
  - Executive: Gemeinderat with 5 members
  - Mayor: Gemeindepräsident(in); Jakob Aebi (as of 2026)

Area
  - Total: 11.5 km^{2} (4.4 sq mi)
- Elevation: 801 m (2,628 ft)

Population (December 2020)
  - Total: 1,125
  - Density: 97.8/km^{2} (253/sq mi)
- Time zone: UTC+01:00 (CET)
  - Summer (DST): UTC+02:00 (CEST)
- Postal code: 3416
- SFOS number: 951
- ISO 3166 code: CH-BE
- Localities: Weier, Rinderbach, Eggerdingen, Heiligenland, Hirsegg
- Surrounded by: Walterswil, Dürrenroth, Sumiswald, Rüegsau, Heimiswil, Wynigen
- Website: www.affolternimemmental.ch

Affoltern im Emmental (High Alemannic: Affoutere) is a municipality in the district of Trachselwald in the canton of Bern in Switzerland.

== History ==
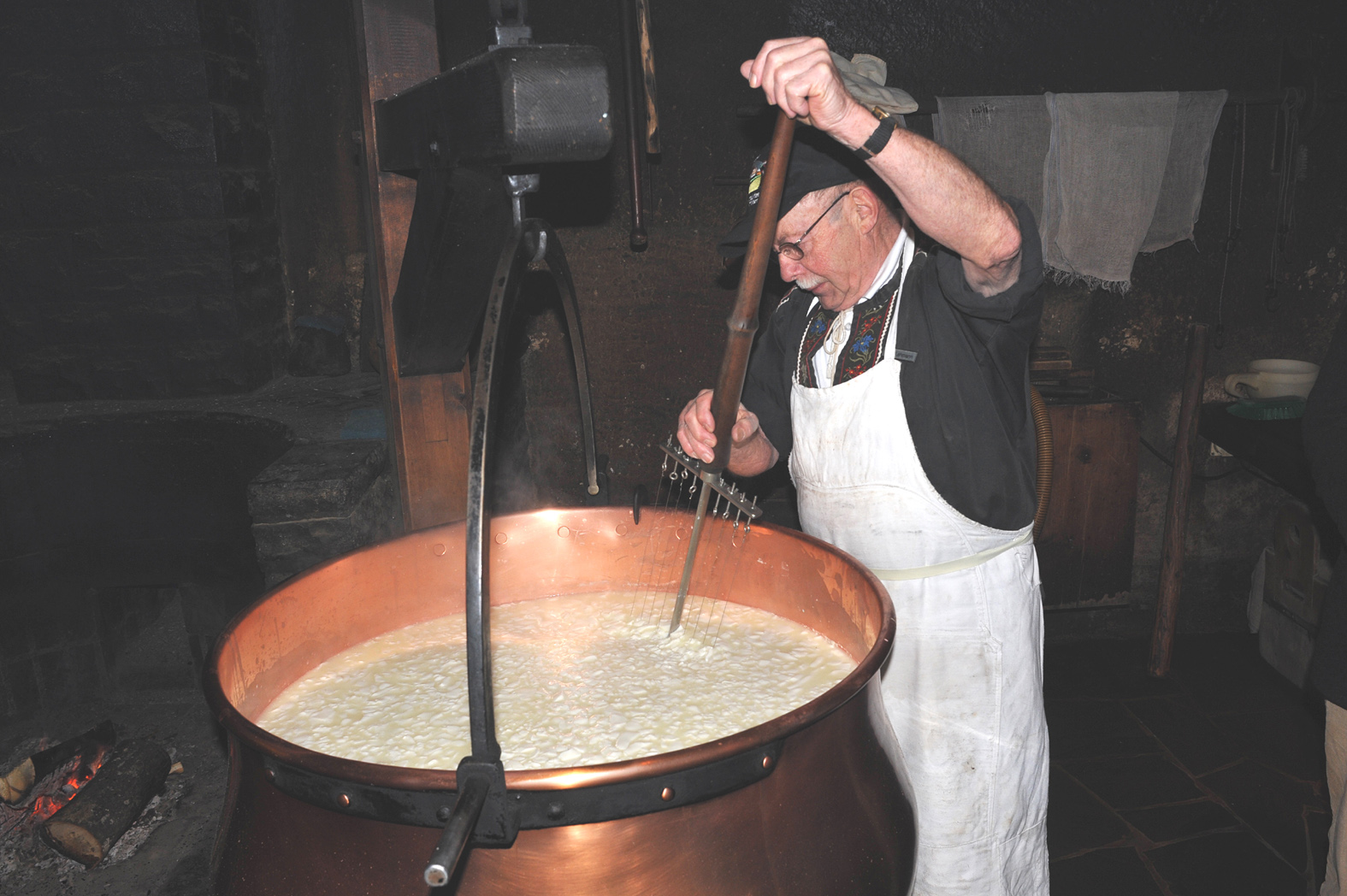
Cheesemaking at the Affoltern dairy

Affoltern is first mentioned in 1261/63 as Affolterra.

The oldest trace of a settlement in the area comes from the Middle Ages. The village church of St. Michael was first mentioned in 1275. It remained a local chapel until 1484 when the Teutonic Knights Commandry of Sumiswald provided funding for a permanent parish priest. In 1528, Bern adopted the new faith of the Protestant Reformation and Affoltern converted. However, the Commandry retained patronage rights over the church until 1698.

By the 18th century, many local farmers were raising cattle for meat and milk in the rolling Emmental hills. In 1764, the cheese exporting company Pionierbauern Sommer was founded in the municipality. It remained in business for over a century before closing in 1869. A cheese co-op opened in 1844 to support the local dairy farmers. In the early 20th century, the municipality remained fairly isolated and cheese producers and exporters began to leave for other communities. Today, about one-third of the jobs in Affoltern are in agriculture, with the rest being in small manufacturers and service companies. In 1990, a dairy center with cheesemaking demonstrations opened.

== Geography ==
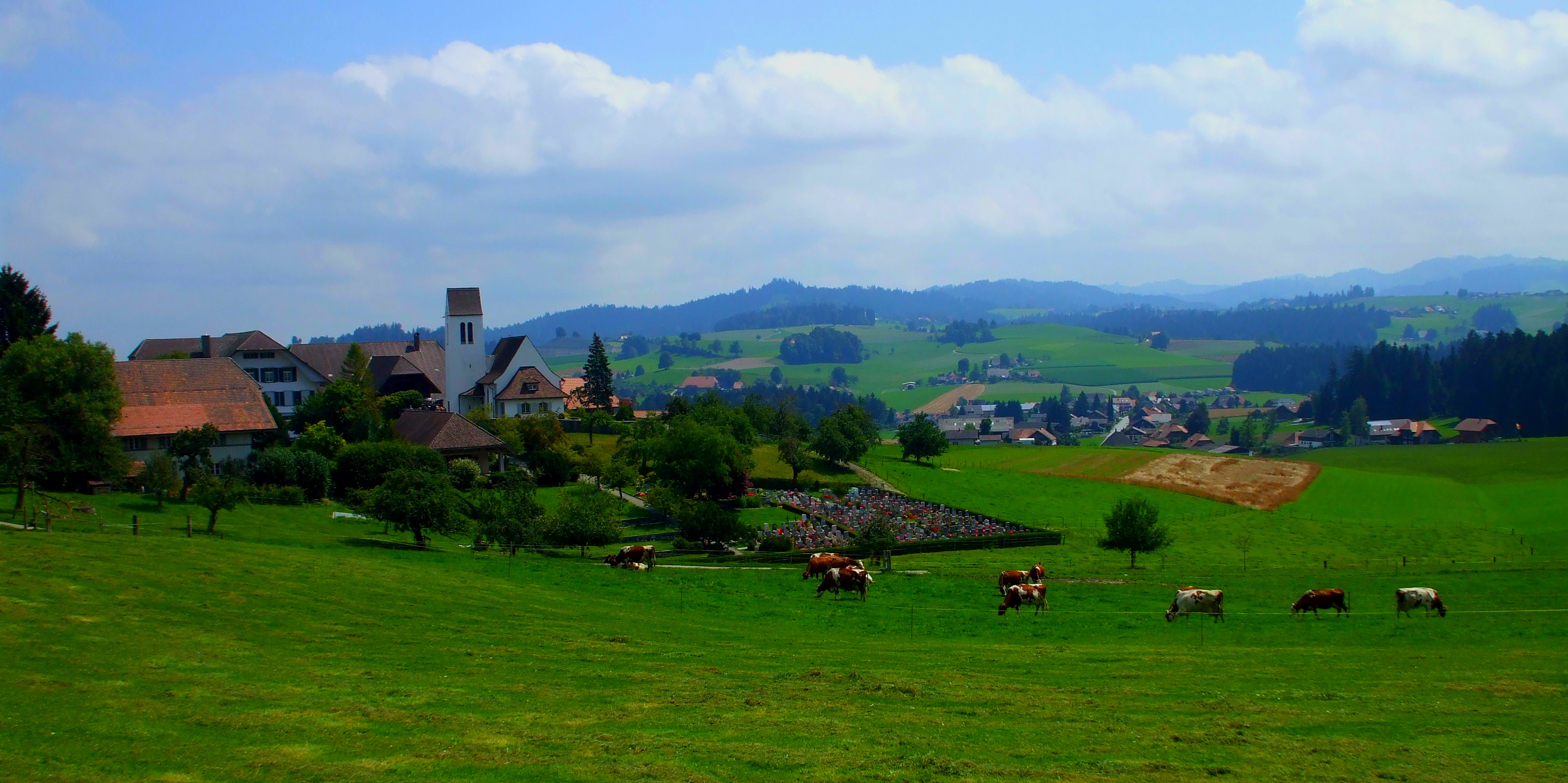
Countryside near Affoltern

Aerial view by Walter Mittelholzer (1923)

Affoltern im Emmental has an area of 11.51 km^{2} (4.44 sq mi). As of the 2005/06 survey, a total of 8.32 km^{2} (3.21 mi^{2}) or 72.3% is used for agricultural purposes, while 2.27 km^{2} (0.88 mi^{2}) or 19.7% is forested. Of the rest of the municipality, 0.87 km^{2} (0.34 mi^{2}) or 7.6% is settled (buildings or roads) and 0.01 km^{2} (2.5 acres) or 0.1% is unproductive land.

From the same survey, housing and buildings made up 4.3%, and transportation infrastructure made up 2.4%. All of the forested land area is covered with heavy forests. Of the agricultural land, 42.2% is used for growing crops and 28.7% is pasturage, while 1.4% is used for orchards or vine crops.

As indicated by the name, Affoltern i.E. is situated in the Emmental. It is bordered by Walterswil, Dürrenroth, Sumiswald, Rüegsau, Heimiswil and Wynigen. The well-known mountain Lueg is located in Affoltern. The hamlets of Weier, Rinderbach, Eggerdingen, Heiligenland, and Hirsegg belong to Affoltern im Emmental.

On 31 December 2009, Amtsbezirk Trachselwald, the municipality's former district, was dissolved. On the following day, 1 January 2010, it joined the newly created Verwaltungskreis Emmental.

=== Etymology ===
The name, Affoltern, is a derivation of the old German for apple-tree, "Affal Tra". The apple-tree features prominently in Affoltern's coat of arms, making it an example of canting arms.

The blazon of the municipal coat of arms is Argent an Apple Tree eradicated Vert fructed Gules.

== Demographics ==
Affoltern im Emmental has a population (as of December 2020) of 1,125. As of 2012, 3.5% of the population are resident foreign nationals. Between the last two years (2010-2012) the population changed at a rate of -0.1%. Migration accounted for -1.4%, while births and deaths accounted for 0.8%.

Most of the population (as of 2000) speaks German (1,189 or 98.1%) as their first language, Serbo-Croatian is the second most common (8 or 0.7%) and French is the third (4 or 0.3%). There is 1 person who speaks Italian.

As of 2013, the population was 50.0% male and 50.0% female. The population was made up of 558 Swiss men (48.4% of the population) and 19 (1.6%) non-Swiss men. There were 557 Swiss women (48.3%) and 19 (1.6%) non-Swiss women. Of the population in the municipality, 479 or about 39.5% were born in Affoltern im Emmental and lived there in 2000. There were 526 or 43.4% who were born in the same canton, while 105 or 8.7% were born somewhere else in Switzerland, and 45 or 3.7% were born outside of Switzerland.

As of 2012, children and teenagers (0–19 years old) make up 20.1% of the population, while adults (20–64 years old) make up 59.3% and seniors (over 64 years old) make up 20.6%.

As of 2000, there were 526 people who were single and never married in the municipality. There were 577 married individuals, 72 widows or widowers and 37 individuals who are divorced.

As of 2010, there were 150 households that consist of only one person and 44 households with five or more people. In 2000, a total of 443 apartments (84.9% of the total) were permanently occupied, while 50 apartments (9.6%) were seasonally occupied and 29 apartments (5.6%) were empty. As of 2012, the construction rate of new housing units was 2.6 new units per 1000 residents. The vacancy rate for the municipality, in 2013, was 2.0%. In 2012, single family homes made up 40.2% of the total housing in the municipality.

The historical population is given in the following chart:

== Economy ==
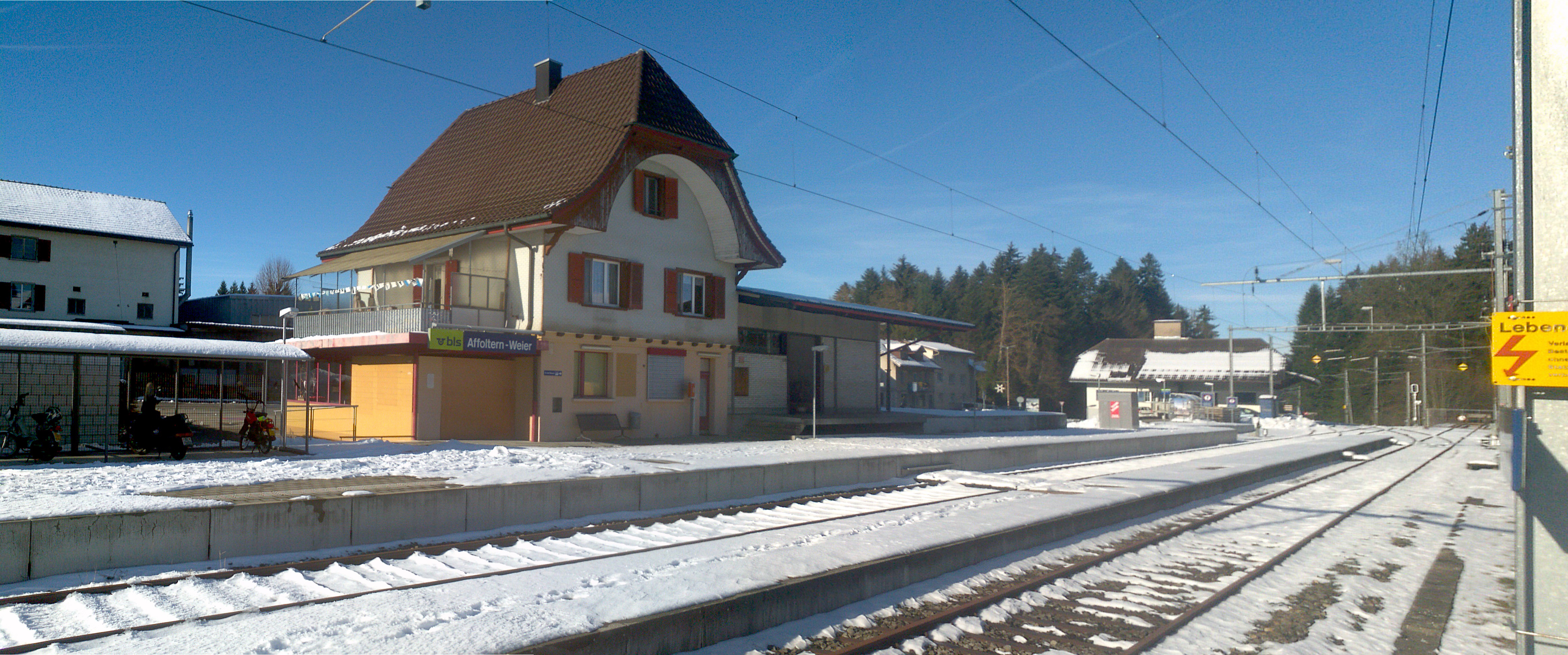
Affoltern railway station. Many residents commute to jobs in other communities.

As of 2011, Affoltern im Emmental had an unemployment rate of 1.95%. As of 2011, there were a total of 572 people employed in the municipality. Of these, there were 178 people employed in the primary economic sector and about 63 businesses involved in this sector. The secondary sector employs 184 people and there were 33 businesses in this sector. The tertiary sector employs 211 people, with 53 businesses in this sector. There were 649 residents of the municipality who were employed in some capacity, of which females made up 40.2% of the workforce.

In 2008, there were a total of 394 full-time equivalent jobs. The number of jobs in the primary sector was 117, all of which were in agriculture. The number of jobs in the secondary sector was 145 of which 93 or (64.1%) were in manufacturing and 53 (36.6%) were in construction. The number of jobs in the tertiary sector was 132. In the tertiary sector; 37 or 28.0% were in wholesale or retail sales or the repair of motor vehicles, 17 or 12.9% were in the movement and storage of goods, 21 or 15.9% were in a hotel or restaurant, 9 or 6.8% were the insurance or financial industry, 9 or 6.8% were in education, and 22 or 16.7% were in health care.

In 2000, there were 212 workers who commuted into the municipality and 328 workers who commuted away. The municipality is a net exporter of workers, with about 1.5 workers leaving the municipality for every one entering. A total of 321 workers (60.2% of the 533 total workers in the municipality) both lived and worked in Affoltern im Emmental. Of the working population, 6.2% used public transportation to get to work, and 53% used a private car.

In 2013, the average church, local and cantonal tax rate on a married resident, with two children, of Affoltern im Emmental making 150,000 CHF was 11.9%, while an unmarried resident's rate was 18.3%. For comparison, the median rate for all municipalities in the entire canton was 11.7% and 18.1%, while the nationwide median was 10.6% and 17.4% respectively.

In 2011, there were a total of 437 tax payers in the municipality. Of that total, 81 made over 75,000 CHF per year. There were 8 people who made between 15,000 and 20,000 per year. The greatest number of workers, 116, made between 50,000 and 75,000 CHF per year. The average income of the over 75,000 CHF group in Affoltern im Emmental was 103,449 CHF, while the average across all of Switzerland was 136,785 CHF.

In 2011, a total of 0.7% of the population received direct financial assistance from the government.

== Politics ==
In the 2011 federal election, the most popular party was the Swiss People's Party (SVP), which received 49.7% of the vote. The next three most popular parties were the Conservative Democratic Party (BDP) (12.8%), the Social Democratic Party (SP) (9.8%) and the Evangelical People's Party (EVP) (9.1%). In the federal election, a total of 500 votes were cast, and the voter turnout was 54.1%.

== Religion ==
From the 2000 census, 1,001 or 82.6% belonged to the Swiss Reformed Church, while 66 or 5.4% were Roman Catholic. Of the rest of the population, there were 61 individuals (or about 5.03% of the population) who belonged to another Christian church. There were 9 (or about 0.74% of the population) who were Muslim. There were 2 individuals who were Hindu. 38 (or about 3.14% of the population) belonged to no church, are agnostic or atheist, and 35 individuals (or about 2.89% of the population) did not answer the question.

== Climate ==
Between 1981 and 2010, Affoltern im Emmental had an average of 138.3 days of rain or snow per year and on average received 1,222 mm (48.1 in) of precipitation. The wettest month was May during which time Affoltern im Emmental received an average of 138 mm (5.4 in) of rain or snow. During this month, there was precipitation for an average of 13.6 days. The driest month of the year was February with an average of 67 mm (2.6 in) of precipitation over 10.5 days.

== Education ==
In Affoltern im Emmental about 58.6% of the population have completed non-mandatory upper secondary education, and 17.6% have completed additional higher education (either university or a Fachhochschule). Of the 126 who had completed some form of tertiary schooling listed in the census, 68.3% were Swiss men, 24.6% were Swiss women, 4.8% were non-Swiss men.

The Canton of Bern school system provides one year of non-obligatory Kindergarten, followed by six years of Primary school. This is followed by three years of obligatory lower Secondary school where the students are separated according to ability and aptitude. Following the lower Secondary students may attend additional schooling or they may enter an apprenticeship.

During the 2012–13 school year, there were a total of 92 students attending classes in Affoltern im Emmental. There were a total of 20 students in the German language kindergarten classes in the municipality. Of the kindergarten students, 5.0% were permanent or temporary residents of Switzerland (not citizens) and 5.0% have a different mother language than the classroom language. The municipality's primary school had 59 students in German language classes. Of the primary students, 6.8% were permanent or temporary residents of Switzerland (not citizens) and 5.1% have a different mother language from the classroom language. During the same year, the lower secondary schools in neighboring municipalities had a total of 13 students from Affoltern im Emmental.

As of 2000, there were a total of 174 students attending any school in the municipality. Of those, 132 both lived and attended school in the municipality, while 42 students came from another municipality. During the same year, 60 residents attended schools outside the municipality.

== Transportation ==
A train station is located in Weier, which connects it to Huttwil in the one direction and Lützelflüh in the other.

== Famous people ==
- Bruno Leibundgut - astronomer and former Science Director of the ESO who co-invented the Very Large Telescope was born in Affoltern.
