= Fritz Gerber =

Swiss business executive (1929–2020)

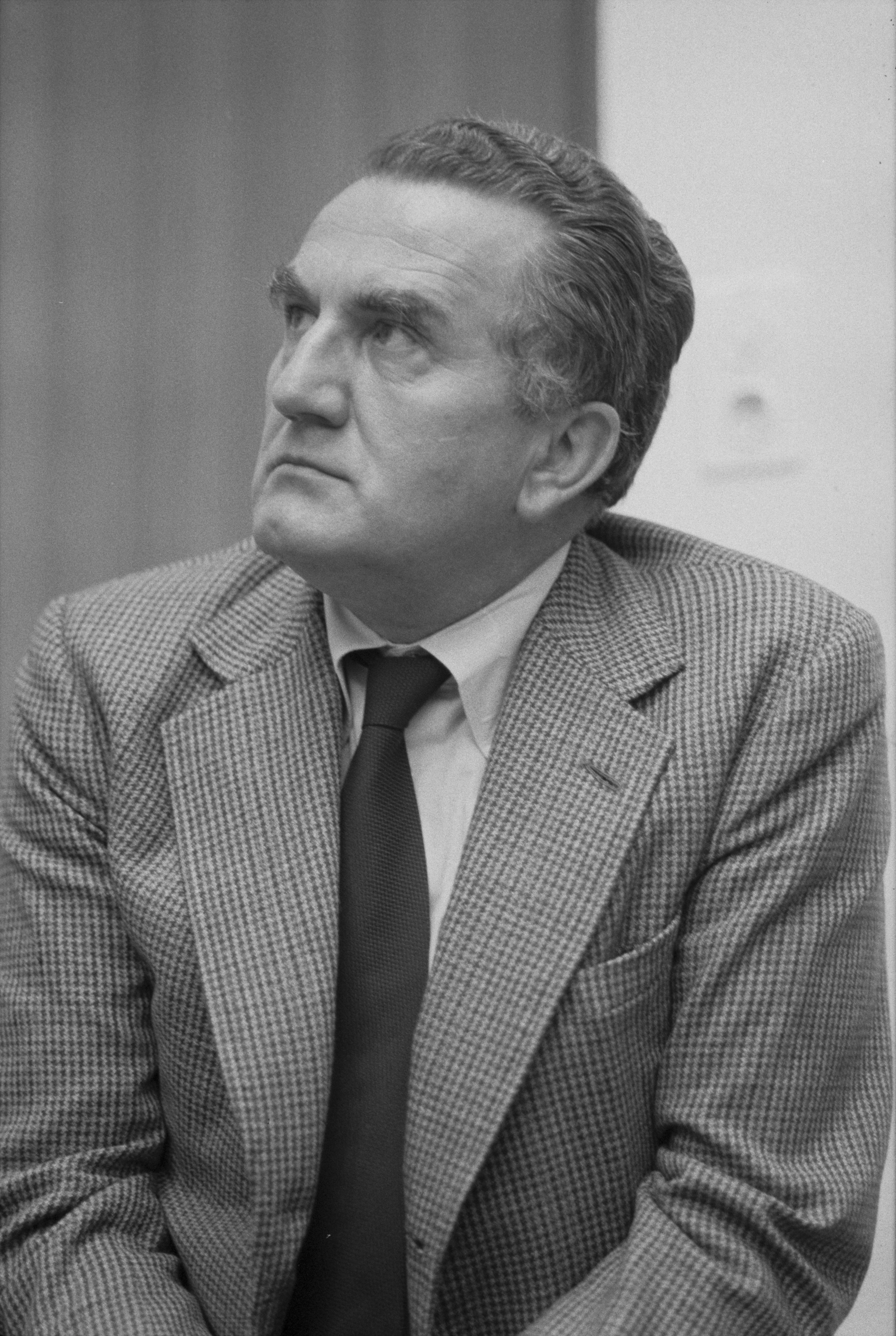
- Gerber in 1983
- Born: 22 March 1929; Huttwil, Switzerland
- Died: 11 May 2020 (aged 91)
- Education: University of Bern
- Title: CEO, Hoffmann-La Roche
- Spouse: Renate
- Children: 5

Fritz Gerber (22 March 1929 – 10 May 2020) was a Swiss business executive. He was the Chief Executive Officer of Hoffmann-La Roche from 1978 to 1998. From 1977 to 1991, he was also the CEO of Zurich Insurance Group. Under his management, Roche expanded to become a significant player in biotechnology and diagnostics.

== Biography ==
Fritz Gerber was born on 22 March 1929 in Huttwil, a municipality in the Canton of Bern. After completing his law degree at the University of Bern, he found work as a trade negotiator for the Swiss government. In 1958, he started his career at Zurich Insurance, performing legal work in a number of locations. He rose through the ranks quickly. In 1965, he became a director of the insurance company at the age of 36 and in 1974 was named as the president of the management board.

In 1977, he was appointed as CEO of Zurich Insurance. One year later, Hoffman-La Roche named him as its CEO, but retained his position at Zurich. From 1978 to 1991, he ran both companies. At the time of his appointment, Roche was struggling from reputational fallout after the 1976 Seveso disaster in which an explosion at a facility operated by a Roche subsidiary in Italy sickened people and livestock in the surrounding area.

In 1990, Gerber moved into the biotechnology field with the acquisition of a 60% stake in Genentech for $2.1 billion. With the acquisition, the company gained access to breakthrough cancer drugs such as Herceptin and Avastin. In 1991, Roche acquired the patent rights to polymerase chain reaction technology from Cetus Corporation. The acquisition of Boehringer Mannheim, now Roche Diagnostics, for $11 billion made Roche the largest diagnostic products company in the world and the sixth-largest pharmaceuticals firm in the world at the time.

Gerber stepped down as the CEO or Zurich Insurance in 1991, but remained as the chairman of the board of directors until 1995. In 1997, he stepped down as CEO of Roche and stayed on as chairman until 2001. In 2004, he surrendered his seat on the board and took an honorary title with Roche.

Gerber was active in charitable work. He was involved in efforts to establish the Museum Tinguely in Basel. He also had a personal charitable foundation for talented youths.

Fritz Gerber suffered a stroke on 9 May 2020 and died on 10 May 2020 at the age of 91.
