= Eriswil =

- Municipality
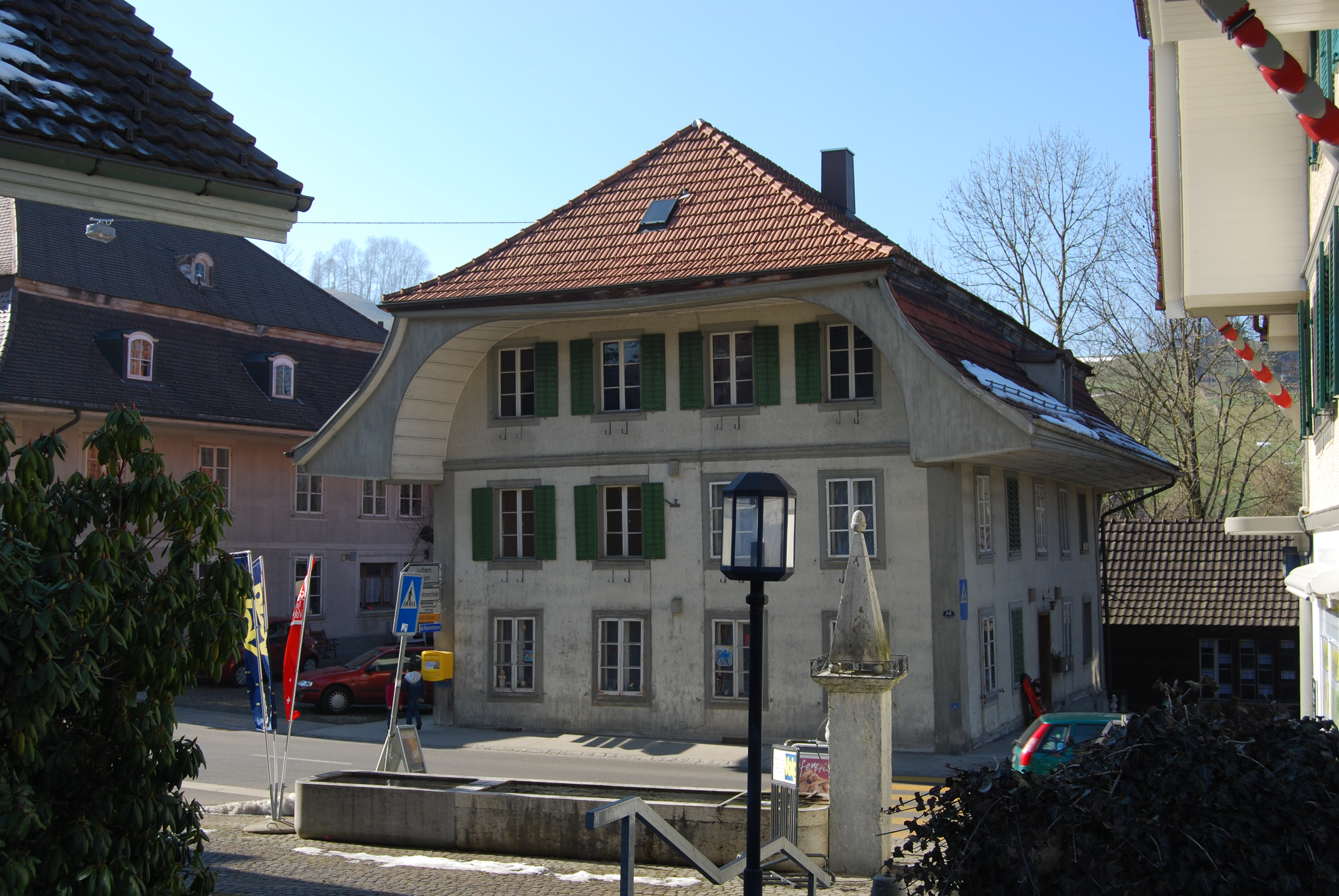

- Flag Coat of arms
- Location of Eriswil
- Location within Switzerland Location within Canton of Bern
- Coordinates: 47°5′N 7°51′E
- Country: Switzerland
- Canton: Bern
- District: Oberaargau

Government
  - Mayor: Heinz Ruch

Area
  - Total: 11.3 km^{2} (4.4 sq mi)
- Elevation: 740 m (2,430 ft)

Population (Dec 2012)
  - Total: 1,360
  - Density: 120/km^{2} (312/sq mi)
- Time zone: UTC+01:00 (CET)
  - Summer (DST): UTC+02:00 (CEST)
- Postal code: 4952
- SFOS number: 953
- ISO 3166 code: CH-BE
- Surrounded by: Huttwil, Luthern (LU), Sumiswald, Ufhusen (LU), Wyssachen
- Website: www.eriswil.ch

Eriswil is a municipality in the Oberaargau administrative district in the Swiss canton of Bern.

== History ==
Eriswil is first mentioned in 1256 as Erolzwile.

Very little is known about the early history of the village. By the High Middle Ages a local noble family, the von Eriswil family, were a Ministerialis (unfree knights in the service of a feudal overlord) family in service to the Counts of Kyburg. However, the family died out in the 14th century. In the last quarter of the 14th century the region was acquired by St. Gallen and incorporated into the Rohrbach district. Over the following century, Bernese expansion brought Rohrbach under Bern's control. In 1504 it bought the entire region and added Eriswil to the Trachselwald bailiwick in the Oberaargau District.

The village church was originally under the authority of the Abbey of Saint Gall. It appears that the oldest part of the church is the bell tower which dates from around the 14th century. The current choir was built in the 16th century, while the nave was built in 1905. In 1528 Bern adopted the new faith of the Protestant Reformation and Eriswil converted at that time, severing most ties with the Abbey. Until 1966 the local parish also included the nearby village of Wyssachen.

Traditionally the village economy relied on agriculture. By the 17th century village society had stratified into two major classes, well-off citizen farmers and a large number of poor Tauner who had limited rights and worked as sharecroppers. In 1622 the village closed itself to further Tauner immigration and prevented them from building houses on any of the common land. In the following century many of the local Tauner began producing canvas in small home factories. By 1750 there was a thriving canvas cottage industry in the village. Around 1860, the small scale weaving was replaced with large weaving factories. Despite economic depressions and wars, four of the local factories remained in operation until the 1970s to 1990s.

== Geography ==
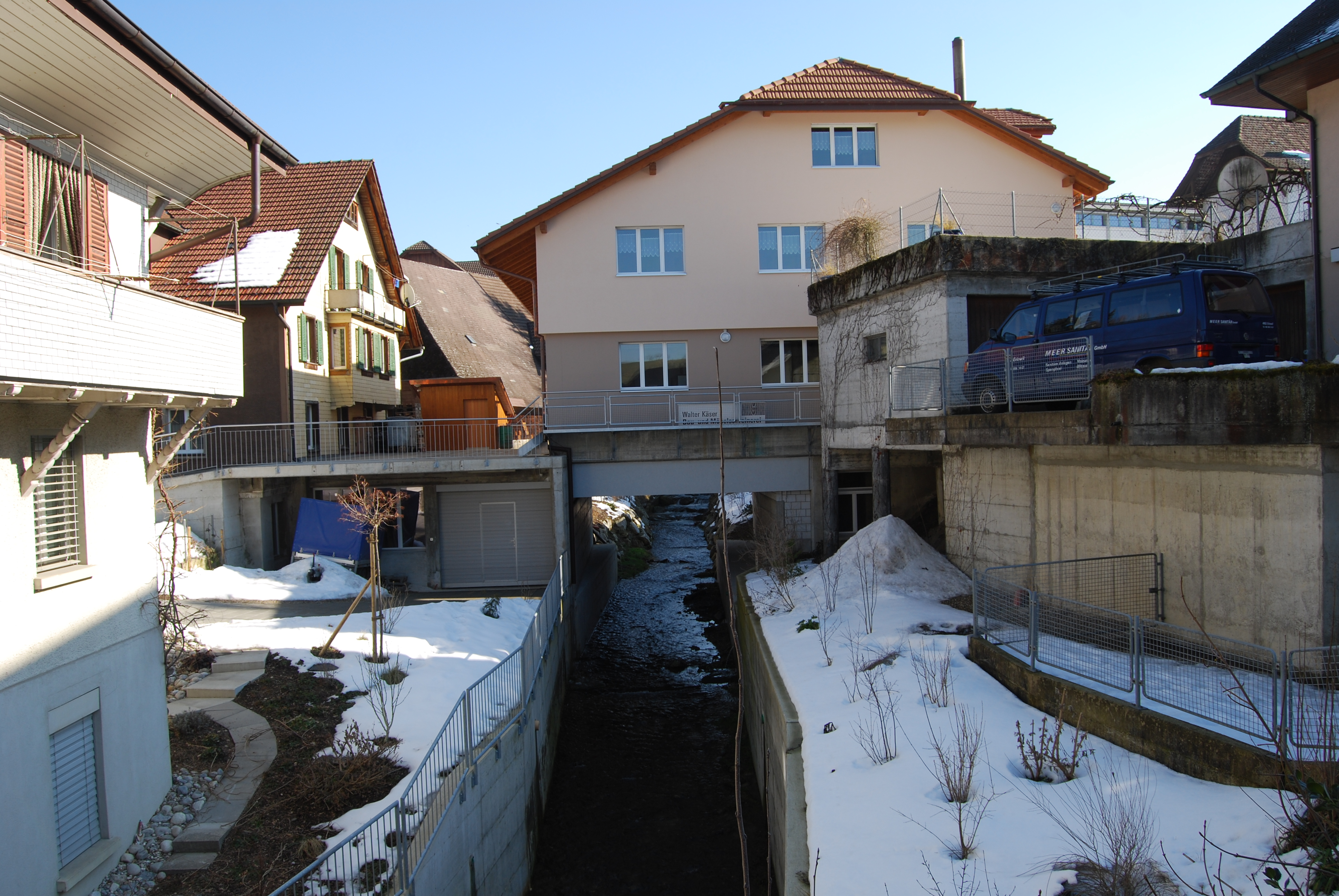
Langete river at Eriswil

Aerial view by Walter Mittelholzer (1923)

Eriswil has an area of 11.34 km^{2} (4.38 sq mi). As of the 2006 survey, a total of 7.61 km^{2} (2.94 mi^{2}) or 67.0% is used for agricultural purposes, while 2.97 km^{2} (1.15 mi^{2}) or 26.1% is forested. Of rest of the municipality 0.73 km^{2} (0.28 mi^{2}) or 6.4% is settled (buildings or roads), 0.01 km^{2} (2.5 acres) or 0.1% is either rivers or lakes and 0.01 km^{2} (2.5 acres) or 0.1% is unproductive land.

From the same survey, housing and buildings made up 3.8% and transportation infrastructure made up 2.0%. A total of 22.7% of the total land area is heavily forested and 3.4% is covered with orchards or small clusters of trees. Of the agricultural land, 17.0% is used for growing crops and 46.7% is pasturage, while 2.6% is used for orchards or vine crops. All the water in the municipality is flowing water.

The municipality is located in part of the Oberaargau. It includes the village of Eriswil, the Gütergemeinden Vorder- and Hinterdorf, and the hamlets of Neuligen and Schwendi. Schwendi joined the municipality in 1888-89 following a survey of the border with Wyssachen.

On 31 December 2009 Amtsbezirk Trachselwald, the municipality's former district, was dissolved. On the following day, 1 January 2010, it joined the newly created Verwaltungskreis Oberaargau.

== Coat of arms ==
The blazon of the municipal coat of arms is Gules a Mount of 6 Coupeaux Vert floatant.

== Demographics ==
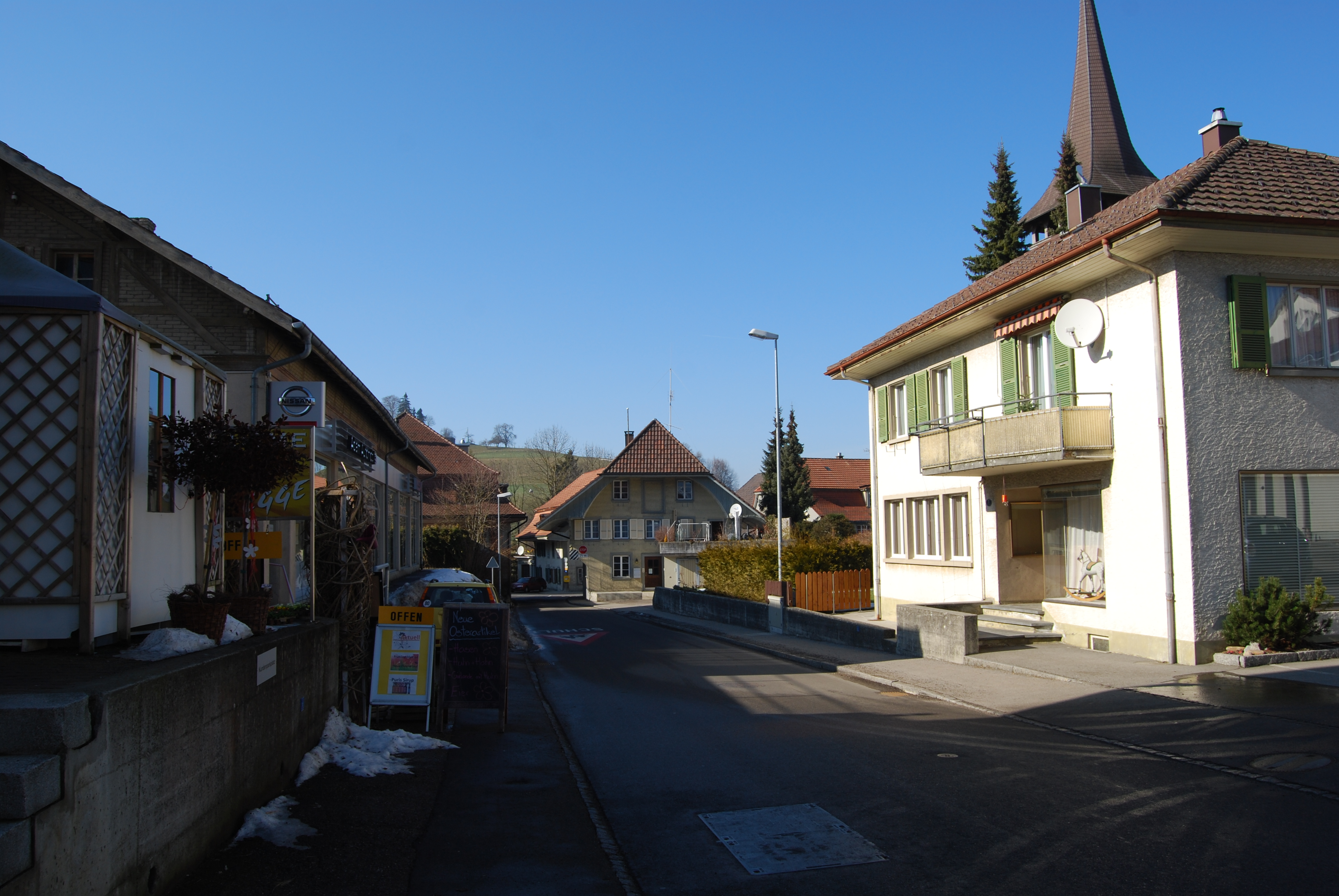
Eriswil village

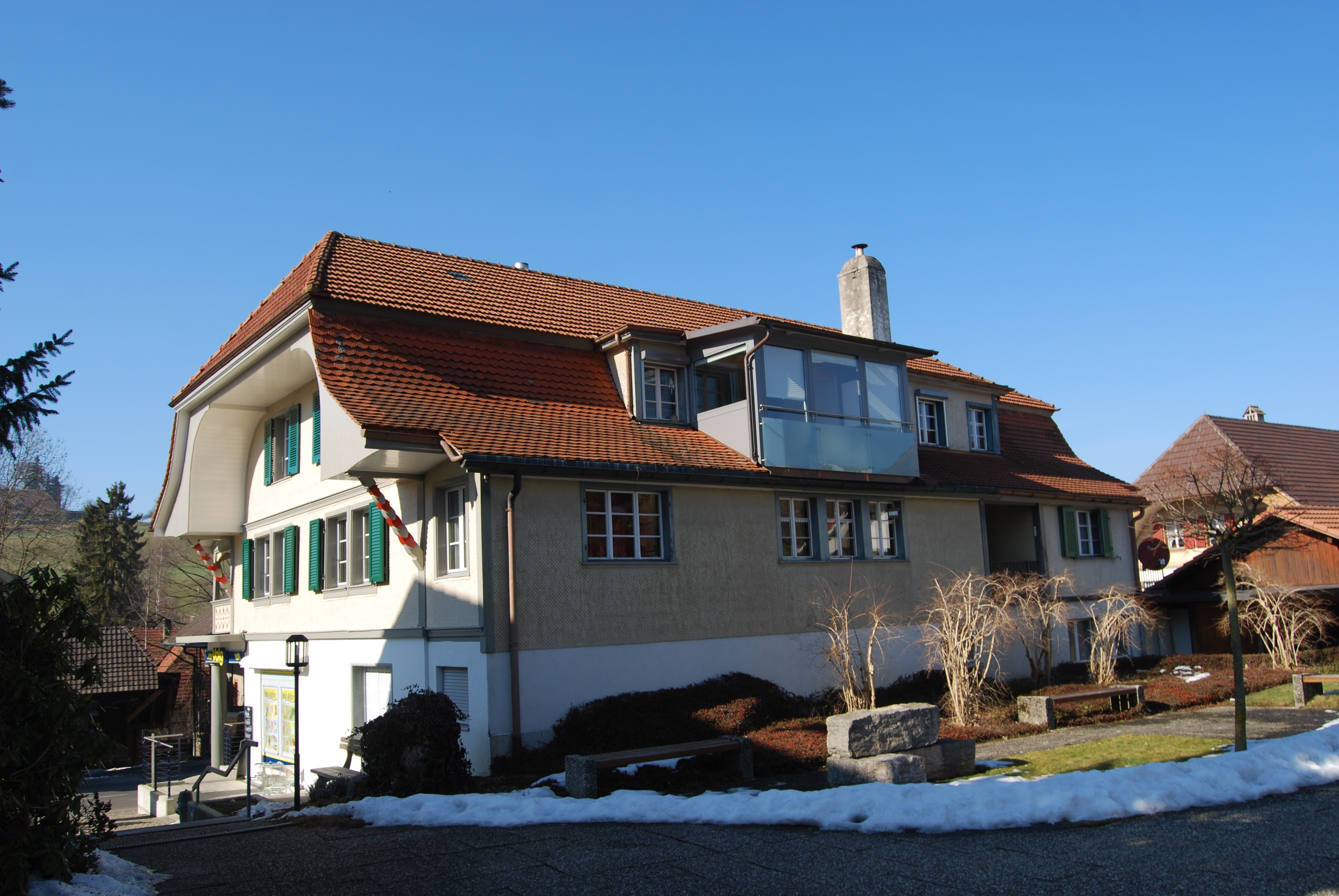
Houses in Eriswil

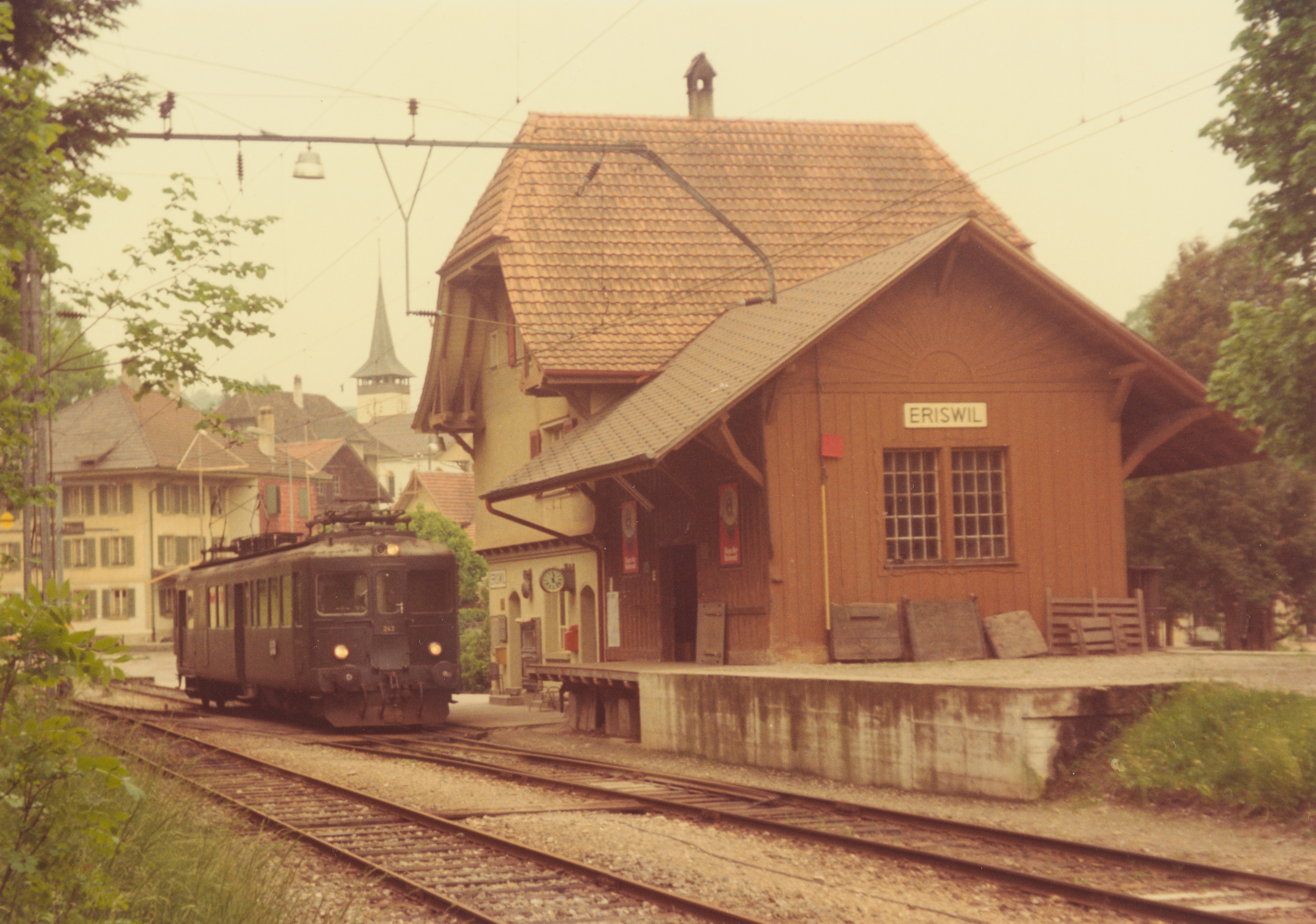
Former train station (c. 1986)

Eriswil has a population (as of December 2020) of 1,358. As of 2012, 3.6% of the population are resident foreign nationals. Between the last 2 years (2010-2012) the population changed at a rate of 0.3%. Migration accounted for 0.7%, while births and deaths accounted for 0.2%.

Most of the population (as of 2000) speaks German (1,403 or 97.5%) as their first language, Albanian is the second most common (11 or 0.8%) and French is the third (4 or 0.3%). There are 2 people who speak Italian and 1 person who speaks Romansh.

As of 2013, the population was 49.9% male and 50.1% female. The population was made up of 653 Swiss men (47.1% of the population) and 38 (2.7%) non-Swiss men. There were 668 Swiss women (48.2%) and 27 (1.9%) non-Swiss women. Of the population in the municipality, 714 or about 49.6% were born in Eriswil and lived there in 2000. There were 427 or 29.7% who were born in the same canton, while 176 or 12.2% were born somewhere else in Switzerland, and 73 or 5.1% were born outside of Switzerland.

As of 2012, children and teenagers (0–19 years old) make up 23.4% of the population, while adults (20–64 years old) make up 56.5% and seniors (over 64 years old) make up 20.1%.

As of 2000, there were 602 people who were single and never married in the municipality. There were 690 married individuals, 106 widows or widowers and 41 individuals who are divorced.

As of 2010, there were 169 households that consist of only one person and 53 households with five or more people. In 2000, a total of 517 apartments (85.5% of the total) were permanently occupied, while 45 apartments (7.4%) were seasonally occupied and 43 apartments (7.1%) were empty. As of 2012, the construction rate of new housing units was 0.7 new units per 1000 residents. The vacancy rate for the municipality, in 2013, was 1.0%. In 2012, single family homes made up 38.4% of the total housing in the municipality.

The historical population is given in the following chart:

== Economy ==
As of 2011, Eriswil had an unemployment rate of 0.83%. As of 2011, there were a total of 465 people employed in the municipality. Of these, there were 170 people employed in the primary economic sector and about 62 businesses involved in this sector. The secondary sector employs 110 people and there were 27 businesses in this sector. The tertiary sector employs 185 people, with 51 businesses in this sector. There were 749 residents of the municipality who were employed in some capacity, of which females made up 39.7% of the workforce.

In 2008 there were a total of 307 full-time equivalent jobs. The number of jobs in the primary sector was 115, all of which were in agriculture. The number of jobs in the secondary sector was 98 of which 78 or (79.6%) were in manufacturing and 20 (20.4%) were in construction. The number of jobs in the tertiary sector was 94. In the tertiary sector; 19 or 20.2% were in wholesale or retail sales or the repair of motor vehicles, 5 or 5.3% were in the movement and storage of goods, 5 or 5.3% were in a hotel or restaurant, 1 was the insurance or financial industry, 13 or 13.8% were in education and 27 or 28.7% were in health care.

In 2000, there were 74 workers who commuted into the municipality and 454 workers who commuted away. The municipality is a net exporter of workers, with about 6.1 workers leaving the municipality for every one entering. A total of 295 workers (79.9% of the 369 total workers in the municipality) both lived and worked in Eriswil. Of the working population, 8.1% used public transportation to get to work, and 55.5% used a private car.

In 2013 the average church, local and cantonal tax rate on a married resident, with two children, of Eriswil making 150,000 CHF was 11.8%, while an unmarried resident's rate was 18.1%. For comparison, the median rate for all municipalities in the entire canton was 11.7% and 18.1%, while the nationwide median was 10.6% and 17.4% respectively.

In 2011 there were a total of 473 tax payers in the municipality. Of that total, 82 made over 75,000 CHF per year. There were 6 people who made between 15,000 and 20,000 per year. The greatest number of workers, 117, made between 50,000 and 75,000 CHF per year. The average income of the over 75,000 CHF group in Eriswil was 106,312 CHF, while the average across all of Switzerland was 136,785 CHF.

In 2011 a total of 2.0% of the population received direct financial assistance from the government.

== Politics ==
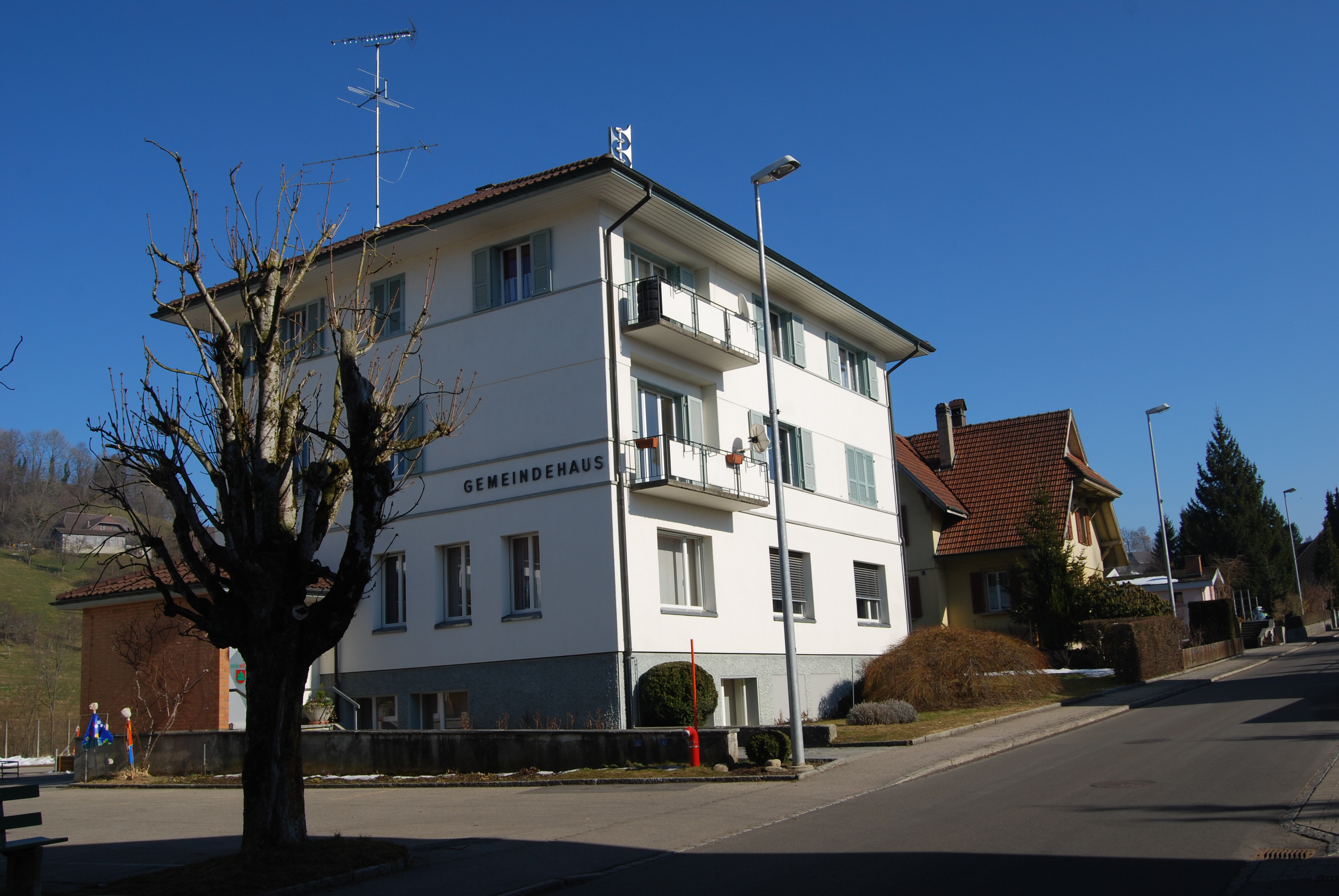
Municipal administration building of Eriswil

In the 2011 federal election the most popular party was the Swiss People's Party (SVP) which received 39.7% of the vote. The next three most popular parties were the Conservative Democratic Party (BDP) (16.0%), the Social Democratic Party (SP) (12.6%) and the Federal Democratic Union of Switzerland (EDU) (9.1%). In the federal election, a total of 519 votes were cast, and the voter turnout was 47.0%.

== Religion ==
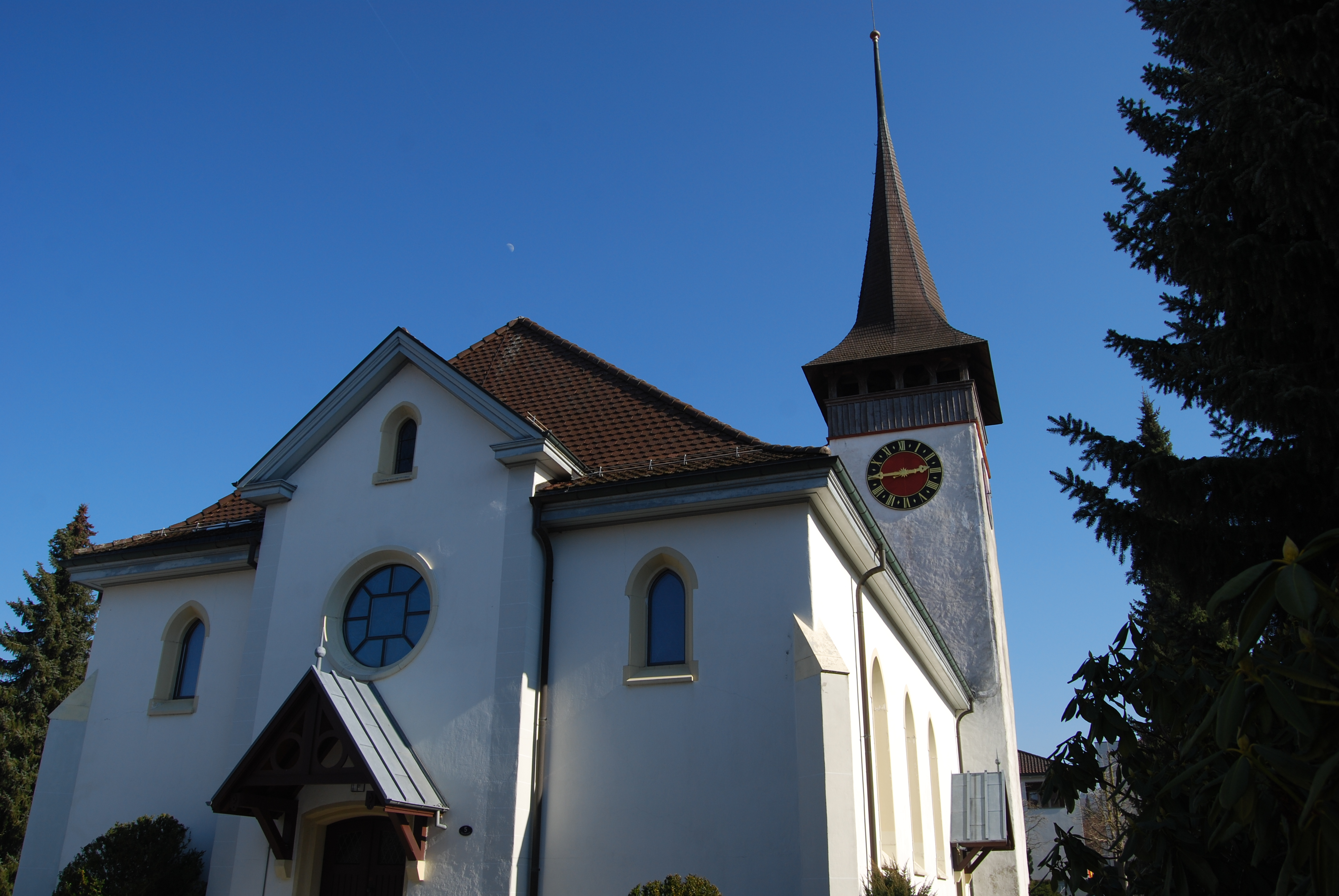
Swiss Reformed parish church in Eriswil

From the 2000 census, 1,110 or 77.1% belonged to the Swiss Reformed Church, while 106 or 7.4% were Roman Catholic. Of the rest of the population, there were 5 members of an Orthodox church (or about 0.35% of the population), there were 2 individuals (or about 0.14% of the population) who belonged to the Christian Catholic Church, and there were 81 individuals (or about 5.63% of the population) who belonged to another Christian church. There was 1 individual who was Jewish, and 17 (or about 1.18% of the population) who were Muslim. There were 22 individuals who were Hindu and 1 individual who belonged to another church. 55 (or about 3.82% of the population) belonged to no church, are agnostic or atheist, and 39 individuals (or about 2.71% of the population) did not answer the question.

== Climate ==
Between 1981 and 2010 Eriswil had an average of 142.2 days of rain or snow per year and on average received 1,282 mm (50.5 in) of precipitation. The wettest month was May during which time Eriswil received an average of 139 mm (5.5 in) of rain or snow. During this month there was precipitation for an average of 14.1 days. The driest month of the year was February with an average of 78 mm (3.1 in) of precipitation over 10.9 days.

== Education ==
In Eriswil about 55.8% of the population have completed non-mandatory upper secondary education, and 10.8% have completed additional higher education (either university or a Fachhochschule). Of the 91 who had completed some form of tertiary schooling listed in the census, 75.8% were Swiss men, 20.9% were Swiss women.

The Canton of Bern school system provides one year of non-obligatory Kindergarten, followed by six years of Primary school. This is followed by three years of obligatory lower Secondary school where the students are separated according to ability and aptitude. Following the lower Secondary students may attend additional schooling or they may enter an apprenticeship.

During the 2012-13 school year, there were a total of 147 students attending classes in Eriswil. There were a total of 18 students in the German language kindergarten classes in the municipality. Of the kindergarten students, 5.6% were permanent or temporary residents of Switzerland (not citizens) and 5.6% have a different mother language than the classroom language. The municipality's primary school had 103 students in German language classes. Of the primary students, 5.8% were permanent or temporary residents of Switzerland (not citizens) and 6.8% have a different mother language than the classroom language. During the same year, the lower secondary schools in neighboring municipalities had a total of 26 students from Eriswil. There were 7.7% who were permanent or temporary residents of Switzerland (not citizens) and have a different mother language than the classroom language.

As of 2000, there were a total of 147 students attending any school in the municipality. Of those, 115 both lived and attended school in the municipality, while 32 students came from another municipality. During the same year, 85 residents attended schools outside the municipality.
