= Anja Nyffeler =

Swiss synchronized swimmer

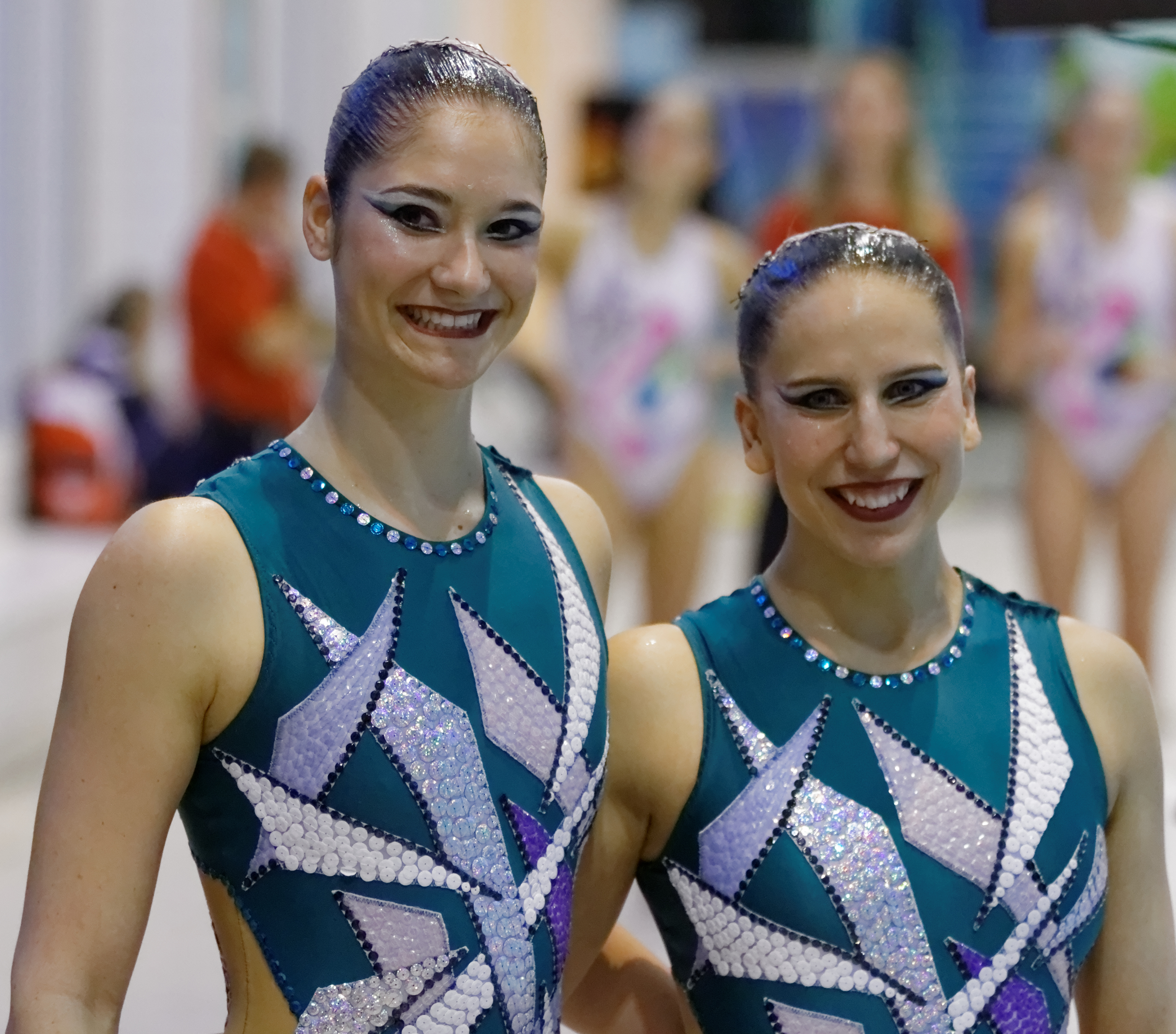
- Anja Nyffeler (left) and Pamela Fischer in March 2013

Personal information
- Nationality: Switzerland
- Born: 25 November 1992 (age 33) Huttwil, Switzerland
- Height: 172 cm (5 ft 8 in)
- Weight: 55 kg (121 lb)

Sport
- Sport: Swimming
- Strokes: Synchronized swimming
- Club: SY Bern
- Coach: Yuliya Vasilyeva

Anja Nyffeler (born 25 November 1992) is a Swiss competitor in synchronized swimming who competed in the 2011 World Aquatics Championships, 2013 World Aquatics Championships, and 2012 Summer Olympics.
