= Wyssachen =

- Municipality
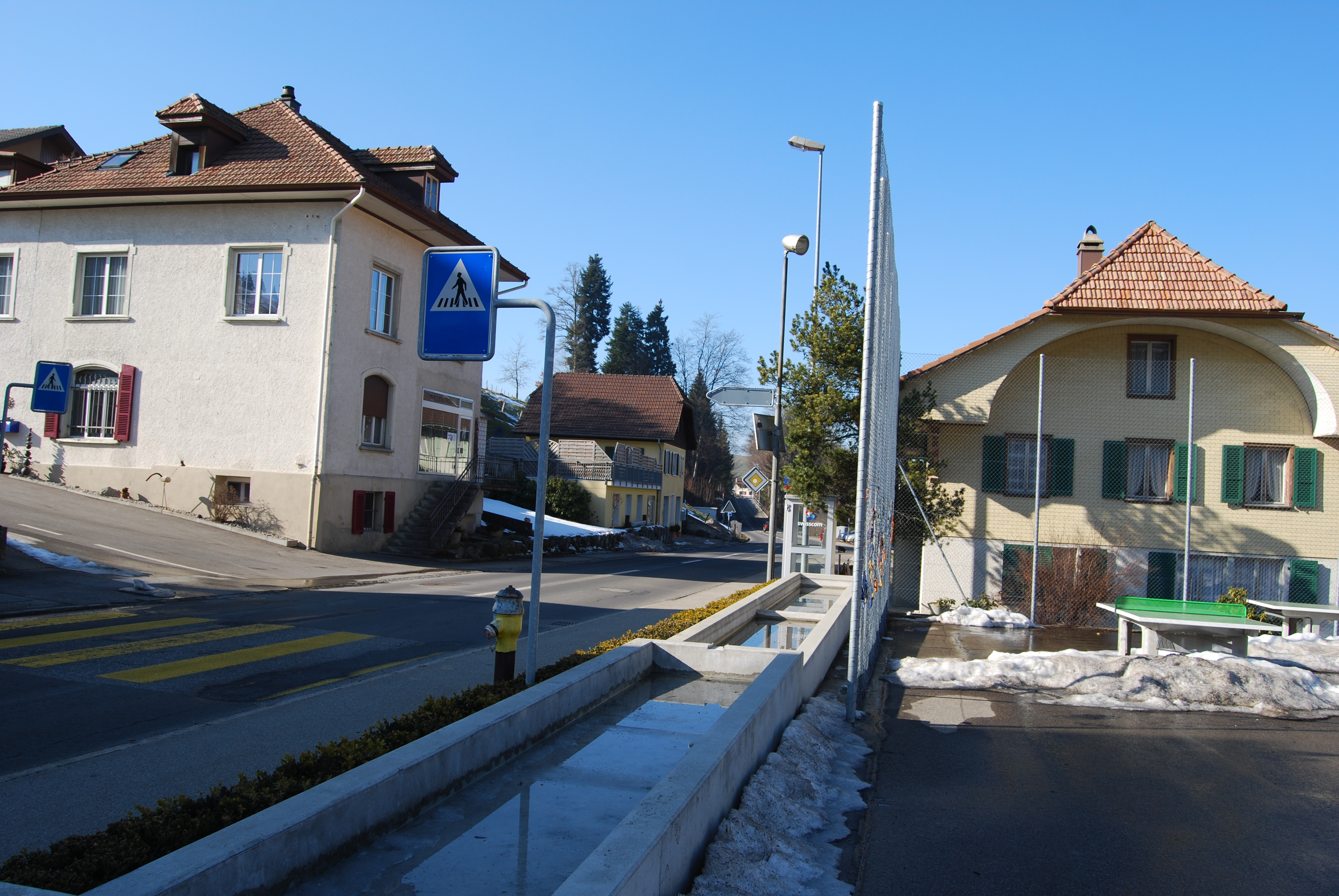

- Flag Coat of arms
- Location of Wyssachen
- Location within Switzerland Location within Canton of Bern
- Coordinates: 47°5′N 7°50′E
- Country: Switzerland
- Canton: Bern
- District: Oberaargau

Government
  - Mayor: Hanspeter Baltensberger

Area
  - Total: 11.69 km^{2} (4.51 sq mi)
- Elevation: 707 m (2,320 ft)

Population (Dec 2012)
  - Total: 1,162
  - Density: 99.40/km^{2} (257.4/sq mi)
- Time zone: UTC+01:00 (CET)
  - Summer (DST): UTC+02:00 (CEST)
- Postal code: 4954
- SFOS number: 960
- ISO 3166 code: CH-BE
- Surrounded by: Dürrenroth, Eriswil, Huttwil, Sumiswald
- Website: www.wyssachen.ch

Wyssachen is a municipality in the Oberaargau administrative district in the Swiss canton of Bern.

== History ==
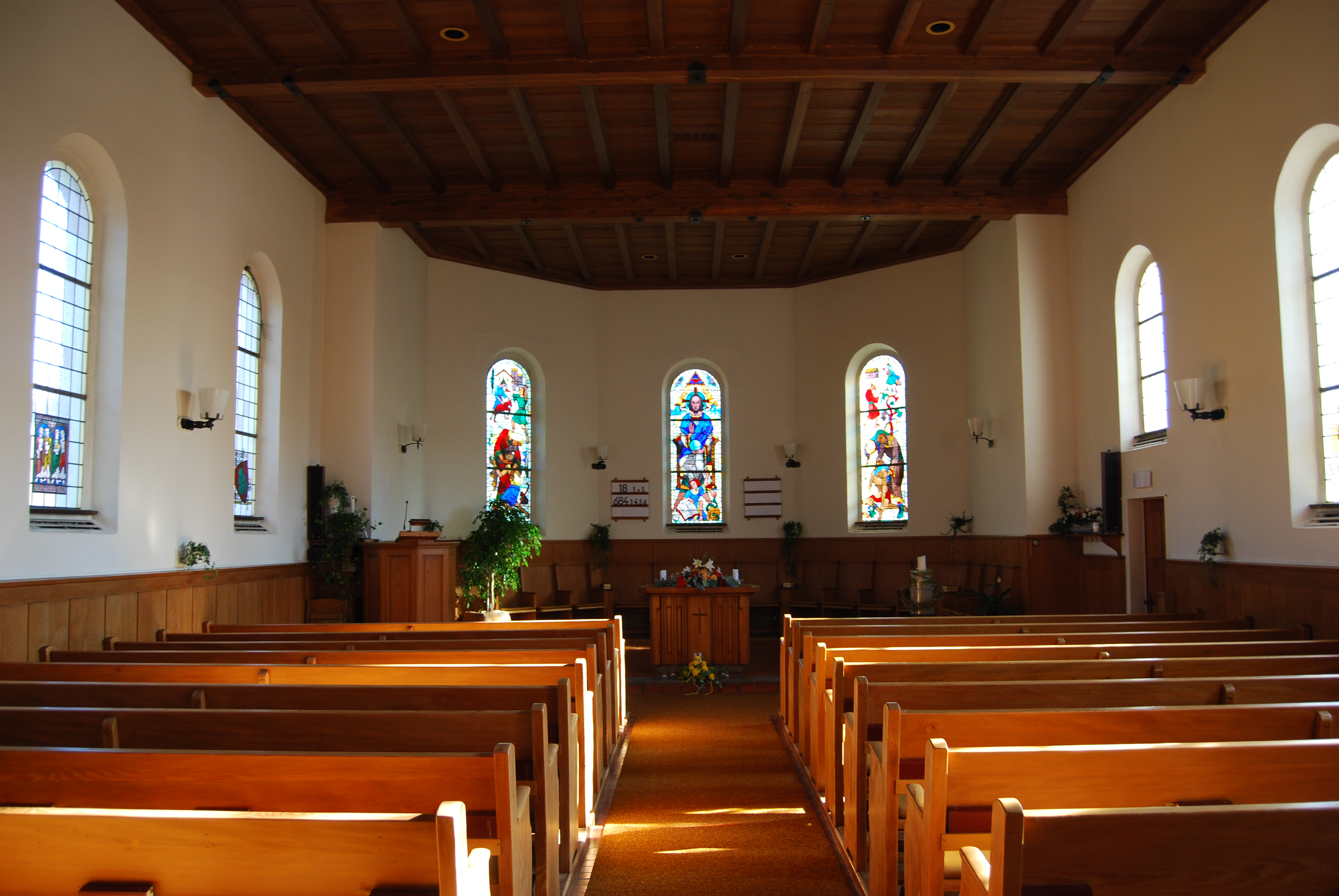
Interior of the parish church of Wyssachen, built in 1946.

Wyssachen is first mentioned in 1349 as Wissachon. Until 1908 it was officially known as Wyssachengraben or Grabengemeinde.

For much of its history, Wyssachen was part of the parish and municipality of Eriswil. In 1516 Eriswil became part of the Bernese district of Trachselwald. In 1755 Wyssachen began to care for the local poor independently of Eriswil. In 1796 they expanded their charitable operations and became increasingly independent of Eriswil. Finally in 1847 Wyssachen became an independent political municipality. The 334 inhabitants of Neuligen and Schwendi left Wyssachen to become part of Eriswil in 1888. A village church was built in 1946 and twenty years later became the parish church of the Wyssachen parish.

== Geography ==
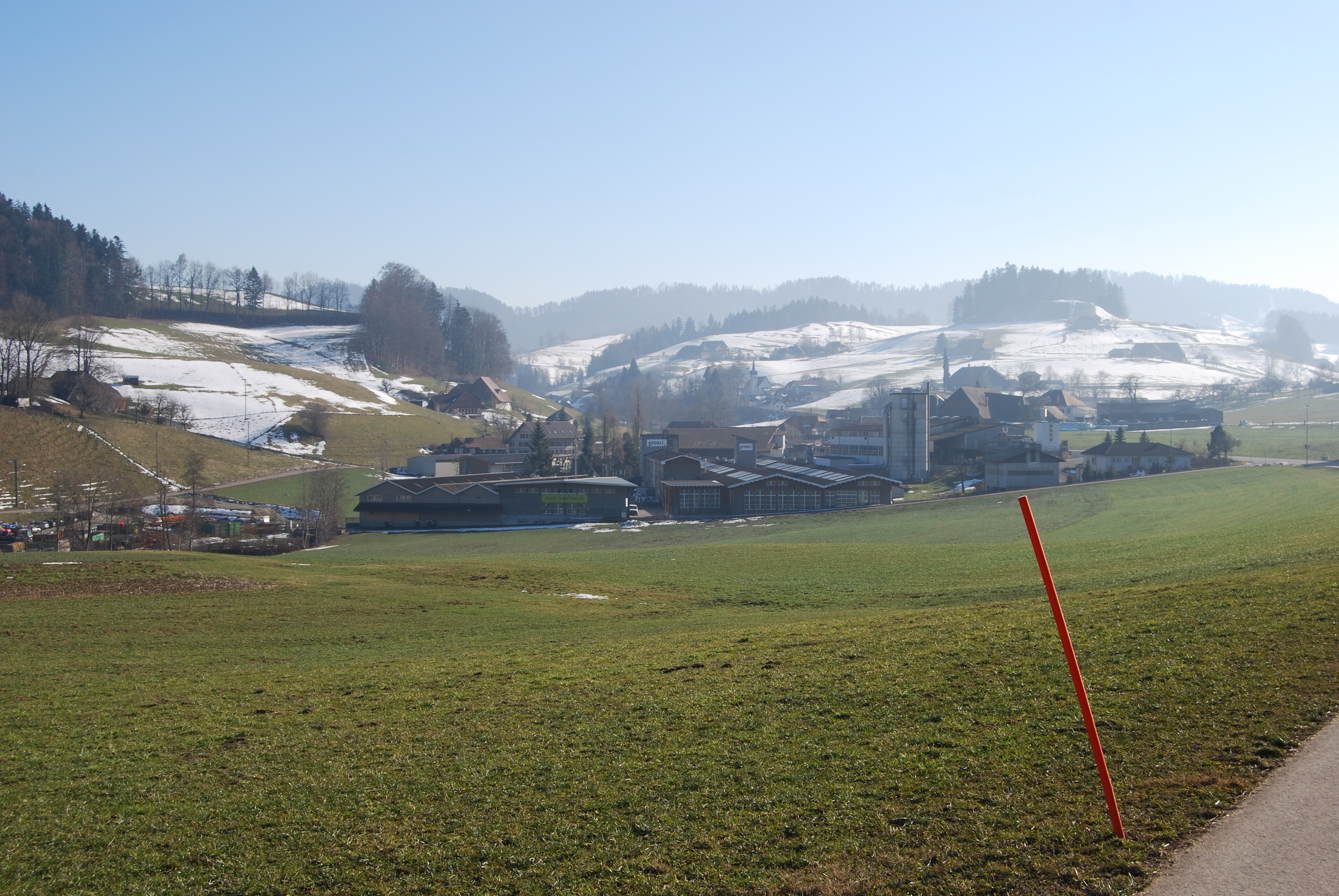
Wyssachen village and surrounding hills

Wyssachen has an area of 11.69 km^{2} (4.51 sq mi). As of the 2006 survey, a total of 8.3 km^{2} (3.2 mi^{2}) or 70.9% is used for agricultural purposes, while 2.64 km^{2} (1.02 mi^{2}) or 22.6% is forested. Of rest of the municipality 0.78 km^{2} (0.30 mi^{2}) or 6.7% is settled (buildings or roads), 0.03 km^{2} (7.4 acres) or 0.3% is either rivers or lakes and 0.01 km^{2} (2.5 acres) or 0.1% is unproductive land.

From the same survey, housing and buildings made up 4.0% and transportation infrastructure made up 1.9%. A total of 19.2% of the total land area is heavily forested and 3.3% is covered with orchards or small clusters of trees. Of the agricultural land, 19.5% is used for growing crops and 49.2% is pasturage, while 2.2% is used for orchards or vine crops. All the water in the municipality is flowing water.

Originally consisting of scattered farm houses without a true village center, in the last century the village school house and surrounding buildings have become the municipal core. In addition to the new village center, the remainder of the residents live in scattered farm houses or farm house clusters.

On 31 December 2009 Amtsbezirk Trachselwald, the municipality's former district, was dissolved. On the following day, 1 January 2010, it joined the newly created Verwaltungskreis Oberaargau.

== Coat of arms ==
The blazon of the municipal coat of arms is Gules between a Pall wavy Argent in chief a Mullet Or. The wavy white line symbolizes the Wyssachen river ("weissen Bach" or white brook), making this an example of canting arms.

== Demographics ==
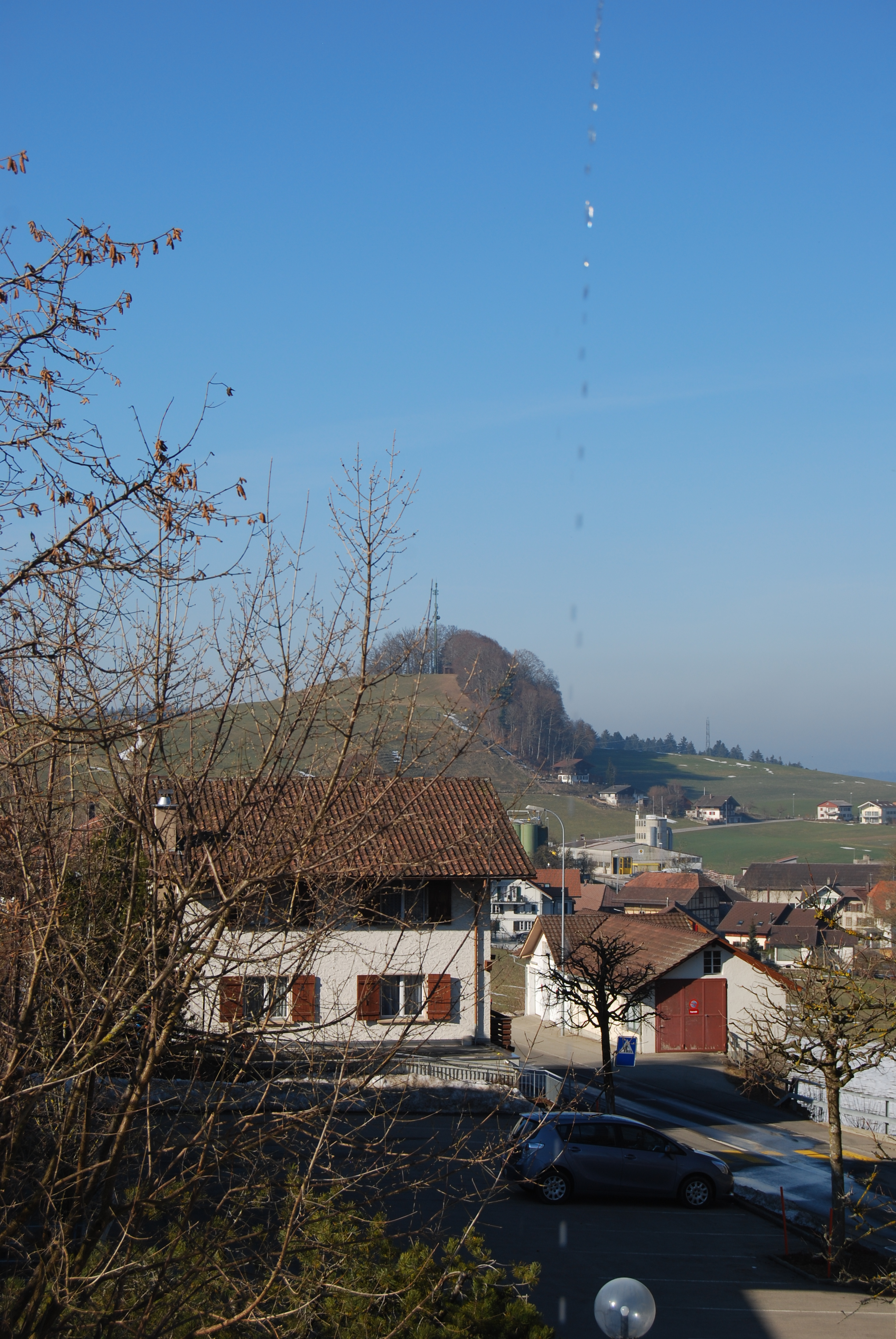
Houses in Wyssachen

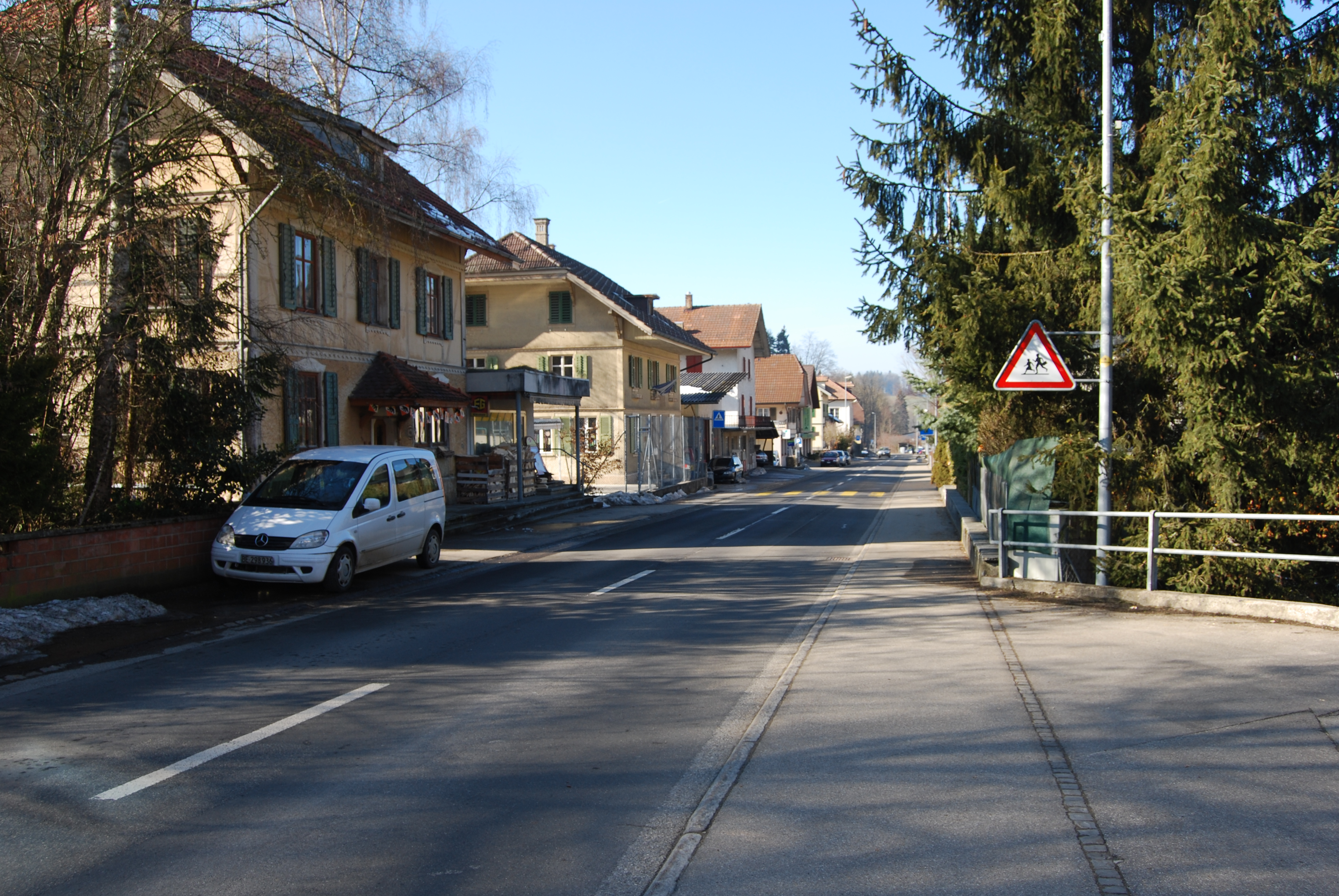
Main road through Wyssachen

Wyssachen has a population (as of December 2020) of 1,103. As of 2012, 3.3% of the population are resident foreign nationals. Between the last 2 years (2010-2012) the population changed at a rate of -0.3%. Migration accounted for 0.1%, while births and deaths accounted for -0.3%.

Most of the population (as of 2000) speaks German (1,175 or 98.1%) as their first language, Albanian is the second most common (12 or 1.0%) and French is the third (2 or 0.2%). There are 2 people who speak Italian and 1 person who speaks Romansh.

As of 2013, the population was 50.7% male and 49.3% female. The population was made up of 561 Swiss men (48.6% of the population) and 24 (2.1%) non-Swiss men. There were 547 Swiss women (47.4%) and 22 (1.9%) non-Swiss women. Of the population in the municipality, 642 or about 53.6% were born in Wyssachen and lived there in 2000. There were 359 or 30.0% who were born in the same canton, while 113 or 9.4% were born somewhere else in Switzerland, and 29 or 2.4% were born outside of Switzerland.

As of 2012, children and teenagers (0–19 years old) make up 22.3% of the population, while adults (20–64 years old) make up 59.8% and seniors (over 64 years old) make up 17.9%.

As of 2000, there were 506 people who were single and never married in the municipality. There were 595 married individuals, 67 widows or widowers and 30 individuals who are divorced.

As of 2010, there were 119 households that consist of only one person and 48 households with five or more people. In 2000, a total of 432 apartments (83.6% of the total) were permanently occupied, while 54 apartments (10.4%) were seasonally occupied and 31 apartments (6.0%) were empty. As of 2012, the construction rate of new housing units was 0.9 new units per 1000 residents. The vacancy rate for the municipality, in 2013, was 1.8%. In 2012, single family homes made up 35.9% of the total housing in the municipality.

The historical population is given in the following chart:

== Economy ==
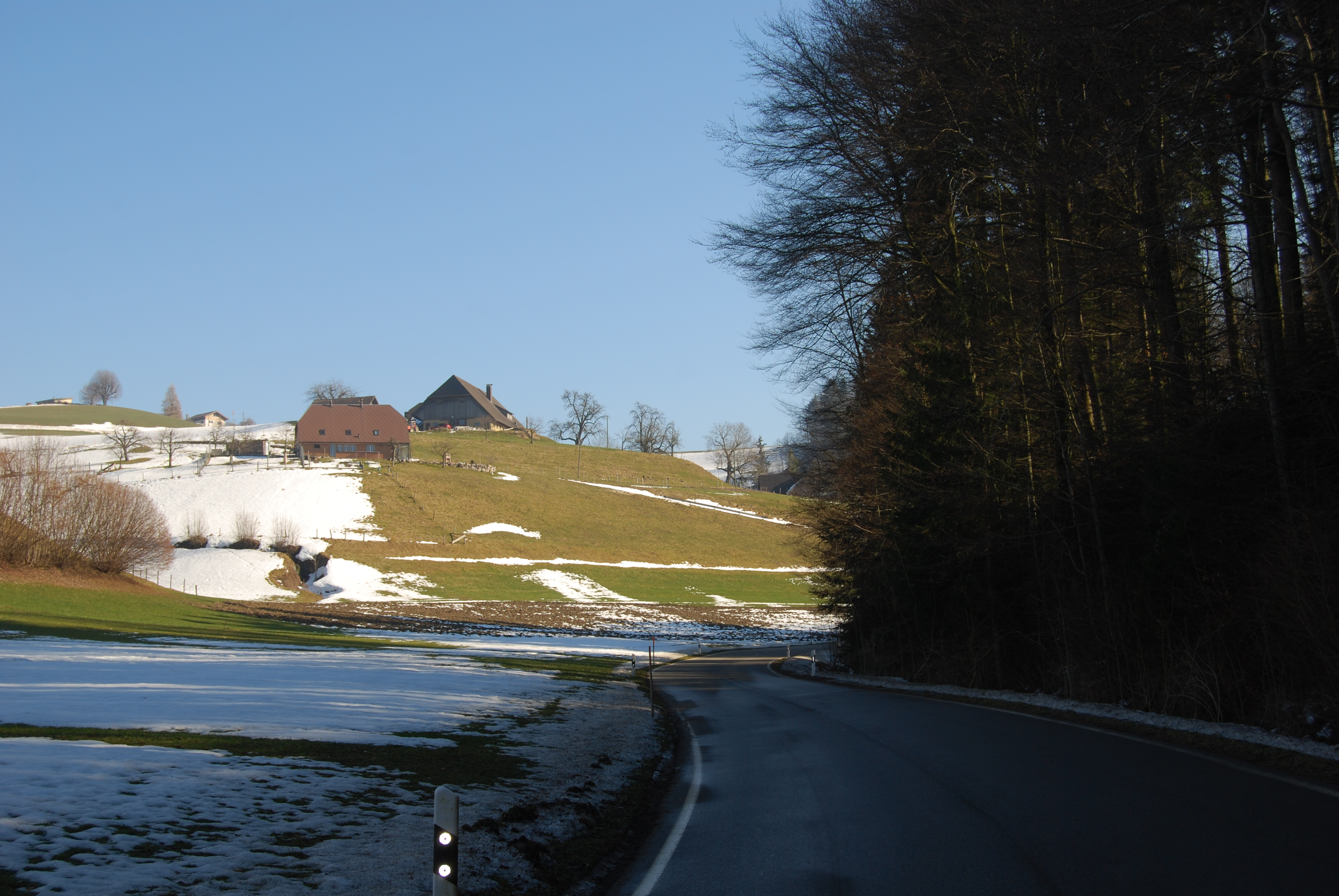
Farm houses in Wyssachen. Farming still provides over a quarter of jobs in the municipality

As of 2011, Wyssachen had an unemployment rate of 1.26%. As of 2011, there were a total of 467 people employed in the municipality. Of these, there were 160 people employed in the primary economic sector and about 65 businesses involved in this sector. The secondary sector employs 180 people and there were 24 businesses in this sector. The tertiary sector employs 127 people, with 32 businesses in this sector. There were 573 residents of the municipality who were employed in some capacity, of which females made up 38.4% of the workforce.

In 2008 there were a total of 395 full-time equivalent jobs. The number of jobs in the primary sector was 113, all of which were in agriculture. The number of jobs in the secondary sector was 214 of which 147 or (68.7%) were in manufacturing and 67 (31.3%) were in construction. The number of jobs in the tertiary sector was 68. In the tertiary sector; 11 or 16.2% were in wholesale or retail sales or the repair of motor vehicles, 13 or 19.1% were in the movement and storage of goods, 15 or 22.1% were in a hotel or restaurant, 4 or 5.9% were the insurance or financial industry, 12 or 17.6% were in education.

In 2000, there were 133 workers who commuted into the municipality and 284 workers who commuted away. The municipality is a net exporter of workers, with about 2.1 workers leaving the municipality for every one entering. A total of 289 workers (68.5% of the 422 total workers in the municipality) both lived and worked in Wyssachen. Of the working population, 4.7% used public transportation to get to work, and 54.6% used a private car.

In 2013 the average church, local and cantonal tax rate on a married resident, with two children, of Wyssachen making 150,000 CHF was 12.3%, while an unmarried resident's rate was 18.9%. For comparison, the median rate for all municipalities in the entire canton was 11.7% and 18.1%, while the nationwide median was 10.6% and 17.4% respectively.

In 2011 there were a total of 368 tax payers in the municipality. Of that total, 70 made over 75,000 CHF per year. There were 2 people who made between 15,000 and 20,000 per year. The greatest number of workers, 94, made between 50,000 and 75,000 CHF per year. The average income of the over 75,000 CHF group in Wyssachen was 115,077 CHF, while the average across all of Switzerland was 136,785 CHF.

In 2011 a total of 1.9% of the population received direct financial assistance from the government.

== Politics ==
In the 2011 federal election the most popular party was the Swiss People's Party (SVP) which received 49.0% of the vote. The next three most popular parties were the Conservative Democratic Party (BDP) (17.4%), the Federal Democratic Union of Switzerland (EDU) (11.2%) and the Evangelical People's Party (EVP) (6.1%). In the federal election, a total of 486 votes were cast, and the voter turnout was 49.7%.

== Religion ==
From the 2000 census, 987 or 82.4% belonged to the Swiss Reformed Church, while 43 or 3.6% were Roman Catholic. Of the rest of the population, there was 1 member of an Orthodox church, there were 2 individuals (or about 0.17% of the population) who belonged to the Christian Catholic Church, and there were 45 individuals (or about 3.76% of the population) who belonged to another Christian church. There were 5 (or about 0.42% of the population) who were Muslim. There was 1 person who was Buddhist and 2 individuals who belonged to another church. 52 (or about 4.34% of the population) belonged to no church, are agnostic or atheist, and 60 individuals (or about 5.01% of the population) did not answer the question.

== Education ==
In Wyssachen about 58.9% of the population have completed non-mandatory upper secondary education, and 10.8% have completed additional higher education (either university or a Fachhochschule). Of the 73 who had completed some form of tertiary schooling listed in the census, 78.1% were Swiss men, 19.2% were Swiss women.

As of 2000, there were a total of 112 students attending any school in the municipality. Of those, 111 both lived and attended school in the municipality, while one student came from another municipality. During the same year, 92 residents attended schools outside the municipality.
