= Pamela Fischer (synchronized swimmer) =

Swiss synchronized swimmer

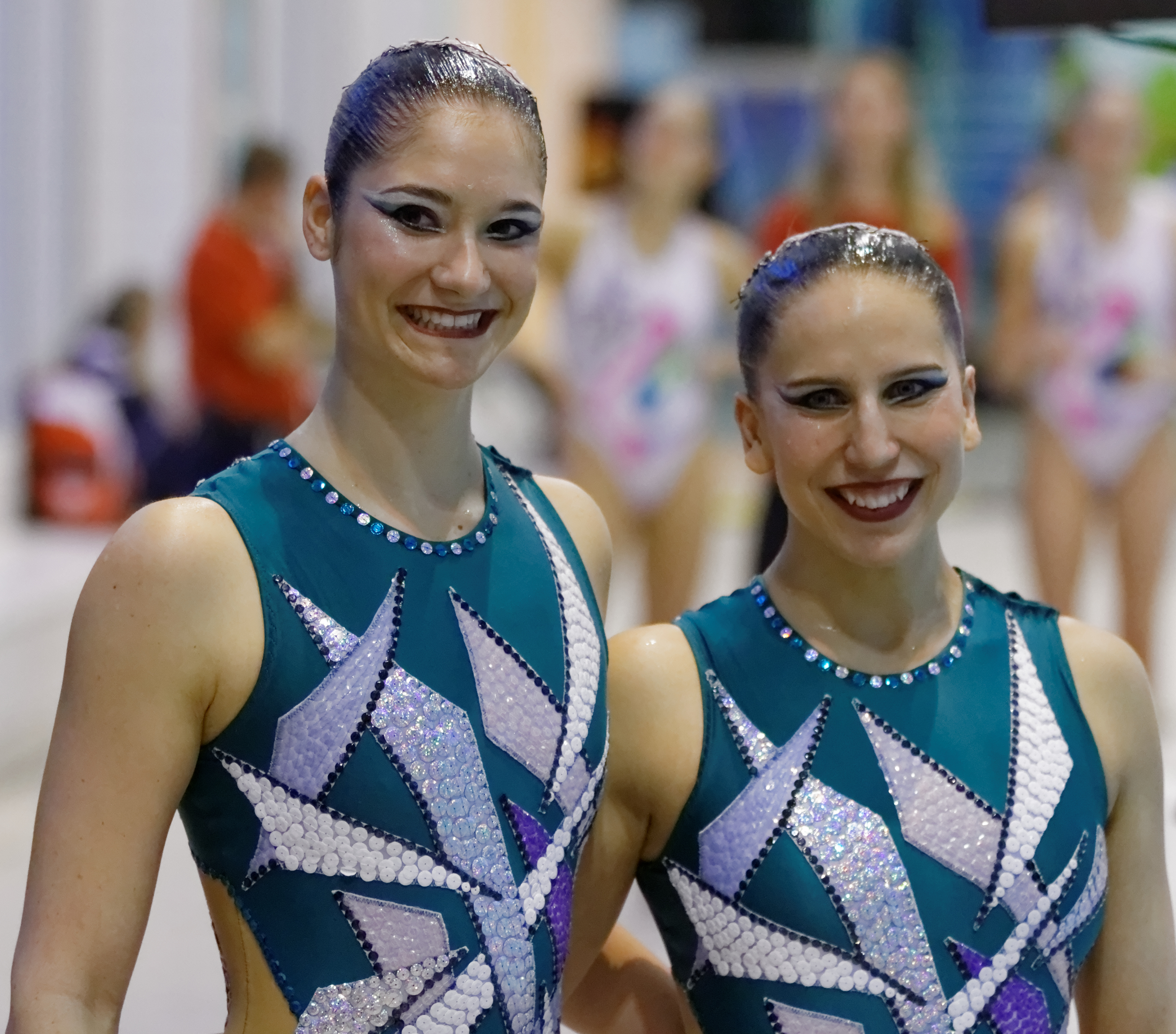
- Anja Nyffeler (left) and Pamela Fischer in March 2013

Personal information
- Nationality: Switzerland
- Born: 7 April 1988 (age 38) Lausanne, Switzerland
- Height: 158 cm (5 ft 2 in)
- Weight: 49 kg (108 lb)

Sport
- Sport: Swimming
- Strokes: Synchronized swimming
- Club: Lausanne Natation
- Coach: Yuliya Vasilyeva

Pamela Fischer (born 7 April 1988 in Lausanne) is a Swiss competitor in synchronized swimming who competed in the 2004 European Championships, 2005 World Aquatics Championships, 2006 European Aquatics Championships, 2007 World Aquatics Championships, 2008 European Aquatics Championships, 2009 World Aquatics Championships, 2010 European Aquatics Championships, 2011 World Aquatics Championships, 2012 European Aquatics Championships, 2013 World Aquatics Championships, and 2012 Summer Olympics.

Fischer announced her retirement after the Barcelona World Championships 2013 at the age of 25.

== Early life ==
She started synchronized swimming at the age of 4 and half at the Pully Natation club, and went on to swim at the Lausanne Natation in 1998. She already knew that she wanted to compete at the Olympics and she did everything she could to realize her dream.

== Career ==
Pamela had many duet partners before meeting Anja Nyffeler in September 2010.

2000 was her first gold medal as a soloist at the Swiss Junior National Championships. She won this title again in 2003. In 2006 she won the solo event again, and also the duet with Aude Bellina at the Swiss Junior National Championships.

Fischer competed from 2002 to 2006 with the Swiss Junior National team, and from 2003 to 2013 with the Swiss National Team.

At the World Junior Synchronized Swimming in 2006, she finished 11th in solo and 10th in duet with Aude.

The World Aquatics Championships in 2009 was the first time she represented the Swiss senior team in the solo event. She finished 14th.

At the 2013 World Aquatics Championships in Barcelona she finished 14th in solo and 12th in duet with Anja Nyffeler.

Since September 2014, she trains the new generation of Lausanne Natation swimmers.
