= Huttwil =

- Municipality
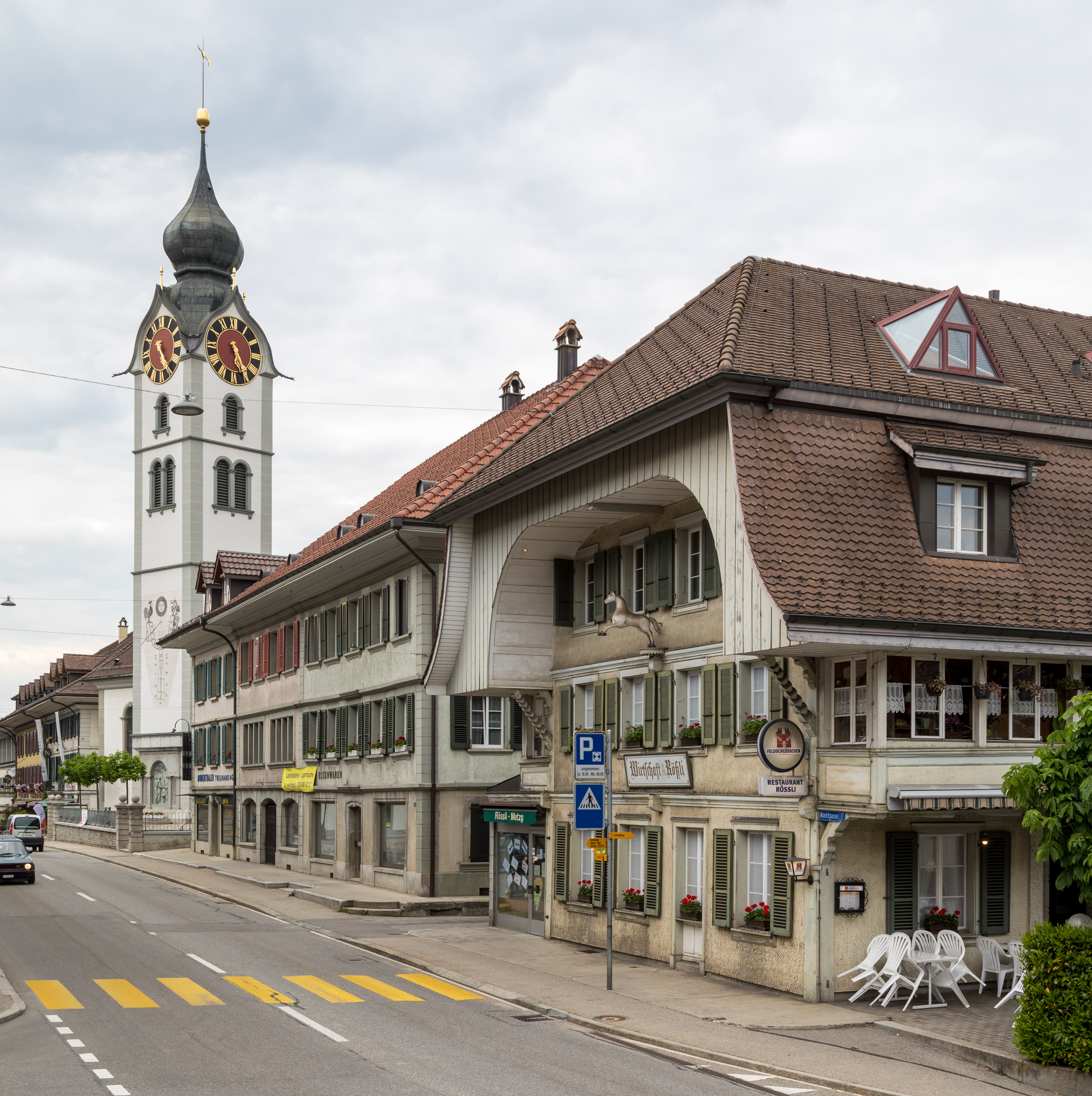
- Marktgasse and Reformed Church

- Flag Coat of arms
- Location of Huttwil
- Location within Switzerland Location within Canton of Bern
- Coordinates: 47°7′N 7°51′E
- Country: Switzerland
- Canton: Bern
- District: Oberaargau

Government
  - Mayor: Hansjörg Muralt

Area
  - Total: 17.3 km^{2} (6.7 sq mi)
- Elevation: 638 m (2,093 ft)

Population (Dec 2012)
  - Total: 4,663
  - Density: 270/km^{2} (698/sq mi)
- Time zone: UTC+01:00 (CET)
  - Summer (DST): UTC+02:00 (CEST)
- Postal code: 4950
- SFOS number: 954
- ISO 3166 code: CH-BE
- Localities: Schwarzenbach
- Surrounded by: Auswil, Dürrenroth, Eriswil, Gondiswil, Rohrbach, Rohrbachgraben, Ufhusen (LU), Wyssachen
- Website: www.huttwil.ch

Huttwil is a municipality in the Oberaargau administrative district in the Swiss canton of Bern.

== History ==
=== Early history ===
Huttwil is first mentioned in the 9th Century as Huttiwilare.

The Huttwil area was probably first settled in the 7th or 8th century, though it first appears in historic records in the 9th century. Initially it was part of the Upper Aargau lands of the Adalgoze family, though by the 11th and 12th centuries the Counts of Rheinfelden and Fenis-Neuchâtel owned land and rights in Huttwil. In the 12th century Fenis-Neuchâtel donated their Huttwil lands to Erlach Abbey. The village church is first mentioned in 1093 or 1108 when Agnes von Rheinfelden and her husband Berchtold II von Zähringen donated the patronage rights to the Abbey of Saint Peter in the Black Forest. The remainder of the Rheinfelden rights passed to the Zähringens through Agnes' marriage. When the Zähringen family died out in 1218 the Counts of Kyburg acquired the growing town and surrounding lands. In 1313 the Counts of Neu-Kyburg gave Huttwil to their overlord, the Austrian Habsburgs. Following the surprising Swiss Confederation and Bernese victory at the Battle of Laupen in 1339, Bernese troops destroyed the Habsburg town of Huttwil in 1340. Though the town was rebuilt and the Kyburgs remained in power Huttwil came increasingly under the Bernese sphere of influence. Over the following centuries it was owned by a Bernese noble family before being completely absorbed into the Bernese bailiwick of Trachselwald in 1516.

In 1528 Bern adopted the new faith of the Protestant Reformation and Huttwil converted along with the rest of the Bernese lands. When they suppressed Erlach Abbey in the same year, the Abbey's rights and lands from the Counts of Fenis-Neuchâtel were acquired by Bern.

=== Swiss peasant war of 1653 ===
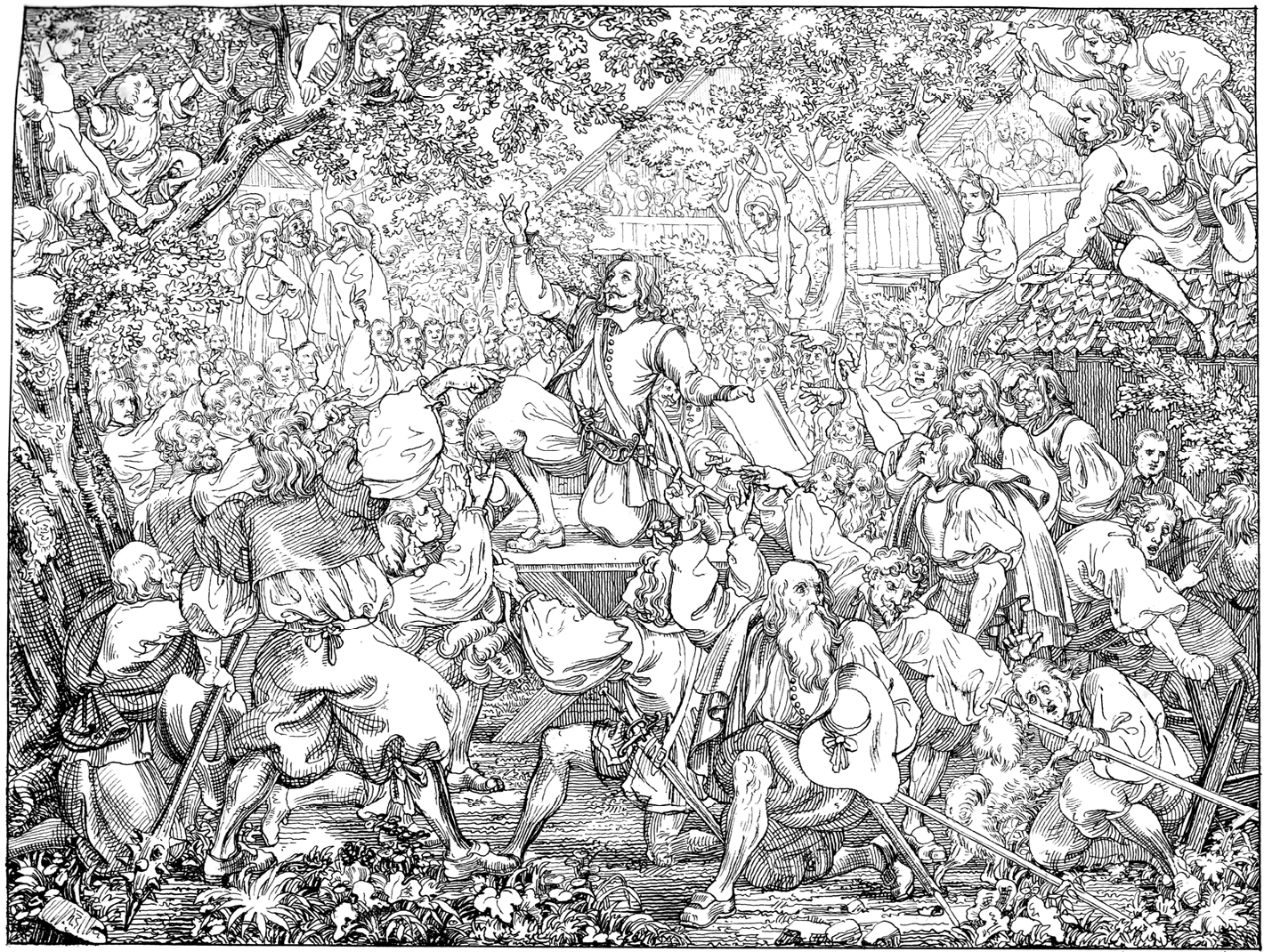
The allegiance oath of Huttwil, in the Peasant War of 1653

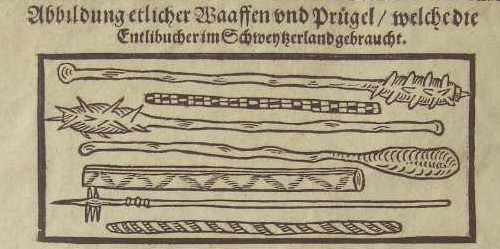
Some of the weapons used in the War

During the Swiss peasant war of 1653, Huttwil was a center of the rebellion. On 23 April 1653, representatives of the people of the countryside of Lucerne, Bern, Basel, and Solothurn met at Sumiswald and concluded an alliance to help each other to achieve their goals. A week later, they met again at Huttwil, where they renewed that alliance and elected Niklaus Leuenberger from Rüderswil in the Emmental as their leader.

On 14 May 1653, the peasants met again at a Landsgemeinde at Huttwil and formalized their alliance as the "League of Huttwil" by signing a written contract in the style of the old Bundesbriefe of the Old Swiss Confederacy. The treaty clearly established the league as a separate political entity that considered itself equal to and independent from the cities. The tax revolt had become an independence movement, based ideologically on the traditional Swiss founding legends, especially on the legend of William Tell. Legally, the peasants justified their assemblies and their union by the rights of old and in particular the Stanser Verkommnis of 1481, one of the important coalition treaties of the Old Swiss Confederacy.

Though the Huttwil League was initially successful and forced Bern and Lucerne to sign peace treaties and grant concessions, on 3 June 1653 they were decisively defeated in the Battle of Wohlenschwil. Bernese troops then burned villages and crushed further resistance over the following month. Niklaus Leuenberger was beheaded and quartered at Bern on September 6, 1653; his head was nailed at the gallows together with one of the four copies of the Bundesbrief of the Huttwil League.

=== After the war to modern times ===
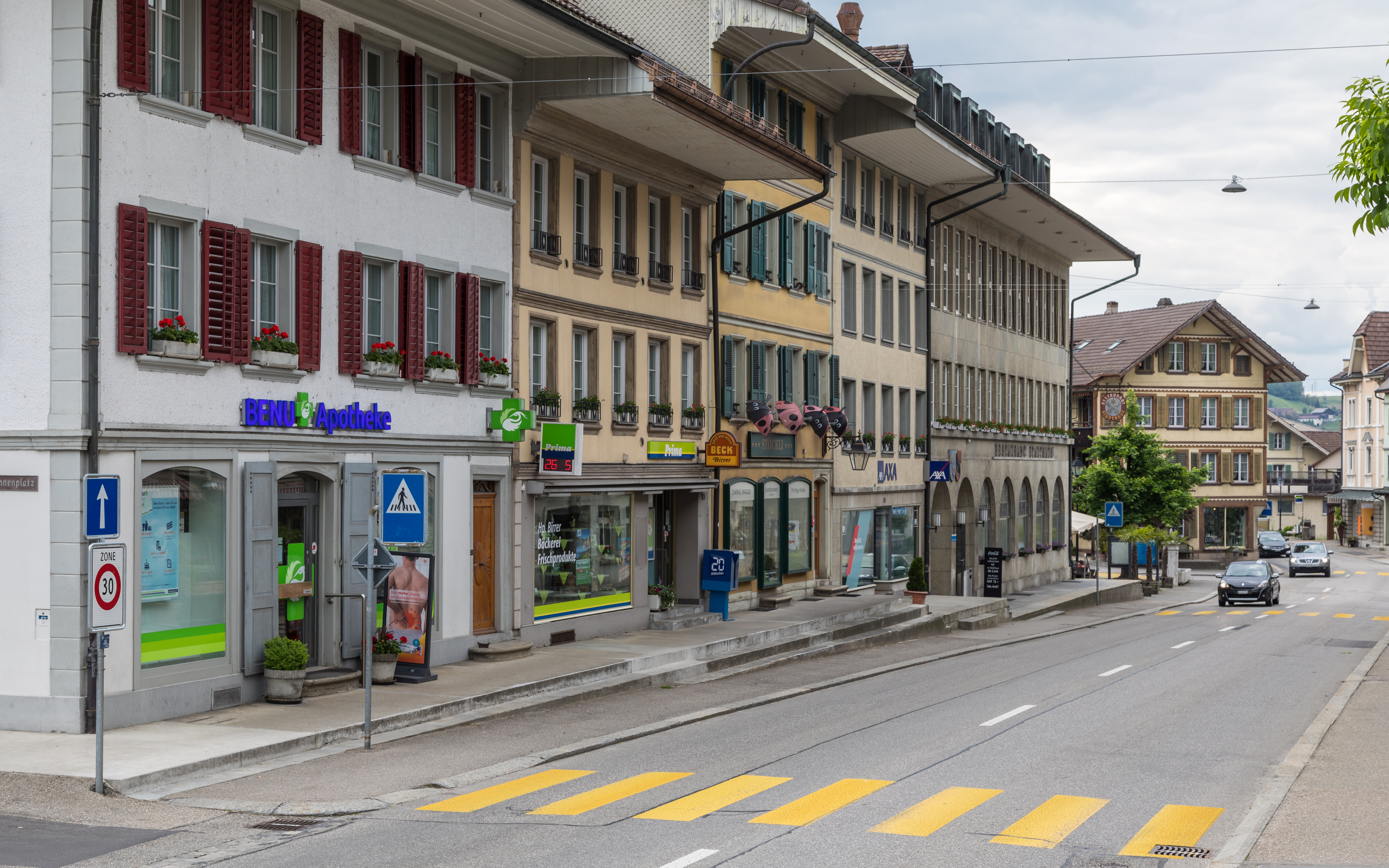
Marktgasse (Market Street)

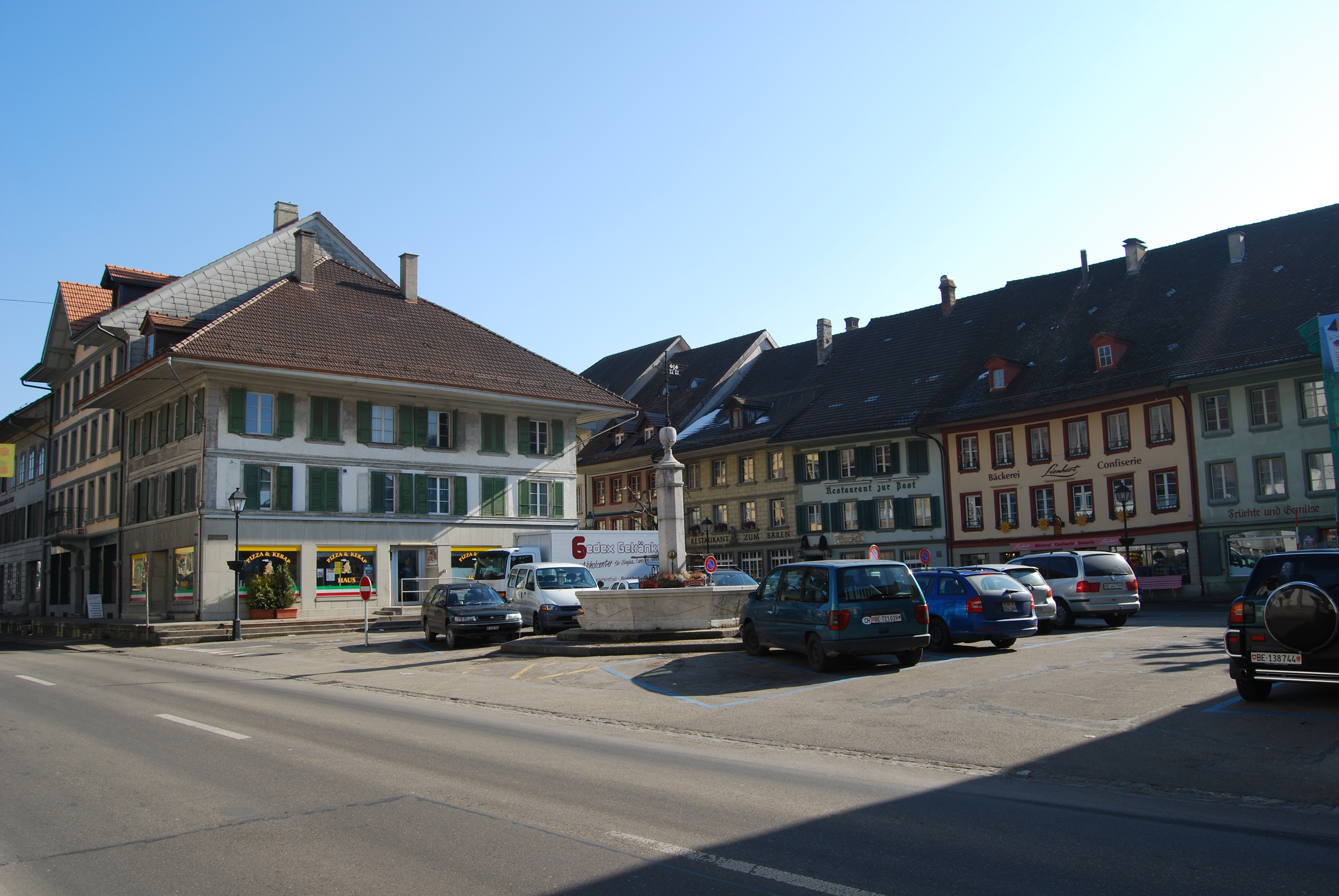
Central plaza and fountain from the reconstruction after the 1834 fire.

While the Swiss peasant war was unsuccessful, it forced Bernese authorities to reform the tax structure and respect the rights of the peasants. While Huttwil was the center of the revolt, it was not punished further by the authorities. Huttwil's location on the Bern-Lucerne road allowed it to continue to grow. While agriculture remained important, it became a regional market town and other industries began to develop. During the ancien regime period tensions rose between the well-off town citizens who owned much of the farming land and the poor sharecropper Tauner who worked the land and had few rights. Even the reforms of the 1798 French invasion and the Helvetic Republic failed to address the old power structure in the town. Finally in 1828, the citizens lost their special rights and the commons were divided between the former Tauner.

Throughout the 19th century a number of factories and small shops opened in the town, including canvas weaving, spinning wool, horsehair spinning, knitting mills, tanneries, sawmills and furniture manufacturing. Today the manufacturing sector in Huttwil provides about one-third of all jobs in the municipality.

On the night of 8/9 June 1834 much of the town was destroyed in a fire. The entire town was rebuilt according to plans from Bern's city architect, Johann Daniel Osterrieth. He planned a town center with three main roads around a central plaza with fountains. The streets were lined with half-timbered Country-Biedermeier houses which reflected the growing prosperity of the town. The village church was rebuilt on the old foundations, but with a higher tower and a new onion dome.

An attempt to build a railway from Bern through Huttwil and the lower Emmental to Lucerne in 1871 failed. It took almost two decades before Huttwil was eventually connected to a railway. The Langenthal–Huttwil railway opened in 1889, followed by the Huttwil–Wolhusen railway in 1895, the Ramsei-Sumiswald line in 1908 and the Eriswil line in 1915. The railway connected Huttwil to the rest of the country and allowed industry to grow in the town. The first three railways eventually merged into the United Huttwil Railway (Vereinigten Huttwil-Bahnen) which in 1997 became the Regionalverkehr Mittelland AG.

Due to Huttwil being a regional center a secondary school opened in the town in 1873. A district hospital opened a few years later, in 1903. The original hospital was replaced with a new building in 1929 and the old hospital became a retirement home. In 1939 a Roman Catholic church was built in Huttwil for the Catholic residents of the village. The Brother Klaus Church was rebuilt to its current appearance in 1983.

== Geography ==
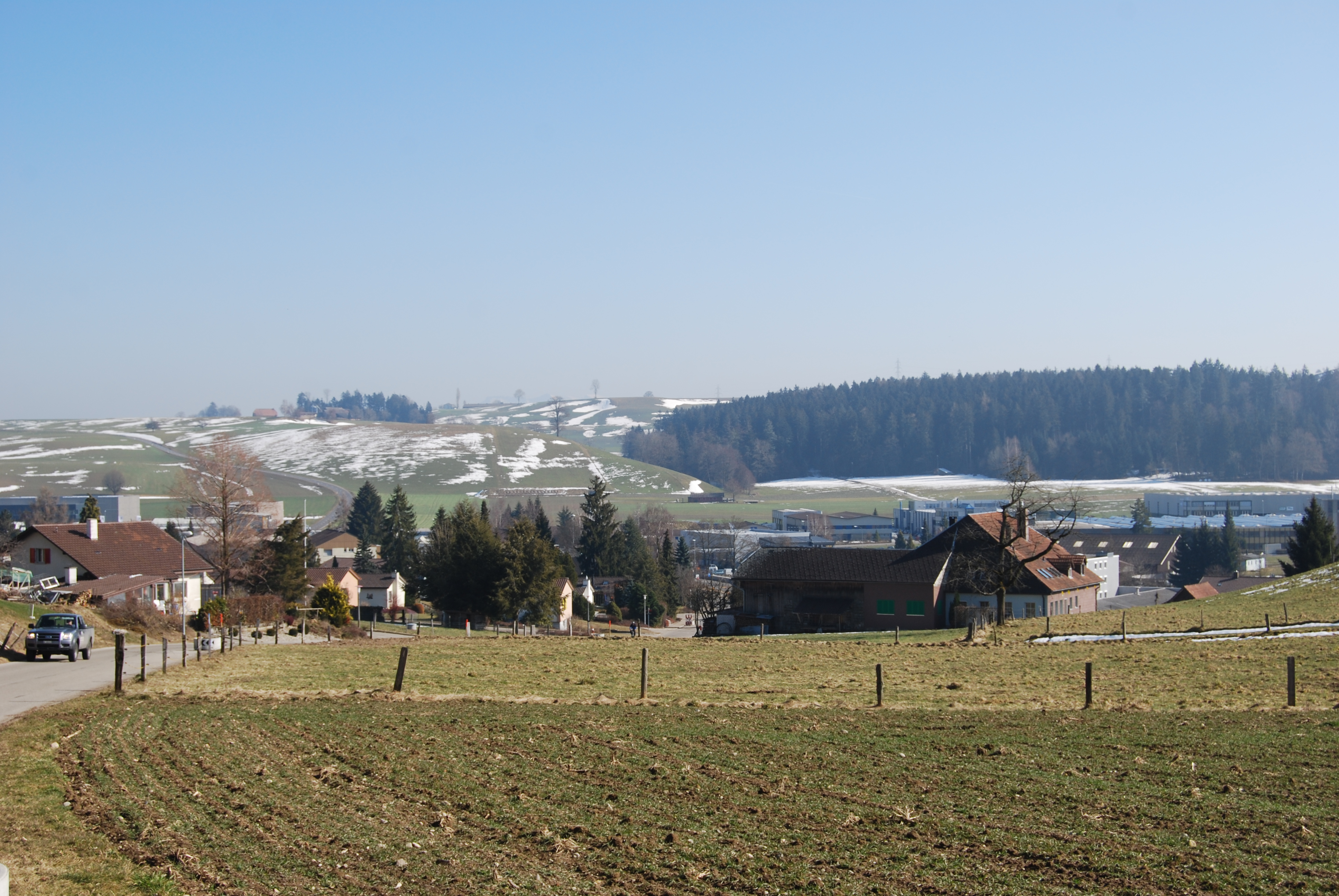
Huttwil town and surrounding farms

Aerial view by Walter Mittelholzer (1923)

Huttwil has an area of 17.24 km^{2} (6.66 sq mi). As of the 2006 survey, a total of 11.13 km^{2} (4.30 mi^{2}) or 64.6% is used for agricultural purposes, while 3.79 km^{2} (1.46 mi^{2}) or 22.0% is forested. Of rest of the municipality 2.35 km^{2} (0.91 mi^{2}) or 13.6% is settled (buildings or roads), 0.01 km^{2} (2.5 acres) or 0.1% is either rivers or lakes.

From the same survey, industrial buildings made up 1.7% of the total area while housing and buildings made up 6.4% and transportation infrastructure made up 4.6%. A total of 19.9% of the total land area is heavily forested and 2.1% is covered with orchards or small clusters of trees. Of the agricultural land, 29.9% is used for growing crops and 32.0% is pasturage, while 2.6% is used for orchards or vine crops. All the water in the municipality is flowing water.

It is situated in the lower Emmental on the border with the Canton of Lucerne between Eriswil, Wyssachen, Dürrenroth and Walterswil. The main town is near the confluence of the Langeten, Rotbach and Wyssachen rivers. It consists of the town of Huttwil and a number of surrounding hamlets.

On 31 December 2009 Amtsbezirk Trachselwald, the municipality's former district, was dissolved. On the following day, 1 January 2010, it joined the newly created Verwaltungskreis Oberaargau.

== Coat of arms ==
The blazon of the municipal coat of arms is Azure two Keys Argent in Saltire and in chief a Mullet Or.

== Demographics ==
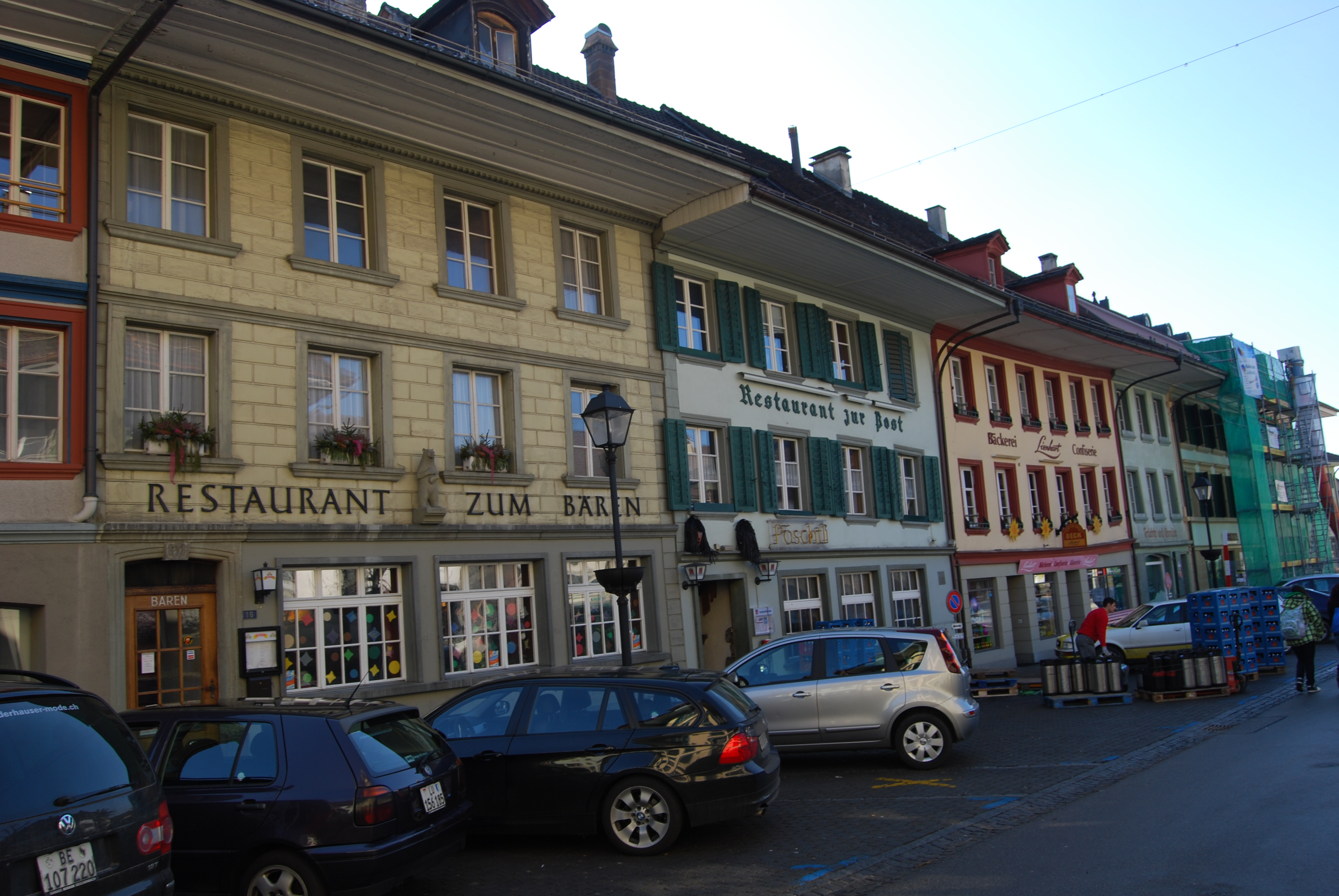
A row of restaurants in Huttwil.

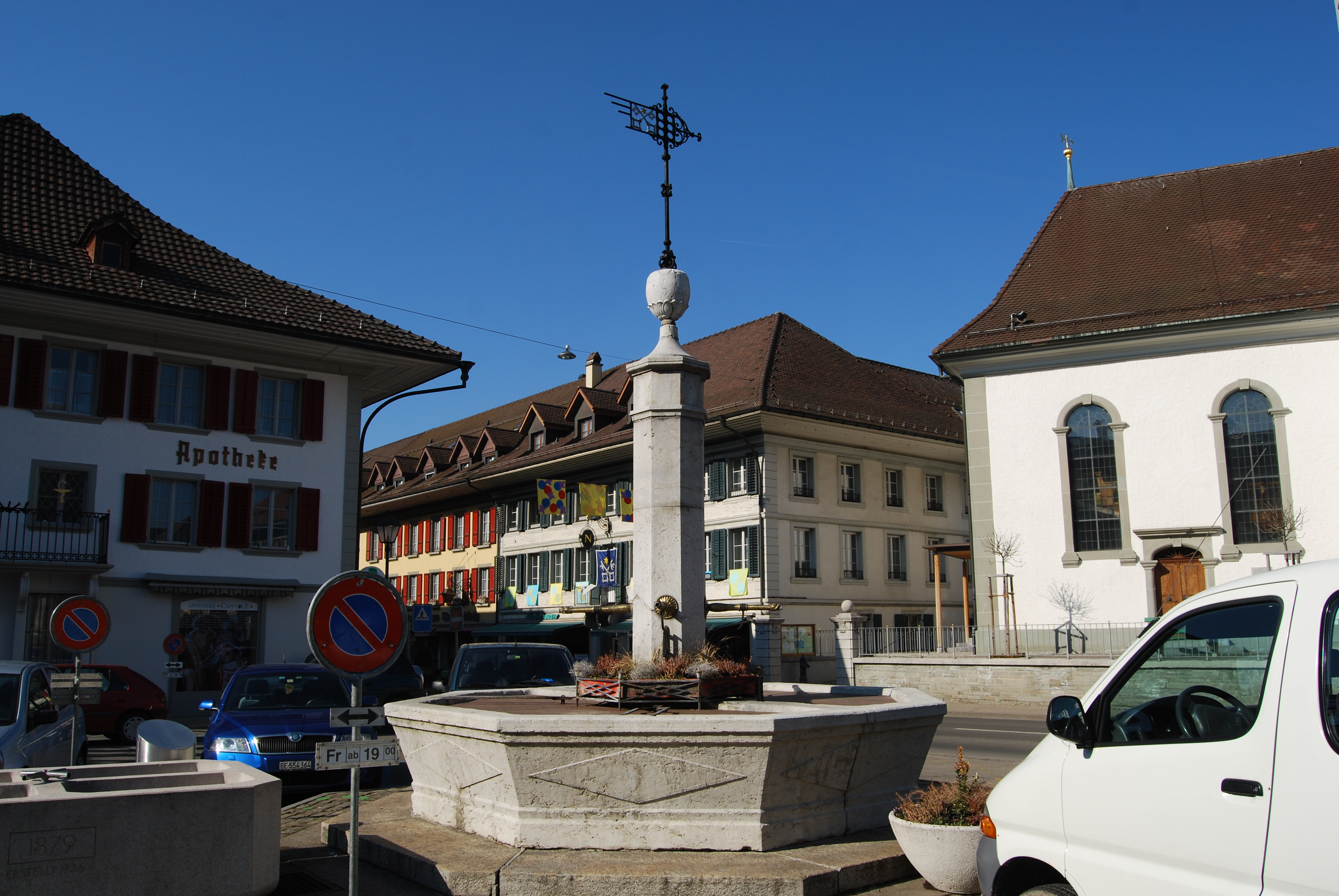
Central plaza and fountain in old Huttwil.

Huttwil has a population (as of December 2020) of 5,009. As of 2012, 9.4% of the population are resident foreign nationals. Between the last 2 years (2010-2012) the population changed at a rate of -0.9%. Migration accounted for -0.6%, while births and deaths accounted for -0.7%.

Most of the population (as of 2000) speaks German (4,514 or 93.6%) as their first language, Italian is the second most common (55 or 1.1%) and Albanian is the third (53 or 1.1%). There are 15 people who speak French and 2 people who speak Romansh.

As of 2013, the population was 50.3% male and 49.7% female. The population was made up of 2,088 Swiss men (44.4% of the population) and 277 (5.9%) non-Swiss men. There were 2,139 Swiss women (45.5%) and 202 (4.3%) non-Swiss women. Of the population in the municipality, 1,877 or about 38.9% were born in Huttwil and lived there in 2000. There were 1,544 or 32.0% who were born in the same canton, while 759 or 15.7% were born somewhere else in Switzerland, and 451 or 9.3% were born outside of Switzerland.

As of 2012, children and teenagers (0–19 years old) make up 20.7% of the population, while adults (20–64 years old) make up 59.3% and seniors (over 64 years old) make up 20.0%.

As of 2000, there were 1,996 people who were single and never married in the municipality. There were 2,280 married individuals, 359 widows or widowers and 190 individuals who are divorced.

As of 2010, there were 682 households that consist of only one person and 156 households with five or more people. In 2000, a total of 1,907 apartments (90.3% of the total) were permanently occupied, while 114 apartments (5.4%) were seasonally occupied and 91 apartments (4.3%) were empty. As of 2012, the construction rate of new housing units was 1.7 new units per 1000 residents. The vacancy rate for the municipality, in 2013, was 2.3%. In 2012, single family homes made up 46.7% of the total housing in the municipality.

The historical population is given in the following chart:

== Economy ==
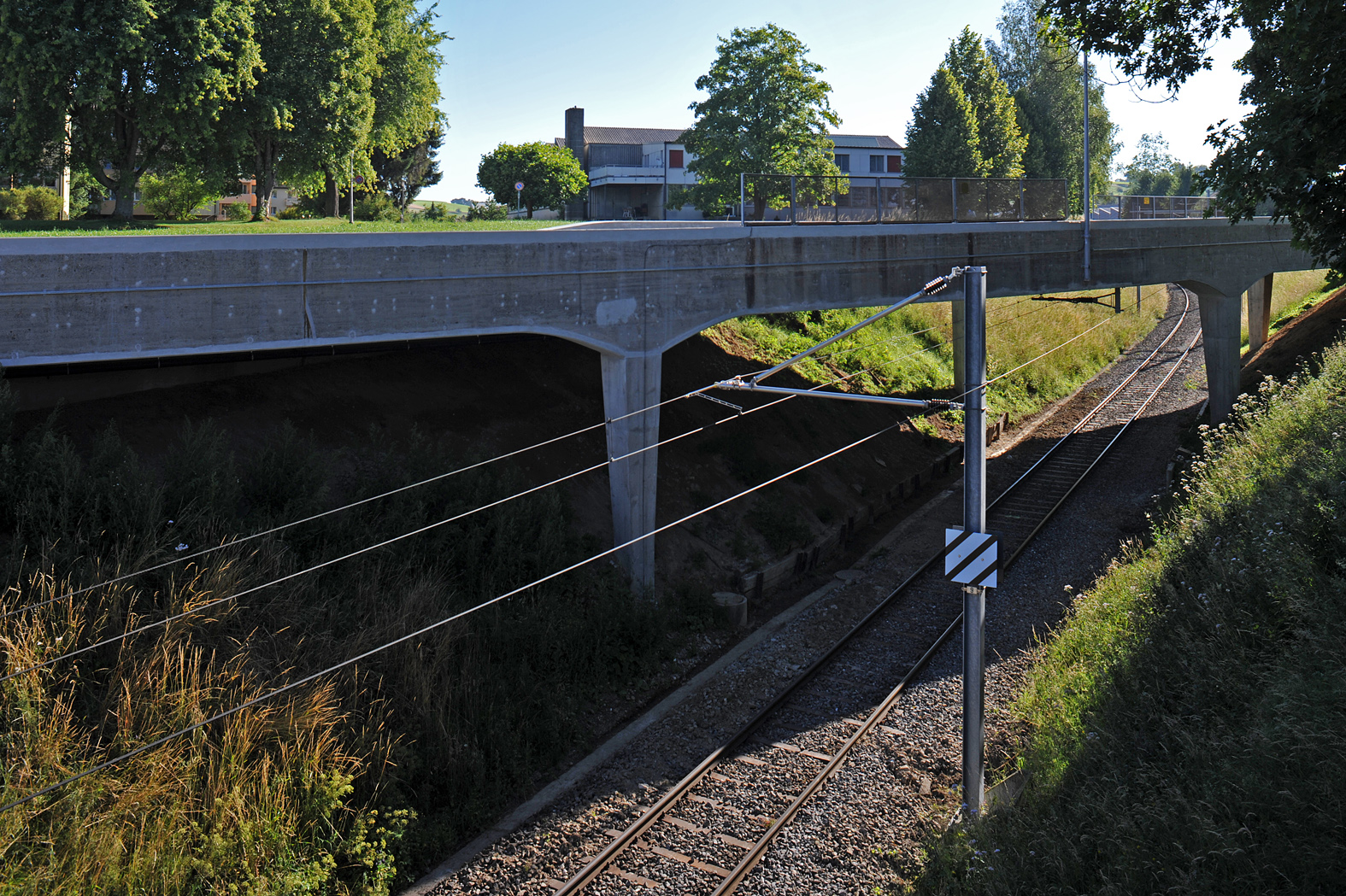
Luzernstrasse bridge and railroad in Huttwil. Its location on the Bern-Lucerne road helped Huttwil grow into a regional center.

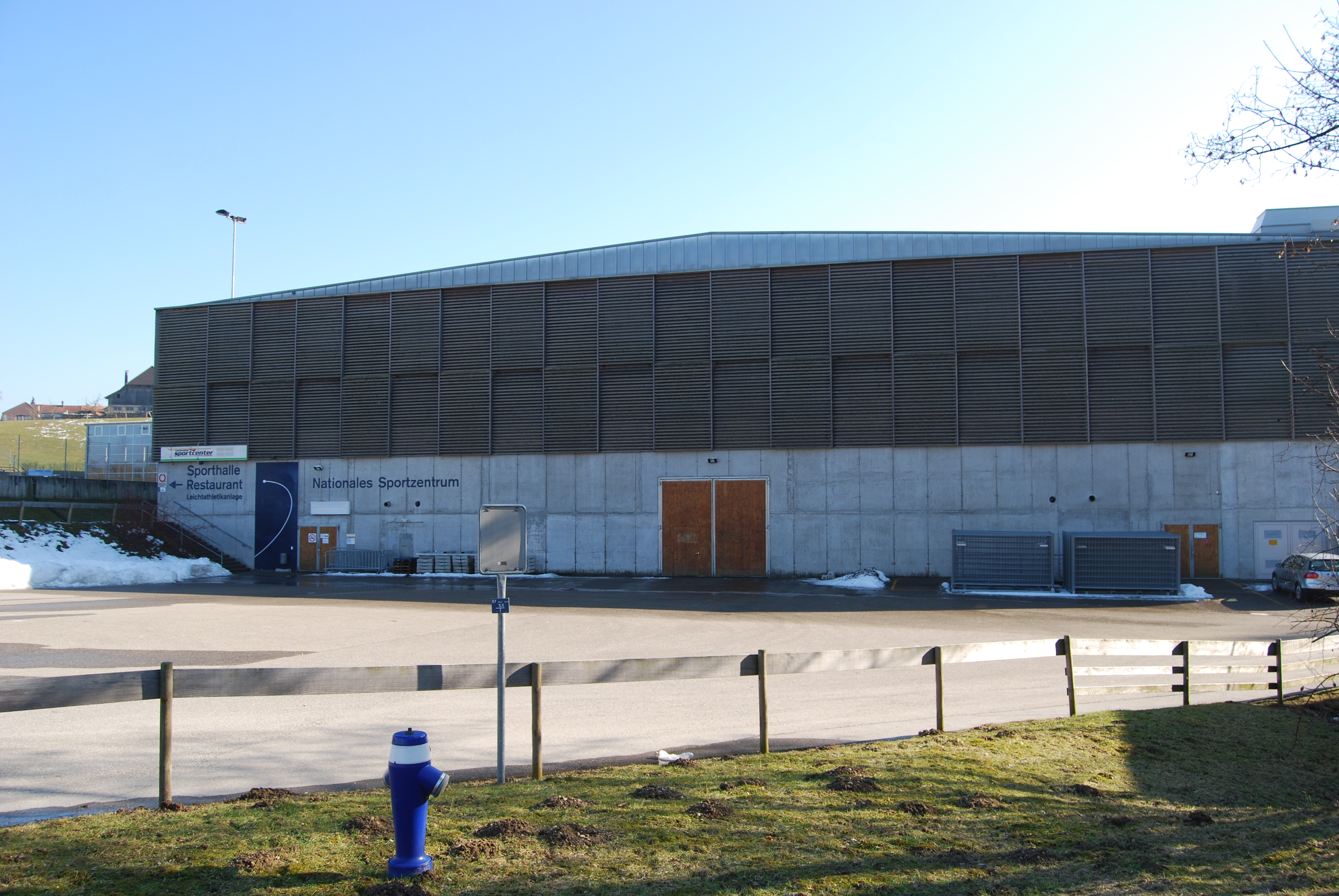
National Sport Center at Schwarzenbach in Huttwil

As of 2011, Huttwil had an unemployment rate of 1.81%. As of 2011, there were a total of 3,080 people employed in the municipality. Of these, there were 254 people employed in the primary economic sector and about 87 businesses involved in this sector. The secondary sector employs 1,192 people and there were 93 businesses in this sector. The tertiary sector employs 1,634 people, with 274 businesses in this sector. There were 2,399 residents of the municipality who were employed in some capacity, of which females made up 41.6% of the workforce.

In 2008 there were a total of 2,199 full-time equivalent jobs. The number of jobs in the primary sector was 171, all in agriculture. The number of jobs in the secondary sector was 854 of which 663 or (77.6%) were in manufacturing and 184 (21.5%) were in construction. The number of jobs in the tertiary sector was 1,174. In the tertiary sector; 432 or 36.8% were in wholesale or retail sales or the repair of motor vehicles, 136 or 11.6% were in the movement and storage of goods, 61 or 5.2% were in a hotel or restaurant, 48 or 4.1% were the insurance or financial industry, 62 or 5.3% were technical professionals or scientists, 100 or 8.5% were in education and 223 or 19.0% were in health care.

In 2000, there were 1,199 workers who commuted into the municipality and 938 workers who commuted away. The municipality is a net importer of workers, with about 1.3 workers entering the municipality for every one leaving. A total of 1,461 workers (54.9% of the 2,660 total workers in the municipality) both lived and worked in Huttwil. Of the working population, 9.7% used public transportation to get to work, and 47.2% used a private car.

In 2013 the average church, local and cantonal tax rate on a married resident, with two children, of Huttwil making 150,000 CHF was 11.6%, while an unmarried resident's rate was 17.8%. For comparison, the median rate for all municipalities in the entire canton was 11.7% and 18.1%, while the nationwide median was 10.6% and 17.4% respectively.

In 2011 there were a total of 1,842 tax payers in the municipality. Of that total, 449 made over 75,000 CHF per year. There were 11 people who made between 15,000 and 20,000 per year. The greatest number of workers, 481, made between 50,000 and 75,000 CHF per year. The average income of the over 75,000 CHF group in Huttwil was 118,044 CHF, while the average across all of Switzerland was 136,785 CHF.

In 2011 a total of 2.4% of the population received direct financial assistance from the government.

== Sights ==
The entire town of Huttwil is designated as part of the Inventory of Swiss Heritage Sites.

== Politics ==
In the 2011 federal election the most popular party was the Swiss People's Party (SVP) which received 35.7% of the vote. The next three most popular parties were the Conservative Democratic Party (BDP) (16.9%), the Social Democratic Party (SP) (13.5%) and the FDP.The Liberals (7.6%). In the federal election, a total of 1,695 votes were cast, and the voter turnout was 47.5%.

== Religion ==
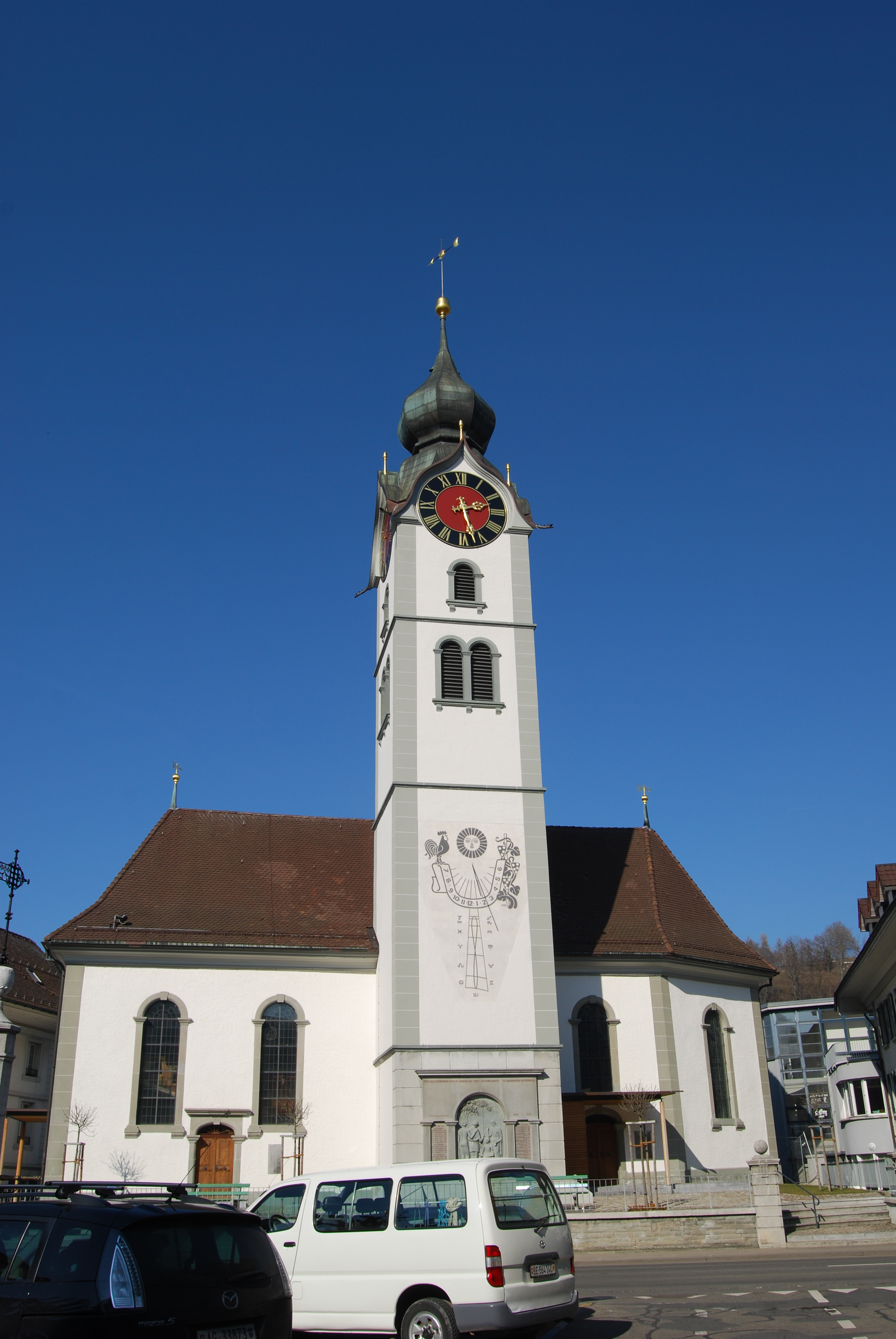
Reformed church of Huttwil

From the 2000 census, 3,447 or 71.4% belonged to the Swiss Reformed Church, while 629 or 13.0% were Roman Catholic. Of the rest of the population, there were 30 members of an Orthodox church (or about 0.62% of the population), there were 2 individuals (or about 0.04% of the population) who belonged to the Christian Catholic Church, and there were 188 individuals (or about 3.90% of the population) who belonged to another Christian church. There were 81 (or about 1.68% of the population) who were Muslim. There were 8 individuals who were Buddhist, 64 individuals who were Hindu and 8 individuals who belonged to another church. 187 (or about 3.88% of the population) belonged to no church, are agnostic or atheist, and 181 individuals (or about 3.75% of the population) did not answer the question.

== Climate ==
Between 1981 and 2010 Huttwil had an average of 139.9 days of rain or snow per year and on average received 1,276 mm (50.2 in) of precipitation. The wettest month was May during which time Huttwil received an average of 131 mm (5.2 in) of rain or snow. During this month there was precipitation for an average of 13.3 days. The driest month of the year was February with an average of 82 mm (3.2 in) of precipitation over 10.9 days.

== Education ==
In Huttwil about 57.1% of the population have completed non-mandatory upper secondary education, and 14.3% have completed additional higher education (either university or a Fachhochschule). Of the 405 who had completed some form of tertiary schooling listed in the census, 72.6% were Swiss men, 22.2% were Swiss women, 2.7% were non-Swiss men and 2.5% were non-Swiss women.

The Canton of Bern school system provides one year of non-obligatory Kindergarten, followed by six years of Primary school. This is followed by three years of obligatory lower Secondary school where the students are separated according to ability and aptitude. Following the lower Secondary students may attend additional schooling or they may enter an apprenticeship.

During the 2012–13 school year, there were a total of 638 students attending classes in Huttwil. There were a total of 88 students in the German language kindergarten classes in the municipality. Of the kindergarten students, 15.9% were permanent or temporary residents of Switzerland (not citizens) and 20.5% have a different mother language than the classroom language. The municipality's primary school had 276 students in German language classes. Of the primary students, 13.8% were permanent or temporary residents of Switzerland (not citizens) and 15.2% have a different mother language than the classroom language. During the same year, the lower secondary school had a total of 274 students. There were 8.4% who were permanent or temporary residents of Switzerland (not citizens) and 13.9% have a different mother language than the classroom language.

As of 2000, there were a total of 715 students attending any school in the municipality. Of those, 568 both lived and attended school in the municipality, while 147 students came from another municipality. During the same year, 119 residents attended schools outside the municipality.

Huttwil is home to the Bibliothek Huttwil library. The library has (as of 2008) 15,880 books or other media, and loaned out 64,451 items in the same year. It was open a total of 299 days with average of 17 hours per week during that year.

== Notable people ==
- Fritz Ryser (1873 in Huttwil – 1916) a Swiss cyclist. He won the UCI Motor-paced World Championships in 1908 and finished third in 1901
- Anja Nyffeler (born 1992 in Huttwil) a Swiss competitor in synchronized swimming who competed in the 2012 Summer Olympics
- Cyndi Lauper has ancestor from this area revealed in Finding Your Roots with Henry Louis Gates Jr.
