= Worringer =

Worringer is a surname. Notable people with this name include:

- Emmy Worringer (1878–1961), German artist; sister of Wilhelm
- Marta Worringer (1881–1965), German Expressionist artist; wife of Wilhelm
- Wilhelm Worringer (1881–1965), German art historian; brother of Emmy, husband of Marta

== See also ==
- Worringer Bruch, a place in Germany
