= Werner Neuhaus =

Swiss painter (1897–1934)

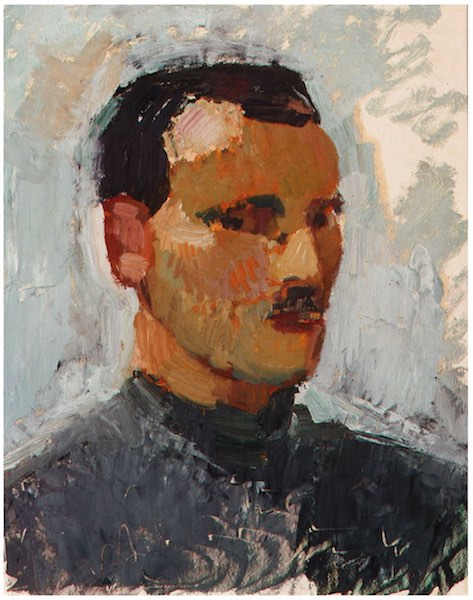
Self-portrait (1922)

Werner Neuhaus (1 November 1897, in Burgdorf – 22 August 1934, in Lützelflüh) was a Swiss painter, printmaker and draftsman. He was a founding member of the Swiss Expressionist Rot-Blau group.

== Biography ==
After serving an apprenticeship in lithography at the Wassermann Institute in Basel and working for a short period, Neuhaus audited art classes at the Gewerbeschule Basel. From 1921 to 1922, he studied and lived with Cuno Amiet in Oschwand. This likely influenced his decision to rent a studio in Binningen in 1923, so he could pursue his art work undisturbed. While in Binningen he became friends with Albert Müller, Paul Camenisch and Hermann Scherer. In 1924, Neuhaus joined Müller, Camenisch, and Scherer in organizing the Rot-Blau group. In 1925, Neuhaus, Scherer and Camenisch spent the summer working in Mendrisiotto.

In 1926, he married Hedwig (Hede) Gfeller (d. 1985), daughter of the author, Simon Gfeller, noted as the first person to write a novel in Bernese German. The following year, he and his wife retired from public life and moved to a rural area near Rüegsau in Emmental.

Later, they moved to an area near Lützelflüh called Grabenhalde, where her father lived. There he built a studio which was designed by the architect, Ernst Bützberger (1879-1935). After 1930, he changed to a style of painting that resembled the Academic realism of the 19th century. This change of style corresponded to trends in the tastes of local art collectors, affecting his ability to sell work. Sales of portraits, landscapes and still-lifes increased dramatically. During this period, he was awarded a Federal Arts Fellowship and received third prize at the Concours Calame (named after the landscape painter, Alexandre Calame).

On 20 August 1934, he was riding home on his bicycle with designs for the glass windows at St. Blasius Church when he was struck by an automobile. He died from his injuries two days later. The designs were completed in 1935 by Leo Steck.

== Selected paintings ==
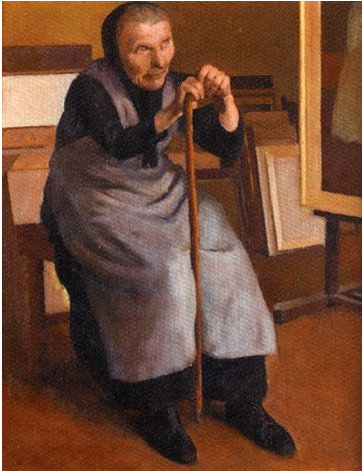
The Blind Woman

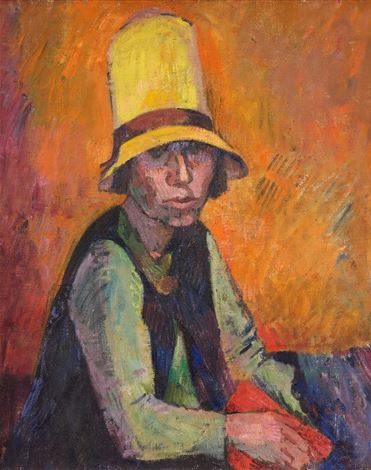
Woman in a Yellow Hat

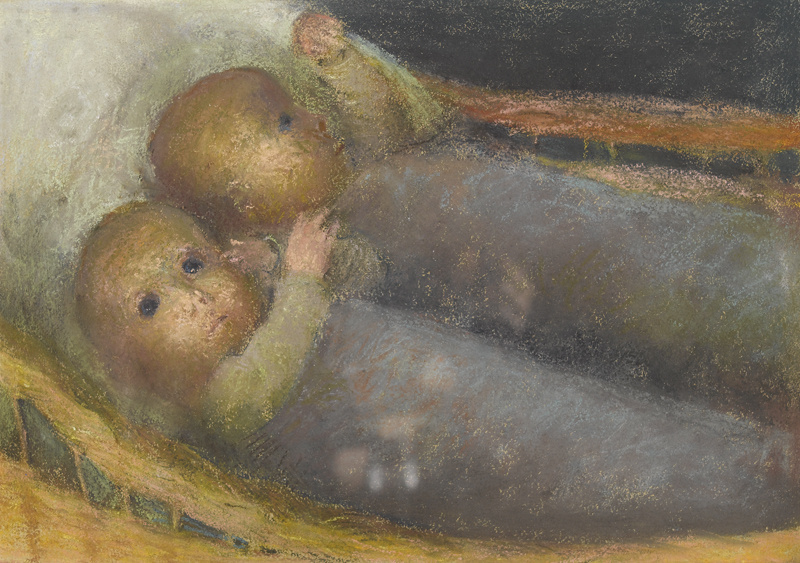
Twins

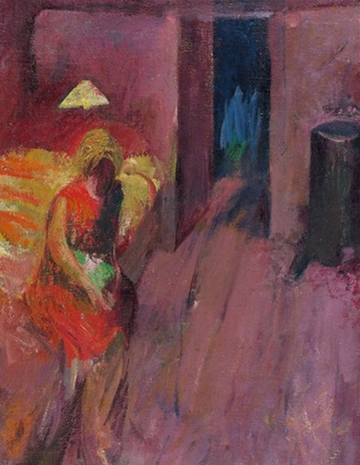
Red Room with
Sitting Woman

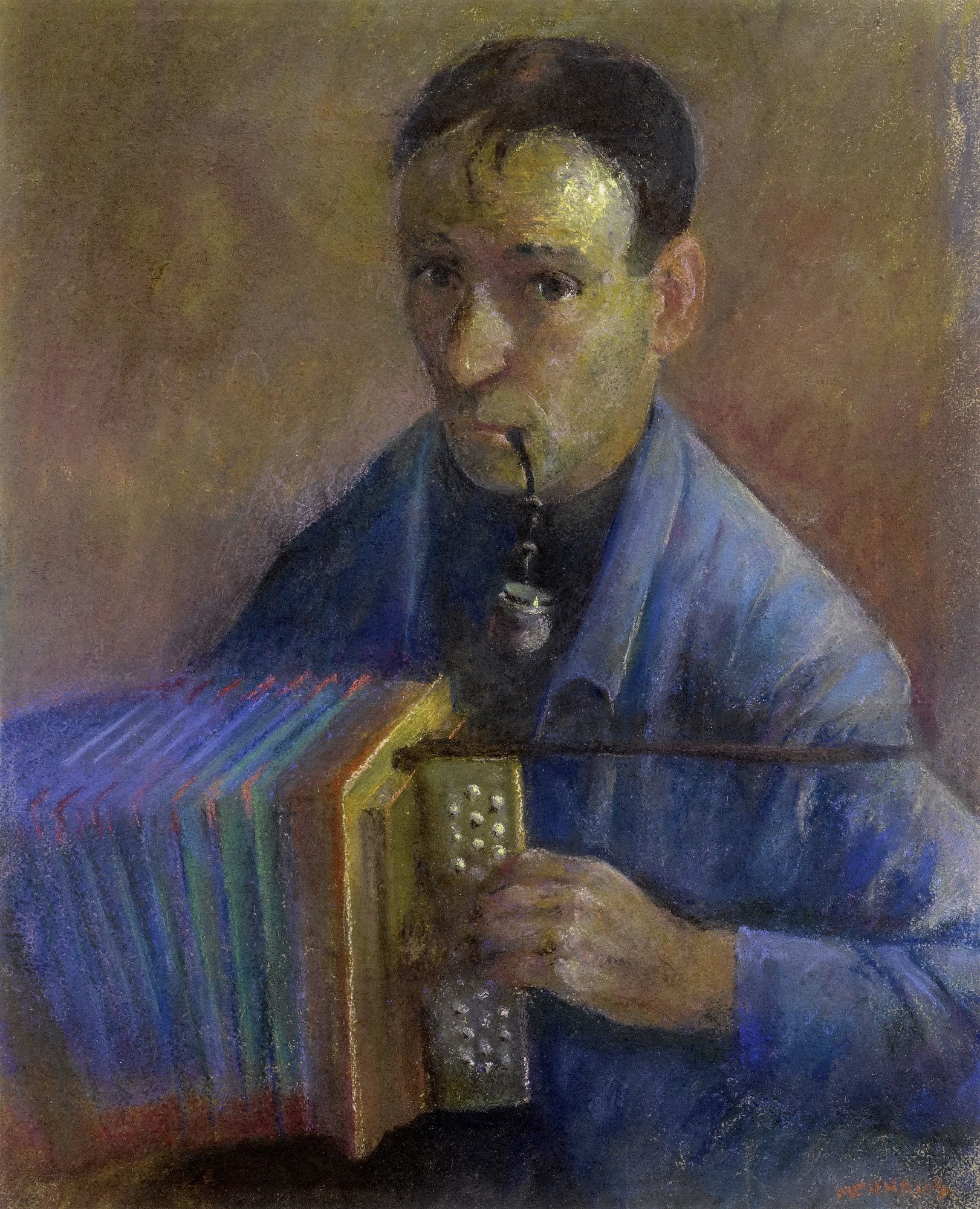
Self-portrait with Accordion

== Exhibition catalogs ==
- Anna Schafroth, Werner Neuhaus – Maler zweier Welten, Fischer-Media-Verlag, Münsingen-Bern 1997
- Werner Neuhaus. Bündner Kunstmuseum, Chur 1984
- Werner Neuhaus: Die Holzschnitte der „Rot-Blau“-Zeit 1924/27. Kunstmuseum Basel, Basel 1979 ISBN 978-3-7204-0003-9
- Willi Raeber: Gedächtnisausstellung Werner Neuhaus. 31. März bis 28. April 1935. Kunsthalle Bern, Bern 1935
