= Hermann Scherer =

Swiss Expressionist painter and sculptor

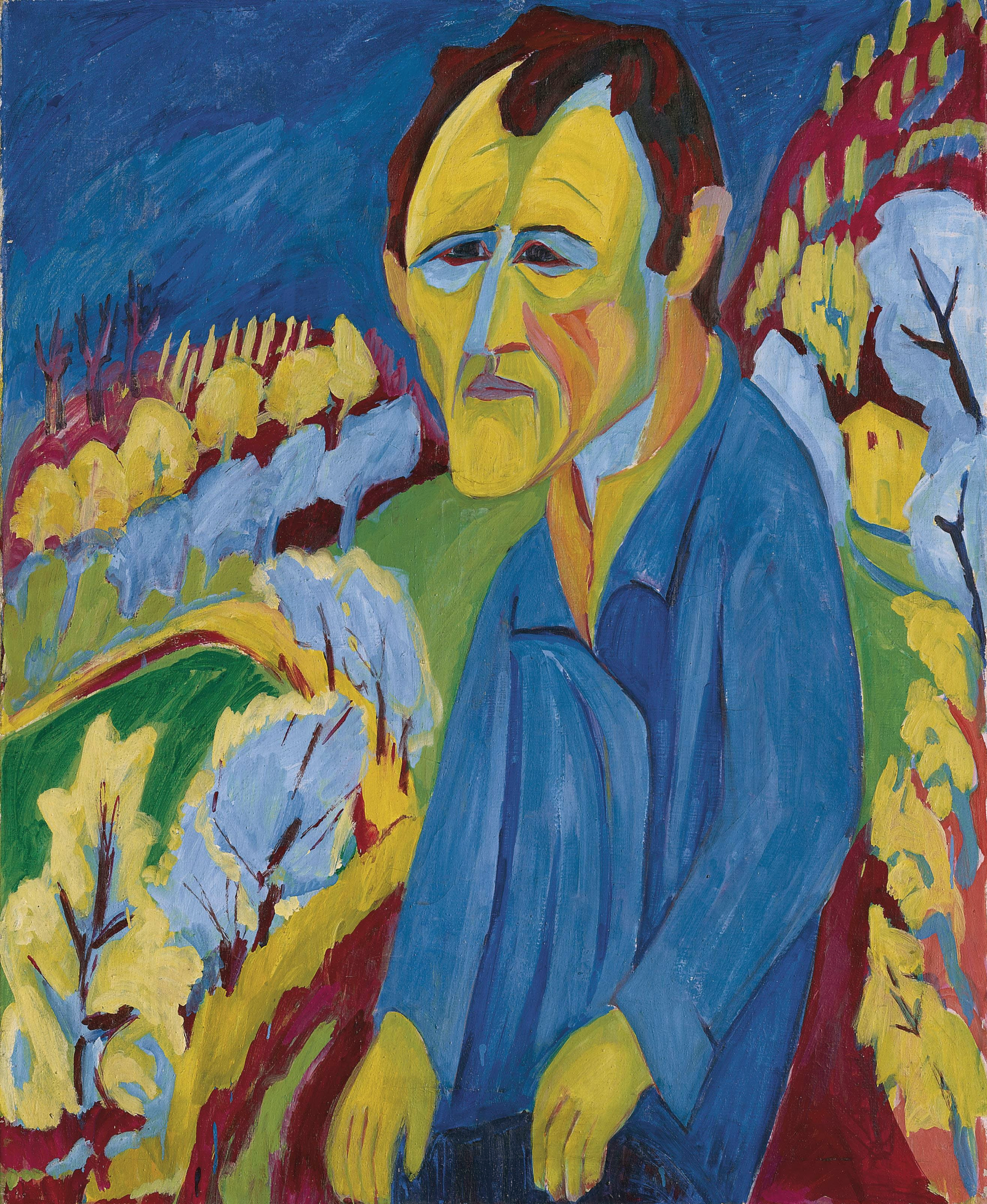
- Born: 8 February 1893; Rümmingen, Germany
- Died: 13 May 1927 (aged 34); Basel, Switzerland
- Known for: Painting/Sculpture

Hermann Scherer (8 February 1893– 13 May 1927) was a German-speaking Swiss Expressionist painter and sculptor.

== Life ==
Hermann Scherer was born in Rümmingen, Baden-Württemberg in 1893. After leaving school in 1907, Scherer began an apprenticeship as a stonemason at the Schwab workshop in Lörrach. From 1910 to 1919 he worked as a stonemason with a series of Basel sculptors: Carl Gutknecht, Otto Roos and Carl Burckhardt. By working as a labourer and later assistant for Roos, he was able to pay for a small workshop. In 1919, Scherer took a new contemporary approach to art (and painting), and destroyed many of the works he had previously made. From 1921 to 1922 he was influenced by the work of the German painters Erich Heckel, Ernst Ludwig Kirchner and Karl Schmidt-Rottluff.

In the early 1920s he visited an Edvard Munch exhibition at the Kunsthaus Zürich and met Kirchner, whom he would later visit for several long painting trips in Davos from 1923 to 1924. In June 1923, the Kunsthalle Basel held a first representative exhibit of Kirchners work in Switzerland. In August, he visited Kirchner in Davos-Frauenkrich. In 1924 he finally had the opportunity to take part in an exhibition of new German art in Stuttgart with three of his wood sculptors. Eventually, Scherer founded the artist group Rot-Blau with Albert Müller and Paul Camenisch in late 1924, later joined by Werner Neuhaus.

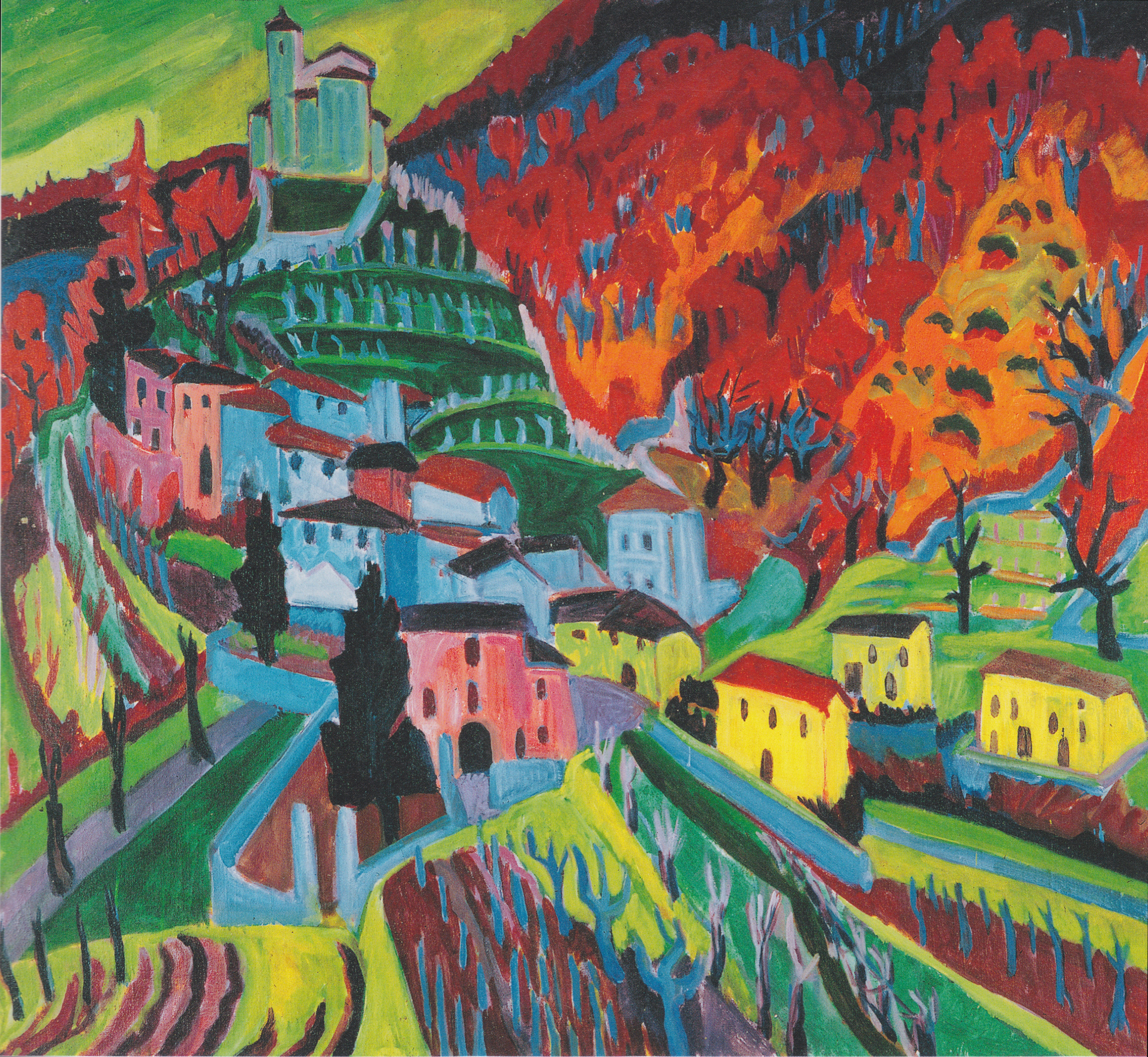
Mendrisiotto with Church of Obino, 1926

The group received a strong public reaction when they debuted their work at an exhibition at the Basler Kunstverein in 1925. At this time Müller had already left the group, who had already also exhibited at the Kunsthaus Zürich (1925). Individual works were rejected as offensive in both Basel and Zürich.

Although Kirchner and Scherer had fallen out in 1925, they remained connected by their love for Expressionism and Kirchner promoted the Rot-Blau group at the International Art Exhibition in Dresden in 1926.

Scherer became seriously ill in autumn 1926 and died in Basel 13 May 1927. The artist was commemorated that year by an exhibition at the Kunsthalle Basel, which displayed over 200 of his works. The Dreiländermuseum in Lörrach holds 118 of Scherer’s works, including many woodcuts and the "Portrait of Otto Staiger".

== Legacy ==
A street and bridge in Rümmingen are named after Scherer. In 2004 the Pfalzgalerie Kaiserslautern acquired the sculpture "Das kleine Mädchen" ("The little girl") from a Swiss art gallery for over 140,000 Euros.

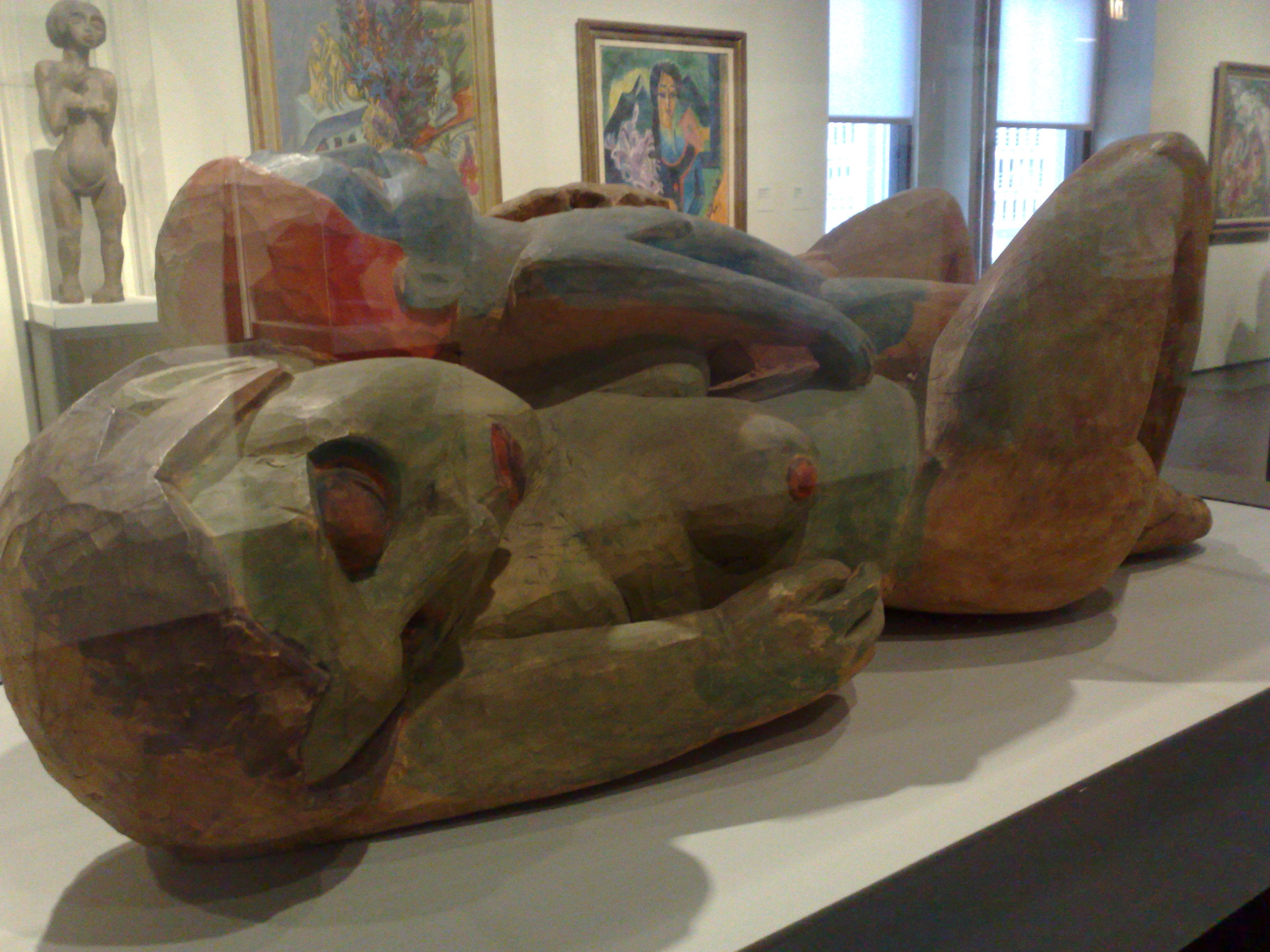
Sleeping Woman With Boy, 1926

== Exhibitions ==
- 1926 Zürich, Ausstellung Rot Blau Kunsthaus Zürich
- 1927 Dresden, Internationale Kunstausstellung
- ·1994 Davos, Hermann Scherer, Galerie Iris Wazzau
- ·1995 Wichtrach/Bern Hermann Scherer Galerie Henze & Ketterer
- 2007-2008 Bern, Kunstmuseum, Groningen, Groninger Museum, Chur, Bündner Kunstmuseum Expressionismus aus den Bergen - Kirchner, Bauknecht, Wiegers und die Gruppe Rot Blau
- 2012-2013 Davos, Ernst Ludwig Kirchner und Hermann Scherer. Eine Gegenüberstellung Galerie Iris Wazzau
