= Walter Loosli =

Walter Robert Loosli (29 July 1932 – 29 November 2015) was a Swiss sculptor, woodcut engraver and maker of painted stained glass panels and windows.

Loosli was born in La Chaux-d'Abel, a part of Sonvilier in the canton of Bern, Switzerland. He trained first as a primary school teacher and therapist in Bern, but went on to further training in the School of Art (Kunstgewerbeschule) in Bern. He learned drawing with Hans Schwarzenbach and Max von Mühlenen. He also studied sculpture with Salvatore Meli in Rome.

Since 1972 Loosli has worked as an independent artist. His principal activity is the fitting-out and decoration of rooms, particularly churches.

Loosli has lived since 1954 in the village of Köniz, where he also has a gallery.

== Exhibitions ==
- 1991 Galerie Heubühne Oberdiessbach: sculptures and woodcuts
- 1992 Könizer Galerie: murals and stained or painted glass windows
- 1995 Postmuseum Prag: graphics and drawings
- 2001 Könizer Galerie: new glass
- 2005 Kirchgemeindehaus Johannes Bern: glass, woodcuts, sculptures
- 2006 Eglise du Pasquart Bienne: stained or painted glass windows

== Selected works ==
- 1973 District Prison, Bern: ceramic wall decoration in the foyer (233 x 287 cm)
- 1991/92 Catholic Church, Interlaken: Feuer und Wasser, Himmel und Erde (Fire and water, Heaven and Earth) – two windows in the nave (700 x 360 cm each); Himmlisches Jerusalem und Weltenrad (Heavenly Jerusalem and World Wheel) – two clerestory windows (390 x 105 and 390 x 420 cm); Pfingstwunder (Whitsun Miracle) – group of windows over the main entrance (150 x 180 cm) and two flanking windows (154 x 61 cm each); Maria im Strahlenkranz (Mary in Radiance) and Drei Lilien (Three Lilies) – four windows in the side chapel (152 x 61 cm each)
- 1997/99 Rüegsau Church: Karfreitag, Ostern, Pfingsten (Good Friday, Easter, Whitsun) – three windows in the choir (middle window 360 x 120 cm; two side windows 175 x 108 cm each); Die sieben Schöpfungstage (The Seven Days of Creation) – seven windows in the nave (87 x 108 cm each)
- 2004 "Talita kum – Mädchen steh auf!" (Talitha kum – girl, arise!) woodcuts by Walter Loosli, texts by Klara Butting and Gerard Minnaard (Verlag Erev-Rav)
- 1999/2011 stained glass windows in Kappelen Church

== Literature ==
- Walter Loosli, Stefan Trümpler, Heinz Zwahlen, Fred Zaugg: Glasfenster und Wandgestaltung. Stämpfli Verlag: Bern ISBN 978-3727210808
