= Albert Müller =

Swiss artist (1897–1926)

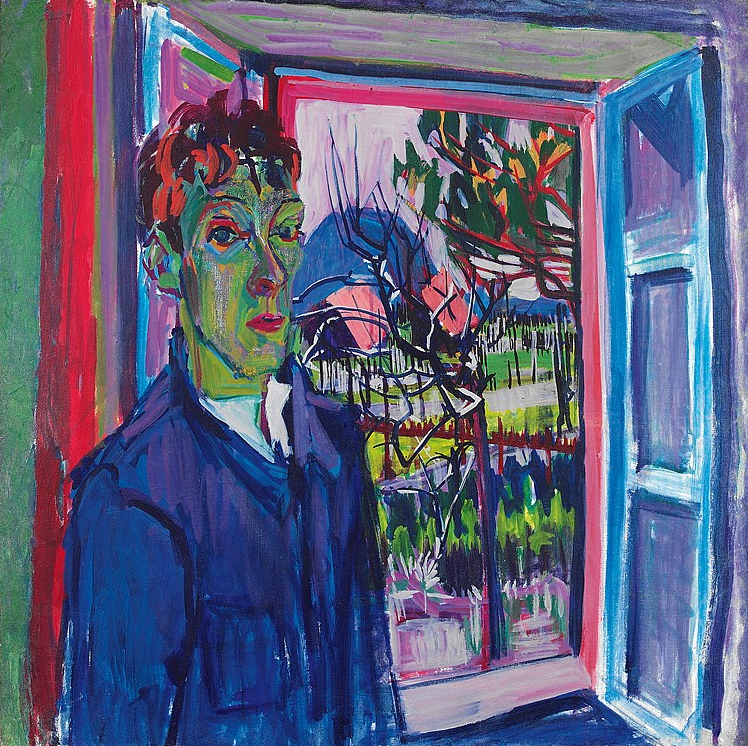
- Born: 29 November 1897; Basel, Switzerland
- Died: 14 December 1926 (aged 29)
- Movement: Expressionism

Albert Müller (29 November 1897 Basel, Switzerland - 14 December 1926) was a Swiss Expressionist painter, glass artist, draftsman, graphic artist and sculptor.

== Early life and education ==
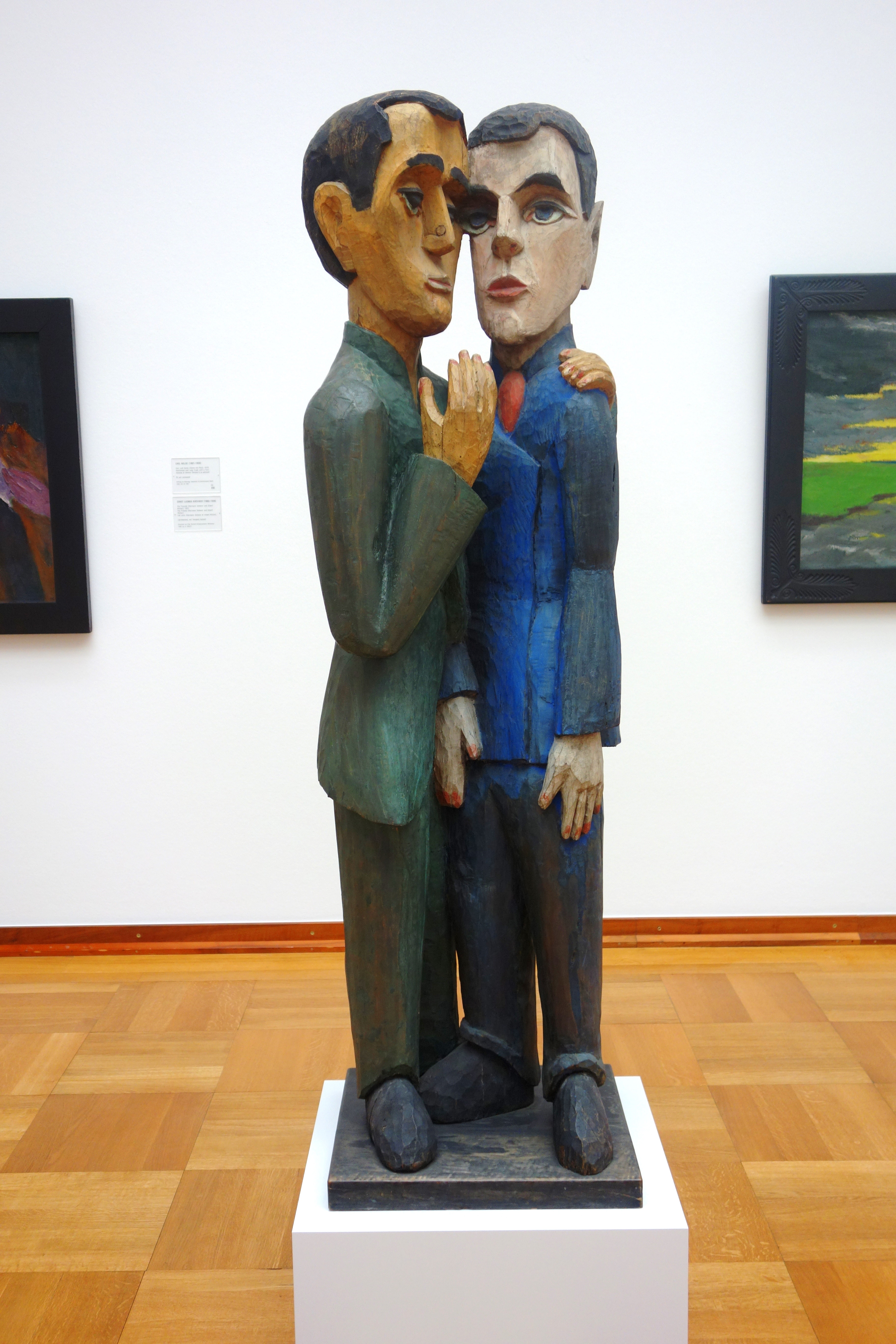
Sculpture The Friends (Hermann Scherer and Albert Müller) by Ernst Kirchner

Müller was born in Basel on the 29 November 1897 to the gardener Emil Müller and his wife Anna Barbara Angelika Meyer. His parents married in 1887 and he had four siblings. They lived on the St.Alban Ring which at the time lay still in the periphery of the city of Basel. Between 1904 and 1908 he attended the primary school in the school Sevogel nearby. His grades were good for singing, but he did not excel in writing and drawing. In 1908 he entered high school Zur Mücke where he was an average student. In the third year he was put on probation. He excelled in singing and drawing and after graduation in 1912 he decided to become an artist, but his father did not agree. Only after he compelled teachers at the school of crafts to talk to his parents and suggested their son could become a glass painter, his father agreed. Until 1913, the year he entered the school of crafts, he worked in the family business. In 1917, he graduated as a glass painter from the general business school in Basel. In 1917, he graduated from the apprenticeship as a glass painter at the workshop of Eichin & Straub in Basel. He trained together with Otto Staiger, who commented that they created numerous stained glasses of Emperor Heinrich and the Basel Staff. From 1913 onwards he studied for 10 semesters at the school of crafts in Basel and graduated in the winter semester 1917/1918. Following he would travel to Munich, and Paris together with his future wife Anna Hübscher and her brother. In France, he was impressed by the stained glass windows of the Chartres Cathedral. His father then saw it appropriate that Albert Müller followed up on his studies with Cuno Amiet, with who he stayed for some time in the Oschwand between Langenthal and Burgdorf. Amiet's house became a meeting point for several artists at the time, such as Ferdinand Hodler, Hermann Hesse or Marianne von Werefkin. It is assumed he returned before the end of 1918.

== Professional career ==
In 1920, he applied for a federal art grant and received 1000 Swiss Francs. Another state art grant awarded him 2000 Swiss francs. He used the money for a journey to Italy. In Italy he was inspired by the works of the Trecento and Quattrocento. Later he installed himself in San Gimignano together with Niklaus Stoecklin. With Stoecklin he toured through Ravenna, Siena, Assisi or Perugia. In September 1920 he returned to Basel. In 1921, he settled to Colderio in the Ticino. In October 1922, he came under the influence of Edvard Munch, from who he saw his paintings in the Kunsthalle Basel, an experience that would influence his relationship with Carl Burckhardt who was not impressed by the German expressionism. In 1923, he was invited to take part in an exhibition on Basel and it s environment in the Kunsthalle Basel. In 1924 his design for the stained glass windows of the Gewerbeschule in Basel was elected.

In 1923, Müller became acquainted with the expressionist Ernst Ludwig Kirchner. The Kunsthalle Basel held the first representative exhibit of Kirchners works of Switzerland in June 1923, which would influence Müllers and his friend Hermann Scherers works in the future. In October 1924, Otto Staiger Hermann Scherer and Albert Müller exhibited some water color paintings in the store windows of a book shop in the hope to break the exclusion from the exhibitions of the Kunsthalle. The exhibit drew quite some attention from the critics and was also described the art magazine Der Cicerone. Müller then invited Hermann Scherer to Obino for Christmas and New Year's Eve in the winter of 1924–1925. And in the night of New Year's Eve, Albert Müller, Hermann Scherer and Paul Camenisch founded the artist group Rot-Blau in Obino. Later, also Werner Neuhaus would be a part of the group. The young painters were not yet as successful, and usually lost against the older artist generation in the competitions. In the years between 1924 and 1926, he was a frequent guest with Ernst Ludwig Kirchner in Davos Frauenkrich. Between the families of Kirchner and Müller a friendship developed and of Kirchner six paintings portraying members of the Müller family are known and a wooden sculpture of Albert Müller with Hermann Scherer are known.

== Death and legacy ==
In 1926, Müller died suddenly after contracting Typhus. Ludwig Kirchner strongly supported Müllers widow and children, organized a memorial exhibit for Albert Müller in Basel and also designed the poster for it. Following the trustees for the children Kaspar and Judith deposited all of Albert Müllers works in the Fine Art Museum of Basel and following the death of Judith in 1977, the paintings were transferred to Kaspar.

== Family ==
In Italy, he became engaged with an unknown woman from Florence, but he then did not marry her. His wife Anna Hübscher died as early as 1927. After Anna and Albert got engaged, Anna had already planned to study in the Swanley Horticultural College. In March 1923, the twin children Kaspar and Judith were born in Lugano. In November 1923 the family settled to Obino, a village in the Muggio valley.

== Gallery ==
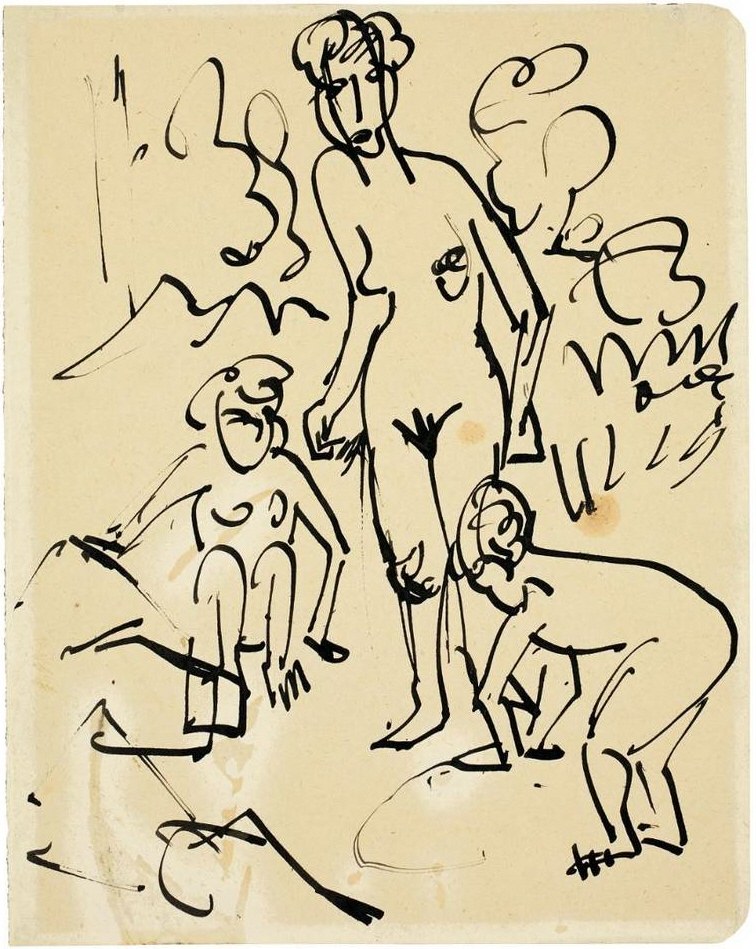
Anna Müller and the twin Judith and Kaspar, 1925

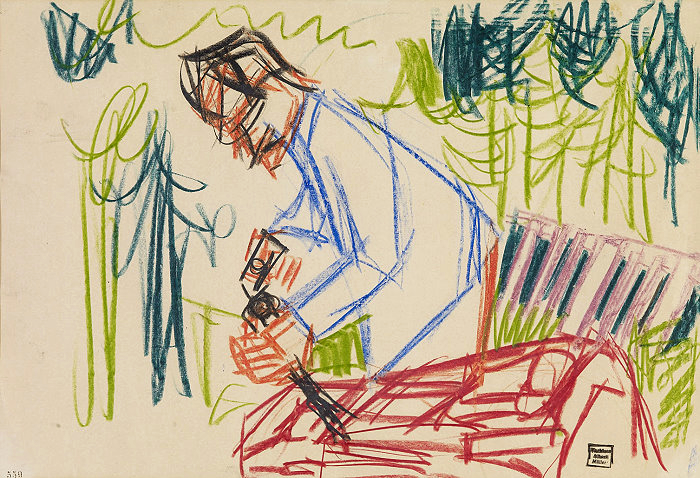
Sculptor

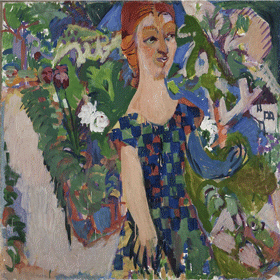
Mädchen im Garten, 1926

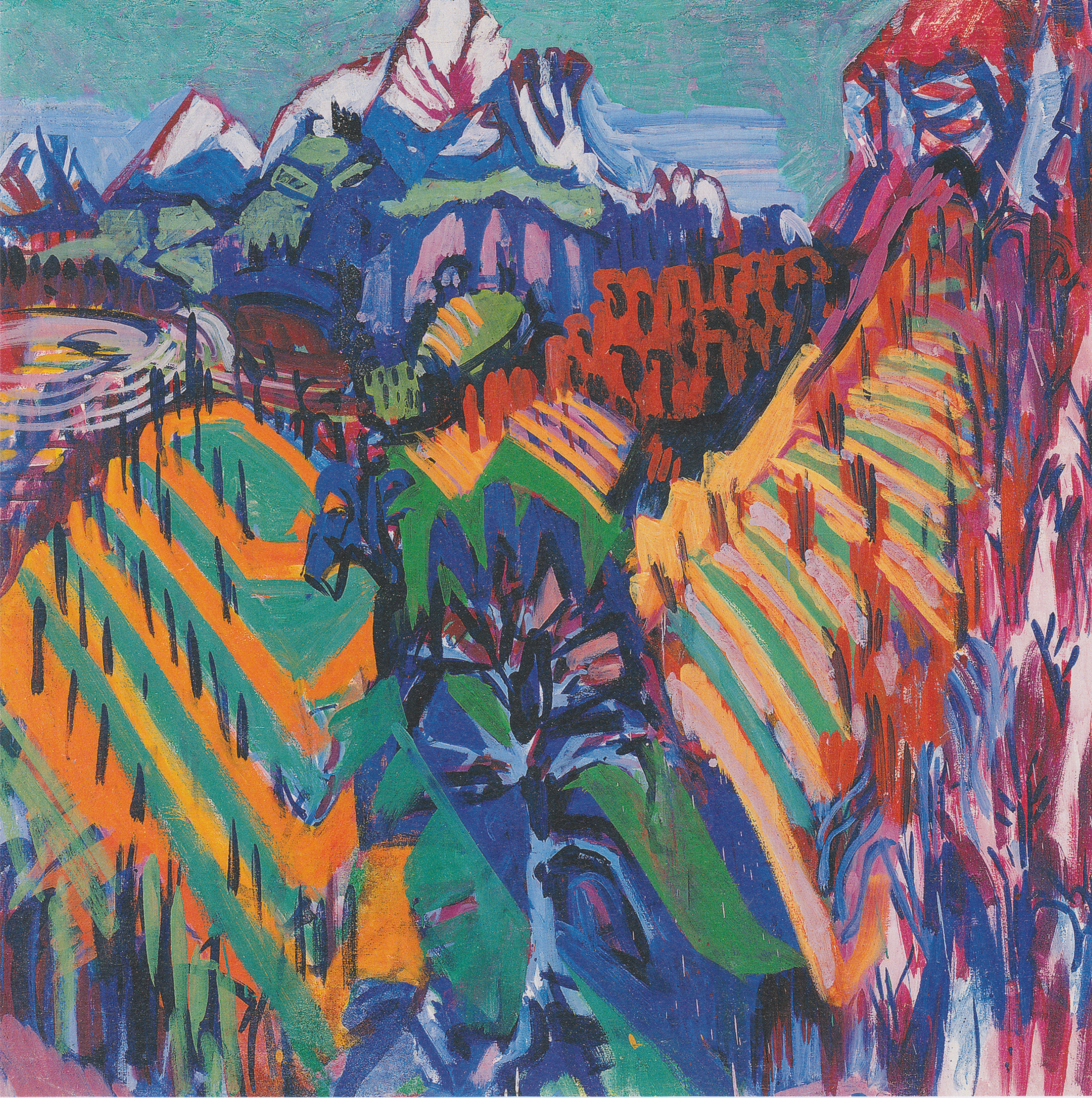
Rebberge im Tessin, 1925

== Bibliography ==
- Kornfeld, Marlies; Müller, Albert (1988). Albert Müller: das graphische Werk (in German). Verlag Galerie Kornfeld. ISBN 9783857730207.
- Stutzer, Beat (1981). Albert Müller (1897-1926) und die Basler Künstlergruppe Rot-Blau: mit einem kritischen Katalog der Gemälde, Glasscheiben und Skulpturen (in German). F. Reinhardt. ISBN 9783724504832.
