= Rüegsau Priory =

Swiss nunnery

Coordinates: 47°01′29″N 7°40′28″E

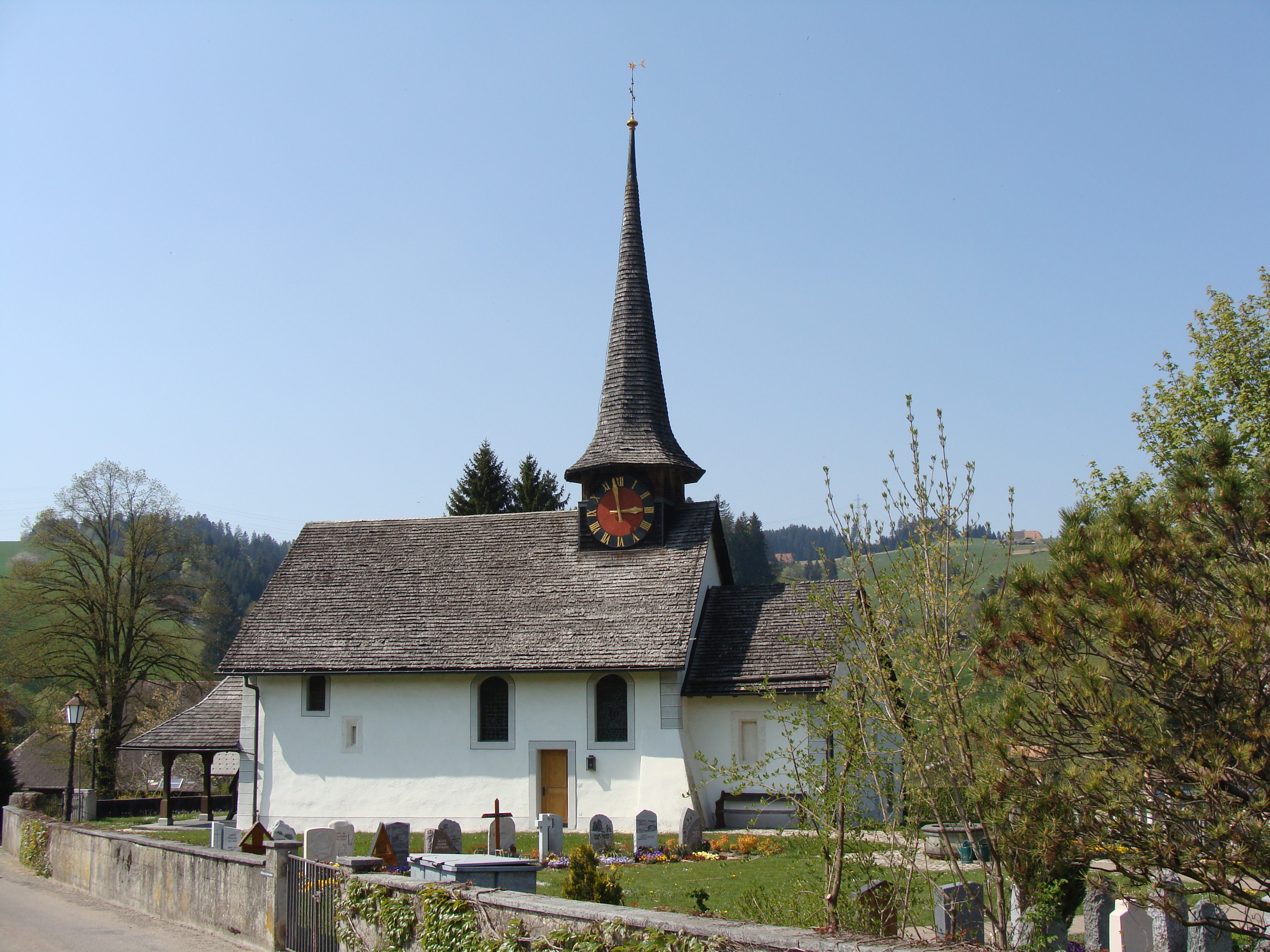
The former priory church, now the village church

Rüegsau Priory (possibly Rüegsau Abbey towards the end of its existence) (German: Kloster Rüegsau) was a 12th-century Swiss monastery of Benedictine nuns in Rüegsau, in the Canton of Bern. It was dissolved in 1528 as a result of the Reformation in Switzerland.

== History ==
The origins of the community are unrecorded, but it is presumed to have been founded by Thüring of Lützelflüh, the founder of Trub Abbey, in the first half of the 12th century. A provost or prior is recorded for the first time in 1256. From the 13th century the names of the female heads of house, or Meisterinnen, are recorded (with gaps). Between 1508 and 1516, an abbess (Margareta von Freiberg) is recorded. The nunnery was governed spiritually by the abbot of Trub. The priory acquired a number of scattered estates, which by around 1500 amounted to some hundred farms and other properties.

In 1495 the conventual buildings burnt down, but were rebuilt thanks to the generosity and favour of the authorities of Bern. At the same time the priory bell was presented which now hangs in the church of Rüegsau.

The priory was dissolved in 1528 during the Reformation. Its goods were used to provide income for the priests of Rüegsau and Lützelflüh, and part of the buildings was used to provide a priest's house. The remaining buildings were gradually dismantled: the last traces of the walls were removed between 1825 and 1831.

The priory church became the village church. It was renovated in 1789–1790 and extended in 1874. Further renovations took place in 1947, 1990 and 1999. The church contains some notable stained glass windows by the contemporary artist Walter Loosli.

A small permanent exhibition on the nunnery's history can be seen in the parish house of Rüegsauschachen, displaying finds from excavations in 1964, 1965–1968 and 1978–1979 (for example, colour-glazed oven tiles, shards of pottery, tools and the fragments of a reliquary box). The excavations also unearthed a statue of the Virgin Mary from the time of the nunnery, of which a copy stands in the hall next to the church.

The priory owned the still-extant chapel of Saint Blaise in the neighbouring hamlet of Rüegsbach, which has the oldest church bells in Switzerland (12th and 13th centuries).
