= Werner Miller =

Swiss painter (1892–1959)

Werner Miller (1892–1959) was a Swiss painter.

== Life ==
Miller's father, Oscar, was a paper manufacturer and an art collector. Werner Miller studied with Ferdinand Hodler and Cuno Amiet. One of his works is the Gstaad tourism advertisement in the main lobby of the Basel SBB railway station. Miller lived in Biberist.
