= Gereonsklub =

Artist collective

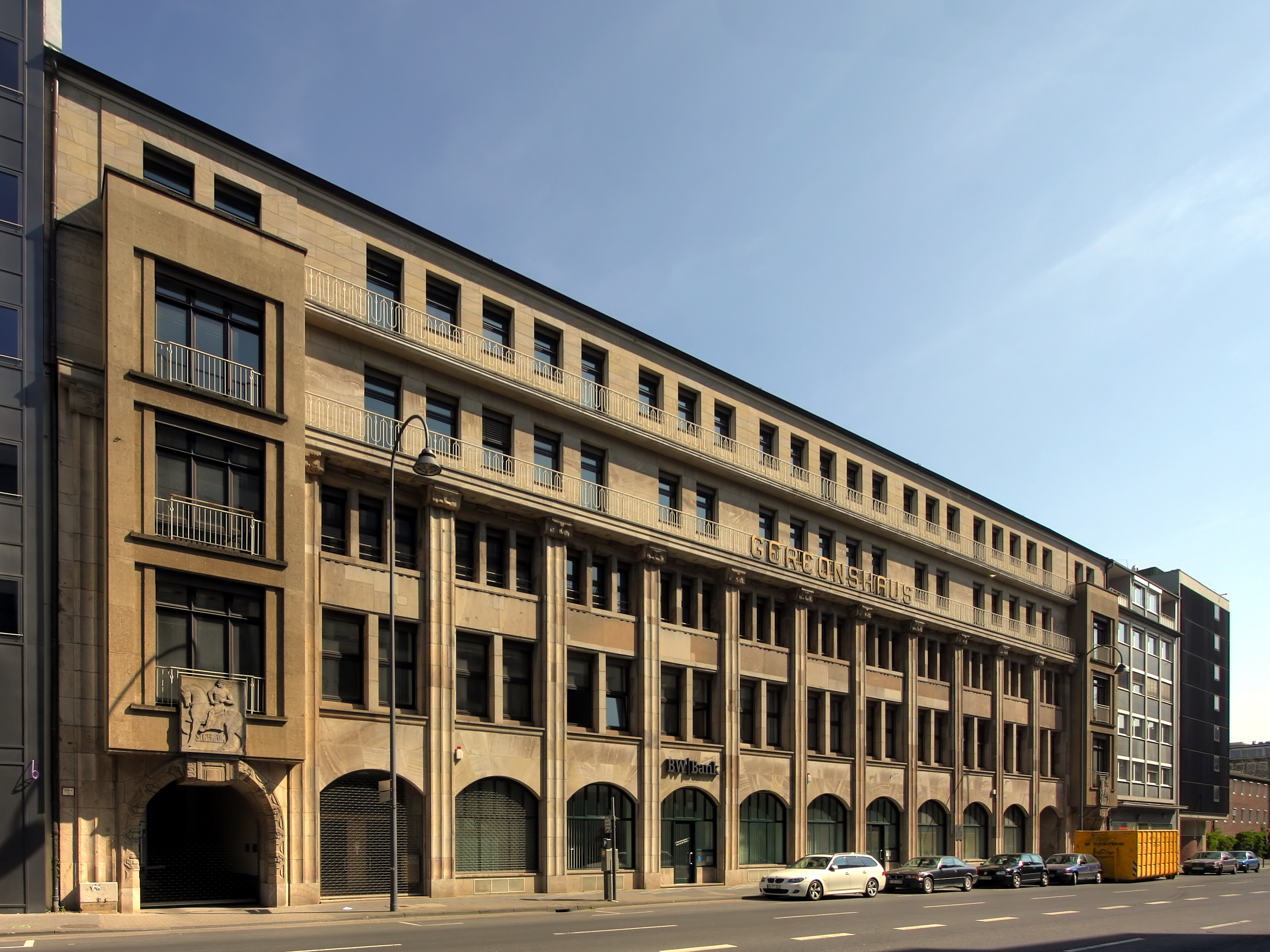
The Gereonshaus in Cologne, designed by Carl Moritz, 1909–10; home of the Gereonsklub.

The Gereonsklub was an avant-garde artists' association in Cologne in the years immediately prior to World War I.

Its founding members were the artists Olga Oppenheimer, Emmy Worringer, and Franz M. Jansen. Later members included Marta Worringer and August Macke. Named for the Gereonshaus building designed by the architect Carl Moritz, in which Oppenheimer had a studio, it opened in January 1911 and closed in 1913.

The Gereonsklub operated as a center for lectures and exhibitions and had a painting school run by Oppenheimer. Emmy Worringer and her brother Wilhelm, an art historian, booked the lectures and organized the exhibitions. In its short history, it exhibited such notable artists as Franz Marc (1911), Paul Klee (1912), Robert Delaunay (1913), and August Macke. In 1912, the Gereonsklub was the first stop for an early touring exhibition of the Blue Rider group.
