= Marta Worringer =

German painter

- Born: January 16, 1881
- Died: October 12, 1965 (aged 84)
- Known for: Painting
- Style: German Expressionism

Marta Worringer (January 16, 1881 – October 27, 1965) was a German Expressionist artist known for her haunting images of women.

== Life ==
She was born Marta Maria Emilie Schmitz in Cologne, to attorney Emil Schmitz and Elise (Esser) Schmitz. She later described her childhood as oppressive.

She studied art privately in Düsseldorf with Willy Spatz because women were not then allowed to enroll in German art schools. She also studied in the women's wing of the Munich Art Association and later with the artist Cuno Amiet in Switzerland. When she returned to Cologne, she moved into a residential community with the artists Emmy Worringer and Olga Oppenheimer. In 1907, she married Emmy's brother, the art historian Wilhelm Worringer; they had three daughters whose care fell largely to Marta.

Marta and Wilhelm moved several times as Wilhelm shifted from one university job to another. They lived successively in Bern (1909–1914), Bonn (1914–1927), Königsberg (1928–44), Berlin (1944–46), and Halle on the Saale (1946–50). In 1950, they moved to Munich, where they both died in 1965.

== Artwork ==
In the early 1900s, Worringer became associated with the Cologne Secession and was a member of the avant-garde Gereonsklub. In 1910, she exhibited at the Bern Art Museum, and the following year she exhibited at the Paris Salon.

After World War I, she turned towards the movement known as Das Junge Rheinland (The Young Rhinelanders), which rejected academicism in art. During the 1920s, she took part in exhibitions throughout Germany, and from the late 1920s until 1941, she showed her work regularly at the Königsberg Art Association. During the years of the Weimar Republic, she was so successful that she was able to financially support her family.

Worringer worked primarily in the mediums of drawing and printmaking and became known for her austere drawings of anonymous women suffering from grief and fear. Her work was frequently compared to that of Käthe Kollwitz for their shared interest in depicting anguished women, but her style is considerably more stylized than Kollwitz's. She also sold some embroidery designs and illustrated some books, including an edition of Heinrich Kleist's story The Marquise of O. In her late 40s, she took up painting large oils, but hardly any of these survived.

Worringer had to leave behind almost her entire oeuvre in the wartime move from Königsberg to Berlin in 1944. Some 175 of her works are known to have survived, many from the postwar period. In 1993-94, a retrospective of her work was held in Bonn at the August-Macke-Haus.
