= Olga Oppenheimer =

German painter (1886–1941)

Olga Oppenheimer (9 July 1886 – 11 February 1941) was a German Expressionist artist.

== Education ==
Oppenheimer trained under Paul Sérusier in Paris in 1909. Thereafter, she trained in private studios in Munich and Dachau. Oppenheimer's father encouraged her pursuit of art and provided her with a studio, which was called the Gereonshaus, in his office building.

== Career ==
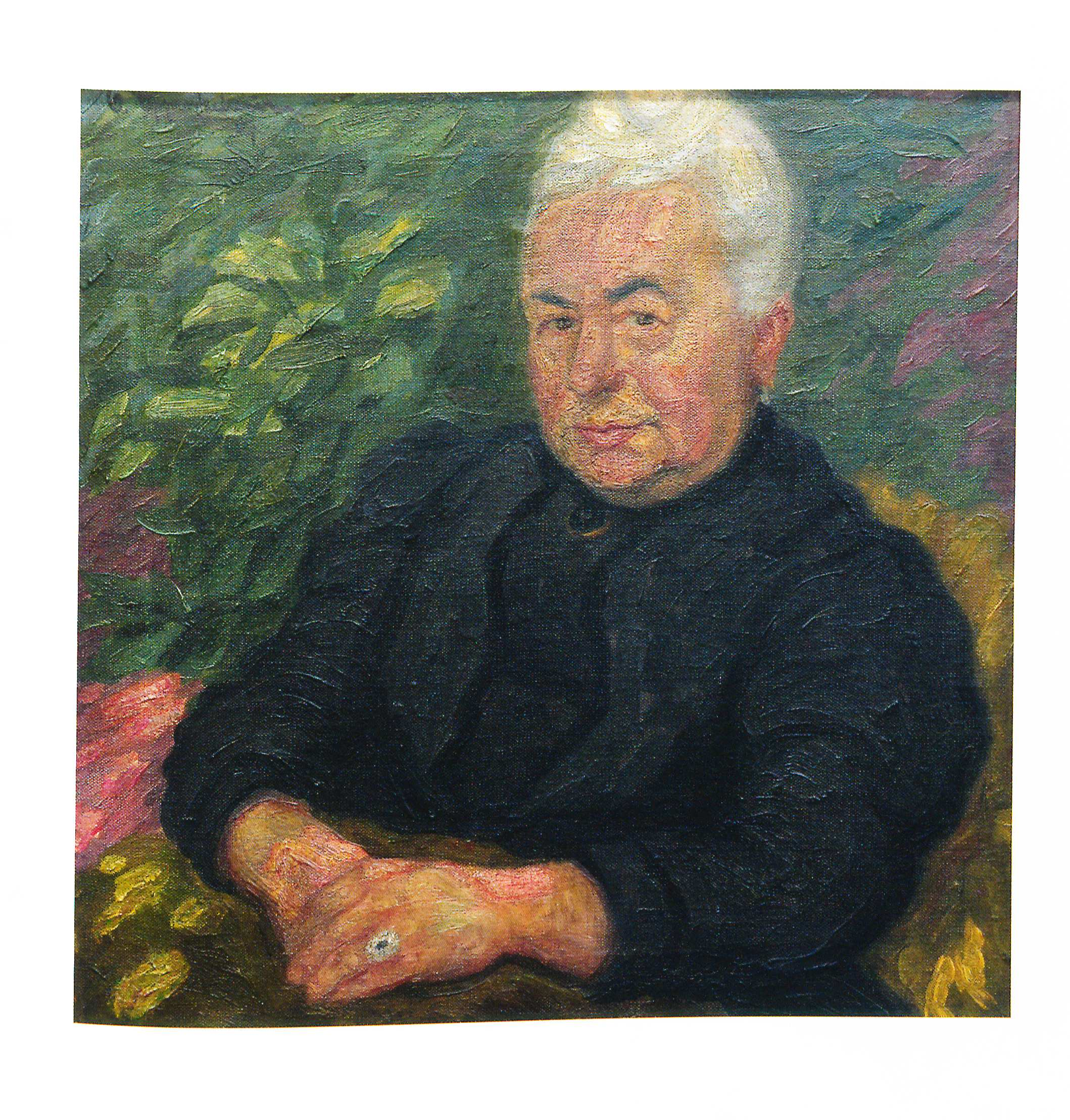
Bildnis Bertha Oppenheim (1907)

Oppenheimer was a co-founder of the Gereonsklub, an art school and major venue for modern art in Cologne, Germany, in 1911. The Gereonsklub became a center of contemporary avant-garde art in the Rhineland, presenting Der Blaue Reiter, Franz Marc, Paul Klee, Robert Delaunay and others for the first time in Cologne. Oppenheimer's artistic career was brief, spanning the years 1907 to 1916. Only ten of her works survive, five of which are illustrations.

Oppenheimer's work was exhibited in the International Sonderbund in Cologne in 1912 along with the work of two other women artists, Marie Laurencin and Paula Modersohn-Becker. The next year, in 1913, she participated in an exhibition of Rhenish Expressionists at Walter Cohen's Bookstore, put together by August Macke, an influential Expressionist painter himself.

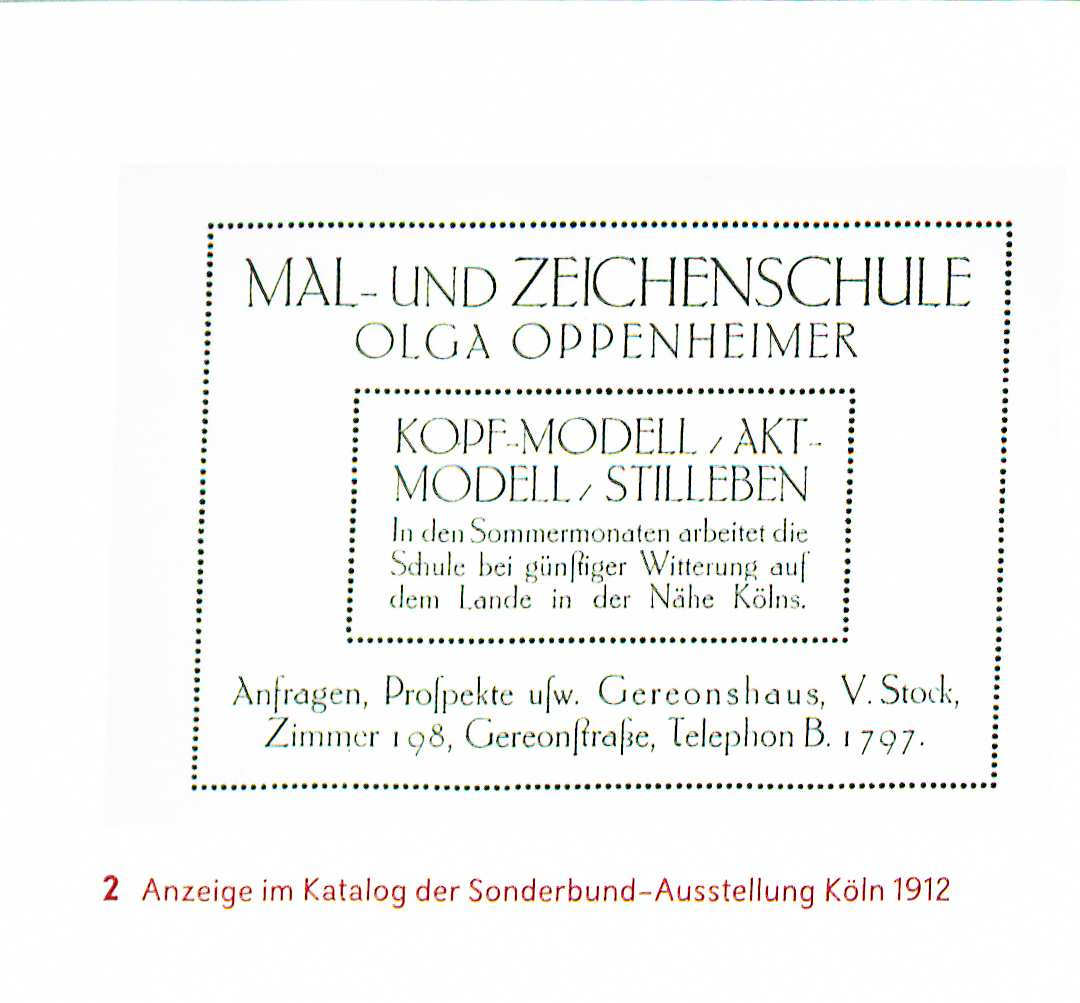
Advertisement for Oppenheimer's art school (1912)

Oppenheimer was the only female German artist who participated in the Armory Show, which opened in New York City in 1913 and traveled to Boston and Chicago. She contributed a series of six woodcuts entitled Van Zanten's Happy Time, which was displayed in the same gallery as prints by Edvard Munch. After 1916, her health began to decline, and she was committed to a sanatorium in 1918.

Her career was interrupted by severe depression. In 1918, she entered the Waldbreitbach Sanatorium, a psychiatric institution where she spent twenty years of her life.

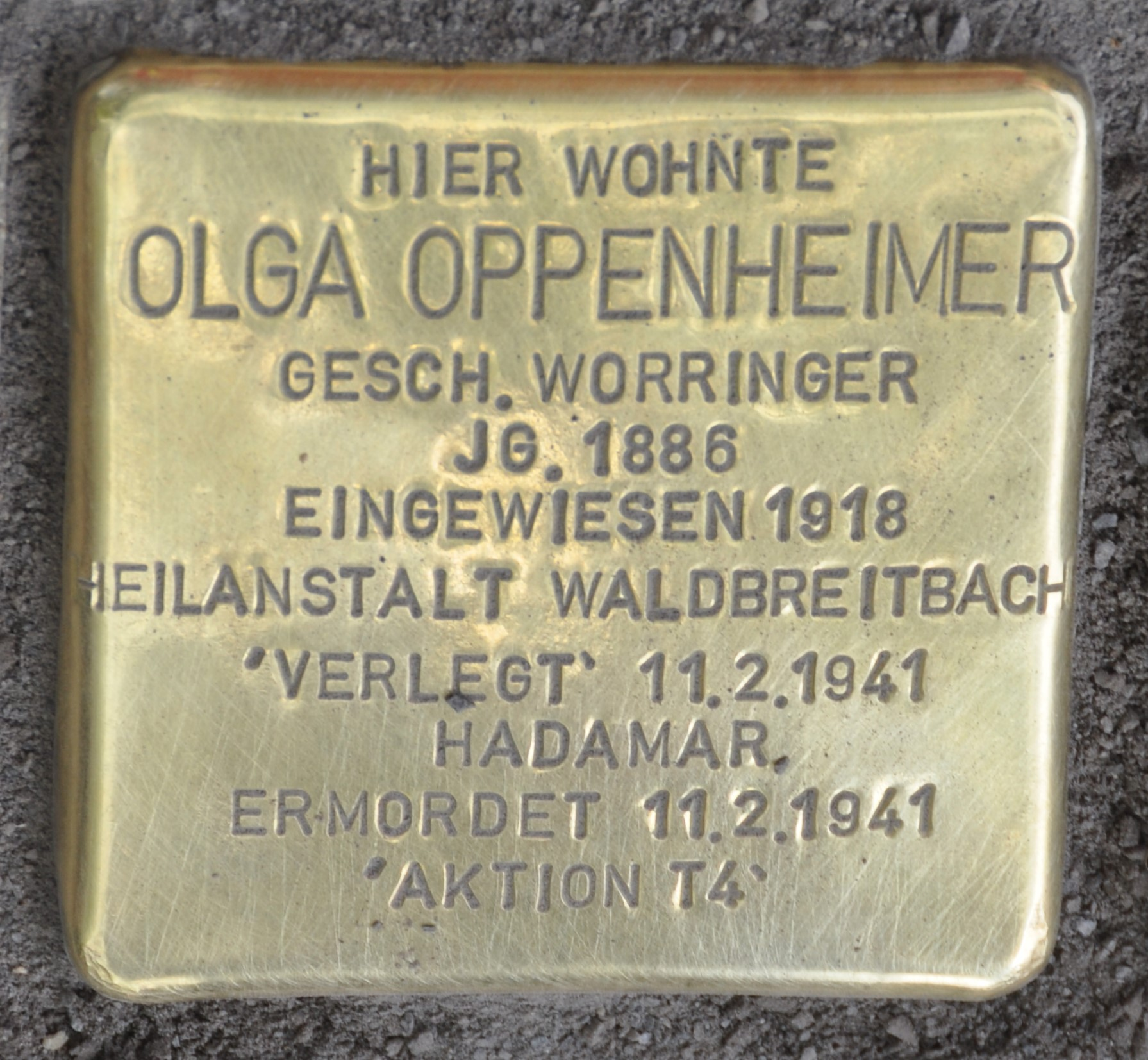
Stolperstein for Olga Oppenheimer

In 1941, according to the official death certificate, she died allegedly of Typhus in Cholm. This was intended to conceal the fact that Olga Oppenheimer had been deported from Waldbreitbach via Andernach to the Hadamar killing centre as part of the Nazi involuntary euthanasia programme known as Aktion T4, where she was murdered on 11 February 1941.

== Personal life ==
In 1913, Oppenheimer married Adolf Worringer, the brother of her friend Emmy Worringer. They had two sons and later divorced.
