= Emmy Worringer =

German artist (1878–1961)

Emmy Worringer (1878–1961) was a German artist and cofounder of the Gereonsklub, an avant-garde artists' association in Cologne in the years immediately preceding World War I.

Worringer studied art in Dachau as well as at the Academy in Munich; her fellow students included the expressionist painter Olga Oppenheimer (later her sister-in-law) and the modernist painter Adolf Hölzl. She later shared a studio in Cologne with Oppenheimer, and it was in Cologne that they, along with Franz M. Jansen, cofounded the Gereonsklub, an avant-garde artists’ association, in 1911. Worringer and her brother Wilhelm, an art historian, booked lecture programs and organized exhibitions for the group until it disbanded in 1913. During its short existence, the Gereonsklub exhibited such important artists as Franz Marc, Paul Klee, August Macke, and Robert Delaunay, as well as one of the first exhibitions of the Blue Rider group.

== See also ==
- Marta Worringer
