= Rüegsau =

- Municipality
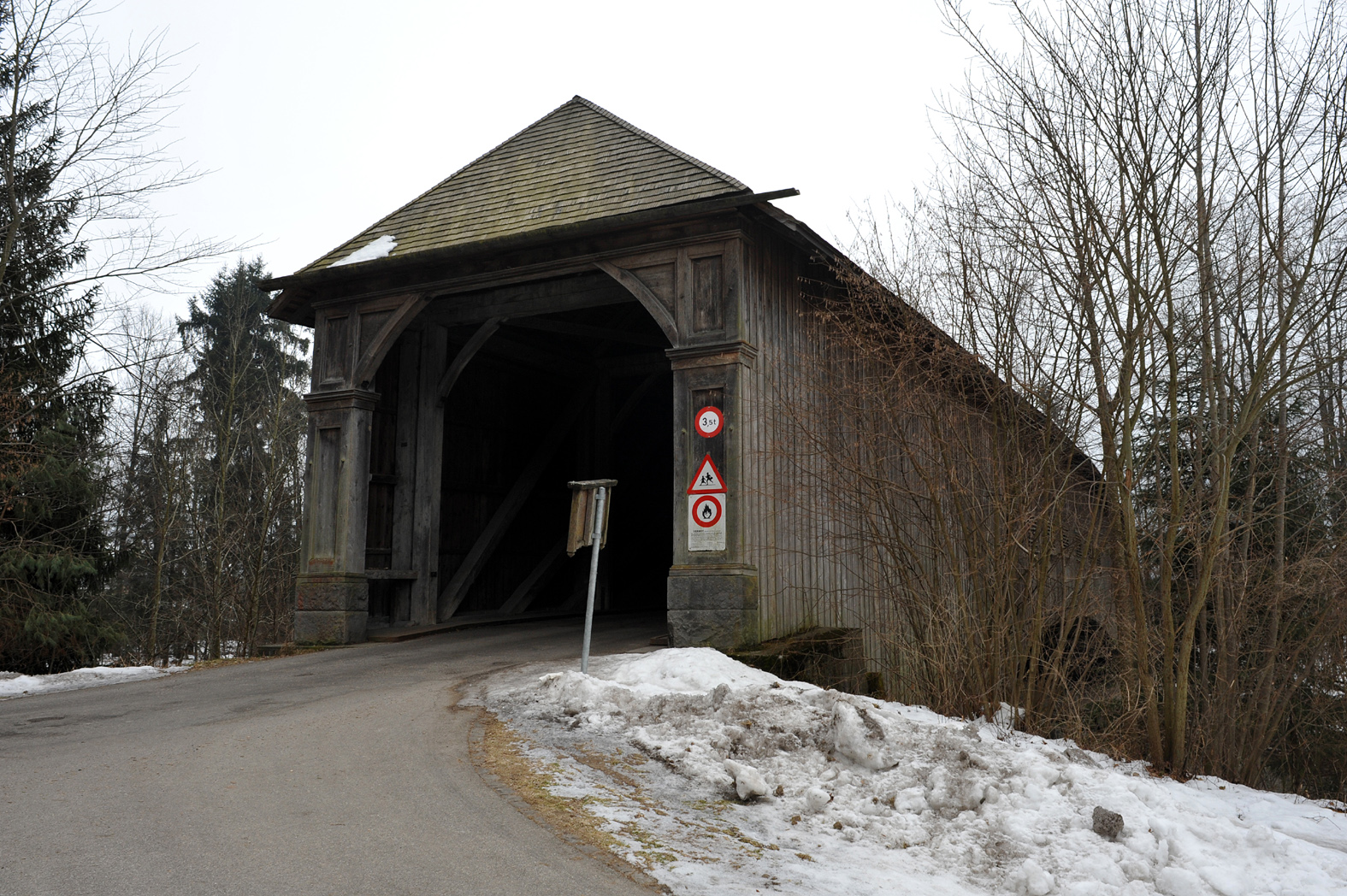
- Covered wood bridge of Hasle-Rüegsau.

- Flag Coat of arms
- Location of Rüegsau
- Location within Switzerland Location within Canton of Bern
- Coordinates: 47°1′N 7°41′E
- Country: Switzerland
- Canton: Bern
- District: Emmental

Government
  - Executive: Gemeinderat with 7 members
  - Mayor: Gemeindepräsident(in); Andreas Hängärtner (as of 2026)

Area
  - Total: 15.1 km^{2} (5.8 sq mi)
- Elevation: 589 m (1,932 ft)

Population (December 2020)
  - Total: 3,265
  - Density: 216/km^{2} (560/sq mi)
- Time zone: UTC+01:00 (CET)
  - Summer (DST): UTC+02:00 (CEST)
- Postal code: 3417
- SFOS number: 956
- ISO 3166 code: CH-BE
- Surrounded by: Affoltern im Emmental, Hasle bei Burgdorf, Heimiswil, Lützelflüh, Sumiswald
- Website: www.ruegsau.ch

Rüegsau is a municipality in the administrative district of Emmental in the Swiss canton of Bern.

== History ==
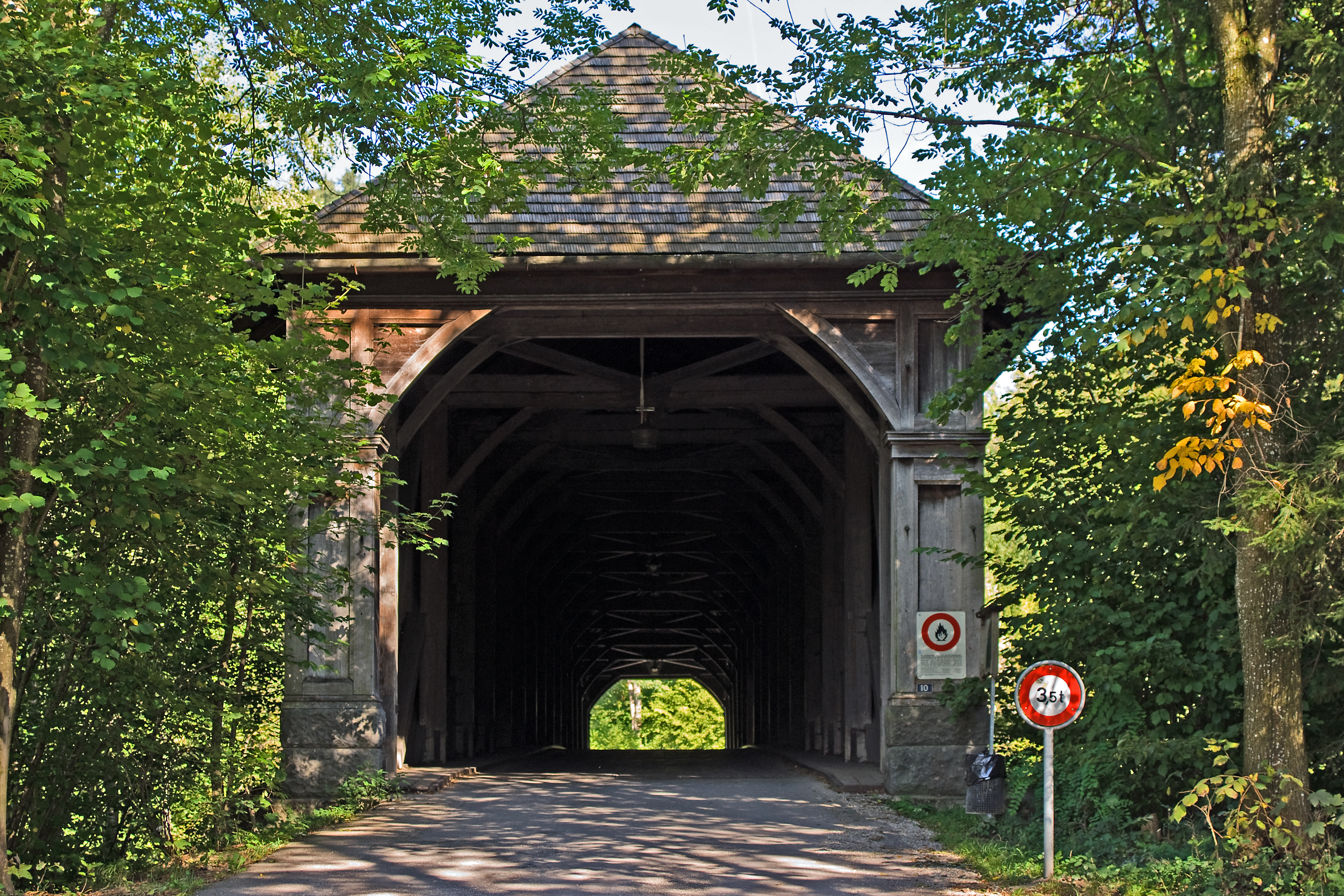
Wooden bridge at Rüegsau

Rüegsau is first mentioned in 1139 as Ruxow. In 1229 it was mentioned as Ruchisowe. The name comes from ruggere aue, in modern German ruhe Aue, meaning calm floodplain. From the late 13th century until 1528 it was the location of Rüegsau Priory, a Benedictine nunnery.

The oldest trace of a settlement is a Neolithic artifact discovered in Rüegsau village. The first trace of a modern settlement is in the first half of the 12th century when Rüegsau Abbey was probably founded. While very little is known about the early history of the abbey, it was probably founded by Thüring von Lützelflüh around the same time that he founded Trub Abbey. It is unknown whether the village grew up around the abbey or was already here when the abbey was founded.

The first known provost appears in the abbey in 1256–99. There was a Meisterin over the nuns in 1320 and an abbess is first mentioned in 1526–28. The abbey ruled over a section of the lower Emmental including Rüegsau and Affoltern im Emmental. In 1454 it had its own seal. In 1528 the city of Bern adopted the new faith of the Protestant Reformation and in the same year secularized all monasteries including Rüegsau Abbey. Its goods were used to provide income for the priests of Rüegsau and Lützelflüh, and part of the buildings was used to provide a priest's house. The remaining buildings were gradually dismantled: the last traces of the walls were removed between 1825 and 1831.

The priory church became the village church. It was renovated in 1789–1790 and extended in 1874. Further renovations took place in 1947, 1990 and 1999.

In 1763 a wooden, covered bridge was built over the Emme river connecting Hasle bei Burgdorf and Rüegsau. In 1881 the Burgdorf-Langnau railroad built a station in Hasle-Rüegsau. The railroad combined with the expansion of the Emmental road in 1899, brought factories to the formerly rural village. Today the services sector has surpassed industry, but agriculture and manufacturing are still an important part of the local economy.

== Geography ==
Aerial view by Rüegsauschachen from 300 m by Walter Mittelholzer (1922)

Rüegsau is located in the lower Emmental. It borders the Emme and then stretches north-east-ward. It contains the villages of Rüegsauschachen, Rüegsau, Rüegsbach and Rinderbach and several hamlets. The municipality has the approximate shape of a rectangle with a width of 2 kilometers (1.2 mi) and a length of 8 km (5.0 mi).

Rüegsau has an area of 15.06 km^{2} (5.81 sq mi). As of the 2005/06 survey, a total of 10.15 km^{2} (3.92 mi^{2}) or 67.3% is used for agricultural purposes, while 3.48 km^{2} (1.34 mi^{2}) or 23.1% is forested. Of rest of the municipality 1.29 km^{2} (0.50 mi^{2}) or 8.6% is settled (buildings or roads), 0.13 km^{2} (32 acres) or 0.9% is either rivers or lakes.

From the same survey, housing and buildings made up 5.2% and transportation infrastructure made up 2.3%. A total of 20.6% of the total land area is heavily forested and 2.5% is covered with orchards or small clusters of trees. Of the agricultural land, 19.9% is used for growing crops and 45.6% is pasturage, while 1.8% is used for orchards or vine crops. All the water in the municipality is flowing water.

On 31 December 2009 Amtsbezirk Trachselwald, the municipality's former district, was dissolved. On the following day, 1 January 2010, it joined the newly created Verwaltungskreis Emmental.

== Coat of arms ==
The blazon of the municipal coat of arms is Per pale Gules a Latin Cross pattee couped Argent and of the last a Bend wavy Azure.

== Demographics ==
Rüegsau has a population (as of December 2020) of 3,265. As of 2012, 3.9% of the population are resident foreign nationals. Between the last 2 years (2010-2012) the population changed at a rate of 1.3%. Migration accounted for 2.5%, while births and deaths accounted for 0.0%.

Most of the population (as of 2000) speaks German (2,861 or 97.5%) as their first language, Italian is the second most common (13 or 0.4%) and French is the third (12 or 0.4%).

As of 2013, the population was 49.3% male and 50.7% female. The population was made up of 1,480 Swiss men (47.3% of the population) and 62 (2.0%) non-Swiss men. There were 1,523 Swiss women (48.7%) and 61 (2.0%) non-Swiss women. Of the population in the municipality, 1,096 or about 37.3% were born in Rüegsau and lived there in 2000. There were 1,277 or 43.5% who were born in the same canton, while 290 or 9.9% were born somewhere else in Switzerland, and 158 or 5.4% were born outside of Switzerland.

As of 2012, children and teenagers (0–19 years old) make up 20.7% of the population, while adults (20–64 years old) make up 59.8% and seniors (over 64 years old) make up 19.6%.

As of 2000, there were 1,225 people who were single and never married in the municipality. There were 1,393 married individuals, 217 widows or widowers and 100 individuals who are divorced.

As of 2010, there were 380 households that consist of only one person and 98 households with five or more people. In 2000, a total of 1,139 apartments (90.7% of the total) were permanently occupied, while 83 apartments (6.6%) were seasonally occupied and 34 apartments (2.7%) were empty. As of 2012, the construction rate of new housing units was 4.5 new units per 1000 residents. The vacancy rate for the municipality, in 2013, was 0.3%. In 2012, single family homes made up 41.2% of the total housing in the municipality.

The historical population is given in the following chart:

== Economy ==
The headquarters of the company Blaser Swisslube AG, one of the leading manufacturers cooling agents and lubricants for industrial purposes, are located in the municipality of Rüegsau.

As of 2011, Rüegsau had an unemployment rate of 1.28%. As of 2011, there were a total of 1,231 people employed in the municipality. Of these, there were 215 people employed in the primary economic sector and about 69 businesses involved in this sector. The secondary sector employs 408 people and there were 37 businesses in this sector. The tertiary sector employs 608 people, with 123 businesses in this sector. There were 1,532 residents of the municipality who were employed in some capacity, of which females made up 42.2% of the workforce.

In 2008 there were a total of 962 full-time equivalent jobs. The number of jobs in the primary sector was 153, all of which were in agriculture. The number of jobs in the secondary sector was 355 of which 321 or (90.4%) were in manufacturing and 31 (8.7%) were in construction. The number of jobs in the tertiary sector was 454. In the tertiary sector; 229 or 50.4% were in wholesale or retail sales or the repair of motor vehicles, 22 or 4.8% were in the movement and storage of goods, 33 or 7.3% were in a hotel or restaurant, 10 or 2.2% were the insurance or financial industry, 22 or 4.8% were technical professionals or scientists, 39 or 8.6% were in education and 68 or 15.0% were in health care.

In 2000, there were 460 workers who commuted into the municipality and 961 workers who commuted away. The municipality is a net exporter of workers, with about 2.1 workers leaving the municipality for every one entering. A total of 571 workers (55.4% of the 1,031 total workers in the municipality) both lived and worked in Rüegsau. Of the working population, 13.9% used public transportation to get to work, and 48.2% used a private car.

In 2013 the average church, local and cantonal tax rate on a married resident, with two children, of Rüegsau making 150,000 CHF was 11.4%, while an unmarried resident's rate was 17.5%. For comparison, the median rate for all municipalities in the entire canton was 11.7% and 18.1%, while the nationwide median was 10.6% and 17.4% respectively.

In 2011 there were a total of 1,235 tax payers in the municipality. Of that total, 358 made over 75,000 CHF per year. There were 5 people who made between 15,000 and 20,000 per year. The average income of the over 75,000 CHF group in Rüegsau was 113,315 CHF, while the average across all of Switzerland was 136,785 CHF.

In 2011 a total of 4.2% of the population received direct financial assistance from the government.

== Heritage sites of national significance ==
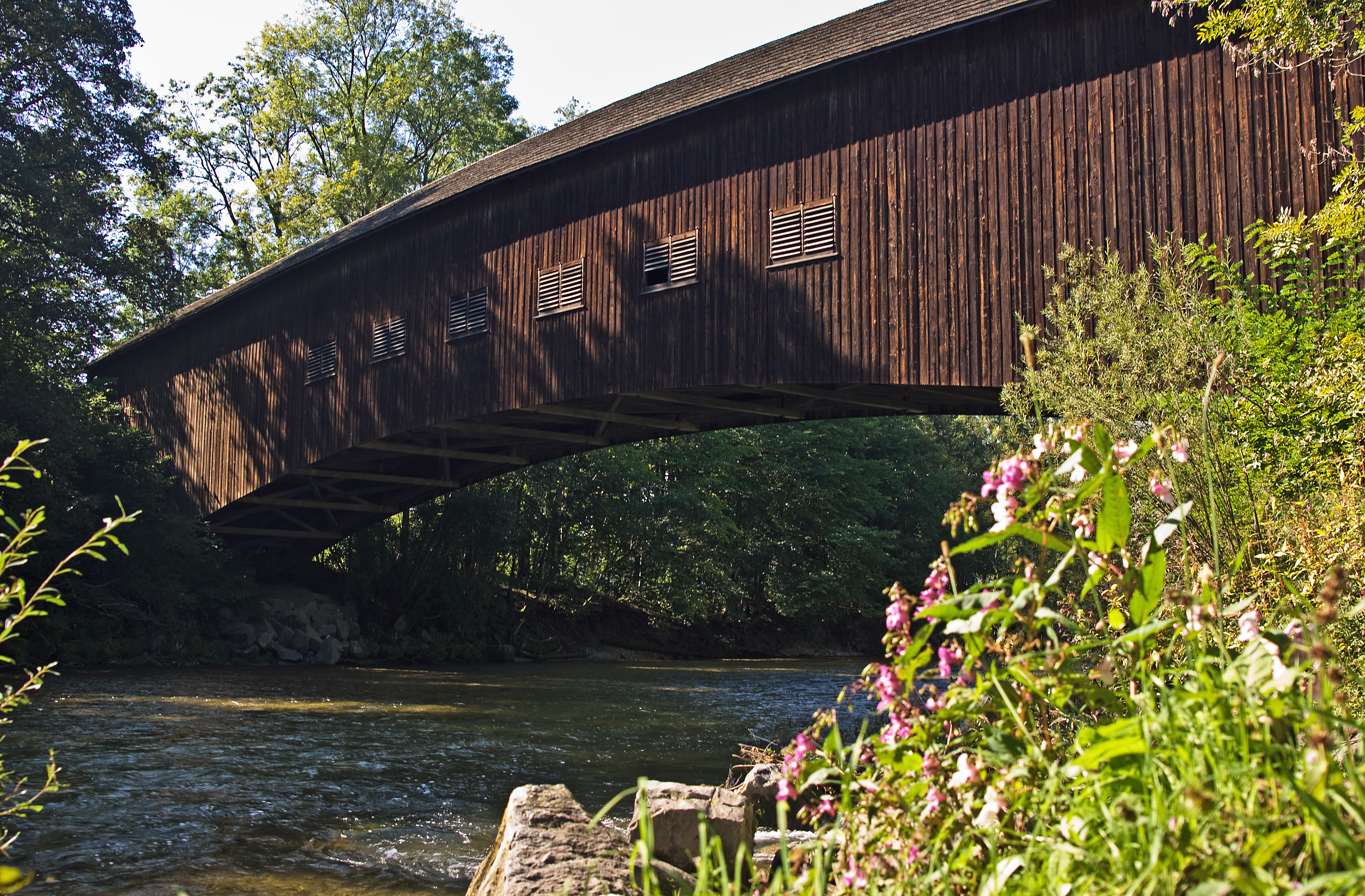
The wooden bridge between Hasle bei Burgdorf and Rüegsau

The Holzbrücke (wooden bridge) is listed as a Swiss heritage site of national significance.

=== Tourism ===
Tourism plays a small, but not insignificant role for this municipality. Several inns, which are typical for the Emmental, provide accommodation; further, holidays on the farms are possible. A small museum of history lies right on the Emme.

The main attraction is the wooden bridge over the Emme between the municipalities of Hasle bei Burgdorf and Rüegsau. With 58.5 meters (192 ft) length, it is probably the largest wooden arch bridge in Europe.

== Transportation ==
Rüegsau shares a train station with its neighboring village Hasle bei Burgdorf called Hasle-Rüegsau.

== Politics ==
In the 2011 federal election the most popular party was the Swiss People's Party (SVP) which received 34.7% of the vote. The next three most popular parties were the Conservative Democratic Party (BDP) (22.1%), the Social Democratic Party (SP) (11.1%) and the Federal Democratic Union of Switzerland (EDU) (8.4%). In the federal election, a total of 1,266 votes were cast, and the voter turnout was 51.5%.

== Religion ==
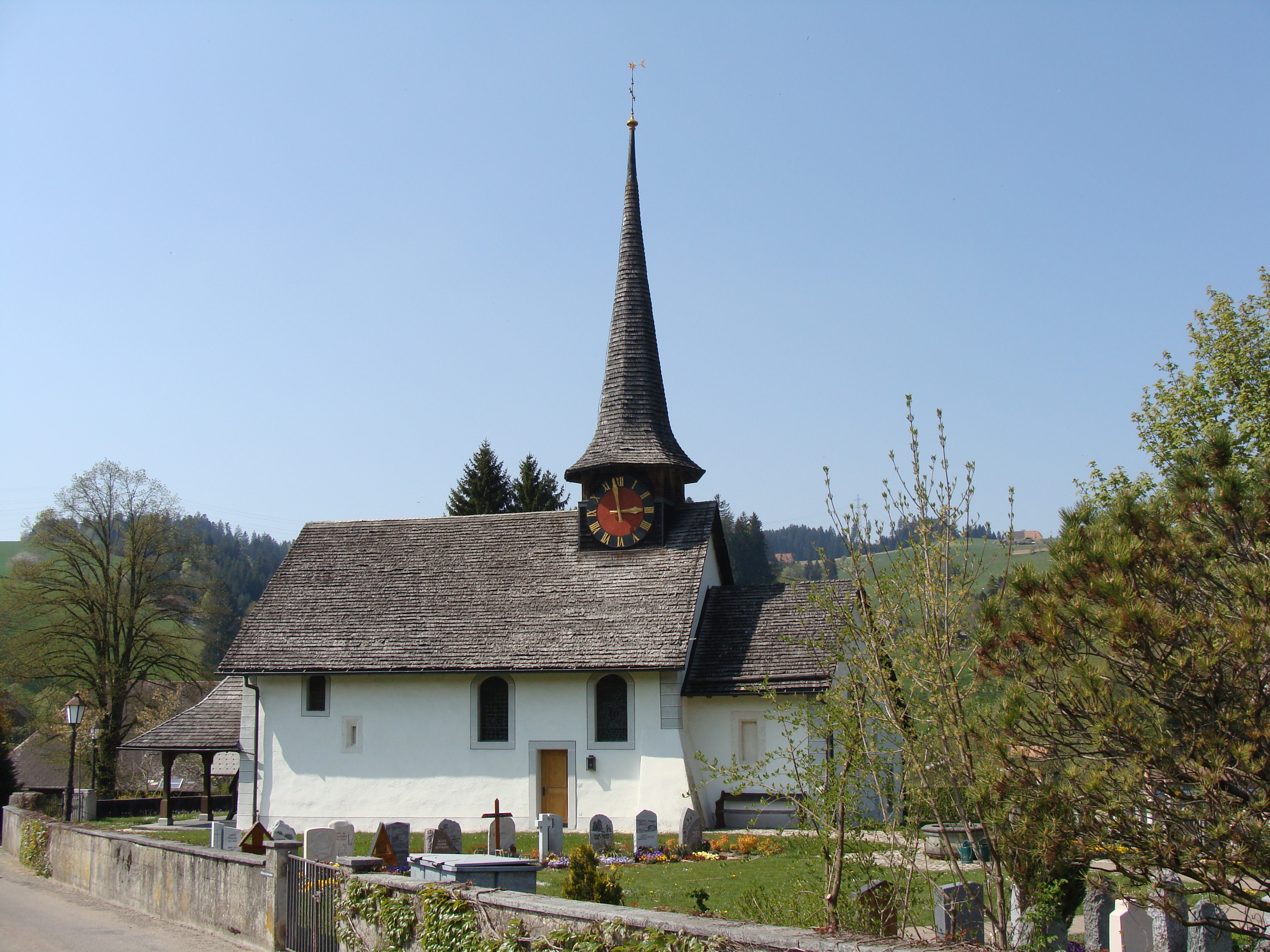
Rüegsau village church

From the 2000 census, 2,397 or 81.7% belonged to the Swiss Reformed Church, while 152 or 5.2% were Roman Catholic. Of the rest of the population, there were 21 members of an Orthodox church (or about 0.72% of the population), there were 2 individuals (or about 0.07% of the population) who belonged to the Christian Catholic Church, and there were 130 individuals (or about 4.43% of the population) who belonged to another Christian church. There were 18 (or about 0.61% of the population) who were Muslim. There were 2 individuals who were Buddhist, 12 individuals who were Hindu and 3 individuals who belonged to another church. 86 (or about 2.93% of the population) belonged to no church, are agnostic or atheist, and 112 individuals (or about 3.82% of the population) did not answer the question.

== Education ==
In Rüegsau about 60.5% of the population have completed non-mandatory upper secondary education, and 14.4% have completed additional higher education (either university or a Fachhochschule). Of the 258 who had completed some form of tertiary schooling listed in the census, 76.0% were Swiss men, 20.2% were Swiss women and 2.3% were non-Swiss women.

The Canton of Bern school system provides one year of non-obligatory Kindergarten, followed by six years of Primary school. This is followed by three years of obligatory lower Secondary school where the students are separated according to ability and aptitude. Following the lower Secondary students may attend additional schooling or they may enter an apprenticeship.

During the 2012–13 school year, there were a total of 459 students attending classes in Rüegsau. There were a total of 54 students in the German language kindergarten classes in the municipality. Of the kindergarten students, 3.7% were permanent or temporary residents of Switzerland (not citizens) and 5.6% have a different mother language than the classroom language. The municipality's primary school had 211 students in German language classes. Of the primary students, 3.8% were permanent or temporary residents of Switzerland (not citizens) and 8.5% have a different mother language than the classroom language. During the same year, the lower secondary school had a total of 194 students. There were 4.1% who were permanent or temporary residents of Switzerland (not citizens) and 4.6% have a different mother language than the classroom language.

As of 2000, there were a total of 362 students attending any school in the municipality. Of those, 271 both lived and attended school in the municipality, while 91 students came from another municipality. During the same year, 149 residents attended schools outside the municipality.
