= Paul Camenisch =

Swiss painter and architect

- Born: 7 November 1893; Zürich, Switzerland
- Died: 13 December 1970 (aged 77); Basel, Switzerland
- Education: ETH Zurich
- Known for: Painting, drawing, watercolour, printmaking
- Movement: Swiss Expressionism

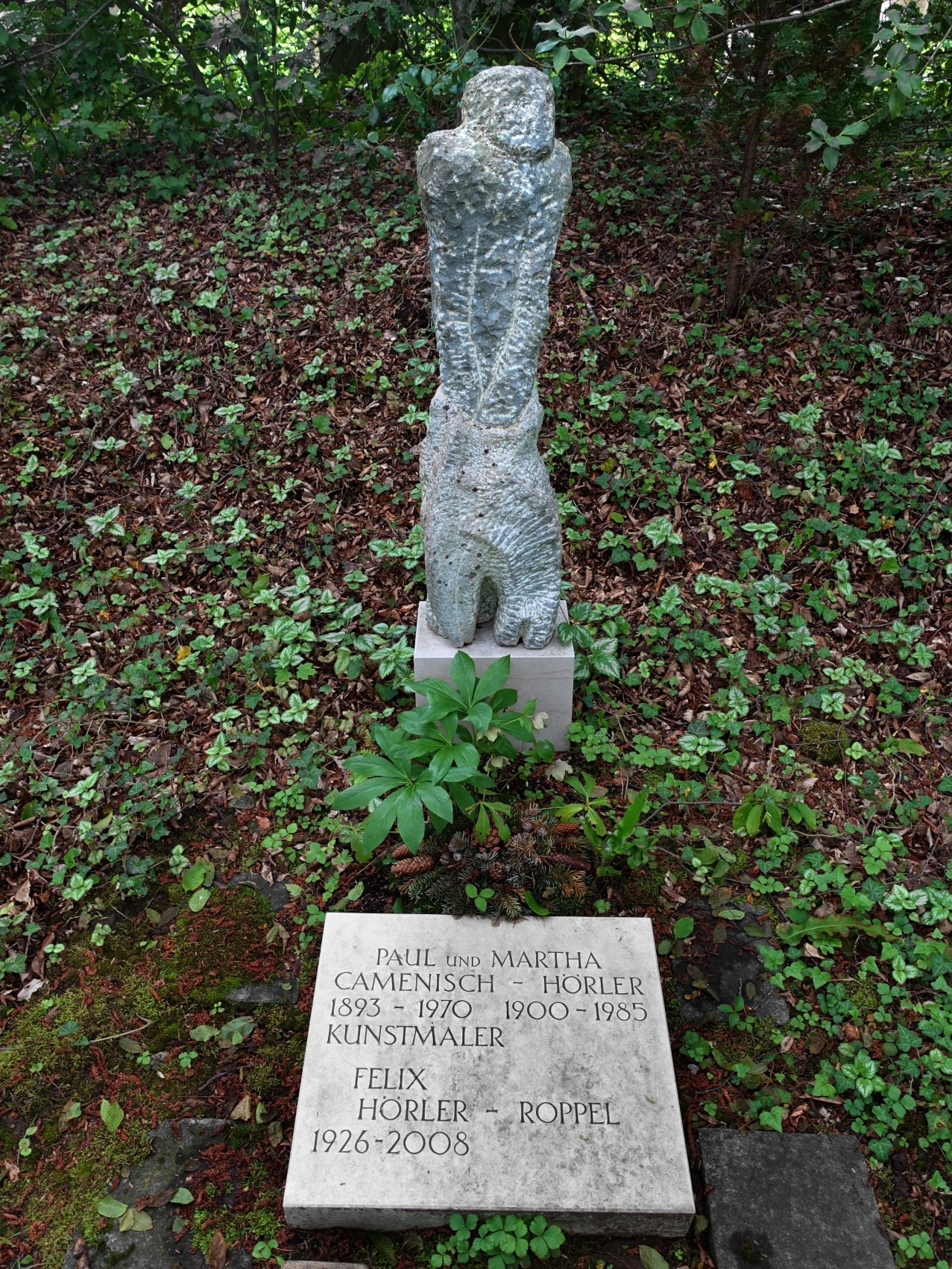
Grave of Paul Camenisch in Basel.

Paul Camenisch (7 November 1893 – 13 December 1970) was a Swiss Expressionist painter and architect. He was a co-founder of the artists’ groups Rot-Blau, Rot-Blau II and Gruppe 33, and served as president of Gruppe 33 from 1936 to 1952. His work included Expressionist landscapes, watercolours of imaginary architecture, and later paintings that moved between domestic idylls and political and social criticism.

== Biography ==
Paul Camenisch was born in Zurich on 7 November 1893. After his father’s death, his family moved to Basel in 1904. He studied architecture at ETH Zurich under Karl Moser from 1912 to 1916, worked as a construction manager in Germany from 1916 to 1919, and then worked in architecture offices in Basel from 1919 to 1923, mainly with Hans Bernoulli.

Camenisch co-founded Rot-Blau with other young Basel artists influenced by Ernst Ludwig Kirchner. He later a founding member of Rot-Blau II and Gruppe 33. He served as president of Gruppe 33 from 1936 to 1952. In 1933, he initiated the Swiss relief organisation for women and children in Germany, and in 1944 he was a founding member of the Swiss Party of Labour. He served in the Grand Council of Basel-Stadt until 1956. After travelling to the Soviet Union in 1953, he was excluded from Gruppe 33.

Camenisch died in Basel on 13 December 1970.

== Work ==
Camenisch worked in painting, drawing, watercolour, printmaking and architecture. His early work included watercolours of imaginary architecture. In 1926, he painted a series of Expressionist landscapes in the Mendrisiotto. He spent that summer with Ernst Ludwig Kirchner, who responded cautiously to Camenisch’s new works.

By the late 1920s, his style had shifted toward flat, idiosyncratic and sometimes hallucinatory compositions. In the 1930s, his paintings became more detailed and naturalistic, with a drier, chalkier palette. His work moved between bourgeois idylls and politically and socially critical paintings.

Exhibitions of Camenisch’s work were held at Galerie de Beaune in Paris in 1939 and at the Bündner Kunstmuseum in Chur in 1941. Retrospectives followed at Kunsthalle Basel in 1970, and at the Bündner Kunstmuseum and Kunstmuseum Olten in 1985.

== Bibliography ==
- Camenisch, Paul; Stutzer, Beat (1985). Paul Camenisch (1893-1970) : Chur, Bündner Kunstmuseum; Kunstmuseum Olten, 1985. Kunstmuseum Olten.
