= Niederwil =

Niederwil may refer to:

in Switzerland:

- Niederwil, Aargau
- Niederwil, Solothurn
- Niederwil, Zug, part of Cham
