= Riedholz =

- Municipality
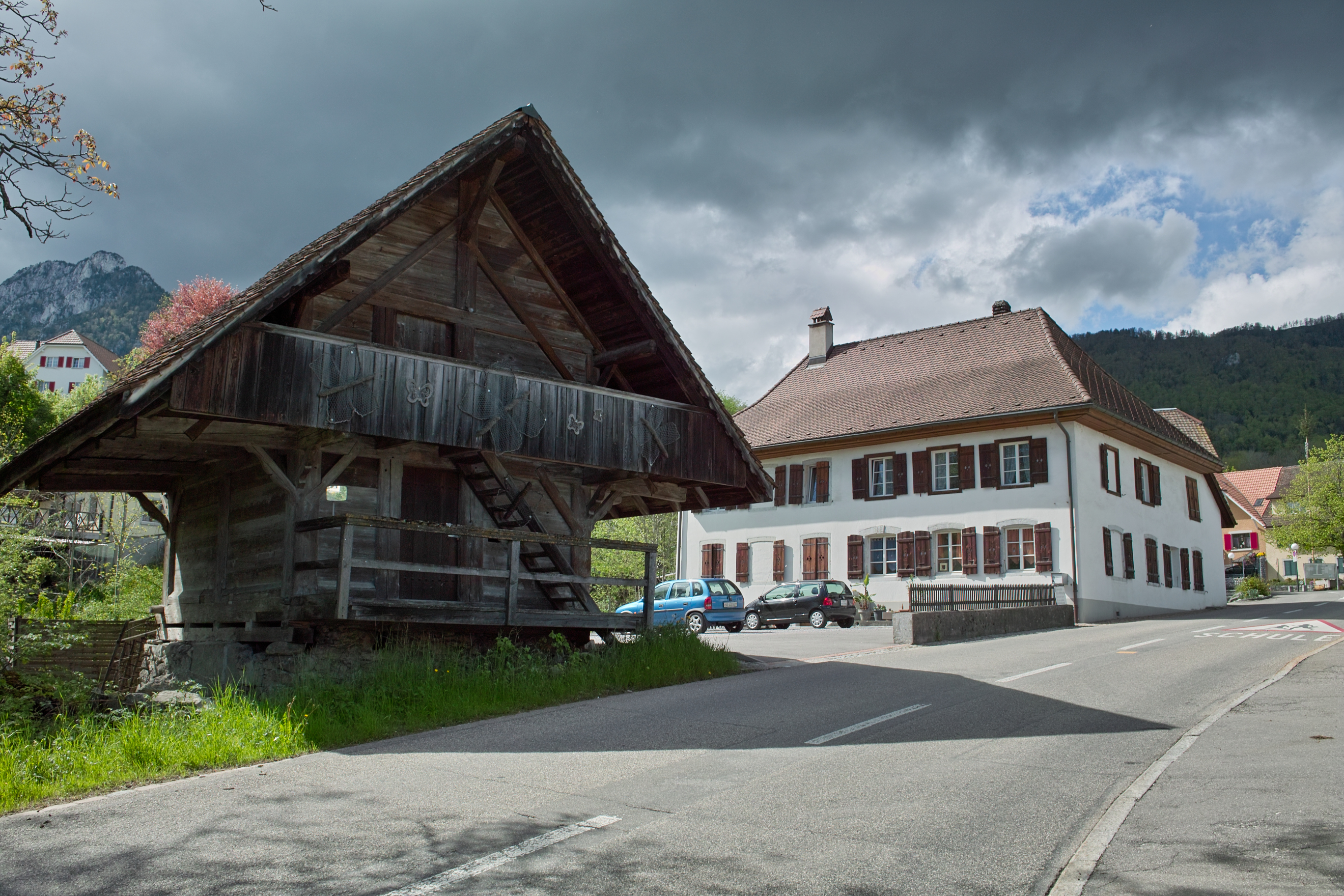

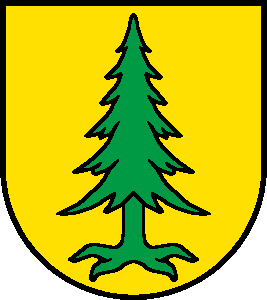
- Coat of arms
- Location of Riedholz
- Location within Switzerland Location within Canton of Solothurn
- Coordinates: 47°14′N 7°34′E
- Country: Switzerland
- Canton: Solothurn
- District: Lebern

Area
  - Total: 7.2 km^{2} (2.8 sq mi)
- Elevation: 471 m (1,545 ft)

Population (December 2020)
  - Total: 2,316
  - Density: 320/km^{2} (830/sq mi)
- Time zone: UTC+01:00 (CET)
  - Summer (DST): UTC+02:00 (CEST)
- Postal code: 4533
- SFOS number: 2554
- ISO 3166 code: CH-SO
- Surrounded by: Deitingen, Feldbrunnen-Sankt Niklaus, Flumenthal, Hubersdorf, Luterbach, Niederwil, Rüttenen, Zuchwil
- Website: riedholz.ch

Riedholz is a municipality in the district of Lebern in the canton of Solothurn in Switzerland. In 2011 Niederwil merged into Riedholz.

== History ==
Riedholz is first mentioned in 1367 as im Rietholz. Niederwil is first mentioned in 1292 as Lomolzwile.

== Geography ==
Following the merger, the new, larger municipality had an area (as of 2011) of 7.2 km^{2} (2.8 sq mi). 43.6% was used for agricultural purposes and 39% was forested. Settlement areas took up 14.6% and the total unproductive area took up 2.8% of the total.

Riedholz had an area, before the merger in as of 2009, of 4.89 square kilometers (1.89 sq mi). Of this area, 1.78 km^{2} (0.69 sq mi) or 36.4% is used for agricultural purposes, while 1.99 km^{2} (0.77 sq mi) or 40.7% is forested. Of the rest of the land, 0.96 km^{2} (0.37 sq mi) or 19.6% is settled (buildings or roads), 0.19 km^{2} (0.073 sq mi) or 3.9% is either rivers or lakes.

Of the built up area, industrial buildings made up 2.7% of the total area while housing and buildings made up 8.8% and transportation infrastructure made up 5.9%. Power and water infrastructure as well as other special developed areas made up 1.2% of the area Out of the forested land, all of the forested land area is covered with heavy forests. Of the agricultural land, 22.3% is used for growing crops and 12.7% is pastures, while 1.4% is used for orchards or vine crops. All the water in the municipality is flowing water.

The municipality is located in the Lebern district, between a moraine and the Aare river. It consists of the village of Riedholz and Niederwil as well as scattered hamlets and individual settlements, including Attisholz which has had a thermal bath since the 15th Century.

== Coat of arms ==
The blazon of the municipal coat of arms is Or a Fir Tree eradicated Vert.

== Demographics ==
Riedholz has a population (as of December 2020) of 2,316. As of 2008, 8.2% of the population are resident foreign nationals. Over the last 10 years (1999–2009 ) the population has changed at a rate of 12.5%.

Most of the population (as of 2000) speaks German (1,427 or 95.8%), with Italian being second most common (12 or 0.8%) and Albanian being third (11 or 0.7%). There are 7 people who speak French and 2 people who speak Romansh.

As of 2008, the gender distribution of the population was 49.5% male and 50.5% female. The population was made up of 752 Swiss men (44.5% of the population) and 84 (5.0%) non-Swiss men. There were 777 Swiss women (46.0%) and 77 (4.6%) non-Swiss women. Of the population in the municipality 374 or about 25.1% were born in Riedholz and lived there in 2000. There were 548 or 36.8% who were born in the same canton, while 374 or 25.1% were born somewhere else in Switzerland, and 164 or 11.0% were born outside of Switzerland.

In 2008 there were 10 live births to Swiss citizens and were 18 deaths of Swiss citizens and 1 non-Swiss citizen death. Ignoring immigration and emigration, the population of Swiss citizens decreased by 8 while the foreign population decreased by 1. There were 2 Swiss men who immigrated back to Switzerland and 1 Swiss woman who emigrated from Switzerland. At the same time, there were 6 non-Swiss men and 2 non-Swiss women who immigrated from another country to Switzerland. The total Swiss population change in 2008 (from all sources, including moves across municipal borders) was an increase of 2 and the non-Swiss population increased by 8 people. This represents a population growth rate of 0.6%.

The age distribution, as of 2000, in Riedholz is; 89 children or 6.0% of the population are between 0 and 6 years old and 247 teenagers or 16.6% are between 7 and 19. Of the adult population, 81 people or 5.4% of the population are between 20 and 24 years old. 419 people or 28.1% are between 25 and 44, and 406 people or 27.3% are between 45 and 64. The senior population distribution is 198 people or 13.3% of the population are between 65 and 79 years old and there are 49 people or 3.3% who are over 80.

As of 2000, there were 585 people who were single and never married in the municipality. There were 762 married individuals, 80 widows or widowers and 62 individuals who are divorced.

As of 2000, there were 757 private households in the municipality, and an average of 2.4 persons per household. There were 166 households that consist of only one person and 48 households with five or more people. Out of a total of 622 households that answered this question, 26.7% were households made up of just one person and there were 7 adults who lived with their parents. Of the rest of the households, there are 211 married couples without children, 199 married couples with children There were 27 single parents with a child or children. There were 5 households that were made up of unrelated people and 7 households that were made up of some sort of institution or another collective housing.

In 2000 there were 300 single family homes (or 71.8% of the total) out of a total of 418 inhabited buildings. There were 72 multi-family buildings (17.2%), along with 34 multi-purpose buildings that were mostly used for housing (8.1%) and 12 other use buildings (commercial or industrial) that also had some housing (2.9%). Of the single family homes 16 were built before 1919, while 28 were built between 1990 and 2000. The greatest number of single family homes (65) were built between 1946 and 1960.

In 2000 there were 660 apartments in the municipality. The most common apartment size was 4 rooms of which there were 211. There were 1 single room apartments and 270 apartments with five or more rooms. Of these apartments, a total of 604 apartments (91.5% of the total) were permanently occupied, while 34 apartments (5.2%) were seasonally occupied and 22 apartments (3.3%) were empty. As of 2009, the construction rate of new housing units was 1.4 new units per 1000 residents. The vacancy rate for the municipality, in 2010, was 3.68%.

== Historic Population ==
The historical population is given in the following chart:

== Politics ==
In the 2007 federal election the most popular party was the SVP which received 27.14% of the vote. The next three most popular parties were the FDP (26.67%), the SP (18.99%) and the CVP (14.8%). In the federal election, a total of 665 votes were cast, and the voter turnout was 52.9%.

== Economy ==
As of 2010, Riedholz had an unemployment rate of 2.6%. As of 2008, there were 42 people employed in the primary economic sector and about 18 businesses involved in this sector. 483 people were employed in the secondary sector and there were 20 businesses in this sector. 252 people were employed in the tertiary sector, with 51 businesses in this sector. There were 803 residents of the municipality who were employed in some capacity, of which females made up 43.3% of the workforce.

In 2008 the total number of full-time equivalent jobs was 640. The number of jobs in the primary sector was 13, all of which were in agriculture. The number of jobs in the secondary sector was 458 of which 438 or (95.6%) were in manufacturing and 14 (3.1%) were in construction. The number of jobs in the tertiary sector was 169. In the tertiary sector; 28 or 16.6% were in wholesale or retail sales or the repair of motor vehicles, 4 or 2.4% were in the movement and storage of goods, 30 or 17.8% were in a hotel or restaurant, 11 or 6.5% were in the information industry, 1 was the insurance or financial industry, 9 or 5.3% were technical professionals or scientists, 62 or 36.7% were in education and 15 or 8.9% were in health care.

In 2000, there were 492 workers who commuted into the municipality and 624 workers who commuted away. The municipality is a net exporter of workers, with about 1.3 workers leaving the municipality for every one entering. Of the working population, 14% used public transportation to get to work, and 61.1% used a private car.

== Religion ==
From the 2000 census, 586 or 39.4% were Roman Catholic, while 578 or 38.8% belonged to the Swiss Reformed Church. Of the rest of the population, there were 6 members of an Orthodox church (or about 0.40% of the population), there were 11 individuals (or about 0.74% of the population) who belonged to the Christian Catholic Church, and there were 10 individuals (or about 0.67% of the population) who belonged to another Christian church. There were 34 (or about 2.28% of the population) who were Islamic. There was 1 person who was Buddhist and 2 individuals who belonged to another church. 242 (or about 16.25% of the population) belonged to no church, are agnostic or atheist, and 19 individuals (or about 1.28% of the population) did not answer the question.

== Education ==
In Riedholz about 657 or (44.1%) of the population have completed non-mandatory upper secondary education, and 231 or (15.5%) have completed additional higher education (either university or a Fachhochschule). Of the 231 who completed tertiary schooling, 74.5% were Swiss men, 16.0% were Swiss women, 6.5% were non-Swiss men and 3.0% were non-Swiss women.

During the 2010–2011 school year there were a total of 150 students in the Riedholz school system. The education system in the Canton of Solothurn allows young children to attend two years of non-obligatory Kindergarten. During that school year, there were 36 children in kindergarten. The canton's school system requires students to attend six years of primary school, with some of the children attending smaller, specialized classes. In the municipality there were 114 students in primary school. The secondary school program consists of three lower, obligatory years of schooling, followed by three to five years of optional, advanced schools. All the lower secondary students from Riedholz attend their school in a neighboring municipality.

As of 2000, there were 14 students in Riedholz who came from another municipality, while 114 residents attended schools outside the municipality.
