= Luterbach =

- Municipality
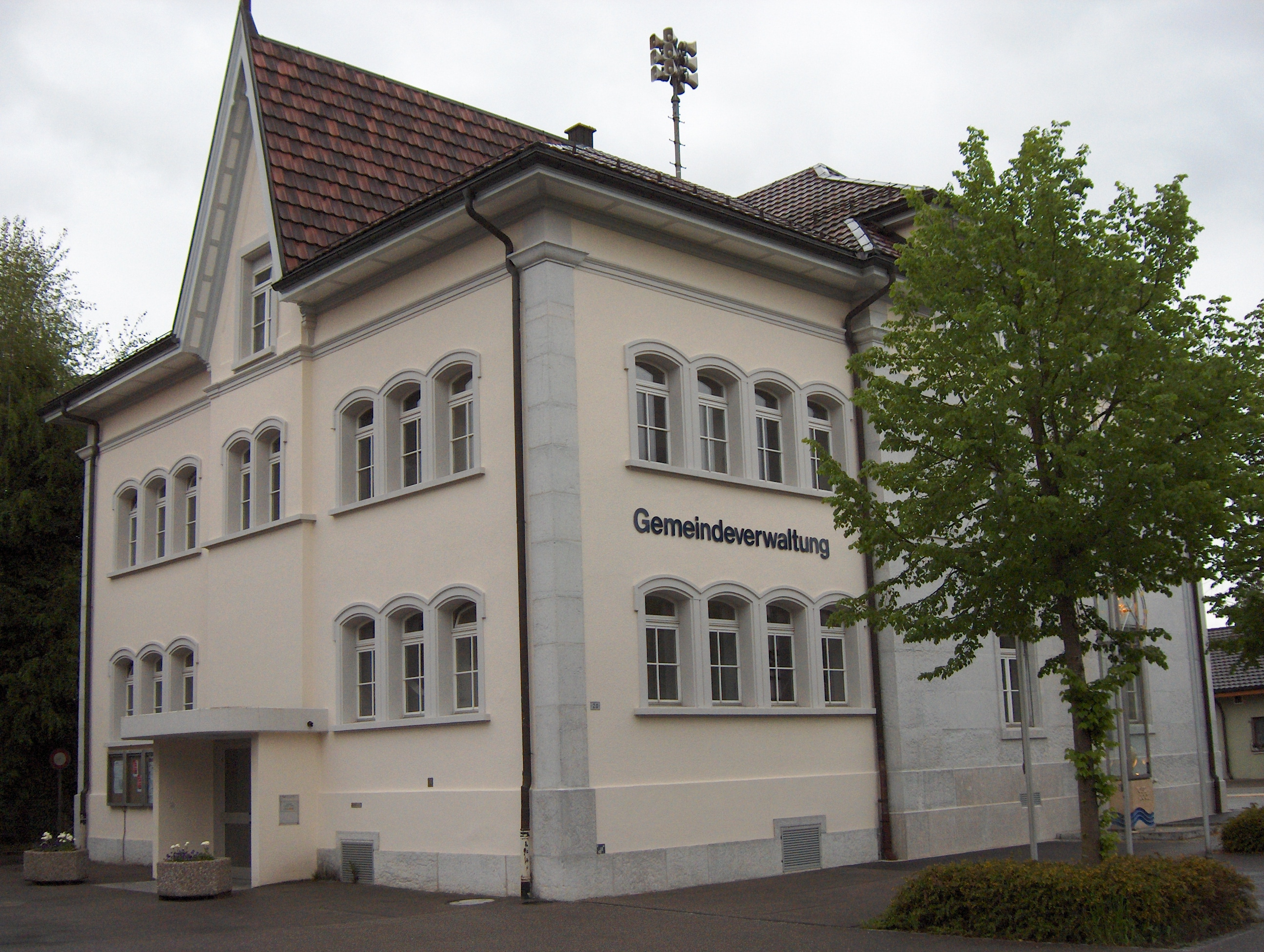
- Luterbach village administration building

- Coat of arms
- Location of Luterbach
- Location within Switzerland Location within Canton of Solothurn
- Coordinates: 47°13′N 7°35′E
- Country: Switzerland
- Canton: Solothurn
- District: Wasseramt

Area
  - Total: 4.52 km^{2} (1.75 sq mi)
- Elevation: 431 m (1,414 ft)

Population (December 2020)
  - Total: 3,555
  - Density: 787/km^{2} (2,040/sq mi)
- Time zone: UTC+01:00 (CET)
  - Summer (DST): UTC+02:00 (CEST)
- Postal code: 4542
- SFOS number: 2527
- ISO 3166 code: CH-SO
- Surrounded by: Deitingen, Derendingen, Riedholz, Zuchwil
- Website: www.luterbach.ch

Luterbach is a municipality in the district of Wasseramt in the canton of Solothurn in Switzerland.

== History ==
Luterbach is first mentioned in 1052 as lutere Bach, though this identification is disputed. In 1319 it was mentioned as ville Luterbach.

== Geography ==
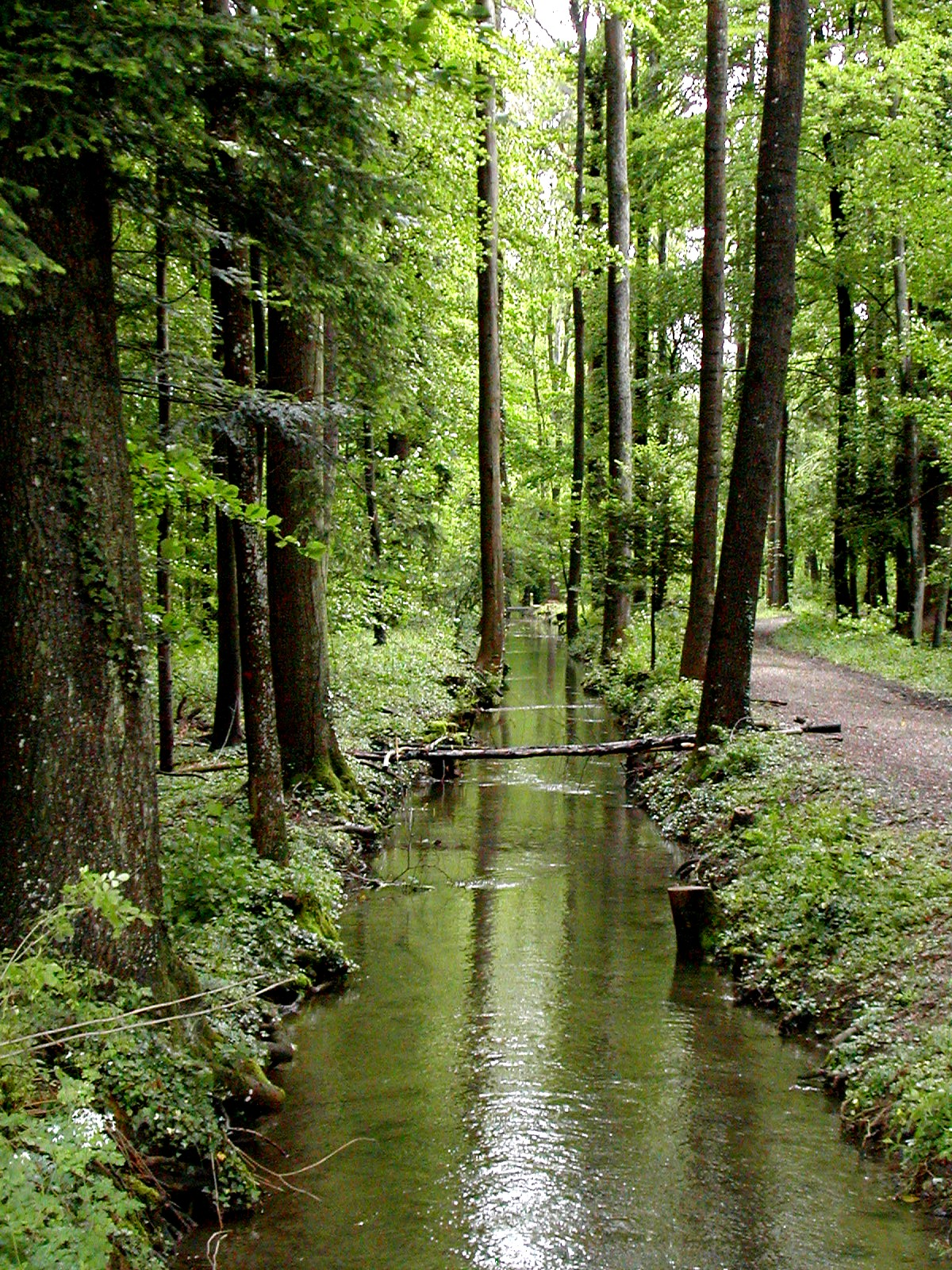
Stream near Luterbach

Aerial view (1970)

Luterbach has an area, as of 2009, of 4.52 square kilometers (1.75 sq mi). Of this area, 1.63 km^{2} (0.63 sq mi) or 36.1% is used for agricultural purposes, while 1.18 km^{2} (0.46 sq mi) or 26.1% is forested. Of the rest of the land, 1.57 km^{2} (0.61 sq mi) or 34.7% is settled (buildings or roads), 0.16 km^{2} (0.062 sq mi) or 3.5% is either rivers or lakes.

Of the built up area, industrial buildings made up 7.7% of the total area while housing and buildings made up 15.0% and transportation infrastructure made up 8.2%. Power and water infrastructure as well as other special developed areas made up 2.4% of the area while parks, green belts and sports fields made up 1.3%. Out of the forested land, 23.5% of the total land area is heavily forested and 2.7% is covered with orchards or small clusters of trees. Of the agricultural land, 30.3% is used for growing crops and 4.0% is pastures, while 1.8% is used for orchards or vine crops. All the water in the municipality is flowing water.

The municipality is located in the Wasseramt district, south-east of the confluence of the Aare and Emme rivers. Due to constant flooding risk from the flat topography and changes in the course of the Emme, the municipality now stands about 1 km (0.62 mi) from the river.

The municipalities of Biberist, Derendingen, Luterbach, Bellach, Langendorf and Solothurn are considering a merger at a date in the future into the new municipality of with an, as of 2011, undetermined name.

== Coat of arms ==
The blazon of the municipal coat of arms is Argent a Bar wavy Azure and in chief a Mullet of Five of the same.

== Demographics ==
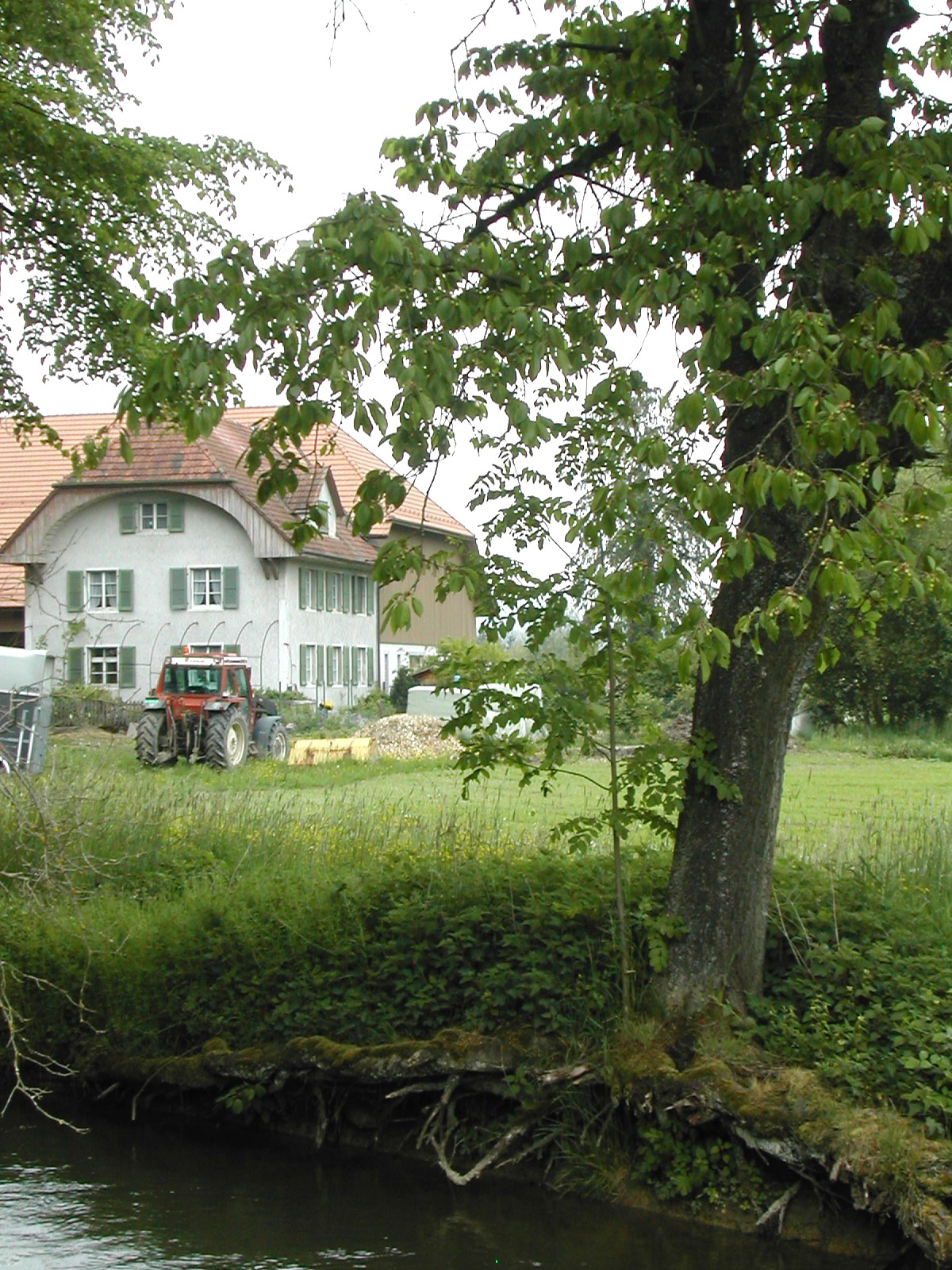
Farm house near a stream in Luterbach

Luterbach has a population (as of December 2020) of 3,555. As of 2008, 14.9% of the population are resident foreign nationals. Over the last 10 years (1999–2009 ) the population has changed at a rate of 4.3%. It has changed at a rate of 4.6% due to migration and at a rate of 0% due to births and deaths.

Most of the population (as of 2000) speaks German (2,818 or 90.6%), with Italian being second most common (89 or 2.9%) and Serbo-Croatian being third (60 or 1.9%). There are 12 people who speak French and 2 people who speak Romansh.

As of 2008, the gender distribution of the population was 48.9% male and 51.1% female. The population was made up of 1,332 Swiss men (40.1% of the population) and 292 (8.8%) non-Swiss men. There were 1,446 Swiss women (43.6%) and 250 (7.5%) non-Swiss women. Of the population in the municipality 858 or about 27.6% were born in Luterbach and lived there in 2000. There were 1,020 or 32.8% who were born in the same canton, while 710 or 22.8% were born somewhere else in Switzerland, and 429 or 13.8% were born outside of Switzerland.

In 2008 there were 22 live births to Swiss citizens and 5 births to non-Swiss citizens, and in same time span there were 23 deaths of Swiss citizens and 1 non-Swiss citizen death. Ignoring immigration and emigration, the population of Swiss citizens decreased by 1 while the foreign population increased by 4. There was 1 Swiss man and 2 Swiss women who emigrated from Switzerland. At the same time, there were 3 non-Swiss men and 4 non-Swiss women who immigrated from another country to Switzerland. The total Swiss population change in 2008 (from all sources, including moves across municipal borders) was an increase of 19 and the non-Swiss population increased by 18 people. This represents a population growth rate of 1.2%.

The age distribution, as of 2000, in Luterbach is; 223 children or 7.2% of the population are between 0 and 6 years old and 468 teenagers or 15.0% are between 7 and 19. Of the adult population, 146 people or 4.7% of the population are between 20 and 24 years old. 983 people or 31.6% are between 25 and 44, and 819 people or 26.3% are between 45 and 64. The senior population distribution is 365 people or 11.7% of the population are between 65 and 79 years old and there are 108 people or 3.5% who are over 80.

As of 2000, there were 1,217 people who were single and never married in the municipality. There were 1,519 married individuals, 186 widows or widowers and 190 individuals who are divorced.

As of 2000, there were 1,343 private households in the municipality, and an average of 2.3 persons per household. There were 424 households that consist of only one person and 80 households with five or more people. Out of a total of 1,357 households that answered this question, 31.2% were households made up of just one person and there were 9 adults who lived with their parents. Of the rest of the households, there are 442 married couples without children, 392 married couples with children There were 59 single parents with a child or children. There were 17 households that were made up of unrelated people and 14 households that were made up of some sort of institution or another collective housing.

In 2000 there were 481 single family homes (or 65.8% of the total) out of a total of 731 inhabited buildings. There were 168 multi-family buildings (23.0%), along with 51 multi-purpose buildings that were mostly used for housing (7.0%) and 31 other use buildings (commercial or industrial) that also had some housing (4.2%). Of the single family homes 27 were built before 1919, while 43 were built between 1990 and 2000. The greatest number of single family homes (121) were built between 1946 and 1960.

In 2000 there were 1,432 apartments in the municipality. The most common apartment size was 4 rooms of which there were 453. There were 48 single room apartments and 478 apartments with five or more rooms. Of these apartments, a total of 1,319 apartments (92.1% of the total) were permanently occupied, while 74 apartments (5.2%) were seasonally occupied and 39 apartments (2.7%) were empty. As of 2009, the construction rate of new housing units was 2.4 new units per 1000 residents. The vacancy rate for the municipality, in 2010, was 1.16%.

The historical population is given in the following chart:

== Politics ==
In the 2007 federal election the most popular party was the SVP which received 27.93% of the vote. The next three most popular parties were the SP (23.47%), the CVP (20.12%) and the FDP (16.13%). In the federal election, a total of 1,024 votes were cast, and the voter turnout was 45.1%.

== Economy ==
As of 2010, Luterbach had an unemployment rate of 4.5%. As of 2008, there were 14 people employed in the primary economic sector and about 6 businesses involved in this sector. 713 people were employed in the secondary sector and there were 40 businesses in this sector. 614 people were employed in the tertiary sector, with 86 businesses in this sector. There were 1,692 residents of the municipality who were employed in some capacity, of which females made up 42.7% of the workforce.

In 2008 the total number of full-time equivalent jobs was 1,177. The number of jobs in the primary sector was 6, all of which were in agriculture. The number of jobs in the secondary sector was 666 of which 475 or (71.3%) were in manufacturing and 181 (27.2%) were in construction. The number of jobs in the tertiary sector was 505. In the tertiary sector; 202 or 40.0% were in wholesale or retail sales or the repair of motor vehicles, 114 or 22.6% were in the movement and storage of goods, 24 or 4.8% were in a hotel or restaurant, 12 or 2.4% were in the information industry, 4 or 0.8% were the insurance or financial industry, 17 or 3.4% were technical professionals or scientists, 28 or 5.5% were in education and 63 or 12.5% were in health care.

In 2000, there were 771 workers who commuted into the municipality and 1,317 workers who commuted away. The municipality is a net exporter of workers, with about 1.7 workers leaving the municipality for every one entering. Of the working population, 11.8% used public transportation to get to work, and 60.8% used a private car.

== Religion ==
From the 2000 census, 1,268 or 40.7% were Roman Catholic, while 1,008 or 32.4% belonged to the Swiss Reformed Church. Of the rest of the population, there were 30 members of an Orthodox church (or about 0.96% of the population), there were 8 individuals (or about 0.26% of the population) who belonged to the Christian Catholic Church, and there were 28 individuals (or about 0.90% of the population) who belonged to another Christian church. There were 158 (or about 5.08% of the population) who were Islamic. There were 6 individuals who were Buddhist, 6 individuals who were Hindu and 1 individual who belonged to another church. 519 (or about 16.68% of the population) belonged to no church, are agnostic or atheist, and 80 individuals (or about 2.57% of the population) did not answer the question.

== Education ==
In Luterbach about 1,309 or (42.1%) of the population have completed non-mandatory upper secondary education, and 328 or (10.5%) have completed additional higher education (either university or a Fachhochschule). Of the 328 who completed tertiary schooling, 71.6% were Swiss men, 19.8% were Swiss women, 6.1% were non-Swiss men and 2.4% were non-Swiss women.

During the 2010-2011 school year there were a total of 276 students in the Luterbach school system. The education system in the Canton of Solothurn allows young children to attend two years of non-obligatory Kindergarten. During that school year, there were 62 children in kindergarten. The canton's school system requires students to attend six years of primary school, with some of the children attending smaller, specialized classes. In the municipality there were 193 students in primary school and 21 students in the special, smaller classes. The secondary school program consists of three lower, obligatory years of schooling, followed by three to five years of optional, advanced schools. All the lower secondary students from Luterbach attend their school in a neighboring municipality.

As of 2000, there were 9 students in Luterbach who came from another municipality, while 199 residents attended schools outside the municipality.
