= Deitingen =

- Municipality
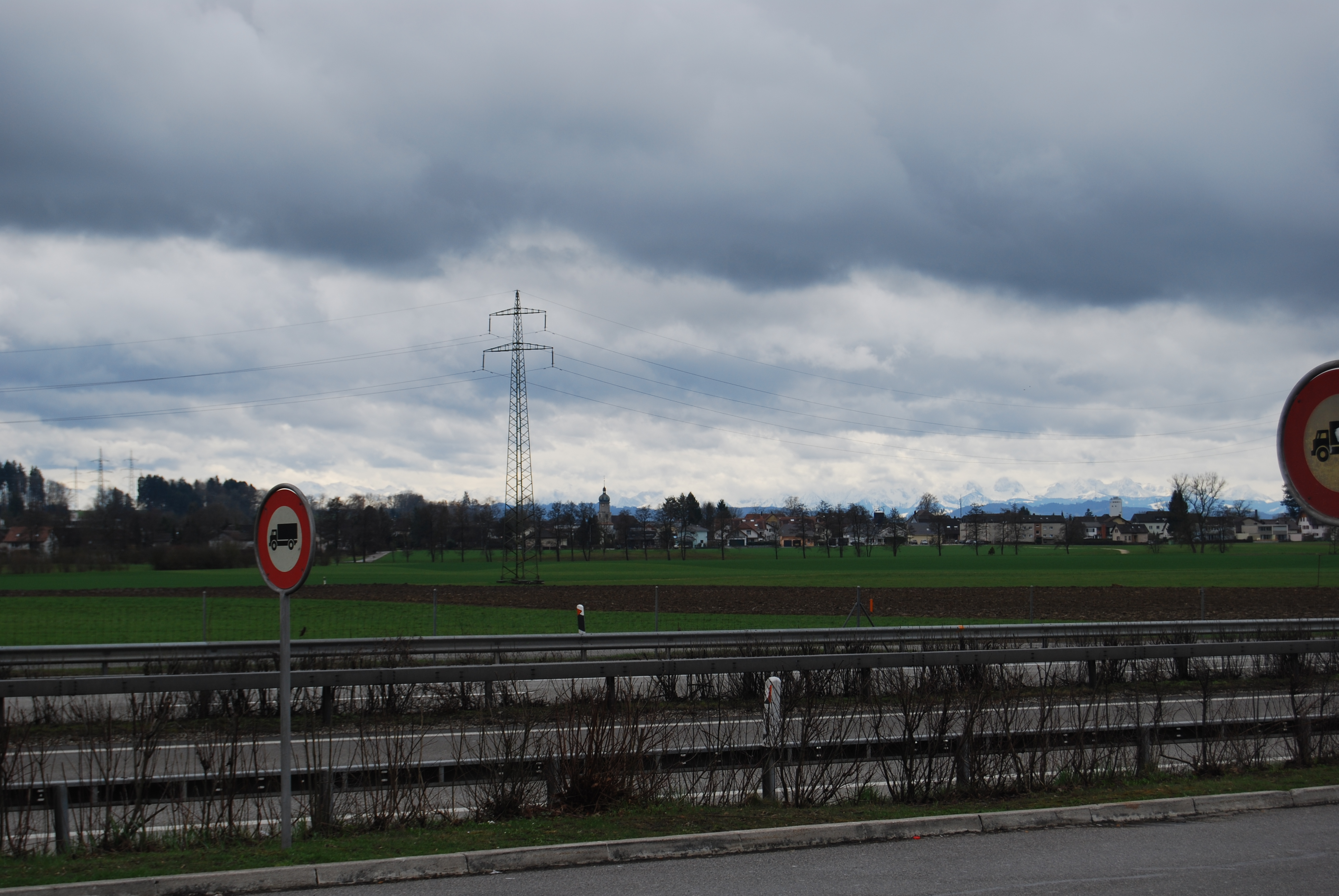
- Deitingen village

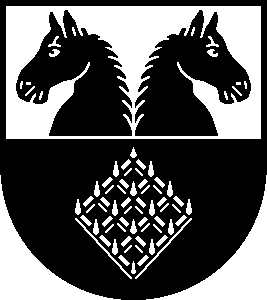
- Coat of arms
- Location of Deitingen
- Location within Switzerland Location within Canton of Solothurn
- Coordinates: 47°13′N 7°37′E
- Country: Switzerland
- Canton: Solothurn
- District: Wasseramt

Area
  - Total: 7.64 km^{2} (2.95 sq mi)
- Elevation: 430 m (1,410 ft)

Population (December 2020)
  - Total: 2,227
  - Density: 291/km^{2} (755/sq mi)
- Time zone: UTC+01:00 (CET)
  - Summer (DST): UTC+02:00 (CEST)
- Postal code: 4543
- SFOS number: 2516
- ISO 3166 code: CH-SO
- Surrounded by: Derendingen, Flumenthal, Luterbach, Riedholz, Subingen, Wangen an der Aare (BE), Wangenried (BE)
- Website: www.deitingen.ch

Deitingen is a municipality in the district of Wasseramt in the canton of Solothurn in Switzerland.

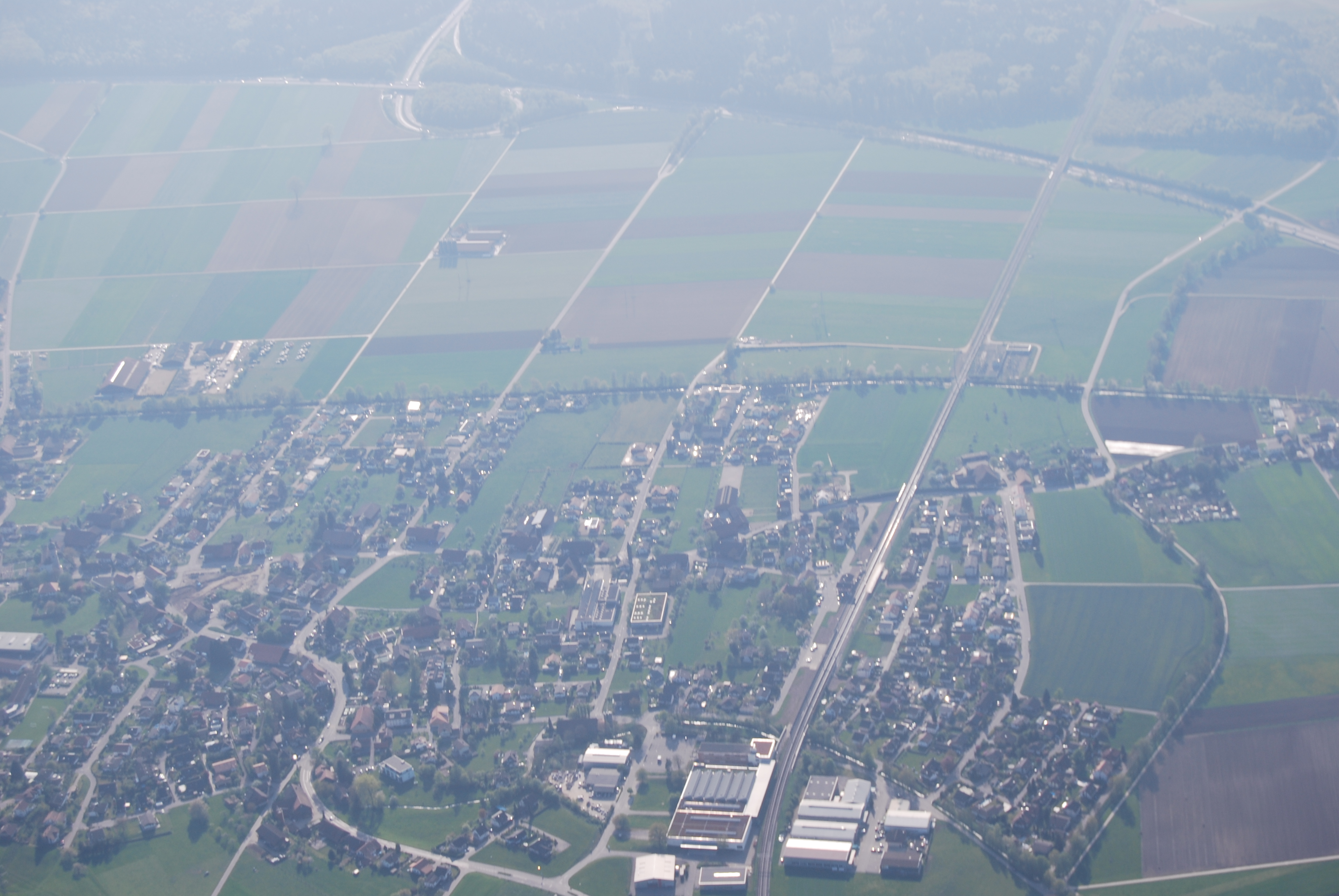
Deitingen, aerial view from a ballon

== History ==
Deitingen is first mentioned in 1244 as Teytingen. In 1252 it was mentioned as Tuetingen.

== Geography ==
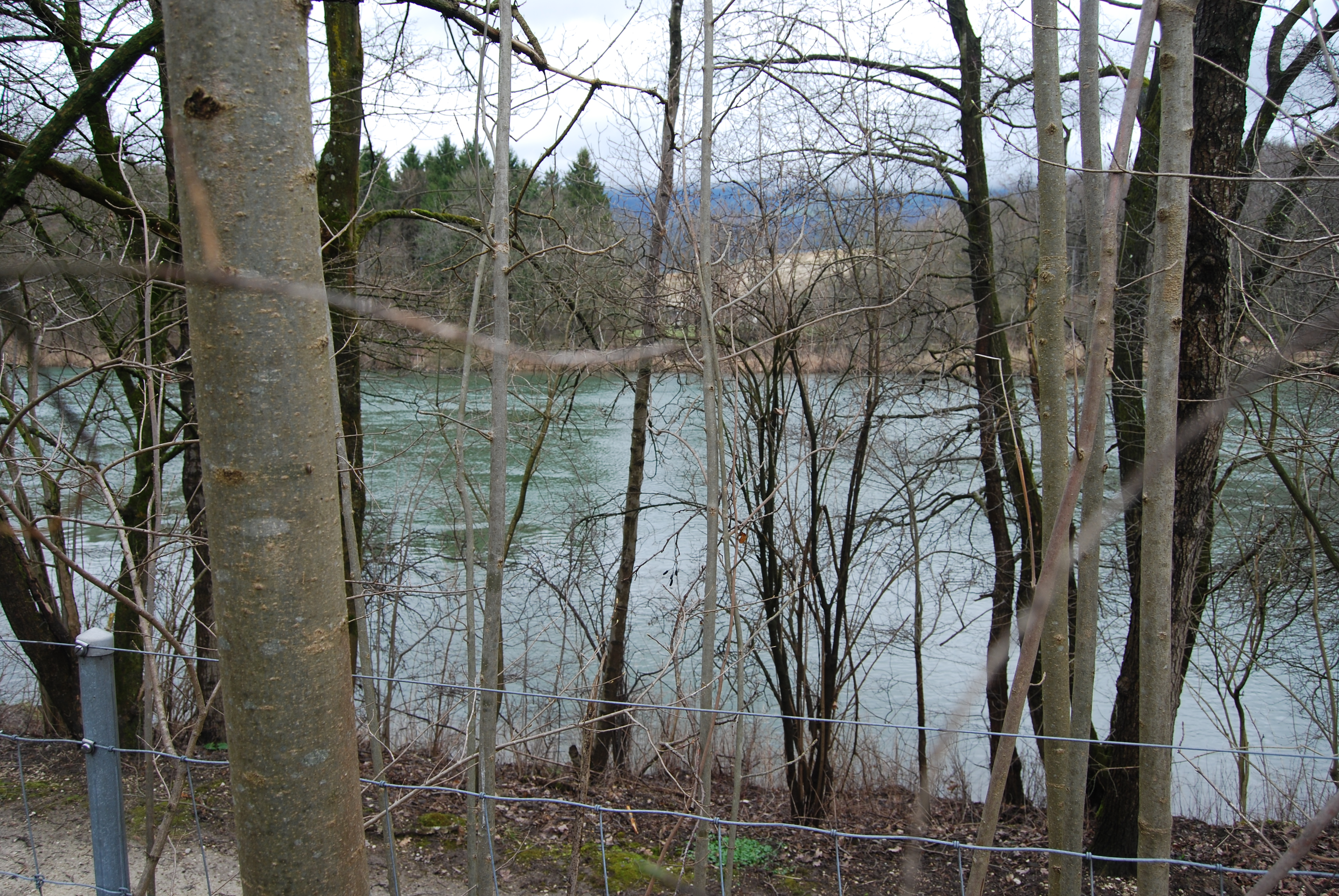
Aare river near Deitingen

Aerial view (1970)

Deitingen has an area, as of 2009, of 7.64 square kilometers (2.95 sq mi). Of this area, 3.98 km^{2} (1.54 sq mi) or 52.1% is used for agricultural purposes, while 1.71 km^{2} (0.66 sq mi) or 22.4% is forested. Of the rest of the land, 1.9 km^{2} (0.73 sq mi) or 24.9% is settled (buildings or roads), 0.03 km^{2} (7.4 acres) or 0.4% is either rivers or lakes and 0.01 km^{2} (2.5 acres) or 0.1% is unproductive land.

Of the built up area, housing and buildings made up 8.8% and transportation infrastructure made up 6.2%. Power and water infrastructure as well as other special developed areas made up 1.7% of the area while parks, green belts and sports fields made up 7.3%. Out of the forested land, all of the forested land area is covered with heavy forests. Of the agricultural land, 44.0% is used for growing crops and 8.0% is pastures. All the water in the municipality is flowing water.

The municipality is located in the Wasseramt district, along the Oesch river near the Aare river and the A1 motorway. It consists of the village of Deitingen and the hamlets of Burg, Wilihof as well as the abandoned settlement of Marchstetten.

== Coat of arms ==
The blazon of the municipal coat of arms is Per fess Argent two Horse Heads Sable issuant addorsed and of the same a Harrow of the first.

== Demographics ==
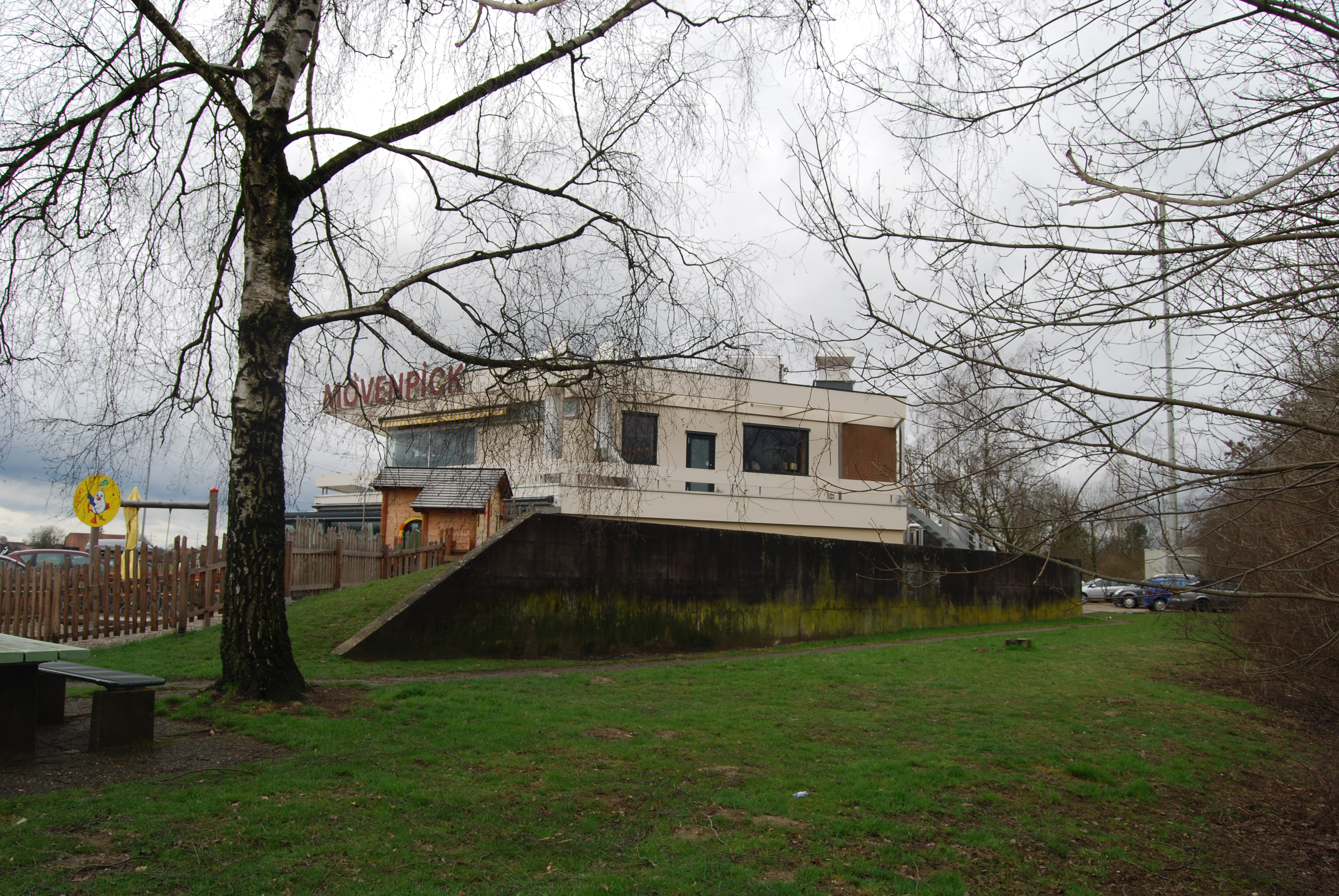
Mövenpick restaurant at the Deitingen Nord highway service area

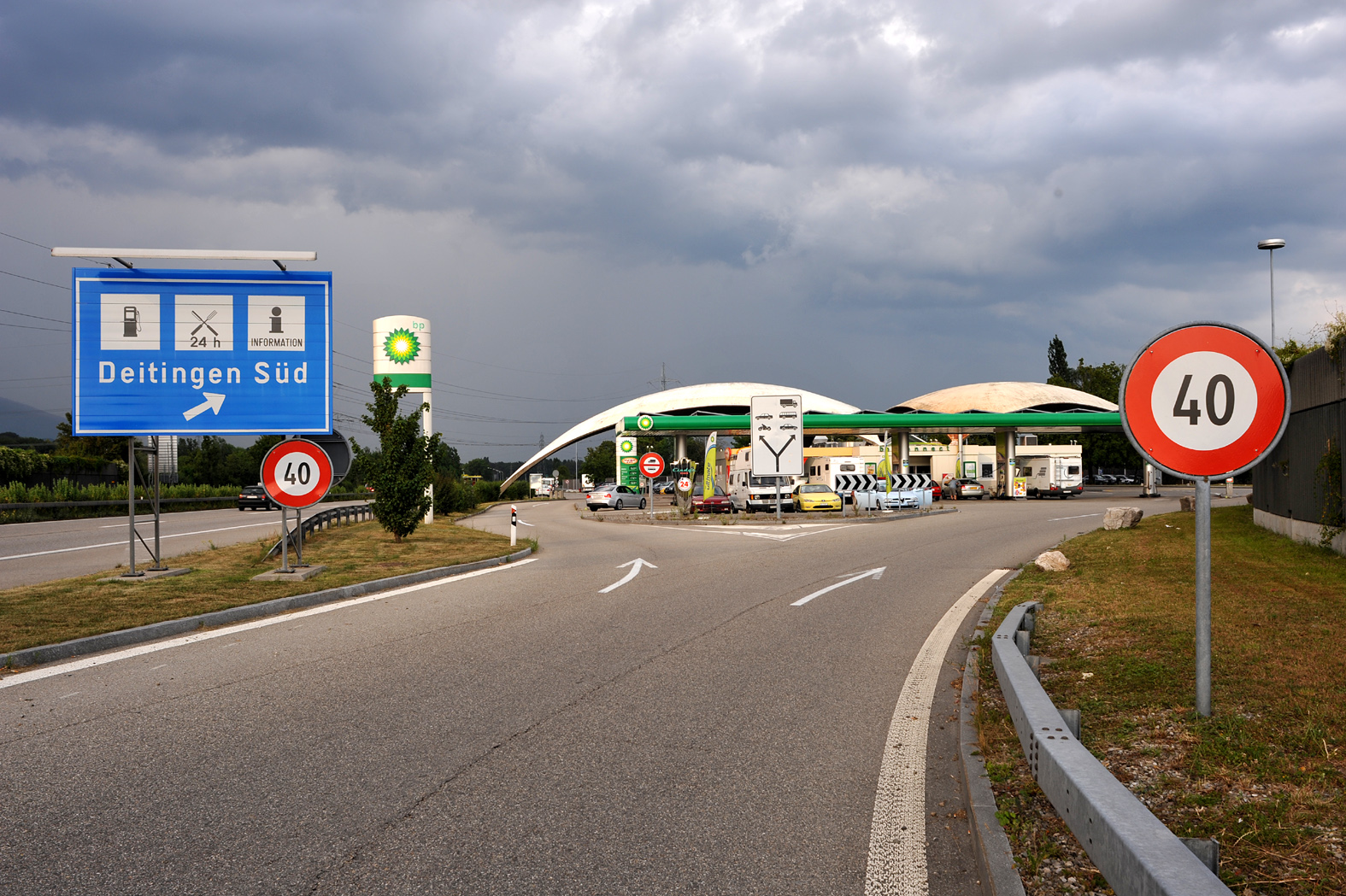
Deitingen Süd highway rest stop

Deitingen has a population (as of December 2020) of 2,227. As of 2008, 9.0% of the population are resident foreign nationals. Over the last 10 years (1999–2009) the population has changed at a rate of 7.5%. It has changed at a rate of 5.4% due to migration and at a rate of 0.8% due to births and deaths.

Most of the population (as of 2000) speaks German (1,893 or 94.1%), with Serbo-Croatian being second most common (25 or 1.2%) and Italian being third (23 or 1.1%). There are 9 people who speak French.

As of 2008, the gender distribution of the population was 49.7% male and 50.3% female. The population was made up of 964 Swiss men (44.8% of the population) and 106 (4.9%) non-Swiss men. There were 995 Swiss women (46.2%) and 89 (4.1%) non-Swiss women. Of the population in the municipality 779 or about 38.7% were born in Deitingen and lived there in 2000. There were 548 or 27.3% who were born in the same canton, while 420 or 20.9% were born somewhere else in Switzerland, and 189 or 9.4% were born outside of Switzerland.

In 2008 there were 15 live births to Swiss citizens and 3 births to non-Swiss citizens, and in same time span there were 13 deaths of Swiss citizens. Ignoring immigration and emigration, the population of Swiss citizens increased by 2 while the foreign population increased by 3. There was 1 Swiss man and 2 Swiss women who emigrated from Switzerland. At the same time, there were 3 non-Swiss men and 1 non-Swiss woman who immigrated from another country to Switzerland. The total Swiss population change in 2008 (from all sources, including moves across municipal borders) was a decrease of 5 and the non-Swiss population increased by 10 people. This represents a population growth rate of 0.2%.

The age distribution, as of 2000, in Deitingen is; 143 children or 7.1% of the population are between 0 and 6 years old and 366 teenagers or 18.2% are between 7 and 19. Of the adult population, 116 people or 5.8% of the population are between 20 and 24 years old. 539 people or 26.8% are between 25 and 44, and 548 people or 27.3% are between 45 and 64. The senior population distribution is 213 people or 10.6% of the population are between 65 and 79 years old and there are 86 people or 4.3% who are over 80.

As of 2000, there were 795 people who were single and never married in the municipality. There were 1,016 married individuals, 114 widows or widowers and 86 individuals who are divorced.

As of 2000, there were 772 private households in the municipality, and an average of 2.6 persons per household. There were 189 households that consist of only one person and 77 households with five or more people. Out of a total of 781 households that answered this question, 24.2% were households made up of just one person and there were 3 adults who lived with their parents. Of the rest of the households, there are 258 married couples without children, 287 married couples with children There were 31 single parents with a child or children. There were 4 households that were made up of unrelated people and 9 households that were made up of some sort of institution or another collective housing.

In 2000 there were 402 single family homes (or 70.5% of the total) out of a total of 570 inhabited buildings. There were 92 multi-family buildings (16.1%), along with 52 multi-purpose buildings that were mostly used for housing (9.1%) and 24 other use buildings (commercial or industrial) that also had some housing (4.2%). Of the single family homes 25 were built before 1919, while 56 were built between 1990 and 2000. The greatest number of single family homes (99) were built between 1946 and 1960.

In 2000 there were 802 apartments in the municipality. The most common apartment size was 4 rooms of which there were 283. There were 9 single room apartments and 351 apartments with five or more rooms. Of these apartments, a total of 759 apartments (94.6% of the total) were permanently occupied, while 24 apartments (3.0%) were seasonally occupied and 19 apartments (2.4%) were empty. As of 2009, the construction rate of new housing units was 9.8 new units per 1000 residents. The vacancy rate for the municipality, in 2010, was 1.1%.

The historical population is given in the following chart:

== Politics ==
In the 2007 federal election the most popular party was the CVP which received 28.92% of the vote. The next three most popular parties were the SVP (25.09%), the FDP (19.64%) and the SP (15.25%). In the federal election, a total of 855 votes were cast, and the voter turnout was 56.1%.

== Economy ==
As of 2010, Deitingen had an unemployment rate of 2.6%. As of 2008, there were 88 people employed in the primary economic sector and about 24 businesses involved in this sector. 325 people were employed in the secondary sector and there were 29 businesses in this sector. 388 people were employed in the tertiary sector, with 61 businesses in this sector. There were 1,055 residents of the municipality who were employed in some capacity, of which females made up 42.7% of the workforce.

In 2008 the total number of full-time equivalent jobs was 683. The number of jobs in the primary sector was 62, of which 45 were in agriculture and 17 were in forestry or lumber production. The number of jobs in the secondary sector was 309 of which 279 or (90.3%) were in manufacturing and 30 (9.7%) were in construction. The number of jobs in the tertiary sector was 312. In the tertiary sector; 125 or 40.1% were in wholesale or retail sales or the repair of motor vehicles, 5 or 1.6% were in the movement and storage of goods, 38 or 12.2% were in a hotel or restaurant, 5 or 1.6% were the insurance or financial industry, 25 or 8.0% were technical professionals or scientists, 26 or 8.3% were in education and 15 or 4.8% were in health care.

In 2000, there were 561 workers who commuted into the municipality and 724 workers who commuted away. The municipality is a net exporter of workers, with about 1.3 workers leaving the municipality for every one entering. Of the working population, 12.5% used public transportation to get to work, and 55.8% used a private car.

== Religion ==
From the 2000 census, 1,133 or 56.3% were Roman Catholic, while 520 or 25.9% belonged to the Swiss Reformed Church. Of the rest of the population, there were 25 members of an Orthodox church (or about 1.24% of the population), there were 2 individuals (or about 0.10% of the population) who belonged to the Christian Catholic Church, and there were 28 individuals (or about 1.39% of the population) who belonged to another Christian church. There were 64 (or about 3.18% of the population) who were Islamic. There were 9 individuals who were Buddhist, 4 individuals who were Hindu and 1 individual who belonged to another church. 160 (or about 7.96% of the population) belonged to no church, are agnostic or atheist, and 65 individuals (or about 3.23% of the population) did not answer the question.

== Education ==
In Deitingen about 812 or (40.4%) of the population have completed non-mandatory upper secondary education, and 203 or (10.1%) have completed additional higher education (either university or a Fachhochschule). Of the 203 who completed tertiary schooling, 73.9% were Swiss men, 20.2% were Swiss women, 3.9% were non-Swiss men.

During the 2010–2011 school year there were a total of 180 students in the Deitingen school system. The education system in the Canton of Solothurn allows young children to attend two years of non-obligatory Kindergarten. During that school year, there were 42 children in kindergarten. The canton's school system requires students to attend six years of primary school, with some of the children attending smaller, specialized classes. In the municipality there were 138 students in primary school. The secondary school program consists of three lower, obligatory years of schooling, followed by three to five years of optional, advanced schools. All the lower secondary students from Deitingen attend their school in a neighboring municipality.

As of 2000, there were 60 students in Deitingen who came from another municipality, while 121 residents attended schools outside the municipality.
