= Günsberg =

- Municipality
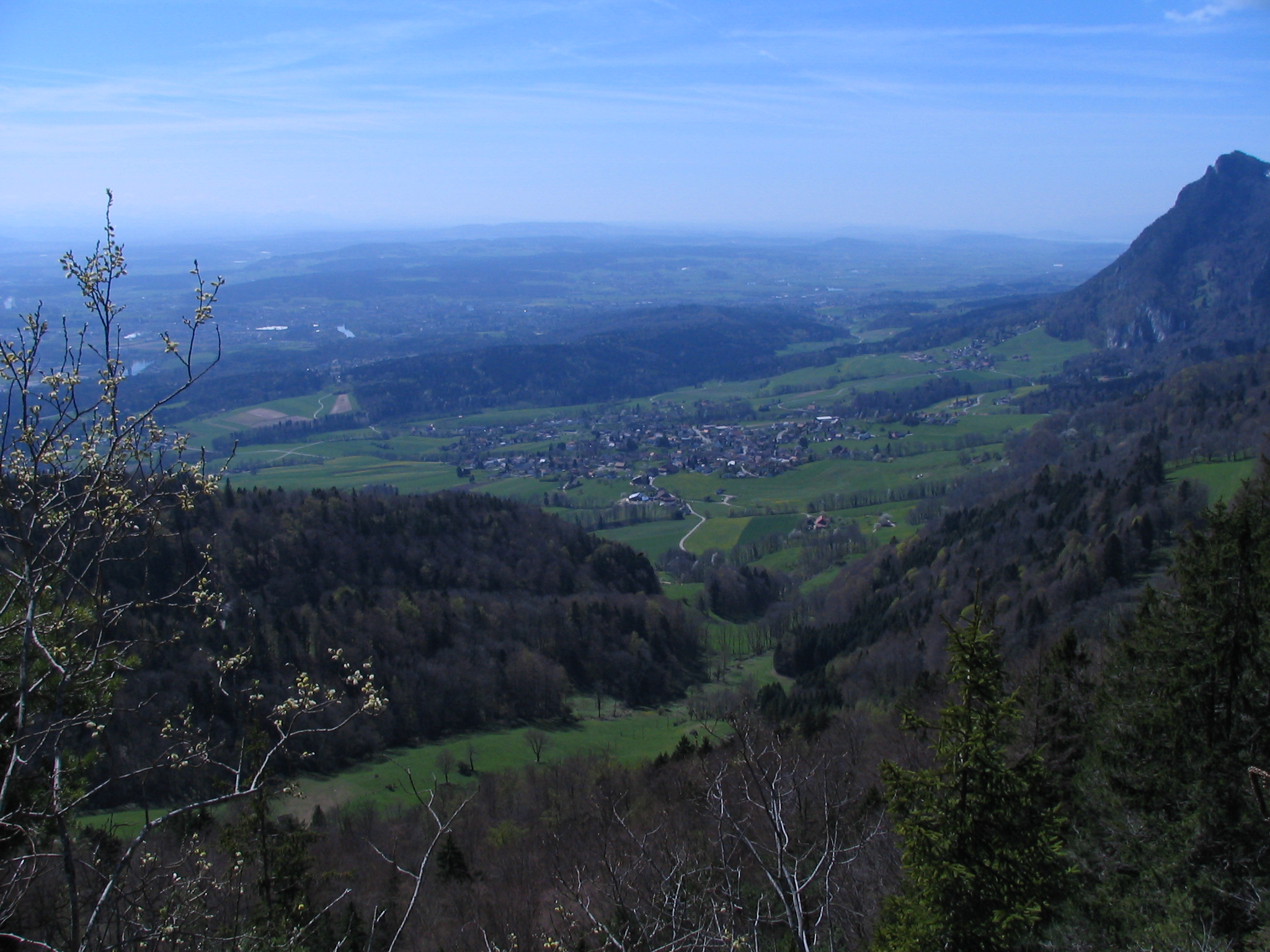

- Flag Coat of arms
- Location of Günsberg
- Location within Switzerland Location within Canton of Solothurn
- Coordinates: 47°15′N 7°35′E
- Country: Switzerland
- Canton: Solothurn
- District: Lebern

Area
  - Total: 5.25 km^{2} (2.03 sq mi)
- Elevation: 624 m (2,047 ft)

Population (December 2020)
  - Total: 1,179
  - Density: 225/km^{2} (582/sq mi)
- Time zone: UTC+01:00 (CET)
  - Summer (DST): UTC+02:00 (CEST)
- Postal code: 4524
- SFOS number: 2547
- ISO 3166 code: CH-SO
- Surrounded by: Attiswil (BE), Balm bei Günsberg, Farnern (BE), Herbetswil, Hubersdorf, Kammersrohr, Niederwil
- Website: guensberg.ch

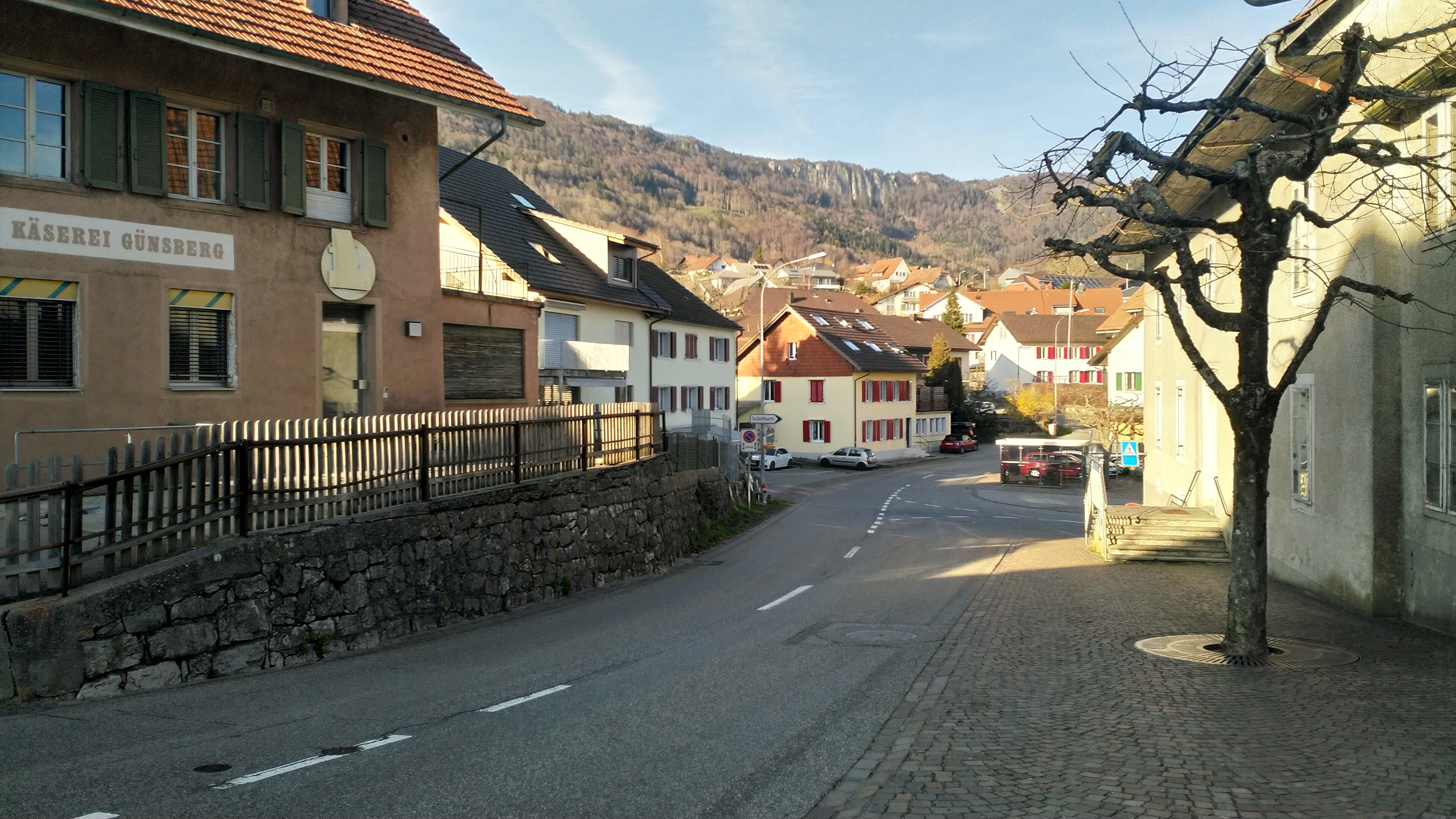
Günsberg village center

Günsberg is a municipality in the district of Lebern in the canton of Solothurn in Switzerland.

== History ==
Günsberg is first mentioned in 1307 as Gunsperch.

== Geography ==
Aerial view (1949)

Günsberg has an area, as of 2009, of 5.25 square kilometers (2.03 sq mi). Of this area, 2.46 km^{2} (0.95 sq mi) or 46.9% is used for agricultural purposes, while 2.23 km^{2} (0.86 sq mi) or 42.5% is forested. Of the rest of the land, 0.54 km^{2} (0.21 sq mi) or 10.3% is settled (buildings or roads) and 0.05 km^{2} (12 acres) or 1.0% is unproductive land.

Of the built up area, housing and buildings made up 7.2% and transportation infrastructure made up 2.5%. Out of the forested land, 38.3% of the total land area is heavily forested and 4.2% is covered with orchards or small clusters of trees. Of the agricultural land, 12.0% is used for growing crops and 23.0% is pastures and 11.2% is used for alpine pastures.

The municipality is located in the Lebern district, in the southern foothills of the Jura Mountains.

== Coat of arms ==
The blazon of the municipal coat of arms is Or a Deer salient Gules over a Mount of 3 Coupeaux Vert.

== Demographics ==
Günsberg has a population (as of December 2020) of 1,179. As of 2008, 7.2% of the population are resident foreign nationals. Over the last 10 years (1999–2009 ) the population has changed at a rate of -1.2%.

Most of the population (as of 2000) speaks German (1,121 or 94.4%), with French being second most common (14 or 1.2%) and French being third (14 or 1.2%). There are 2 people who speak Romansh.

As of 2008, the gender distribution of the population was 50.2% male and 49.8% female. The population was made up of 525 Swiss men (45.7% of the population) and 52 (4.5%) non-Swiss men. There were 527 Swiss women (45.8%) and 46 (4.0%) non-Swiss women. Of the population in the municipality 438 or about 36.9% were born in Günsberg and lived there in 2000. There were 332 or 28.0% who were born in the same canton, while 258 or 21.7% were born somewhere else in Switzerland, and 97 or 8.2% were born outside of Switzerland.

In 2008 there were 9 live births to Swiss citizens and were 11 deaths of Swiss citizens. Ignoring immigration and emigration, the population of Swiss citizens decreased by 2 while the foreign population remained the same. There was 1 Swiss man and 1 Swiss woman who immigrated back to Switzerland. At the same time, there was 1 non-Swiss man and 4 non-Swiss women who immigrated from another country to Switzerland. The total Swiss population change in 2008 (from all sources, including moves across municipal borders) was a decrease of 14 and the non-Swiss population remained the same. This represents a population growth rate of -1.2%.

The age distribution, as of 2000, in Günsberg is; 88 children or 7.4% of the population are between 0 and 6 years old and 187 teenagers or 15.8% are between 7 and 19. Of the adult population, 57 people or 4.8% of the population are between 20 and 24 years old. 378 people or 31.8% are between 25 and 44, and 284 people or 23.9% are between 45 and 64. The senior population distribution is 147 people or 12.4% of the population are between 65 and 79 years old and there are 46 people or 3.9% who are over 80.

As of 2000, there were 471 people who were single and never married in the municipality. There were 609 married individuals, 59 widows or widowers and 48 individuals who are divorced.

As of 2000, there were 470 private households in the municipality, and an average of 2.4 persons per household. There were 106 households that consist of only one person and 27 households with five or more people. Out of a total of 476 households that answered this question, 22.3% were households made up of just one person and there were 7 adults who lived with their parents. Of the rest of the households, there are 173 married couples without children, 153 married couples with children There were 27 single parents with a child or children. There were 4 households that were made up of unrelated people and 6 households that were made up of some sort of institution or another collective housing.

In 2000 there were 253 single family homes (or 70.5% of the total) out of a total of 359 inhabited buildings. There were 57 multi-family buildings (15.9%), along with 38 multi-purpose buildings that were mostly used for housing (10.6%) and 11 other use buildings (commercial or industrial) that also had some housing (3.1%). Of the single family homes 22 were built before 1919, while 42 were built between 1990 and 2000. The greatest number of single family homes (63) were built between 1961 and 1970.

In 2000 there were 492 apartments in the municipality. The most common apartment size was 4 rooms of which there were 136. There were 9 single room apartments and 227 apartments with five or more rooms. Of these apartments, a total of 467 apartments (94.9% of the total) were permanently occupied, while 16 apartments (3.3%) were seasonally occupied and 9 apartments (1.8%) were empty. As of 2009, the construction rate of new housing units was 0 new units per 1000 residents. The vacancy rate for the municipality, in 2010, was 0.76%.

The historical population is given in the following chart:

== Politics ==
In the 2007 federal election the most popular party was the SVP which received 34.03% of the vote. The next three most popular parties were the FDP (20.95%), the SP (19.92%) and the CVP (15.61%). In the federal election, a total of 462 votes were cast, and the voter turnout was 51.8%.

== Economy ==
As of 2010, Günsberg had an unemployment rate of 1.7%. As of 2008, there were 38 people employed in the primary economic sector and about 14 businesses involved in this sector. 41 people were employed in the secondary sector and there were 13 businesses in this sector. 77 people were employed in the tertiary sector, with 24 businesses in this sector. There were 603 residents of the municipality who were employed in some capacity, of which females made up 40.6% of the workforce.

In 2008 the total number of full-time equivalent jobs was 111. The number of jobs in the primary sector was 23, all of which were in agriculture. The number of jobs in the secondary sector was 33 of which 13 or (39.4%) were in manufacturing and 20 (60.6%) were in construction. The number of jobs in the tertiary sector was 55. In the tertiary sector; 10 or 18.2% were in wholesale or retail sales or the repair of motor vehicles, 3 or 5.5% were in the movement and storage of goods, 6 or 10.9% were in a hotel or restaurant, 1 was in the information industry, 4 or 7.3% were technical professionals or scientists, 7 or 12.7% were in education and 4 or 7.3% were in health care.

In 2000, there were 100 workers who commuted into the municipality and 464 workers who commuted away. The municipality is a net exporter of workers, with about 4.6 workers leaving the municipality for every one entering. Of the working population, 12.6% used public transportation to get to work, and 67.2% used a private car.

== Religion ==
From the 2000 census, 551 or 46.4% were Roman Catholic, while 334 or 28.1% belonged to the Swiss Reformed Church. Of the rest of the population, there were 3 members of an Orthodox church (or about 0.25% of the population), there were 8 individuals (or about 0.67% of the population) who belonged to the Christian Catholic Church, and there were 42 individuals (or about 3.54% of the population) who belonged to another Christian church. There were 4 (or about 0.34% of the population) who were Islamic. 188 (or about 15.84% of the population) belonged to no church, are agnostic or atheist, and 57 individuals (or about 4.80% of the population) did not answer the question.

== Education ==
In Günsberg about 486 or (40.9%) of the population have completed non-mandatory upper secondary education, and 169 or (14.2%) have completed additional higher education (either university or a Fachhochschule). Of the 169 who completed tertiary schooling, 63.3% were Swiss men, 25.4% were Swiss women, 5.3% were non-Swiss men and 5.9% were non-Swiss women.

During the 2010–2011 school year there were a total of 111 students in the Günsberg school system. The education system in the Canton of Solothurn allows young children to attend two years of non-obligatory Kindergarten. During that school year, there were 26 children in kindergarten. The canton's school system requires students to attend six years of primary school, with some of the children attending smaller, specialized classes. In the municipality there were 85 students in primary school. The secondary school program consists of three lower, obligatory years of schooling, followed by three to five years of optional, advanced schools. All the lower secondary students from Günsberg attend their school in a neighboring municipality.

As of 2000, there were 32 students in Günsberg who came from another municipality, while 65 residents attended schools outside the municipality.
