= Kammersrohr =

- Municipality
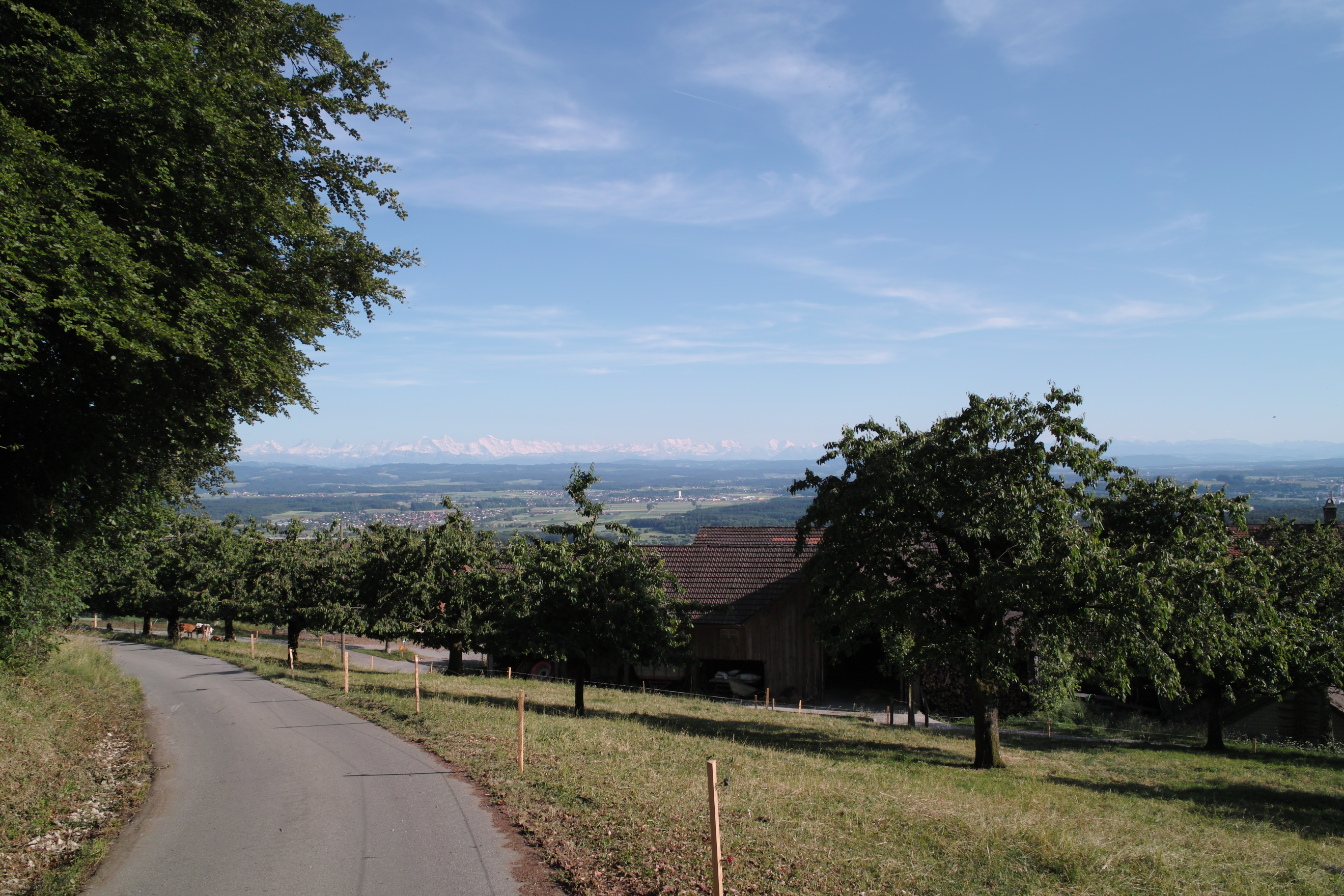

- Flag Coat of arms
- Location of Kammersrohr
- Location within Switzerland Location within Canton of Solothurn
- Coordinates: 47°15′N 7°36′E
- Country: Switzerland
- Canton: Solothurn
- District: Lebern

Area
  - Total: 0.95 km^{2} (0.37 sq mi)
- Elevation: 600 m (2,000 ft)

Population (December 2020)
  - Total: 32
  - Density: 34/km^{2} (87/sq mi)
- Time zone: UTC+01:00 (CET)
  - Summer (DST): UTC+02:00 (CEST)
- Postal code: 4535
- SFOS number: 2549
- ISO 3166 code: CH-SO
- Surrounded by: Attiswil (BE), Günsberg, Hubersdorf
- Website: website missing SFSO statistics

Kammersrohr is a municipality in the district of Lebern in the canton of Solothurn in Switzerland. The municipality, located in the Lebern district, is the smallest municipality in Switzerland, both in population and surface area and is situated on a terrace in the southern foothills of the Jura Mountains.

== History ==
Kammersrohr is first mentioned in 1374 as ze Rore.

== Geography ==
As of 2009, Kammersrohr had an area of 0.95 square kilometers (0.37 sq mi), of which 0.53 km^{2} (0.20 sq mi) (55.8%) is used for agricultural purposes, and 0.38 km^{2} (0.15 sq mi) (40.0%) is forested. Of the rest of the land, 0.03 km^{2} (7.4 acres) or 3.2% is settled with buildings or roads.

Of the built up area, housing and other structures made up 2.1% and transportation infrastructure made up 1.1%. Of the forested land, 37.9% is heavily forested and 2.1% is covered with orchards or small clusters of trees. Of the agricultural land, 29.5% is used for growing crops and 25.3% is in pasture, while 1.1% is used for orchards or vine crops.

== Coat of arms ==
The blazon of the municipal coat of arms is Argent a Mullet Gules between two Reed plants Vert fructed Sable and with two leaves each issuant from a Mount of 3 Coupeaux of the third.

== Demographics ==
Kammersrohr had a population (as of December 2020) of 32. As of 2008, 2.8% of whom were resident foreign nationals. In the 10-year period of 1999–2009, the population changed at a rate of -15.9%.

Most of the population (as of 2000) spoke German (37 or 94.9%), with the rest speaking English (1 or 2.6%) and Polish (1 or 2.6%).

As of 2008, the population's gender distribution was 56.8% male and 43.2% female. The population was made up of 19 Swiss men (51.4% of the population) and 2 (5.4%) non-Swiss men. There were 16 Swiss women (43.2%) and no (0.0%) non-Swiss women. Of the municipal population, 20 (about 51.3%) were born in Kammersrohr and lived there in 2000. There were 9 (23.1%) who were born in the same canton, while 6 (15.4%) were born somewhere else in Switzerland, and 4 (10.3%) were born outside of Switzerland.

In 2008 the total Swiss population change (from all sources, including moves across municipal borders) was a decrease of three people and the non-Swiss population decreased by one person. This represents a population growth rate of -10.0%.

The age distribution as of 2000 in Kammersrohr was 4 children (10.3% of the population) between ages 0 and 6 years, and 11 teenagers (28.2%) were between ages 7 and 19 years. Of the adult population, 2 people (5.1%) were between ages 20 and 24 years, 13 people (33.3%) were between ages 25 and 44, and 7 people (17.9%) were between ages 45 and 64.

As of 2000, 22 people in the municipality were single and never married. There were 14 married individuals, two widows or widowers, and one divorced individual.

As of 2000, the municipality held 11 private households, with an average of 3.5 persons per household. There were two households consisting of one person, and three households with five or more people. From the total of 11 households answering this question, 18.2% were households made up of one person, and one adult lived with their parents. Of the rest of the households, there were three married couples without children, and five married couples with children

In 2000 there were 11 single-family homes (78.6% of the total) out of 14 inhabited buildings. There were three multi-purpose buildings used mostly for housing (21.4%). Of the single-family homes, two were built before 1919 and two were built between 1990 and 2000. The greatest number of single-family homes, four, were built between 1919 and 1945.

In 2000 there were 14 apartments in the municipality. There were four apartments of three rooms each. There were no single room apartments, while eight apartments had five or more rooms. Of the 14 apartments, 11 (78.6%) were permanently occupied, two (14.3%) were seasonally occupied, and one (7.1%) was vacant. As of 2009, the new housing unit construction rate was zero new units per 1,000 residents. The vacancy rate for the municipality, in 2010, was 0%.

The historical population is shown in the following chart:

== Politics ==
In the 2007 federal election the most popular party was the Christian Democratic People's Party of Switzerland (CVP) which received 41.18% of the vote. The next three most popular parties were the Liberals (FDP) (32.03%), the Swiss People's Party (SVP) (9.8%), and the Green Party (9.15%). In the federal election, a total of 22 votes were cast, representing a 53.7% voter turnout.

== Economy ==
As of 2010, Kammersrohr had no unemployment (0%). As of 2008, there were nine people employed in the primary economic sector and about three businesses involved in this sector. No people were employed in the secondary sector and there were no businesses in this sector. Three people were employed in the tertiary sector, with two businesses in this sector. Twenty residents of the municipality were employed in some capacity, of which females made up 30.0% of the workforce.

In 2008 the total number of full-time equivalent jobs was nine. The number of jobs in the primary sector was six, all of which in agriculture. There were no jobs in the secondary sector. There were three jobs in the tertiary sector, of which one (33.3%) was in the sale or repair of motor vehicles, and two (66.7%) were technical professionals or scientists.

In 2000, there were 13 workers who commuted away from the municipality. Of the working population, none (0%) used public transportation to get to work, and seven (55%) used a private car.

== Religion ==
From the 2000 census, 18 people (46.2%) were Roman Catholic, while 14 (35.9%) belonged to the Swiss Reformed Church. Seven people (17.95%) belonged to no church, were agnostic or were atheist.

== Education ==
In Kammersrohr about 13 people (33.3%) had completed non-mandatory upper secondary education, and 11 people (28.2%) had completed additional higher education (either university or a Fachhochschule). Of the 11 people who completed tertiary schooling, 45.5% were Swiss men, and 45.5% were Swiss women.

As of 2000, there were eight students from Kammersrohr who attended schools outside the municipality.
