= Hubersdorf =

- Municipality
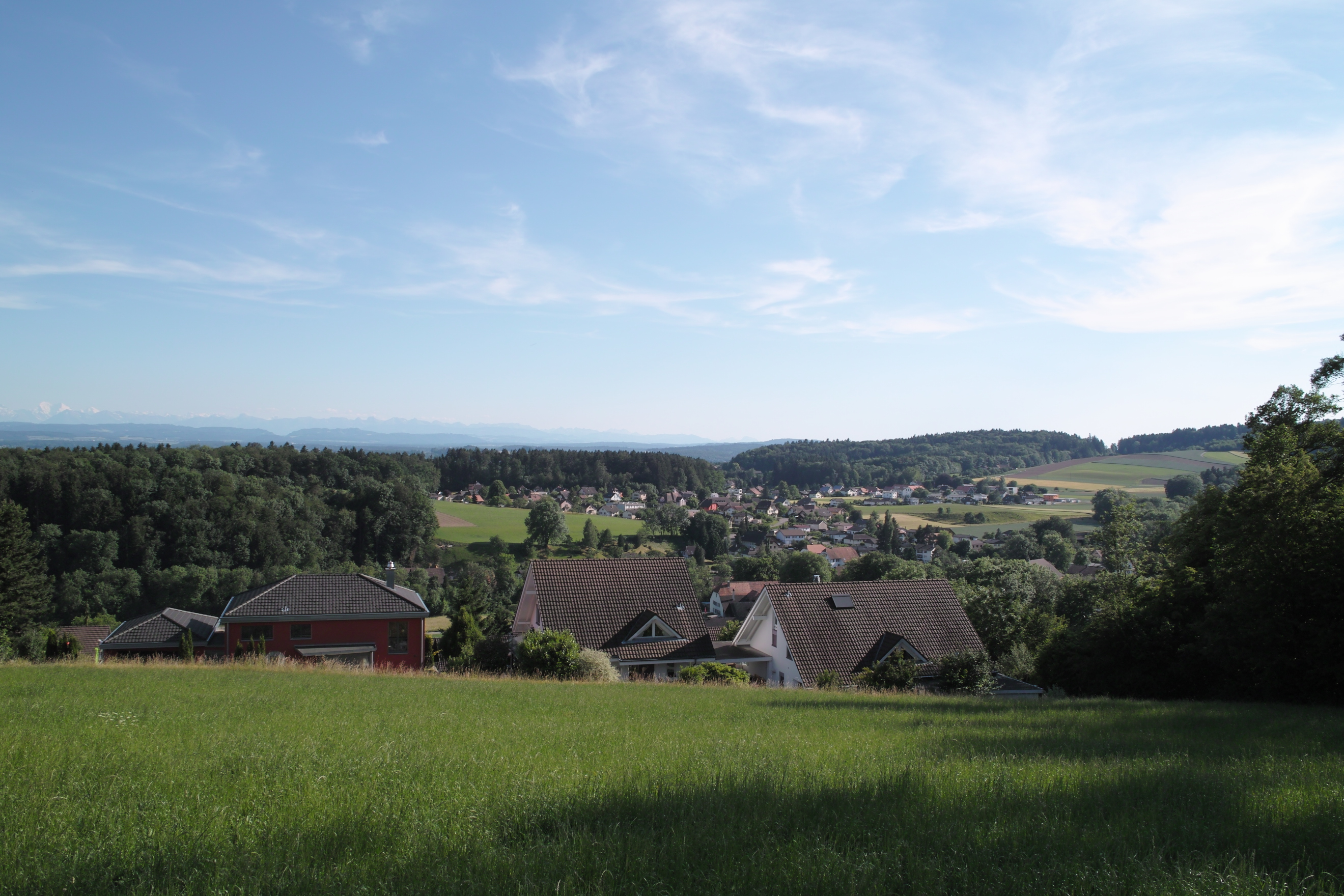

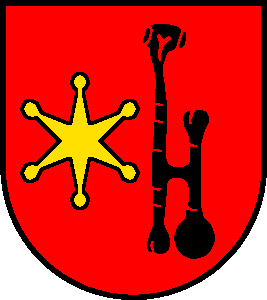
- Coat of arms
- Location of Hubersdorf
- Location within Switzerland Location within Canton of Solothurn
- Coordinates: 47°15′N 7°35′E
- Country: Switzerland
- Canton: Solothurn
- District: Lebern

Area
  - Total: 1.36 km^{2} (0.53 sq mi)
- Elevation: 480 m (1,570 ft)

Population (December 2020)
  - Total: 725
  - Density: 533/km^{2} (1,380/sq mi)
- Time zone: UTC+01:00 (CET)
  - Summer (DST): UTC+02:00 (CEST)
- Postal code: 4535
- SFOS number: 2548
- ISO 3166 code: CH-SO
- Surrounded by: Attiswil (BE), Flumenthal, Günsberg, Kammersrohr, Niederwil, Riedholz
- Website: hubersdorf.ch

Hubersdorf is a municipality in the district of Lebern in the canton of Solothurn in Switzerland.

== History ==
Hubersdorf is first mentioned in 1374 as Huopolstron.

== Geography ==
Hubersdorf has an area, as of 2009, of 1.36 square kilometers (0.53 sq mi). Of this area, 0.72 km^{2} (0.28 sq mi) or 52.9% is used for agricultural purposes, while 0.42 km^{2} (0.16 sq mi) or 30.9% is forested. Of the rest of the land, 0.21 km^{2} (0.081 sq mi) or 15.4% is settled (buildings or roads), 0.01 km^{2} (2.5 acres) or 0.7% is either rivers or lakes.

Of the built up area, housing and buildings made up 12.5% and transportation infrastructure made up 2.2%. Out of the forested land, 26.5% of the total land area is heavily forested and 4.4% is covered with orchards or small clusters of trees. Of the agricultural land, 30.1% is used for growing crops and 22.8% is pastures. All the water in the municipality is flowing water.

The municipality is located in the Lebern district, in a small depression near the Siggern river in the Jura Mountains.

== Coat of arms ==
The blazon of the municipal coat of arms is Gules in dexter a Mullet pommed Or and in sinister a Paring Knife Sable palewise.

== Demographics ==
Hubersdorf has a population (as of December 2020) of 725. As of 2008, 6.3% of the population are resident foreign nationals. Over the last 10 years (1999–2009 ) the population has changed at a rate of 3%.

Most of the population (as of 2000) speaks German (651 or 98.0%), with French being second most common (4 or 0.6%) and Albanian being third (3 or 0.5%).

As of 2008, the gender distribution of the population was 50.3% male and 49.7% female. The population was made up of 323 Swiss men (46.9% of the population) and 23 (3.3%) non-Swiss men. There were 318 Swiss women (46.2%) and 24 (3.5%) non-Swiss women. Of the population in the municipality 198 or about 29.8% were born in Hubersdorf and lived there in 2000. There were 253 or 38.1% who were born in the same canton, while 165 or 24.8% were born somewhere else in Switzerland, and 37 or 5.6% were born outside of Switzerland.

In 2008 there were 8 live births to Swiss citizens and were 5 deaths of Swiss citizens. Ignoring immigration and emigration, the population of Swiss citizens increased by 3 while the foreign population remained the same. There were 3 Swiss men and 1 Swiss woman who emigrated from Switzerland. At the same time, there were 3 non-Swiss men and 1 non-Swiss woman who immigrated from another country to Switzerland. The total Swiss population change in 2008 (from all sources, including moves across municipal borders) was a decrease of 6 and the non-Swiss population increased by 6 people. This represents a population growth rate of 0.0%.

The age distribution, as of 2000, in Hubersdorf is; 53 children or 8.0% of the population are between 0 and 6 years old and 134 teenagers or 20.2% are between 7 and 19. Of the adult population, 42 people or 6.3% of the population are between 20 and 24 years old. 185 people or 27.9% are between 25 and 44, and 175 people or 26.4% are between 45 and 64. The senior population distribution is 61 people or 9.2% of the population are between 65 and 79 years old and there are 14 people or 2.1% who are over 80.

As of 2000, there were 279 people who were single and never married in the municipality. There were 329 married individuals, 29 widows or widowers and 27 individuals who are divorced.

As of 2000, there were 238 private households in the municipality, and an average of 2.8 persons per household. There were 46 households that consist of only one person and 28 households with five or more people. Out of a total of 240 households that answered this question, 19.2% were households made up of just one person and there were 3 adults who lived with their parents. Of the rest of the households, there are 68 married couples without children, 110 married couples with children There were 11 single parents with a child or children.

In 2000 there were 153 single family homes (or 77.3% of the total) out of a total of 198 inhabited buildings. There were 25 multi-family buildings (12.6%), along with 14 multi-purpose buildings that were mostly used for housing (7.1%) and 6 other use buildings (commercial or industrial) that also had some housing (3.0%). Of the single family homes 5 were built before 1919, while 39 were built between 1990 and 2000. The greatest number of single family homes (37) were built between 1981 and 1990.

In 2000 there were 248 apartments in the municipality. The most common apartment size was 5 rooms of which there were 92. There were 9 single room apartments and 156 apartments with five or more rooms. Of these apartments, a total of 236 apartments (95.2% of the total) were permanently occupied, while 5 apartments (2.0%) were seasonally occupied and 7 apartments (2.8%) were empty. As of 2009, the construction rate of new housing units was 17.5 new units per 1000 residents. The vacancy rate for the municipality, in 2010, was 1.77%.

The historical population is given in the following chart:

== Politics ==
In the 2007 federal election the most popular party was the CVP which received 27.02% of the vote. The next three most popular parties were the FDP (22.67%), the SVP (20.72%) and the SP (17.74%). In the federal election, a total of 252 votes were cast, and the voter turnout was 49.1%.

== Economy ==
As of 2010, Hubersdorf had an unemployment rate of 1.9%. As of 2008, there were 12 people employed in the primary economic sector and about 5 businesses involved in this sector. 24 people were employed in the secondary sector and there were 9 businesses in this sector. 61 people were employed in the tertiary sector, with 14 businesses in this sector. There were 366 residents of the municipality who were employed in some capacity, of which females made up 42.9% of the workforce.

In 2008 the total number of full-time equivalent jobs was 67. The number of jobs in the primary sector was 8, of which 7 were in agriculture and 1 was in forestry or lumber production. The number of jobs in the secondary sector was 20 of which 5 or (25.0%) were in manufacturing and 16 (80.0%) were in construction. The number of jobs in the tertiary sector was 39. In the tertiary sector; 2 or 5.1% were in a hotel or restaurant, 2 or 5.1% were in the information industry, 5 or 12.8% were technical professionals or scientists, 25 or 64.1% were in education. In 2000, there were 32 workers who commuted into the municipality and 314 workers who commuted away. The municipality is a net exporter of workers, with about 9.8 workers leaving the municipality for every one entering.

Of the working population, 12% used public transportation to get to work, and 70.2% used a private car.

== Religion ==
From the 2000 census, 309 or 46.5% were Roman Catholic, while 228 or 34.3% belonged to the Swiss Reformed Church. Of the rest of the population, there were 3 individuals (or about 0.45% of the population) who belonged to the Christian Catholic Church, and there were 11 individuals (or about 1.66% of the population) who belonged to another Christian church. There were 7 (or about 1.05% of the population) who were Islamic. 94 (or about 14.16% of the population) belonged to no church, are agnostic or atheist, and 12 individuals (or about 1.81% of the population) did not answer the question.

== Education ==
In Hubersdorf about 293 or (44.1%) of the population have completed non-mandatory upper secondary education, and 73 or (11.0%) have completed additional higher education (either university or a Fachhochschule). Of the 73 who completed tertiary schooling, 89.0% were Swiss men, 8.2% were Swiss women.

During the 2010–2011 school year there were a total of 73 students in the Hubersdorf school system. The education system in the Canton of Solothurn allows young children to attend two years of non-obligatory Kindergarten. During that school year, there were 20 children in kindergarten. The canton's school system requires students to attend six years of primary school, with some of the children attending smaller, specialized classes. In the municipality there were 53 students in primary school. The secondary school program consists of three lower, obligatory years of schooling, followed by three to five years of optional, advanced schools. All the lower secondary students from Hubersdorf attend their school in a neighboring municipality.

As of 2000, there were 122 students in Hubersdorf who came from another municipality, while 36 residents attended schools outside the municipality.
