= Flumenthal =

- Municipality
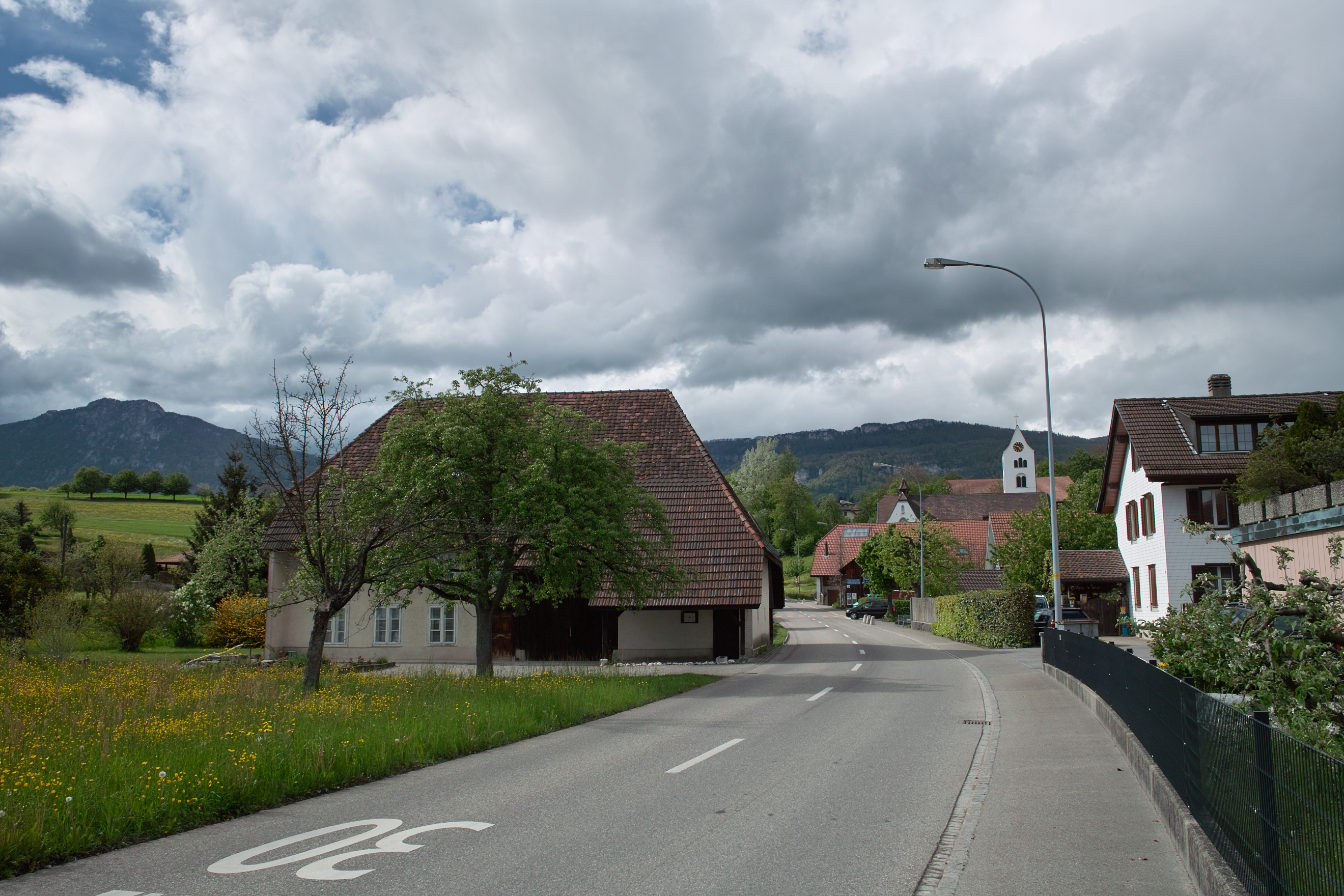

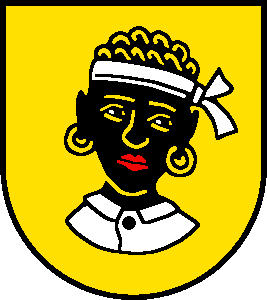
- Coat of arms
- Location of Flumenthal
- Location within Switzerland Location within Canton of Solothurn
- Coordinates: 47°14′N 7°36′E
- Country: Switzerland
- Canton: Solothurn
- District: Lebern

Area
  - Total: 3.11 km^{2} (1.20 sq mi)
- Elevation: 430 m (1,410 ft)

Population (December 2020)
  - Total: 1,052
  - Density: 338/km^{2} (876/sq mi)
- Time zone: UTC+01:00 (CET)
  - Summer (DST): UTC+02:00 (CEST)
- Postal code: 4534
- SFOS number: 2545
- ISO 3166 code: CH-SO
- Surrounded by: Attiswil (BE), Deitingen, Hubersdorf, Riedholz, Wangen an der Aare (BE)
- Website: www.flumenthal.ch

Flumenthal is a municipality in the district of Lebern in the canton of Solothurn in Switzerland.

== Flumenthal dam ==
The Flumenthal dam was erected in the 1970s on river Aare during the Second Jura water correction in order to regulate the waters of the Seeland's three lakes hydrological system further downstream of the regulating dam Port.

== Geography ==
Aerial view (1958)

Flumenthal has an area, as of 2009, of 3.11 square kilometers (1.20 sq mi). Of this area, 1.52 km^{2} (0.59 sq mi) or 48.9% is used for agricultural purposes, while 0.77 km^{2} (0.30 sq mi) or 24.8% is forested. Of the rest of the land, 0.61 km^{2} (0.24 sq mi) or 19.6% is settled (buildings or roads), 0.17 km^{2} (0.066 sq mi) or 5.5% is either rivers or lakes and 0.02 km^{2} (4.9 acres) or 0.6% is unproductive land.

Of the built up area, industrial buildings made up 1.3% of the total area while housing and buildings made up 7.1% and transportation infrastructure made up 6.8%. while parks, green belts and sports fields made up 3.5%. Out of the forested land, 21.9% of the total land area is heavily forested and 2.9% is covered with orchards or small clusters of trees. Of the agricultural land, 33.8% is used for growing crops and 14.5% is pastures. All the water in the municipality is flowing water.

The municipality is located in the Lebern district. The northern part of Flumenthal lies on a gravel terrace that was built up by the Aare river, while the southern part lies along the river.

== Coat of arms ==
The blazon of the municipal coat of arms is Gold a Moor's head with Headband and Collar Silver and Lips Gules.

== Demographics ==
Flumenthal has a population (as of December 2020) of 1,052. As of 2008, 8.5% of the population are resident foreign nationals. Over the last 10 years (1999–2009 ) the population has changed at a rate of -4%.

Most of the population (as of 2000) speaks German (956 or 95.0%), with Albanian being second most common (11 or 1.1%) and Italian being third (10 or 1.0%). There are 2 people who speak French and 1 person who speaks Romansh.

As of 2008, the gender distribution of the population was 50.1% male and 49.9% female. The population was made up of 446 Swiss men (45.2% of the population) and 48 (4.9%) non-Swiss men. There were 458 Swiss women (46.4%) and 35 (3.5%) non-Swiss women. Of the population in the municipality 306 or about 30.4% were born in Flumenthal and lived there in 2000. There were 352 or 35.0% who were born in the same canton, while 227 or 22.6% were born somewhere else in Switzerland, and 90 or 8.9% were born outside of Switzerland.

In 2008 there were 4 live births to Swiss citizens and were 7 deaths of Swiss citizens. Ignoring immigration and emigration, the population of Swiss citizens decreased by 3 while the foreign population remained the same. There was 1 Swiss man who emigrated from Switzerland. At the same time, there was 1 non-Swiss man who immigrated from another country to Switzerland. The total Swiss population change in 2008 (from all sources, including moves across municipal borders) was a decrease of 18 and the non-Swiss population increased by 8 people. This represents a population growth rate of -1.0%.

The age distribution, as of 2000, in Flumenthal is; 77 children or 7.7% of the population are between 0 and 6 years old and 152 teenagers or 15.1% are between 7 and 19. Of the adult population, 57 people or 5.7% of the population are between 20 and 24 years old. 340 people or 33.8% are between 25 and 44, and 253 people or 25.1% are between 45 and 64. The senior population distribution is 102 people or 10.1% of the population are between 65 and 79 years old and there are 25 people or 2.5% who are over 80.

As of 2000, there were 400 people who were single and never married in the municipality. There were 502 married individuals, 54 widows or widowers and 50 individuals who are divorced.

As of 2000, there were 428 private households in the municipality, and an average of 2.3 persons per household. There were 125 households that consist of only one person and 23 households with five or more people. Out of a total of 438 households that answered this question, 28.5% were households made up of just one person and there were 2 adults who lived with their parents. Of the rest of the households, there are 131 married couples without children, 136 married couples with children There were 26 single parents with a child or children. There were 8 households that were made up of unrelated people and 10 households that were made up of some sort of institution or another collective housing.

In 2000 there were 168 single family homes (or 66.4% of the total) out of a total of 253 inhabited buildings. There were 50 multi-family buildings (19.8%), along with 30 multi-purpose buildings that were mostly used for housing (11.9%) and 5 other use buildings (commercial or industrial) that also had some housing (2.0%). Of the single family homes 15 were built before 1919, while 22 were built between 1990 and 2000. The greatest number of single family homes (34) were built between 1981 and 1990.

In 2000 there were 443 apartments in the municipality. The most common apartment size was 4 rooms of which there were 169. There were 6 single room apartments and 160 apartments with five or more rooms. Of these apartments, a total of 408 apartments (92.1% of the total) were permanently occupied, while 27 apartments (6.1%) were seasonally occupied and 8 apartments (1.8%) were empty. As of 2009, the construction rate of new housing units was 0 new units per 1000 residents. The vacancy rate for the municipality, in 2010, was 0.65%.

The historical population is given in the following chart:

== Heritage sites of national significance ==
The Parish Church of St. Peter and Paul is listed as a Swiss heritage site of national significance.

== Politics ==
In the 2007 federal election the most popular party was the SVP which received 26.43% of the vote. The next three most popular parties were the SP (22.39%), the FDP (21.46%) and the CVP (19.07%). In the federal election, a total of 327 votes were cast, and the voter turnout was 41.7%.

== Economy ==
As of 2010, Flumenthal had an unemployment rate of 2.7%. As of 2008, there were 23 people employed in the primary economic sector and about 8 businesses involved in this sector. 67 people were employed in the secondary sector and there were 14 businesses in this sector. 265 people were employed in the tertiary sector, with 28 businesses in this sector. There were 585 residents of the municipality who were employed in some capacity, of which females made up 42.7% of the workforce.

In 2008 the total number of full-time equivalent jobs was 259. The number of jobs in the primary sector was 15, all of which were in agriculture. The number of jobs in the secondary sector was 61 of which 17 or (27.9%) were in manufacturing and 45 (73.8%) were in construction. The number of jobs in the tertiary sector was 183. In the tertiary sector; 6 or 3.3% were in wholesale or retail sales or the repair of motor vehicles, 5 or 2.7% were in the movement and storage of goods, 34 or 18.6% were in a hotel or restaurant, 3 or 1.6% were in the information industry, 3 or 1.6% were the insurance or financial industry, 10 or 5.5% were technical professionals or scientists, 6 or 3.3% were in education and 113 or 61.7% were in health care.

In 2000, there were 65 workers who commuted into the municipality and 503 workers who commuted away. The municipality is a net exporter of workers, with about 7.7 workers leaving the municipality for every one entering. Of the working population, 13.2% used public transportation to get to work, and 68% used a private car.

== Religion ==
From the 2000 census, 396 or 39.4% were Roman Catholic, while 349 or 34.7% belonged to the Swiss Reformed Church. Of the rest of the population, there were 7 members of an Orthodox church (or about 0.70% of the population), there were 5 individuals (or about 0.50% of the population) who belonged to the Christian Catholic Church, and there were 21 individuals (or about 2.09% of the population) who belonged to another Christian church. There were 20 (or about 1.99% of the population) who were Islamic. There were 2 individuals who were Buddhist. 183 (or about 18.19% of the population) belonged to no church, are agnostic or atheist, and 23 individuals (or about 2.29% of the population) did not answer the question.

== Education ==
In Flumenthal about 447 or (44.4%) of the population have completed non-mandatory upper secondary education, and 83 or (8.3%) have completed additional higher education (either university or a Fachhochschule). Of the 83 who completed tertiary schooling, 75.9% were Swiss men, 18.1% were Swiss women.

During the 2010-2011 school year there were a total of 94 students in the Flumenthal school system. The education system in the Canton of Solothurn allows young children to attend two years of non-obligatory Kindergarten. During that school year, there were 18 children in kindergarten. The canton's school system requires students to attend six years of primary school, with some of the children attending smaller, specialized classes. In the municipality there were 76 students in primary school. The secondary school program consists of three lower, obligatory years of schooling, followed by three to five years of optional, advanced schools. All the lower secondary students from Flumenthal attend their school in a neighboring municipality.

As of 2000, there were 11 students in Flumenthal who came from another municipality, while 55 residents attended schools outside the municipality.
