= Rüttenen =

- Municipality
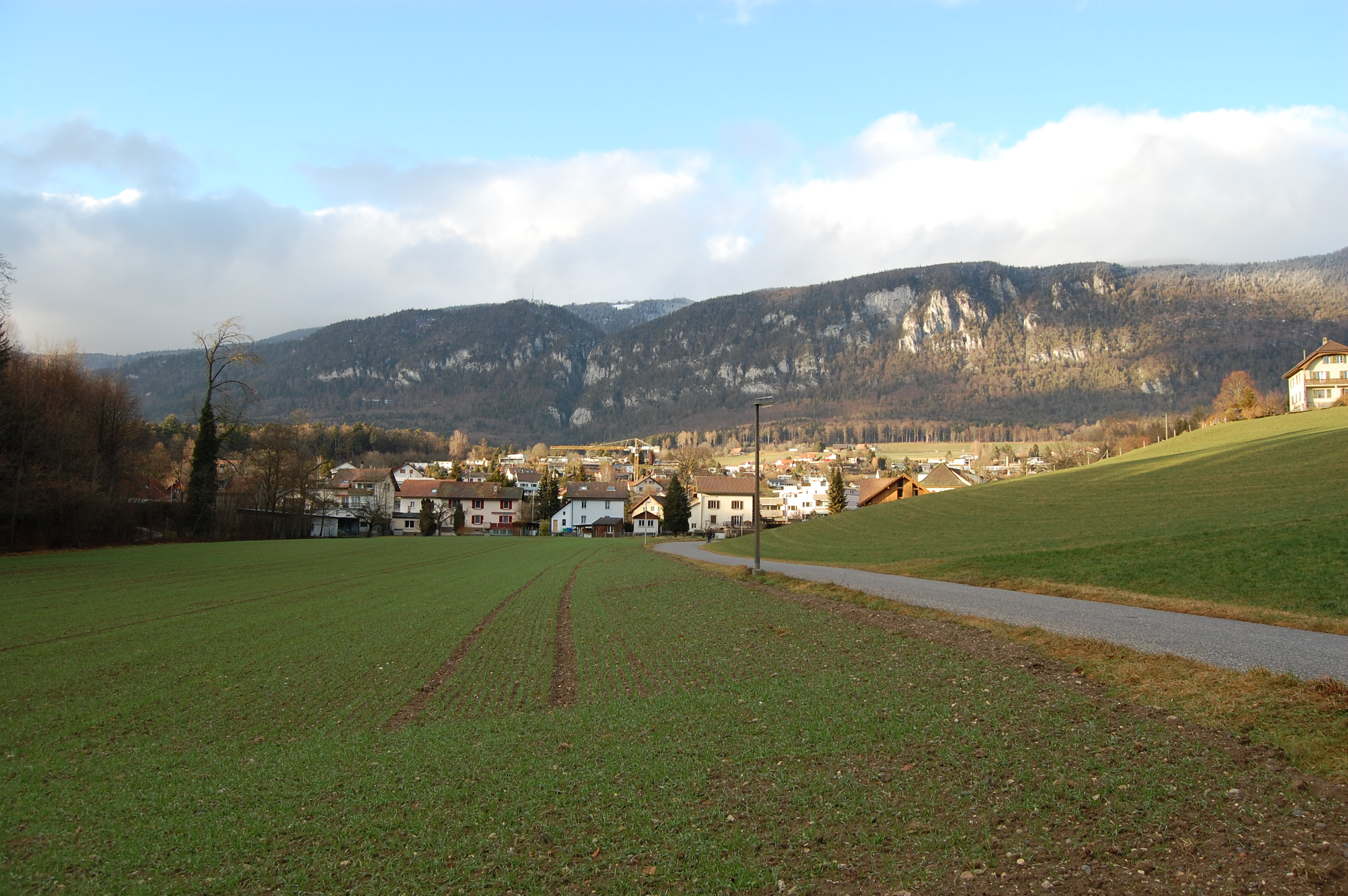

- Coat of arms
- Location of Rüttenen
- Location within Switzerland Location within Canton of Solothurn
- Coordinates: 47°14′N 7°32′E
- Country: Switzerland
- Canton: Solothurn
- District: Lebern

Area
  - Total: 8.77 km^{2} (3.39 sq mi)
- Elevation: 516 m (1,693 ft)

Population (December 2020)
  - Total: 1,483
  - Density: 169/km^{2} (438/sq mi)
- Time zone: UTC+01:00 (CET)
  - Summer (DST): UTC+02:00 (CEST)
- Postal code: 4522
- SFOS number: 2555
- ISO 3166 code: CH-SO
- Surrounded by: Balm bei Günsberg, Feldbrunnen-St. Niklaus, Langendorf, Niederwil, Oberdorf, Riedholz, Solothurn, Welschenrohr
- Website: ruettenen.ch

Rüttenen is a municipality in the district of Lebern in the canton of Solothurn in Switzerland.

== History ==
Rüttenen is first mentioned in 1474 as Rüti. After 1497 it was known as die rutinen.

== Geography ==
Rüttenen has an area, as of 2009, of 8.77 square kilometers (3.39 sq mi). Of this area, 1.95 km^{2} (0.75 sq mi) or 22.2% is used for agricultural purposes, while 6.04 km^{2} (2.33 sq mi) or 68.9% is forested. Of the rest of the land, 0.69 km^{2} (0.27 sq mi) or 7.9% is settled (buildings or roads), 0.01 km^{2} (2.5 acres) or 0.1% is either rivers or lakes and 0.11 km^{2} (27 acres) or 1.3% is unproductive land.

Of the built up area, housing and buildings made up 4.6% and transportation infrastructure made up 2.3%. Out of the forested land, 67.7% of the total land area is heavily forested and 1.1% is covered with orchards or small clusters of trees. Of the agricultural land, 13.6% is used for growing crops and 5.0% is pastures and 3.0% is used for alpine pastures. All the water in the municipality is flowing water.

The municipality is located in the Lebern district, at the foot of the Weissenstein mountains. It consists of the village of Rüttenen and the hamlets of Widlisbach, Oberrüttenen, Galmis, Falleren, Brüggmoos, Kreuzen and Steingrubenquartier which is a suburb of Solothurn.

== Coat of arms ==
The blazon of the municipal coat of arms is Azure a Digging Hoe Argent issuant from a Mount of 3 Coupeaux Or.

== Demographics ==
Rüttenen has a population (as of December 2020) of 1,483. As of 2008, 5.2% of the population are resident foreign nationals. Over the last 10 years (1999–2009 ) the population has changed at a rate of 4.3%.

Most of the population (as of 2000) speaks German (1,352 or 95.9%), with French being second most common (13 or 0.9%) and English being third (7 or 0.5%). There is 1 person who speaks Romansh.

As of 2008, the gender distribution of the population was 48.8% male and 51.2% female. The population was made up of 668 Swiss men (46.2% of the population) and 37 (2.6%) non-Swiss men. There were 693 Swiss women (47.9%) and 48 (3.3%) non-Swiss women. Of the population in the municipality 426 or about 30.2% were born in Rüttenen and lived there in 2000. There were 490 or 34.8% who were born in the same canton, while 332 or 23.5% were born somewhere else in Switzerland, and 126 or 8.9% were born outside of Switzerland.

In 2008 there were 11 live births to Swiss citizens and 1 birth to non-Swiss citizens, and in same time span there were 9 deaths of Swiss citizens. Ignoring immigration and emigration, the population of Swiss citizens increased by 2 while the foreign population increased by 1. There were 4 non-Swiss men and 4 non-Swiss women who immigrated from another country to Switzerland. The total Swiss population change in 2008 (from all sources, including moves across municipal borders) was an increase of 15 and the non-Swiss population increased by 11 people. This represents a population growth rate of 1.9%.

The age distribution, as of 2000, in Rüttenen is; 90 children or 6.4% of the population are between 0 and 6 years old and 218 teenagers or 15.5% are between 7 and 19. Of the adult population, 80 people or 5.7% of the population are between 20 and 24 years old. 378 people or 26.8% are between 25 and 44, and 421 people or 29.9% are between 45 and 64. The senior population distribution is 165 people or 11.7% of the population are between 65 and 79 years old and there are 58 people or 4.1% who are over 80.

As of 2000, there were 563 people who were single and never married in the municipality. There were 702 married individuals, 78 widows or widowers and 67 individuals who are divorced.

As of 2000, there were 606 private households in the municipality, and an average of 2.3 persons per household. There were 193 households that consist of only one person and 40 households with five or more people. Out of a total of 619 households that answered this question, 31.2% were households made up of just one person and there were 5 adults who lived with their parents. Of the rest of the households, there are 194 married couples without children, 174 married couples with children There were 28 single parents with a child or children. There were 12 households that were made up of unrelated people and 13 households that were made up of some sort of institution or another collective housing.

In 2000 there were 266 single family homes (or 65.0% of the total) out of a total of 409 inhabited buildings. There were 82 multi-family buildings (20.0%), along with 43 multi-purpose buildings that were mostly used for housing (10.5%) and 18 other use buildings (commercial or industrial) that also had some housing (4.4%). Of the single family homes 35 were built before 1919, while 49 were built between 1990 and 2000. The greatest number of single family homes (54) were built between 1971 and 1980.

In 2000 there were 640 apartments in the municipality. The most common apartment size was 4 rooms of which there were 170. There were 23 single room apartments and 242 apartments with five or more rooms. Of these apartments, a total of 586 apartments (91.6% of the total) were permanently occupied, while 29 apartments (4.5%) were seasonally occupied and 25 apartments (3.9%) were empty. As of 2009, the construction rate of new housing units was 10.4 new units per 1000 residents. The vacancy rate for the municipality, in 2010, was 0.43%.

The historical population is given in the following chart:

== Heritage sites of national significance ==
The Hermitage and pilgrimage site at Einsiedelei 4 is listed as a Swiss heritage site of national significance. The entire complex around the Hermitage and the area around Kreuzen is part of the Inventory of Swiss Heritage Sites.

== Politics ==
In the 2007 federal election the most popular parties were the CVP and the SVP both of which received 20.98% of the vote. The next two most popular parties were the SP (20.72%) and the FDP (20.48%). In the federal election, a total of 682 votes were cast, and the voter turnout was 60.6%.

== Economy ==
As of 2010, Rüttenen had an unemployment rate of 2.1%. As of 2008, there were 24 people employed in the primary economic sector and about 11 businesses involved in this sector. 66 people were employed in the secondary sector and there were 19 businesses in this sector. 192 people were employed in the tertiary sector, with 37 businesses in this sector. There were 780 residents of the municipality who were employed in some capacity, of which females made up 45.1% of the workforce.

In 2008 the total number of full-time equivalent jobs was 206. The number of jobs in the primary sector was 17, all of which were in agriculture. The number of jobs in the secondary sector was 65 of which 39 or (60.0%) were in manufacturing and 26 (40.0%) were in construction. The number of jobs in the tertiary sector was 124. In the tertiary sector; 18 or 14.5% were in wholesale or retail sales or the repair of motor vehicles, 8 or 6.5% were in the movement and storage of goods, 26 or 21.0% were in a hotel or restaurant, 1 was in the information industry, 11 or 8.9% were technical professionals or scientists, 7 or 5.6% were in education and 47 or 37.9% were in health care.

In 2000, there were 73 workers who commuted into the municipality and 626 workers who commuted away. The municipality is a net exporter of workers, with about 8.6 workers leaving the municipality for every one entering. Of the working population, 13.7% used public transportation to get to work, and 60.9% used a private car.

== Religion ==
From the 2000 census, 570 or 40.4% were Roman Catholic, while 421 or 29.9% belonged to the Swiss Reformed Church. Of the rest of the population, there were 10 members of an Orthodox church (or about 0.71% of the population), there were 29 individuals (or about 2.06% of the population) who belonged to the Christian Catholic Church, and there were 40 individuals (or about 2.84% of the population) who belonged to another Christian church. There were 7 (or about 0.50% of the population) who were Islamic. There were 3 individuals who were Buddhist and 2 individuals who were Hindu. 299 (or about 21.21% of the population) belonged to no church, are agnostic or atheist, and 29 individuals (or about 2.06% of the population) did not answer the question.

== Education ==
In Rüttenen about 588 or (41.7%) of the population have completed non-mandatory upper secondary education, and 243 or (17.2%) have completed additional higher education (either university or a Fachhochschule). Of the 243 who completed tertiary schooling, 68.7% were Swiss men, 23.0% were Swiss women, 4.1% were non-Swiss men and 4.1% were non-Swiss women.

During the 2010–2011 school year there were a total of 89 students in the Rüttenen school system. The education system in the Canton of Solothurn allows young children to attend two years of non-obligatory Kindergarten. During that school year, there were 25 children in kindergarten. The canton's school system requires students to attend six years of primary school, with some of the children attending smaller, specialized classes. In the municipality there were 64 students in primary school. The secondary school program consists of three lower, obligatory years of schooling, followed by three to five years of optional, advanced schools. All the lower secondary students from Rüttenen attend their school in a neighboring municipality.

As of 2000, there were 161 students from Rüttenen who attended schools outside the municipality.
