= Niederwil, Solothurn =

Niederwil
- Former municipality
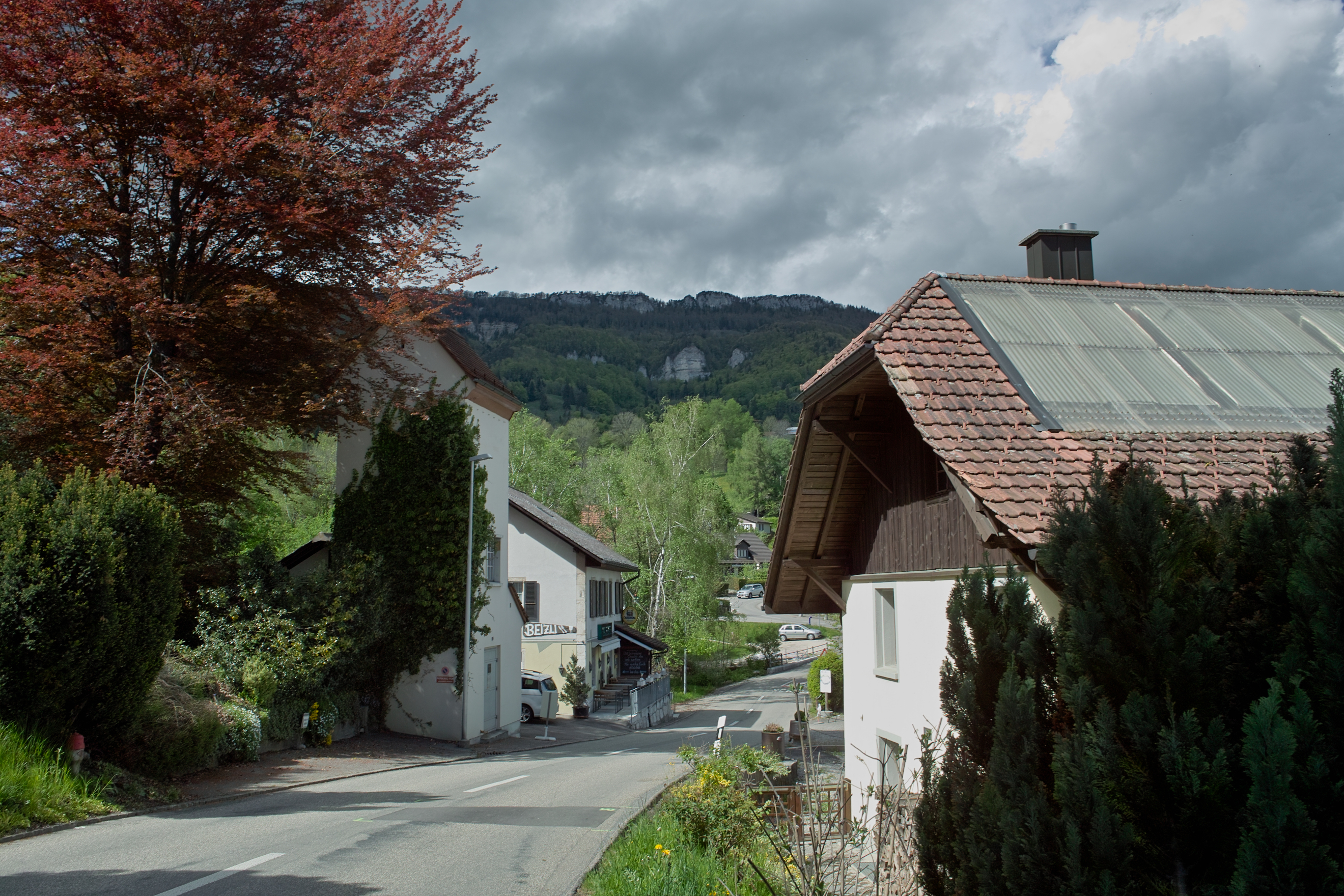

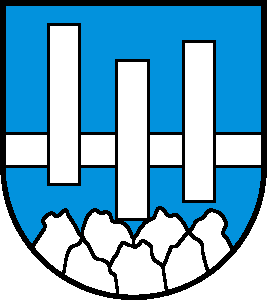
- Coat of arms
- Location of Niederwil
- Location within Switzerland Location within Canton of Solothurn
- Coordinates: 47°15′N 7°34′E
- Country: Switzerland
- Canton: Solothurn
- District: Lebern

Area
  - Total: 2.28 km^{2} (0.88 sq mi)
- Elevation: 545 m (1,788 ft)

Population (December 2020)
  - Total: 395
  - Density: 173/km^{2} (449/sq mi)
- Time zone: UTC+01:00 (CET)
  - Summer (DST): UTC+02:00 (CEST)
- Postal code: 4523
- SFOS number: 2552
- ISO 3166 code: CH-SO
- Surrounded by: Balm bei Günsberg, Günsberg, Hubersdorf, Riedholz, Rüttenen
- Website: niederwil-so.ch

Niederwil was a municipality in the district of Lebern in the canton of Solothurn in Switzerland. In 2011 Niederwil merged into Riedholz.

== History ==
Niederwil is first mentioned in 1292 as Lomolzwile.

== Geography ==
Niederwil has an area, as of 2009, of 2.28 square kilometers (0.88 sq mi). Of this area, 1.24 km^{2} (0.48 sq mi) or 54.4% is used for agricultural purposes, while 0.83 km^{2} (0.32 sq mi) or 36.4% is forested. Of the rest of the land, 0.21 km^{2} (0.081 sq mi) or 9.2% is settled (buildings or roads). Of the built up area, housing and buildings made up 5.3% and transportation infrastructure made up 2.6%. Out of the forested land, 33.8% of the total land area is heavily forested and 2.6% is covered with orchards or small clusters of trees. Of the agricultural land, 28.1% is used for growing crops and 23.7% is pastures, while 2.6% is used for orchards or vine crops.

The village is located in the Lebern district, in a small trough near the Siggern.

== Coat of arms ==
The blazon of the municipal coat of arms is Azure a Gypsum-pounder, consisting of a Crankshaft, with three Rammers over seven calcareous Stones all Argent.

== Demographics ==
Niederwil has a population (As of December 2010) of 395. Over the last 10 years (1999-2009 ) the population has changed at a rate of 0%. Most of the population (as of 2000) speaks German (334 or 94.4%), with Albanian being second most common (7 or 2.0%) and Italian being third (3 or 0.8%). There is 1 person who speaks French.

As of 2008, the gender distribution of the population was 48.8% male and 51.2% female. The population was made up of 186 Swiss men (45.8% of the population) and 12 (3.0%) non-Swiss men. There were 195 Swiss women (48.0%) and 13 (3.2%) non-Swiss women. Of the population in the village 119 or about 33.6% were born in Niederwil and lived there in 2000. There were 127 or 35.9% who were born in the same canton, while 67 or 18.9% were born somewhere else in Switzerland, and 38 or 10.7% were born outside of Switzerland.

In 2008 there were 3 live births to Swiss citizens and were 3 deaths of Swiss citizens. Ignoring immigration and emigration, the population of Swiss citizens remained the same while the foreign population remained the same. There was 1 Swiss man who immigrated back to Switzerland. At the same time, there was 1 non-Swiss man and 4 non-Swiss women who immigrated from another country to Switzerland. The total Swiss population change in 2008 (from all sources, including moves across municipal borders) was an increase of 9 and the non-Swiss population increased by 6 people. This represents a population growth rate of 3.9%.

The age distribution, as of 2000, in Niederwil is; 21 children or 5.9% of the population are between 0 and 6 years old and 76 teenagers or 21.5% are between 7 and 19. Of the adult population, 9 people or 2.5% of the population are between 20 and 24 years old. 116 people or 32.8% are between 25 and 44, and 87 people or 24.6% are between 45 and 64. The senior population distribution is 36 people or 10.2% of the population are between 65 and 79 years old and there are 9 people or 2.5% who are over 80.

As of 2000, there were 140 people who were single and never married in the village. There were 183 married individuals, 17 widows or widowers and 14 individuals who are divorced.

As of 2000, there were private households in the village, and an average of . persons per household. There were 37 households that consist of only one person and 15 households with five or more people. Out of a total of 143 households that answered this question, 25.9% were households made up of just one person and there were 3 adults who lived with their parents. Of the rest of the households, there are 37 married couples without children, 52 married couples with children There were 8 single parents with a child or children. There were 5 households that were made up of unrelated people and 1 household that was made up of some sort of institution or another collective housing.

In 2000 there were 69 single family homes (or 62.7% of the total) out of a total of 110 inhabited buildings. There were 22 multi-family buildings (20.0%), along with 15 multi-purpose buildings that were mostly used for housing (13.6%) and 4 other use buildings (commercial or industrial) that also had some housing (3.6%). Of the single family homes 6 were built before 1919, while 10 were built between 1990 and 2000. The greatest number of single family homes (17) were built between 1971 and 1980.

In 2000 there were 149 apartments in the village. The most common apartment size was 4 rooms of which there were 38. There were 1 single room apartments and 66 apartments with five or more rooms. Of these apartments, a total of 134 apartments (89.9% of the total) were permanently occupied, while 10 apartments (6.7%) were seasonally occupied and 5 apartments (3.4%) were empty. As of 2009, the construction rate of new housing units was new units per 1000 residents. The vacancy rate for the village, in 2010, was %.

The historical population is given in the following chart:

== Politics ==
In the 2007 federal election the most popular party was the SP which received 27.55% of the vote. The next three most popular parties were the SVP (26.24%), the CVP (19.58%) and the Green Party (13.52%). In the federal election, a total of 142 votes were cast, and the voter turnout was 48.5%.

== Economy ==
As of 2010, Niederwil had an unemployment rate of 0%. As of 2008, there were people employed in the primary economic sector and about businesses involved in this sector. people were employed in the secondary sector and there were businesses in this sector. people were employed in the tertiary sector, with businesses in this sector. There were 192 residents of the village who were employed in some capacity, of which females made up 42.7% of the workforce.

In 2008 the total number of full-time equivalent jobs was 53. The number of jobs in the primary sector was 13, of which 9 were in agriculture and 4 were in forestry or lumber production. The number of jobs in the secondary sector was 15 of which 4 or (26.7%) were in manufacturing and 11 (73.3%) were in construction. The number of jobs in the tertiary sector was 25. In the tertiary sector; 14 or 56.0% were in the sale or repair of motor vehicles, 4 or 16.0% were in a hotel or restaurant, 2 or 8.0% were in the information industry, 2 or 8.0% were technical professionals or scientists, 3 or 12.0% were in education.

In 2000, there were 22 workers who commuted into the village and 149 workers who commuted away. The village is a net exporter of workers, with about 6.8 workers leaving the village for every one entering. Of the working population, % used public transportation to get to work, and % used a private car.

== Religion ==
From the 2000 census, 153 or 43.2% were Roman Catholic, while 130 or 36.7% belonged to the Swiss Reformed Church. Of the rest of the population, there was 1 member of an Orthodox church who belonged. There were 10 (or about 2.82% of the population) who were Islamic. There was 1 person who was Buddhist and 1 individual who belonged to another church. 54 (or about 15.25% of the population) belonged to no church, are agnostic or atheist, and 4 individuals (or about 1.13% of the population) did not answer the question.

== Education ==
In Niederwil about 142 or (40.1%) of the population have completed non-mandatory upper secondary education, and 41 or (11.6%) have completed additional higher education (either University or a Fachhochschule). Of the 41 who completed tertiary schooling, 73.2% were Swiss men, 26.8% were Swiss women.

As of 2000, there were 3 students in Niederwil who came from another village, while 45 residents attended schools outside the village.
