= Welschenrohr-Gänsbrunnen =

- Municipality
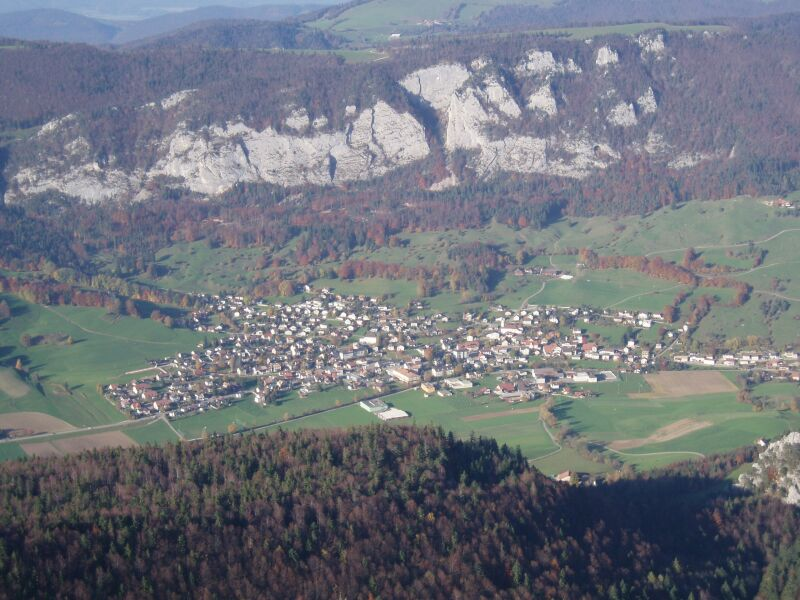
- Welschenrohr village

- Coat of arms
- Location of Welschenrohr-Gänsbrunnen
- Location within Switzerland Location within Canton of Solothurn
- Coordinates: 47°16′N 7°28′E
- Country: Switzerland
- Canton: Solothurn
- District: Thal

Area
  - Total: 11.44 km^{2} (4.42 sq mi)
- Elevation: 732 m (2,402 ft)

Population (December 2020)
  - Total: 83
  - Density: 7.3/km^{2} (19/sq mi)
- Time zone: UTC+01:00 (CET)
  - Summer (DST): UTC+02:00 (CEST)
- Postal code: 4716
- SFOS number: 2430
- ISO 3166 code: CH-SO
- Surrounded by: Corcelles (BE), Court (BE), Crémines (BE), Eschert (BE), Grandval (BE), Herbetswil, Oberdorf, Seehof (BE), Selzach
- Website: https://welschenrohr.ch/ SFSO statistics

Welschenrohr-Gänsbrunnen is a municipality in the district of Thal in the canton of Solothurn in Switzerland. On 1 January 2021 the former municipalities of Gänsbrunnen and Welschenrohr merged to form the new municipality of Welschenrohr-Gänsbrunnen.

== History ==
=== Gänsbrunnen ===
Gänsbrunnen is first mentioned in 1428.

=== Welschenrohr ===
Welschenrohr is first mentioned in 1179 as Rore. An important watch manufacturing place up to the 1960s, its economy was heavily affected by the late 1960s watch crisis. Now, its economy specializes in fine mechanics.

=== Wisent rewilding ===
From September 2022, at least five European bisons will live in semi-freedom, within a large enclosure that is accessible by existing hiking paths. The long-term project near the Sollmatt farm will monitor how the bison cope with the local landscape and climate, and decide whether releasing the large animals into the Swiss Jura Mountains is feasible.

== Geography ==
One of the largest continuous forested areas of Switzerland is located on the north slope of the Weissenstein mountain, and is partly located on the area of Welschenrohr-Gänsbrunnen.

== Demographics ==
The new municipality has a population (as of December 2020) of 1,158.

== Historic Population ==
The historical population is given in the following chart:
