= Gänsbrunnen railway station =

Railway station in Gänsbrunnen, Switzerland

Gänsbrunnen
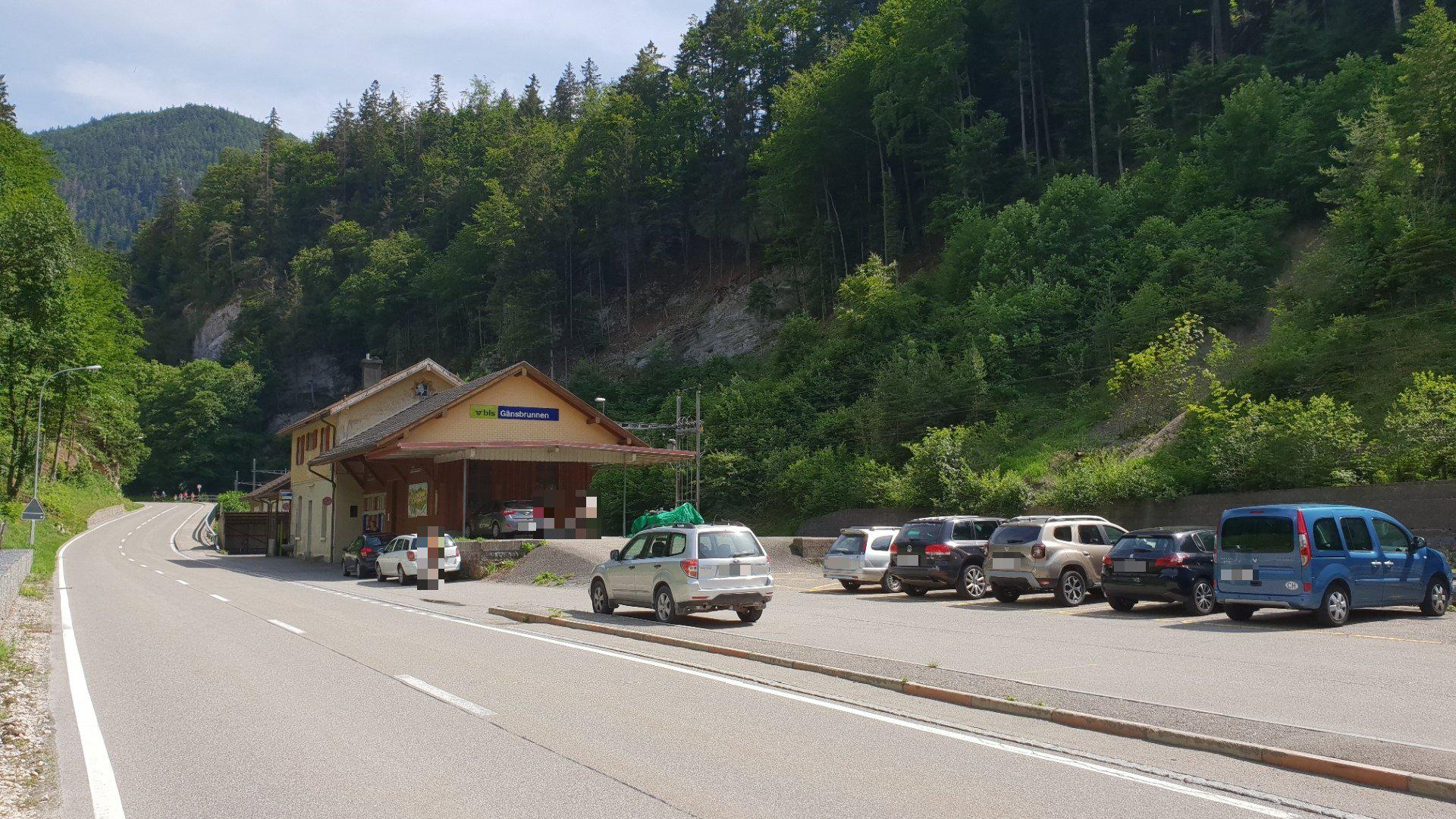
- The station building in 2018

General information
- Location: Gänsbrunnen; Switzerland
- Coordinates: 47°15′54″N 7°27′54″E
- Elevation: 719 m (2,359 ft)
- Owner: BLS AG
- Line: Solothurn–Moutier line
- Distance: 13.6 km (8.5 mi) from Solothurn West
- Platforms: 1
- Tracks: 3
- Train operators: Swiss Federal Railways
- Connections: PostAuto AG bus line

Construction
- Parking: Yes (10 spaces)
- Accessible: No

Other information
- Station code: 8500265 (GAE)
- Fare zone: 215 and 345 (Libero)

Passengers
- 2023: 200 per weekday (SBB)
Location

Gänsbrunnen railway station (German: Bahnhof Gänsbrunnen) is a railway station in the municipality of Gänsbrunnen, in the Swiss canton of Bern. It is an intermediate stop on the standard gauge Solothurn–Moutier line of BLS AG and is served by local trains only.

== History ==
Between Spring 2024 and March 2026, the Weissenstein Tunnel is getting a renovation and remains closed. The BLS is using the tunnel closure to renovate the whole of the line. This station will be modernized to permit barrier-free boarding and will be protected against natural hazards. Replacement buses are running between Gänsbrunnen and Moutier during the construction work.
