= Balm ruins =

Balm Castle ruins
- Balm bei Günsberg
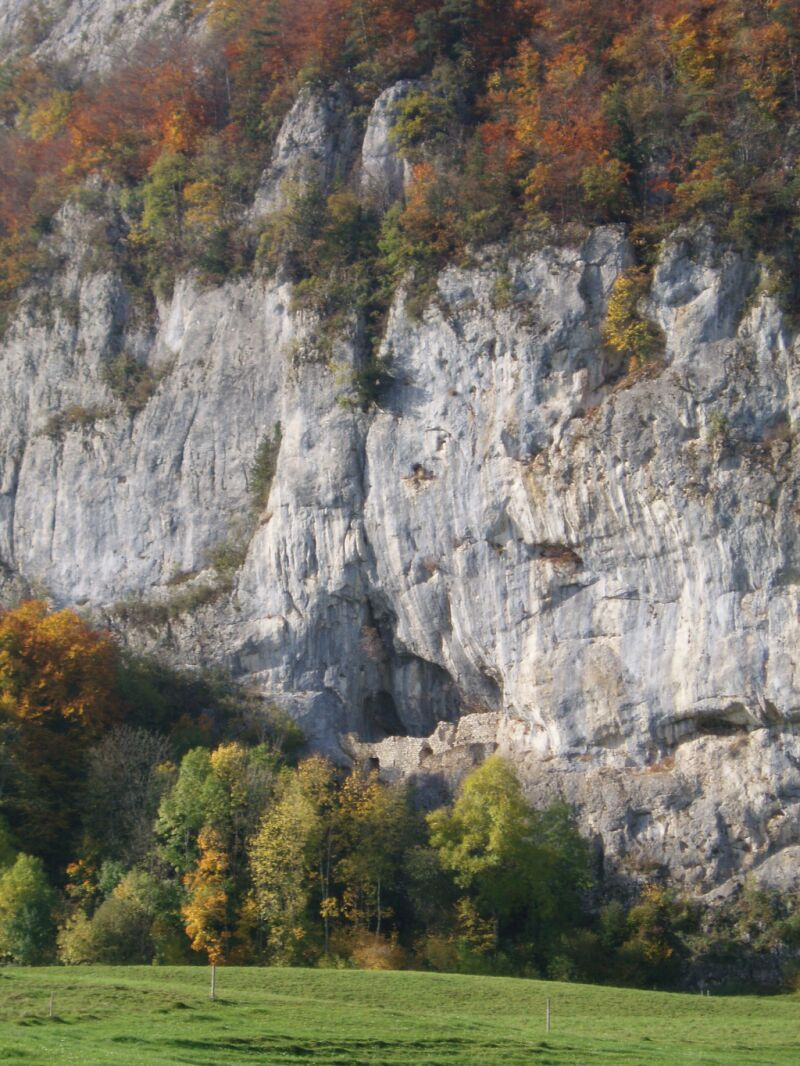
- Ruins of the Balm Cave Castle

Site information
- Type: Cave castle
- Code: CH-SO
- Condition: ruin

Location
- Coordinates: 47°15′20″N 7°33′18″E

Site history
- Built: mid 11th century

The Balm ruins (German: Ruine Balm or Ruine Balmfluh) are the remains of a fortified cave dwelling at the foot of Balmfluh (alternative spelling: Balmflue) in the Jura Mountains, in the municipality of Balm bei Günsberg in the Canton of Solothurn. It is that canton's only cave stronghold and one of the few in Switzerland. It is a Swiss heritage site of national significance.

== Layout ==
The stronghold was built 20 metres (66 ft) high in a natural cave of about 20 metres (66 ft) wide and 6 metres (20 ft) deep.

The 2.4-metre (8 ft) thick outer wall was provided with two doorways and some narrow windows. The wet rock face was covered with a lining wall; and the rest was a simple two-story timber construction, which is shown evident by the presence of holes into which beams were inserted. While being restored, the presently visible wall openings were distorted from their original form. At a later stage in the building of the stronghold, a fortified, inhabited house with an inside width of 3.5 metres (11 ft) and a length of 29 metres (95 ft) was erected in the forecourt. Presumably this was a defensive fortification of some farming complex.

The entrance to the stone fortress stretched over a long, partly walled rise which is partly hewn from the rock. The connection between the forecourt and the fortress itself is still only incompletely reconstructed. The present-day rise is of modern source, and only partly represents its original state.

Excavations from the years 1939 and 1941 indicate that the place had been used as a habitation since early times.

== Gallery ==
Narrow staircase leading up to the castle

Exterior view with bailey area

Interior View

Interior View with entrance (right) and timber holes for floor, located above window

Interior view, showing the narrow cave (grotto) used for housing and living

Exterior view, showing bailey area

== Bibliography ==
- Fritz Hauswirth: Die schönsten Burgen und Schlösser der Schweiz. Neptun, Kreuzlingen 1977, ISBN 3-85820-024-7, S. 240–242
- Bruno Amiet: Die Burgen und Schlösser des Kantons Solothurn [Die Burgen und Schlösser der Schweiz, volume III]. Basel 1930.
- Emil Erdin: Burgen der Schweiz, Band 7, Silva-Verlag, Zürich 1981
