= Balm bei Günsberg =

- Municipality
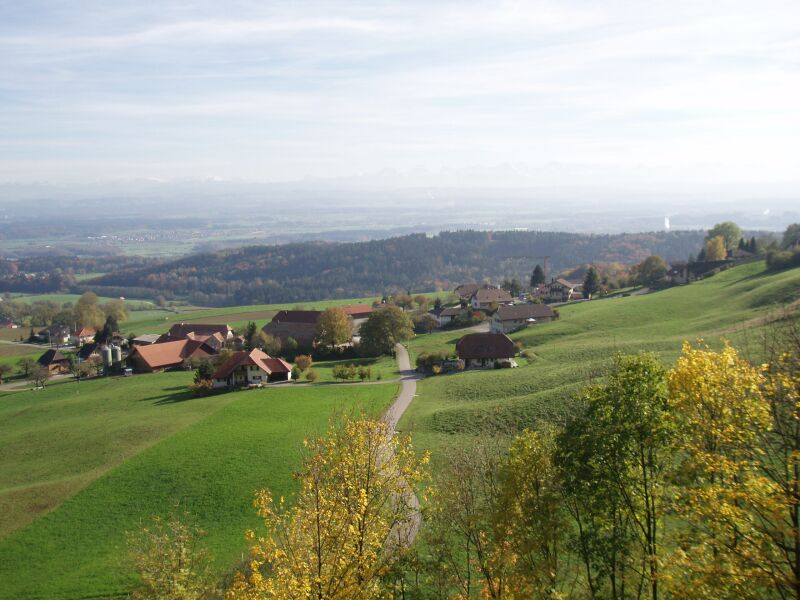
- Balm bei Günsberg village

- Coat of arms
- Location of Balm bei Günsberg
- Location within Switzerland Location within Canton of Solothurn
- Coordinates: 47°15′N 7°33′E
- Country: Switzerland
- Canton: Solothurn
- District: Lebern

Area
  - Total: 5.48 km^{2} (2.12 sq mi)
- Elevation: 655 m (2,149 ft)

Population (December 2020)
  - Total: 221
  - Density: 40.3/km^{2} (104/sq mi)
- Time zone: UTC+01:00 (CET)
  - Summer (DST): UTC+02:00 (CEST)
- Postal code: 4525
- SFOS number: 2541
- ISO 3166 code: CH-SO
- Surrounded by: Günsberg, Herbetswil, Niederwil, Rüttenen, Welschenrohr
- Website: www.balm-balmberg.ch

Balm bei Günsberg is a municipality in the district of Lebern in the canton of Solothurn in Switzerland.

== Geography ==
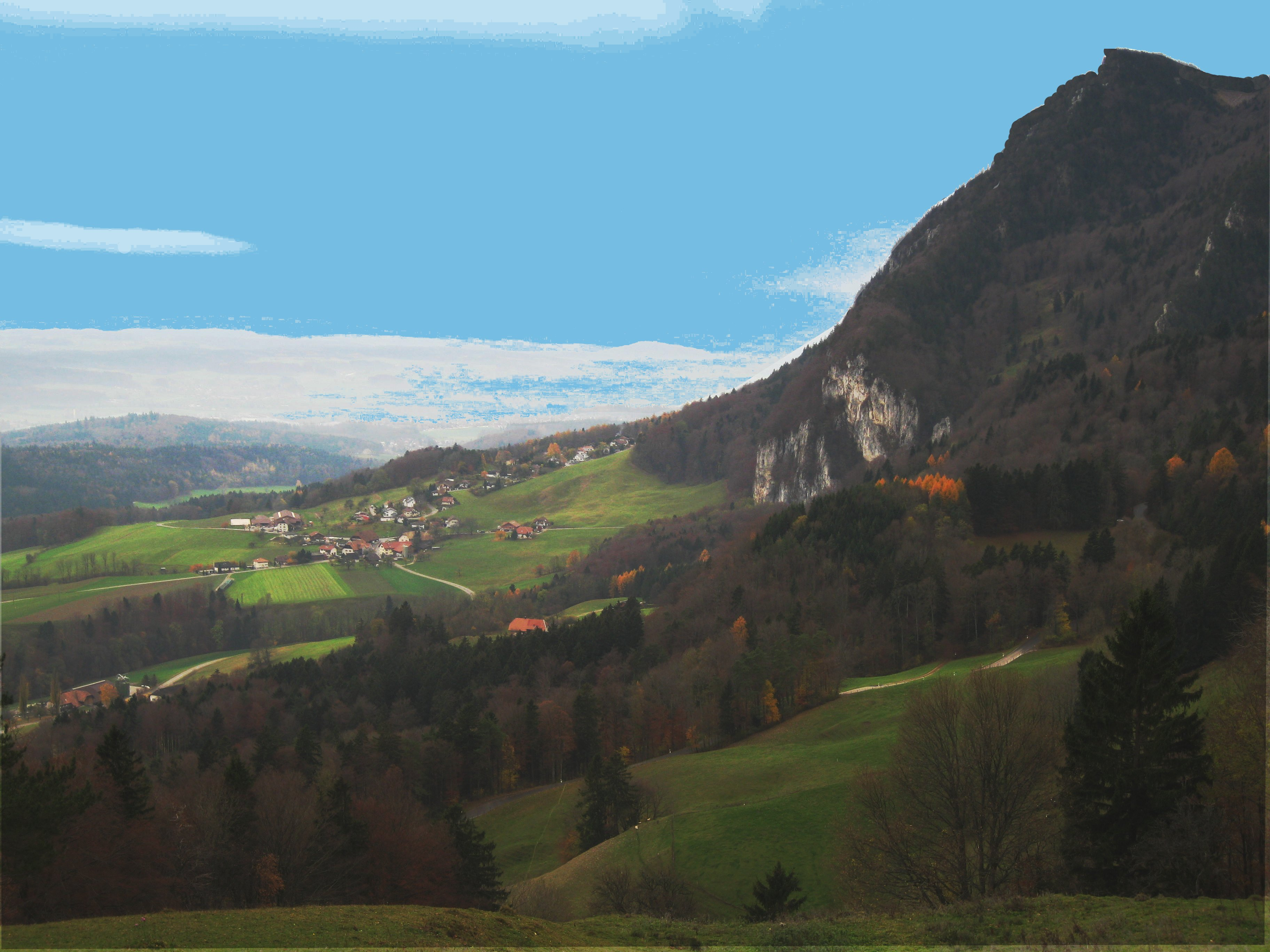
Balm bei Günsberg

Aerial view (1953)

Balm bei Günsberg has an area, as of 2009, of 5.48 square kilometers (2.12 sq mi). Of this area, 1.77 km^{2} (0.68 sq mi) or 32.3% is used for agricultural purposes, while 3.4 km^{2} (1.3 sq mi) or 62.0% is forested. Of the rest of the land, 0.17 km^{2} (0.066 sq mi) or 3.1% is settled (buildings or roads) and 0.12 km^{2} (30 acres) or 2.2% is unproductive land.

Of the built up area, housing and buildings made up 1.5% and transportation infrastructure made up 1.6%. Out of the forested land, 58.9% of the total land area is heavily forested and 3.1% is covered with orchards or small clusters of trees. Of the agricultural land, 3.6% is used for growing crops and 10.2% is pastures and 18.4% is used for alpine pastures.

The municipality is located in the Lebern district. It consists of several scattered groups of houses at the base of the Balmberg in the Jura Mountains.

== Coat of arms ==
The blazon of the municipal coat of arms is Per pale Gules and Argent.

== Demographics ==
Balm bei Günsberg has a population (as of December 2020) of 221. As of 2008, 6.8% of the population are resident foreign nationals. Over the last 10 years (1999–2009 ) the population has changed at a rate of -11.2%.

Most of the population (as of 2000) speaks German (188 or 95.9%), with English being second most common (6 or 3.1%) and French being third (1 or 0.5%).

As of 2008, the gender distribution of the population was 56.5% male and 43.5% female. The population was made up of 95 Swiss men (49.7% of the population) and 13 (6.8%) non-Swiss men. There were 78 Swiss women (40.8%) and 5 (2.6%) non-Swiss women. Of the population in the municipality 58 or about 29.6% were born in Balm bei Günsberg and lived there in 2000. There were 66 or 33.7% who were born in the same canton, while 50 or 25.5% were born somewhere else in Switzerland, and 18 or 9.2% were born outside of Switzerland.

In 2008 there was 1 death of a Swiss citizen. Ignoring immigration and emigration, the population of Swiss citizens decreased by 1 while the foreign population remained the same. There was 1 Swiss man who immigrated back to Switzerland and 1 Swiss woman who emigrated from Switzerland. At the same time, there were 2 non-Swiss men who immigrated from another country to Switzerland and 1 non-Swiss woman who emigrated from Switzerland to another country. The total Swiss population change in 2008 (from all sources, including moves across municipal borders) was a decrease of 11 and the non-Swiss population increased by 3 people. This represents a population growth rate of -4.0%.

The age distribution, as of 2000, in Balm bei Günsberg is; 18 children or 9.2% of the population are between 0 and 6 years old and 31 teenagers or 15.8% are between 7 and 19. Of the adult population, 8 people or 4.1% of the population are between 20 and 24 years old. 65 people or 33.2% are between 25 and 44, and 57 people or 29.1% are between 45 and 64. The senior population distribution is 11 people or 5.6% of the population are between 65 and 79 years old and there are 6 people or 3.1% who are over 80.

As of 2000, there were 79 people who were single and never married in the municipality. There were 102 married individuals, 6 widows or widowers and 9 individuals who are divorced.

As of 2000, there were 75 private households in the municipality, and an average of 2.6 persons per household. There were 12 households that consist of only one person and 3 households with five or more people. Out of a total of 75 households that answered this question, 16.0% were households made up of just one person. Of the rest of the households, there are 29 married couples without children, 28 married couples with children There were 4 single parents with a child or children. There were 2 households that were made up of unrelated people.

In 2000 there were 55 single family homes (or 74.3% of the total) out of a total of 74 inhabited buildings. There were 2 multi-family buildings (2.7%), along with 12 multi-purpose buildings that were mostly used for housing (16.2%) and 5 other use buildings (commercial or industrial) that also had some housing (6.8%). Of the single family homes 1 were built before 1919, while 10 were built between 1990 and 2000. The greatest number of single family homes (28) were built between 1981 and 1990.

In 2000 there were 77 apartments in the municipality. The most common apartment size was 5 rooms of which there were 23. There were 2 single room apartments and 45 apartments with five or more rooms. Of these apartments, a total of 73 apartments (94.8% of the total) were permanently occupied, while 2 apartments (2.6%) were seasonally occupied and 2 apartments (2.6%) were empty. As of 2009, the construction rate of new housing units was 5.5 new units per 1000 residents. The vacancy rate for the municipality, in 2010, was 1.22%.

The historical population is given in the following chart:

== Heritage sites of national significance ==
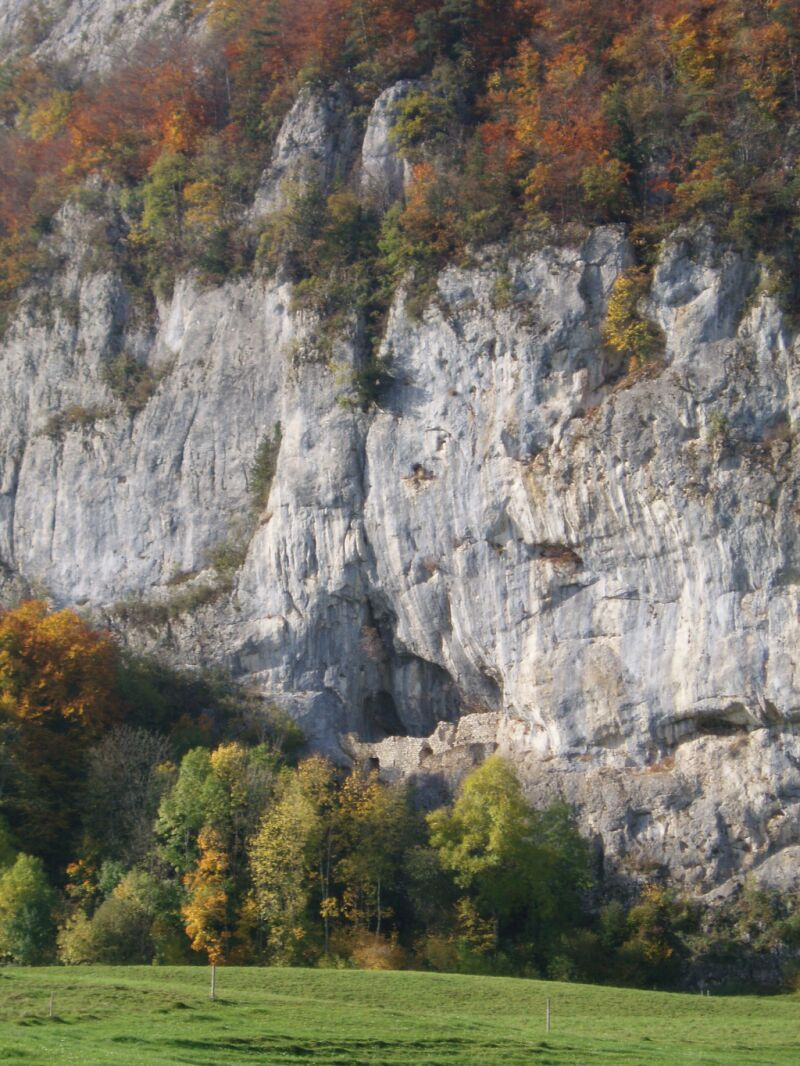
Balmfluh Castle

The ruins of Balmfluh Castle are listed as a Swiss heritage site of national significance.

== Politics ==
In the 2007 federal election the most popular party was the CVP which received 25.82% of the vote. The next three most popular parties were the SVP (21.98%), the SP (20.33%) and the FDP (19.23%). In the federal election, a total of 78 votes were cast, and the voter turnout was 51.3%.

== Economy ==
As of 2010, Balm bei Günsberg had an unemployment rate of 0.4%. As of 2008, there were 16 people employed in the primary economic sector and about 9 businesses involved in this sector. 2 people were employed in the secondary sector and there were 2 businesses in this sector. 59 people were employed in the tertiary sector, with 11 businesses in this sector. There were 120 residents of the municipality who were employed in some capacity, of which females made up 42.5% of the workforce.

In 2008 the total number of full-time equivalent jobs was 53. The number of jobs in the primary sector was 11, all of which were in agriculture. The number of jobs in the secondary sector was 2, all of which were in manufacturing. The number of jobs in the tertiary sector was 40. In the tertiary sector; 2 or 5.0% were in wholesale or retail sales or the repair of motor vehicles, 5 or 12.5% were in the movement and storage of goods, 11 or 27.5% were in a hotel or restaurant, 1 was in education.

In 2000, there were 10 workers who commuted into the municipality and 92 workers who commuted away. The municipality is a net exporter of workers, with about 9.2 workers leaving the municipality for every one entering. Of the working population, 5.8% used public transportation to get to work, and 65.8% used a private car.

== Religion ==
From the 2000 census, 78 or 39.8% were Roman Catholic, while 74 or 37.8% belonged to the Swiss Reformed Church. Of the rest of the population, there were 2 members of an Orthodox church (or about 1.02% of the population), and there were 7 individuals (or about 3.57% of the population) who belonged to another Christian church. There were 4 (or about 2.04% of the population) who were Islamic. 29 (or about 14.80% of the population) belonged to no church, are agnostic or atheist, and 2 individuals (or about 1.02% of the population) did not answer the question.

== Education ==
In Balm bei Günsberg about 81 or (41.3%) of the population have completed non-mandatory upper secondary education, and 40 or (20.4%) have completed additional higher education (either university or a Fachhochschule). Of the 40 who completed tertiary schooling, 75.0% were Swiss men, 17.5% were Swiss women.

As of 2000, there were 26 students from Balm bei Günsberg who attended schools outside the municipality.
