= Seehof, Switzerland =

Seehof
- Municipality
- Flag Coat of arms
- Location of Seehof
- Location within Switzerland Location within Canton of Bern
- Coordinates: 47°18′N 7°31′E
- Country: Switzerland
- Canton: Bern
- District: Jura bernois

Government
  - Executive: Gemeinderat
  - Mayor: Gemeindepräsident

Area
  - Total: 8.42 km^{2} (3.25 sq mi)
- Elevation: 752 m (2,467 ft)

Population (Dec 2011)
  - Total: 70
  - Density: 8.3/km^{2} (22/sq mi)
- Time zone: UTC+01:00 (CET)
  - Summer (DST): UTC+02:00 (CEST)
- Postal code: 2747
- SFOS number: 709
- ISO 3166 code: CH-BE
- Surrounded by: Corcelles, Vermes (JU), Aedermannsdorf (SO), Herbetswil (SO), Welschenrohr (SO), Gänsbrunnen(SO)
- Website: www.schule-seehof.ch

Seehof (Elay in French) is a municipality in the Jura bernois administrative district in the canton of Bern in Switzerland. It is one of two municipalities with German as its official language in the otherwise French-speaking Bernese Jura (Jura Bernois). The other is Schelten.

== History ==
Seehof is first mentioned in 1540 as Seehoft. In 1673 it was mentioned as Eslay. Until 1914 the official name was the French name Elay. By 1880 almost the entire population (97%) of the village was German speaking.

For most of its history, the village was part of the lands of the provost of Moutier-Grandval under the Prince-Bishop of Basel. During the Protestant Reformation in 1528, Seehof/Elay was part of the Sous-les-Roches region that remained by the old faith. After the 1797 French victory and the Treaty of Campo Formio, Seehof became part of the French Département of Mont-Terrible. Three years later, in 1800 it became part of the Département of Haut-Rhin. After Napoleon's defeat and the Congress of Vienna, Seehof was assigned to the Canton of Bern in 1815.

Today it is part of the Catholic parish of Vermes. The Swiss Reformed residents are part of the German speaking parish of Moutier or the parish of Grandval.

A village school is first mentioned in 1784. In 1969, the current school building was built.

== Geography ==
Seehof has an area of 8.42 km^{2} (3.25 sq mi). As of 2012, a total of 2.8 km^{2} (1.1 mi^{2}) or 33.3% is used for agricultural purposes, while 5.36 km^{2} (2.07 mi^{2}) or 63.7% is forested. Of the rest of the land, 0.19 km^{2} (0.073 mi^{2}) or 2.3% is settled (buildings or roads), 0.05 km^{2} (12 acres) or 0.6% is either rivers or lakes.

During the same year, housing and buildings made up 1.2% and transportation infrastructure made up 0.8%. Out of the forested land, 59.7% of the total land area is heavily forested and 4.0% is covered with orchards or small clusters of trees. Of the agricultural land, 1.2% is used for growing crops and 18.7% is pastures and 13.2% is used for alpine pastures. All the water in the municipality is flowing water.

The municipality is located in the Seehof valley. It consists of the village of Seehof and the hamlets of Bächlen, Karlisberg and Stägen.

On 31 December 2009 District de Moutier, the municipality's former district, was dissolved. On the following day, 1 January 2010, it joined the newly created Arrondissement administratif Jura bernois.

== Coat of arms ==
The blazon of the municipal coat of arms is Argent a Cow Gules statant on a Mount of 3 Coupeaux Vert.

== Demographics ==
Seehof has a population (as of December 2020) of 56. As of 2010, 2.9% of the population are resident foreign nationals. Over the last 10 years (2001-2011) the population has changed at a rate of 1.4%. Migration accounted for 0%, while births and deaths accounted for 1.4%.

Most of the population (as of 2000) speaks German (72 or 91.1%) as their first language with the rest speaking French.

As of 2008, the population was 56.5% male and 43.5% female. The population was made up of 39 Swiss men (56.5% of the population) and (0.0%) non-Swiss men. There were 28 Swiss women (40.6%) and 2 (2.9%) non-Swiss women. Of the population in the municipality, 35 or about 44.3% were born in Seehof and lived there in 2000. There were 11 or 13.9% who were born in the same canton, while 23 or 29.1% were born somewhere else in Switzerland, and 6 or 7.6% were born outside of Switzerland.

As of 2011, children and teenagers (0–19 years old) make up 27.1% of the population, while adults (20–64 years old) make up 54.3% and seniors (over 64 years old) make up 18.6%.

As of 2000, there were 42 people who were single and never married in the municipality. There were 32 married individuals, 4 widows or widowers and 1 individual who was divorced.

As of 2010, there were 3 households that consist of only one person and 7 households with five or more people. In 2000, a total of 21 apartments (87.5% of the total) were permanently occupied, while 3 apartments (12.5%) were seasonally occupied. The vacancy rate for the municipality, in 2012, was 3.7%. In 2011, single family homes made up 29.2% of the total housing in the municipality.

The historical population is given in the following chart:

== Politics ==
In the 2011 federal election the most popular party was the Swiss People's Party (SVP) which received 50% of the vote. The next three most popular parties were the Federal Democratic Union of Switzerland (EDU) (20.6%), the Green Party (15.2%) and the Conservative Democratic Party (BDP) (11.4%). In the federal election, a total of 25 votes were cast, and the voter turnout was 41.0%.

== Economy ==
As of 2011, Seehof had an unemployment rate of 0%. As of 2008, there were a total of 33 people employed in the municipality. Of these, there were 33 people employed in the primary economic sector and about 14 businesses involved in this sector. No one was employed in the secondary sector or the tertiary sector. There were 34 residents of the municipality who were employed in some capacity, of which females made up 29.4% of the workforce.

In 2008 there were a total of 25 full-time equivalent jobs, of which 23 were in agriculture and 2 were in forestry or lumber production.

In 2000, there were 5 workers who commuted into the municipality and 10 workers who commuted away. The municipality is a net exporter of workers, with about 2.0 workers leaving the municipality for every one entering. A total of 24 workers (82.8% of the 29 total workers in the municipality) both lived and worked in Seehof.

Of the working population, 14.7% used public transportation to get to work, and 17.6% used a private car.

In 2011 the average local and cantonal tax rate on a married resident, with two children, of Seehof making 150,000 CHF was 12.7%, while an unmarried resident's rate was 18.7%. For comparison, the rate for the entire canton in the same year, was 14.2% and 22.0%, while the nationwide rate was 12.3% and 21.1% respectively. In 2009 there were a total of 25 tax payers in the municipality. Of that total, 2 made over 75,000 CHF per year. The greatest number of workers, 6, made between 20,000 and 30,000 CHF per year. The average income of the over 75,000 CHF group in Seehof was 89,400 CHF, while the average across all of Switzerland was 130,478 CHF. In 2011 a total of 2.9% of the population received direct financial assistance from the government.

== Religion ==
From the 2000 census, 48 or 60.8% belonged to the Swiss Reformed Church, while 5 or 6.3% were Roman Catholic. Of the rest of the population, there were 12 individuals (or about 15.19% of the population) who belonged to another Christian church. 11 (or about 13.92% of the population) belonged to no church, are agnostic or atheist, and 3 individuals (or about 3.80% of the population) did not answer the question.

== Education ==
In Seehof about 55.6% of the population have completed non-mandatory upper secondary education, and 2.8% have completed additional higher education (either university or a Fachhochschule). Of the 2 who had completed some form of tertiary schooling listed in the census, 50.0% were Swiss men, 50.0% were Swiss women.

The Canton of Bern school system provides one year of non-obligatory Kindergarten, followed by six years of Primary school. This is followed by three years of obligatory lower Secondary school where the students are separated according to ability and aptitude. Following the lower Secondary students may attend additional schooling or they may enter an apprenticeship.

During the 2011-12 school year, there were a total of 7 students attending classes in Seehof. Of these, 4 attended a primary school that was shared with a neighboring municipality while 3 attended a lower secondary class in the municipality.

As of 2000, there were a total of 13 students attending any school in the municipality. Of those, 13 both lived and attended school in the municipality, while 2 students from Seehof attended schools outside the municipality.
