= High mountain tour =

Multi-day hiking at high altitudes

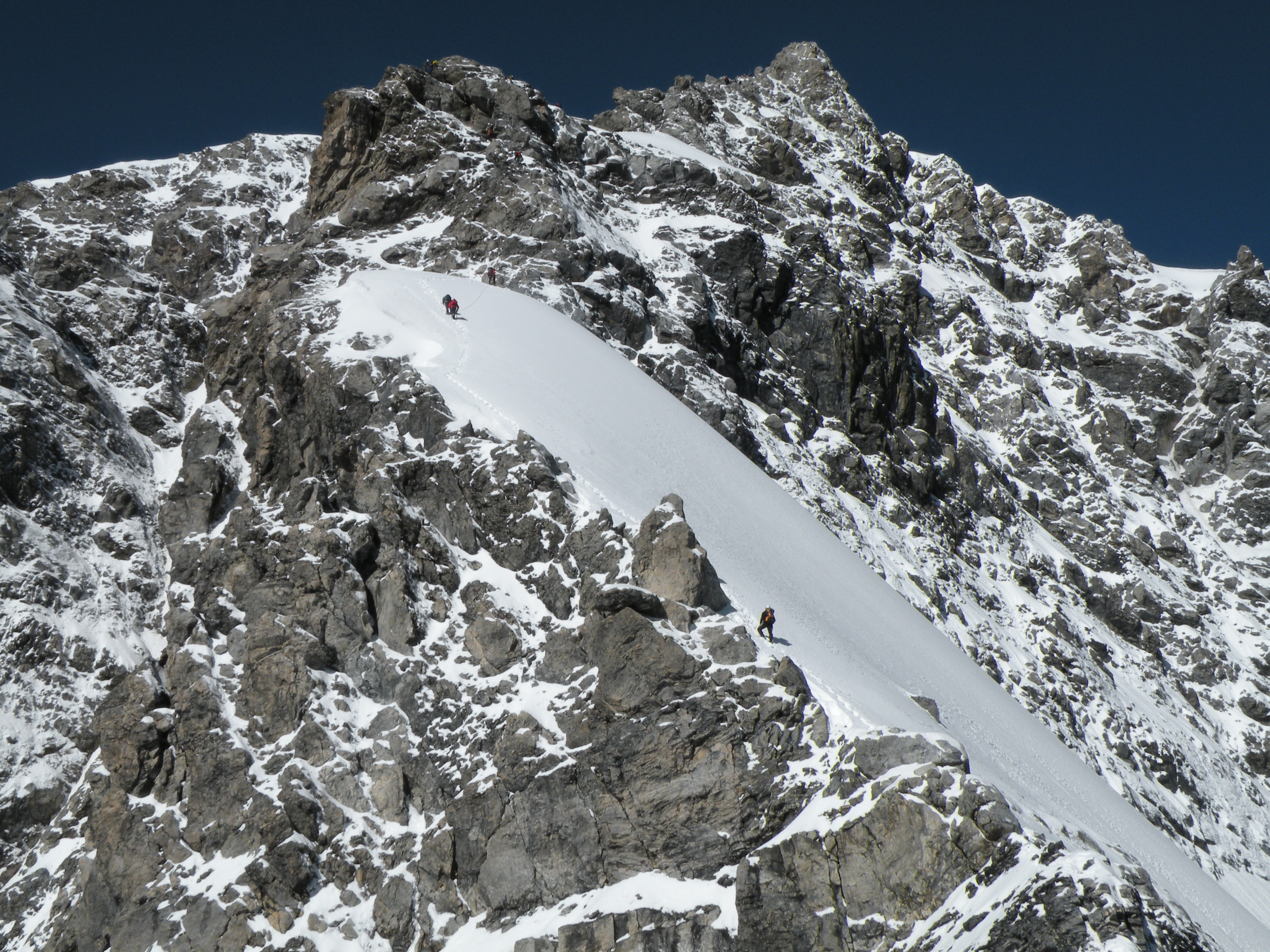
Mixed terrain on the Ortler's Hinter Arête, a classic high mountain tour

A high mountain tour (German: Hochtour) is usually multi-day hiking and scrambling that takes place in the higher-altitude zone that is covered by ice all year round, the nival zone. High mountain tours require special additional preparation and equipment to the standard hiking and scrambling requirements.

== Alpine Hochtour ==
In the Alps, a high mountain tour is known in the German-speaking areas as a Hochtour where, above a height of about 3,000 metres (High Alps), many mountains are at least partly glaciated. Important historic milestones in the development of high mountain touring in the Alps were the first ascents of the Ankogel (3,262 m) in 1762, Mont Blanc (4,810 m) in 1786, the Großglockner (3,798 m) in 1800 and the Ortler (3,905 m) in 1804 as well as the conquest of many high western Alpine summits during the golden age of Alpinism around the middle of the 19th century. In other parts of the world the term may be misleading. For example, in many non-Alpine areas, such as the polar regions, much lower mountains are glaciated. On the other hand, the summits of much higher peaks in the tropics are not always in the nival zone. As a result, their ascent cannot automatically be described as a high mountain tour using the Alpine definition, even if they share some of the features of Alpinism, such as requiring a certain acclimatization. Mountaineering expeditions in which elevation plays a particularly important role, especially those from about 7,000 m are no longer referred to as high mountain tours, but tend to be described by the term high altitude mountaineering.

== Special requirements ==
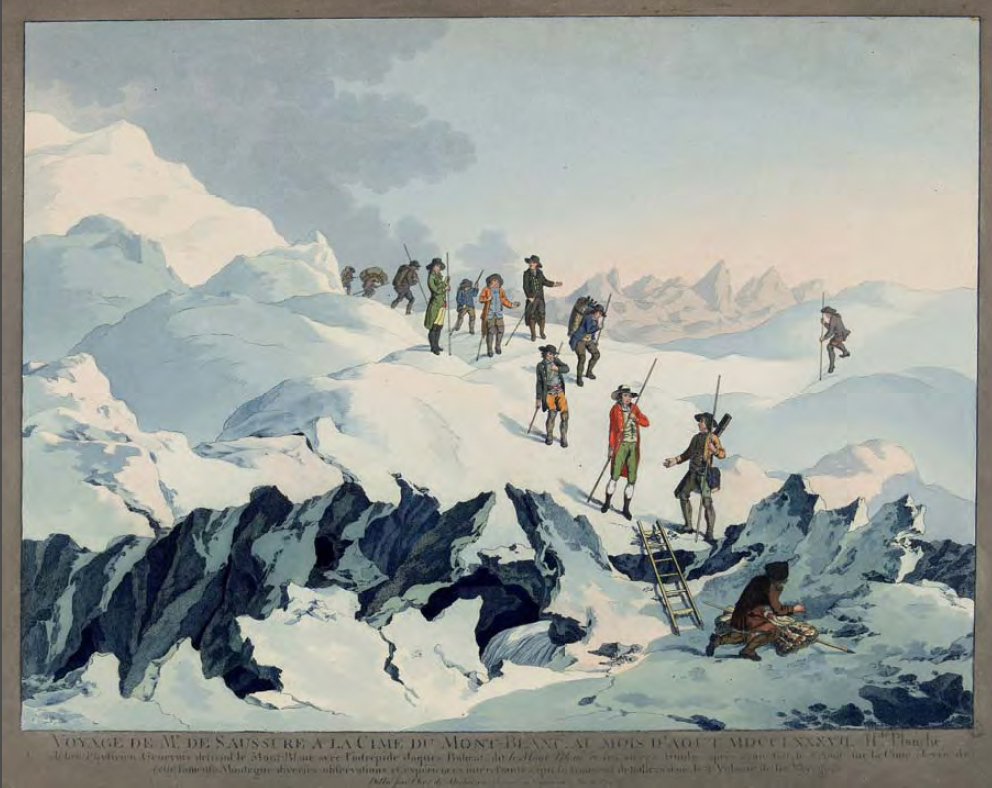
The start of the high mountain tour at the end of the 18th century: contemporary portrait by Marquard Wocher of Horace-Bénédict de Saussure on Mont Blanc in 1787

In glaciated terrain the risk of crevasses means that even technically easy walks require the use of rope, crampons, and ice axes as well as knowledge of safety and rescue techniques. Techniques and equipment include crevasse rescue gear, the T-anchor, the ice screw, and snow protection. Walking with a rope requires a roped team to be formed and makes trekking alone dangerous. A greater level of fitness and height acclimatization is needed, especially for mountain tours in very high altitudes such as the Himalayas, the Karakoram or the Andes, which reach elevations of over 6,000 metres above sea level (and temperatures can be very low).

The more difficult 'classic high mountain tours' require the ability to handle basic rock and ice climbing and/or mixed climbing techniques.

The dangers and problems presented by high mountain touring, are caused less by the actual technical difficulty of climbing than by the (often rapidly changing) external conditions. The description of the requirements of a tour with the aid of climbing grade scales is therefore problematic. As a result, such scales attempt to take into account to a greater extent the severity of a route or its fitness requirements. An example of an established rating system for Alpinism is the SAC Mountain and High Mountain Tour Scale.

Map reading and the ability to read the weather may also be important in high mountain touring. When snow falls a knowledge of avalanche behavior is necessary, even in the summer months. High Alpine terrain is currently subject to a particularly high degree of change in terms of glacier retreat and climate change, which can both increase or decrease the difficulty and dangers of high mountain touring.

== See also ==
- Golden age of alpinism, early era of the high-mountain tour
- Haute Route, a high-mountain ski tour

== Literature ==
- Stefan Winter (2003), Richtig Hochtouren (in German), Munich: BLV, ISBN 3-405-16444-3
