= Gänsbrunnen =

- Former municipality
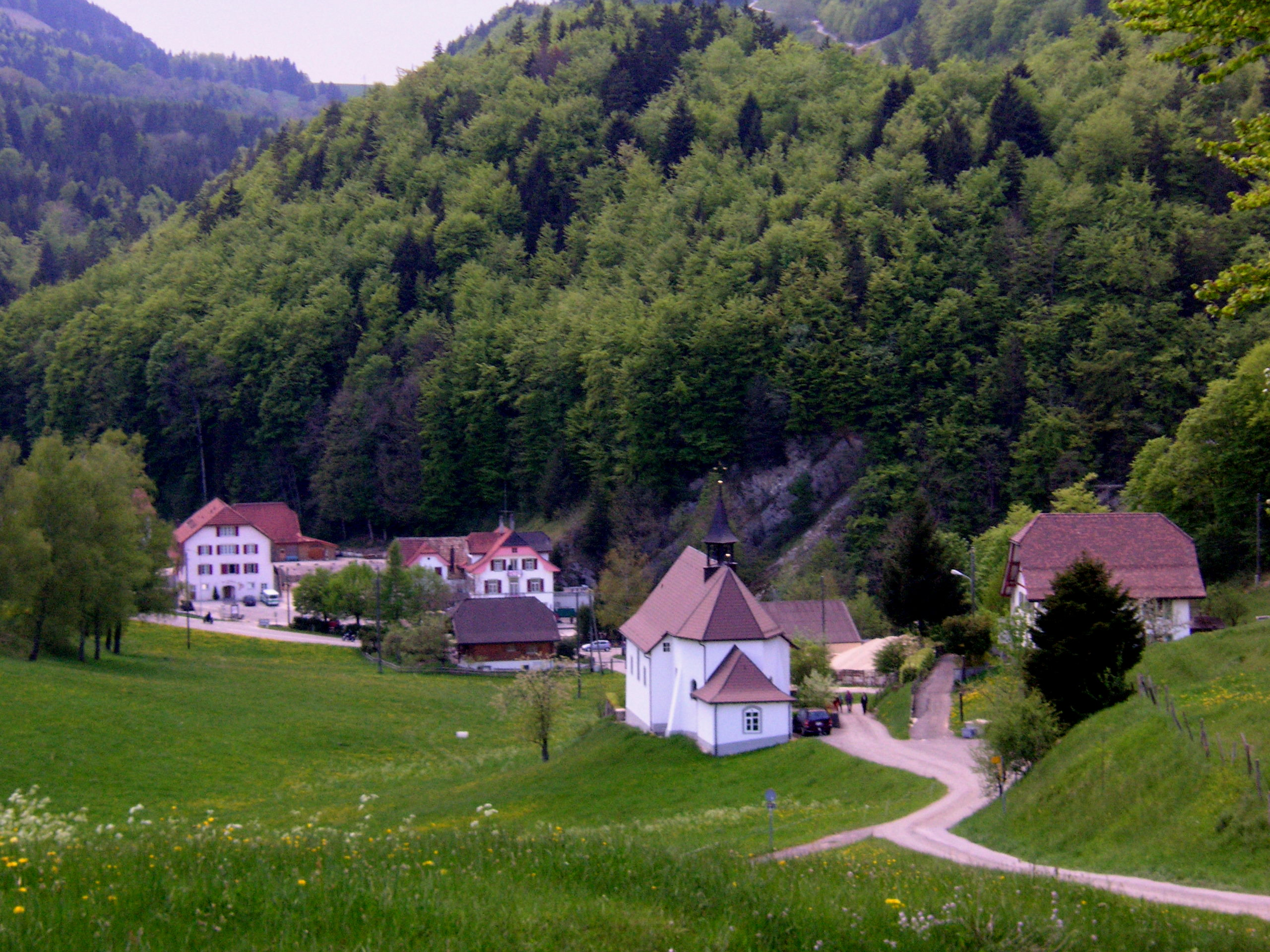
- Gänsbrunnen village

- Coat of arms
- Location of Gänsbrunnen
- Location within Switzerland Location within Canton of Solothurn
- Coordinates: 47°16′N 7°28′E
- Country: Switzerland
- Canton: Solothurn
- District: Thal

Area
  - Total: 11.44 km^{2} (4.42 sq mi)
- Elevation: 732 m (2,402 ft)

Population (December 2019)
  - Total: 82
  - Density: 7.2/km^{2} (19/sq mi)
- Time zone: UTC+01:00 (CET)
  - Summer (DST): UTC+02:00 (CEST)
- Postal code: 4716
- SFOS number: 2423
- ISO 3166 code: CH-SO
- Surrounded by: Corcelles (BE), Court (BE), Crémines (BE), Eschert (BE), Grandval (BE), Herbetswil, Oberdorf, Seehof (BE), Selzach, Welschenrohr
- Website: gaensbrunnen.ch

Gänsbrunnen is a former municipality in the district of Thal in the canton of Solothurn in Switzerland. The French name for Gänsbrunnen is Saint-Joseph. On 1 January 2021 the former municipalities of Gänsbrunnen and Welschenrohr merged to form the new municipality of Welschenrohr-Gänsbrunnen.

Gänsbrunnen was one of the smallest municipalities in Solothurn.

== History ==
Gänsbrunnen is first mentioned in 1428.

== Geography ==
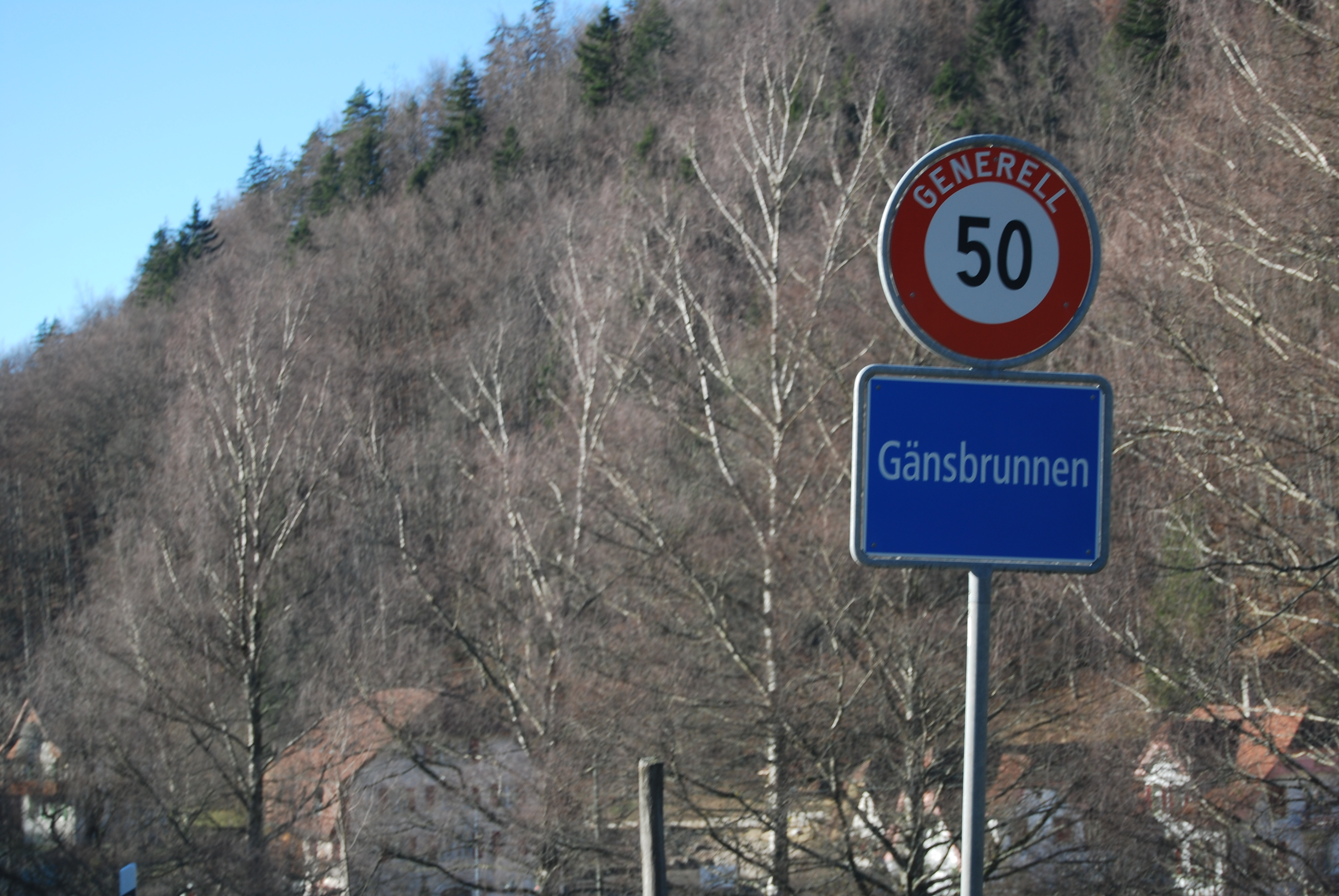
Border of the municipality

Gänsbrunnen had an area, as of 2009, of 11.44 square kilometers (4.42 sq mi). Of this area, 3.37 km^{2} (1.30 sq mi) or 29.5% is used for agricultural purposes, while 7.61 km^{2} (2.94 sq mi) or 66.5% is forested. Of the rest of the land, 0.37 km^{2} (0.14 sq mi) or 3.2% is settled (buildings or roads), 0.01 km^{2} (2.5 acres) or 0.1% is either rivers or lakes.

Of the built up area, housing and buildings made up 0.8% and transportation infrastructure made up 2.0%. Out of the forested land, 63.1% of the total land area is heavily forested and 3.4% is covered with orchards or small clusters of trees. Of the agricultural land, 1.0% is used for growing crops and 14.6% is pastures and 13.7% is used for alpine pastures. All the water in the municipality is flowing water.

The former municipality is located in the Thal district, south of ancient Balsthal-Moutier road.

== Coat of arms ==
The blazon of the municipal coat of arms is Vert three Geese Argent.

== Demographics ==
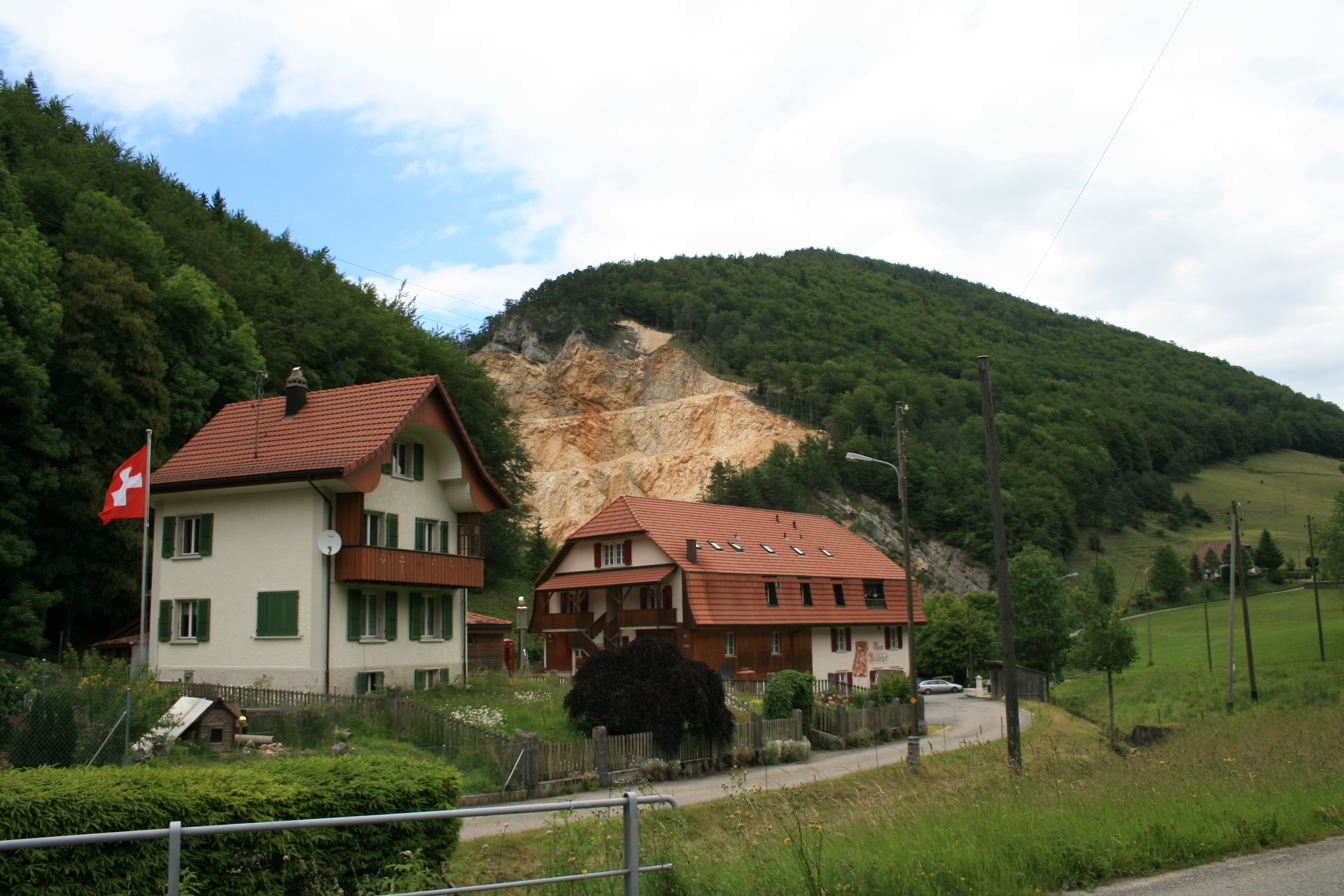
Houses near the quarry

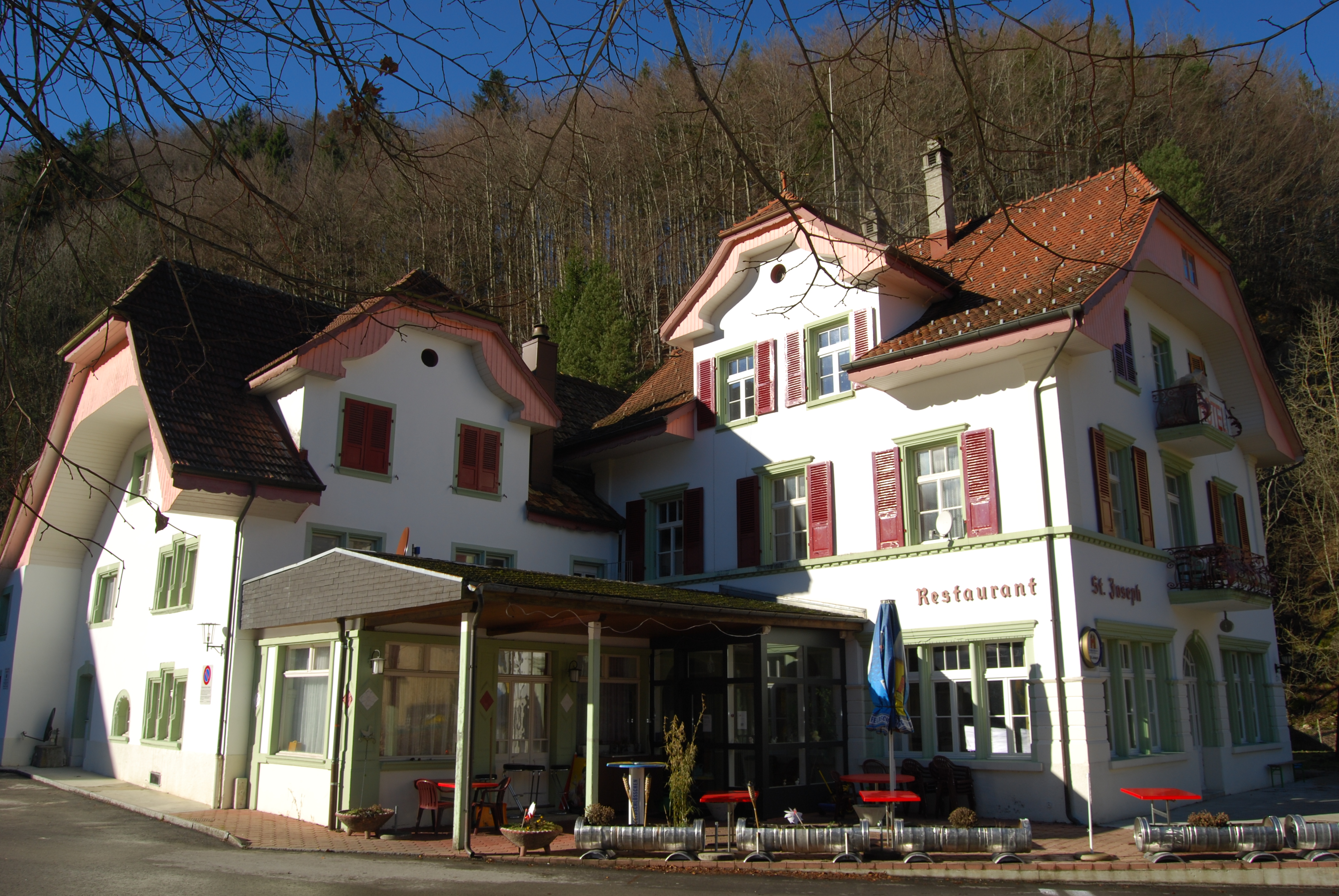
Hotel and restaurant St. Joseph

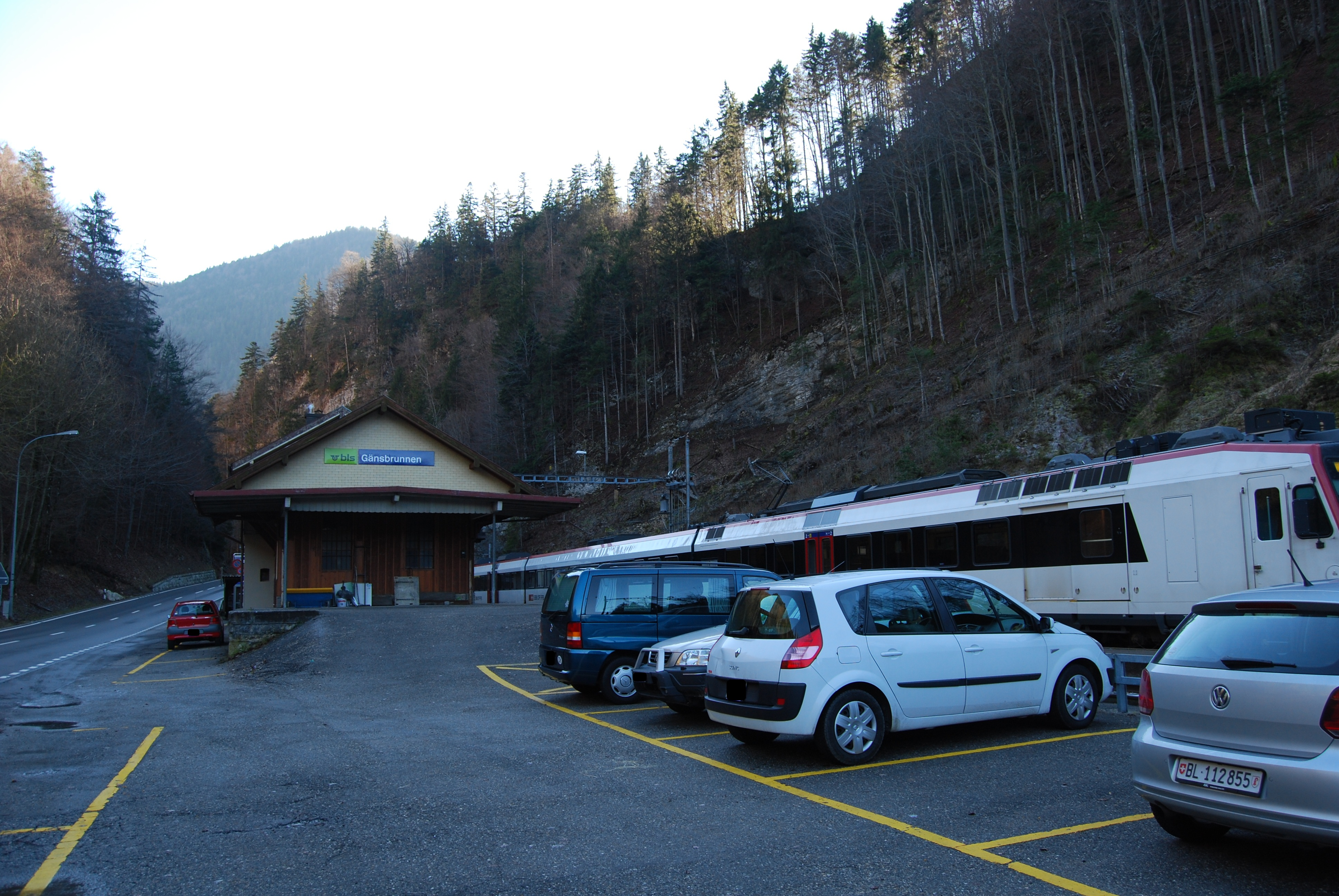
Gänsbrunnen train station

Gänsbrunnen had a population (as of 2019) of 82. As of 2008, 1.0% of the population are resident foreign nationals. Over the last 10 years (1999–2009 ) the population has changed at a rate of -1.1%.

Most of the population (as of 2000) speaks German (80 or 95.2%) with the rest speaking French

As of 2008, the gender distribution of the population was 48.5% male and 51.5% female. The population was made up of 44 Swiss men (45.4% of the population) and 3 (3.1%) non-Swiss men. There were 48 Swiss women (49.5%) and 2 (2.1%) non-Swiss women. Of the population in the municipality 25 or about 29.8% were born in Gänsbrunnen and lived there in 2000. There were 23 or 27.4% who were born in the same canton, while 30 or 35.7% were born somewhere else in Switzerland, and 5 or 6.0% were born outside of Switzerland.

In 2008 there was 1 live birth to Swiss citizens. Ignoring immigration and emigration, the population of Swiss citizens increased by 1 while the foreign population remained the same. There was 1 non-Swiss man who immigrated from another country to Switzerland and 1 non-Swiss woman who emigrated from Switzerland to another country. The total Swiss population change in 2008 (from all sources, including moves across municipal borders) was an increase of 4 and the non-Swiss population remained the same. This represents a population growth rate of 4.1%.

The age distribution, as of 2000, in Gänsbrunnen is; 5 children or 6.0% of the population are between 0 and 6 years old and 17 teenagers or 20.2% are between 7 and 19. Of the adult population, 6 people or 7.1% of the population are between 20 and 24 years old. 25 people or 29.8% are between 25 and 44, and 18 people or 21.4% are between 45 and 64. The senior population distribution is 9 people or 10.7% of the population are between 65 and 79 years old and there are 4 people or 4.8% who are over 80.

As of 2000, there were 38 people who were single and never married in the municipality. There were 36 married individuals, 6 widows or widowers and 4 individuals who are divorced.

As of 2000, there were 31 private households in the municipality, and an average of 2.5 persons per household. There were 8 households that consist of only one person and 3 households with five or more people. Out of a total of 33 households that answered this question, 24.2% were households made up of just one person and there were 3 adults who lived with their parents. Of the rest of the households, there are 8 married couples without children, 10 married couples with children There were 2 single parents with a child or children.

In 2000 there were 12 single family homes (or 36.4% of the total) out of a total of 33 inhabited buildings. There were 1 multi-family buildings (3.0%), along with 14 multi-purpose buildings that were mostly used for housing (42.4%) and 6 other use buildings (commercial or industrial) that also had some housing (18.2%). Of the single family homes 4 were built before 1919, while none were built between 1990 and 2000.

In 2000 there were 42 apartments in the municipality. The most common apartment size was 4 rooms of which there were 15. There were 1 single room apartments and 15 apartments with five or more rooms. Of these apartments, a total of 31 apartments (73.8% of the total) were permanently occupied, while 10 apartments (23.8%) were seasonally occupied and 1 apartments (2.4%) were empty. As of 2009, the construction rate of new housing units was 0 new units per 1000 residents. The vacancy rate for the municipality, in 2010, was 0%.

The historical population is given in the following chart:

== Politics ==
In the 2007 federal election the most popular party was the FDP which received 48.05% of the vote. The next three most popular parties were the SVP (26.84%), the EVP Party (12.55%) and the CVP (12.12%). In the federal election, a total of 33 votes were cast, and the voter turnout was 50.8%.

== Economy ==
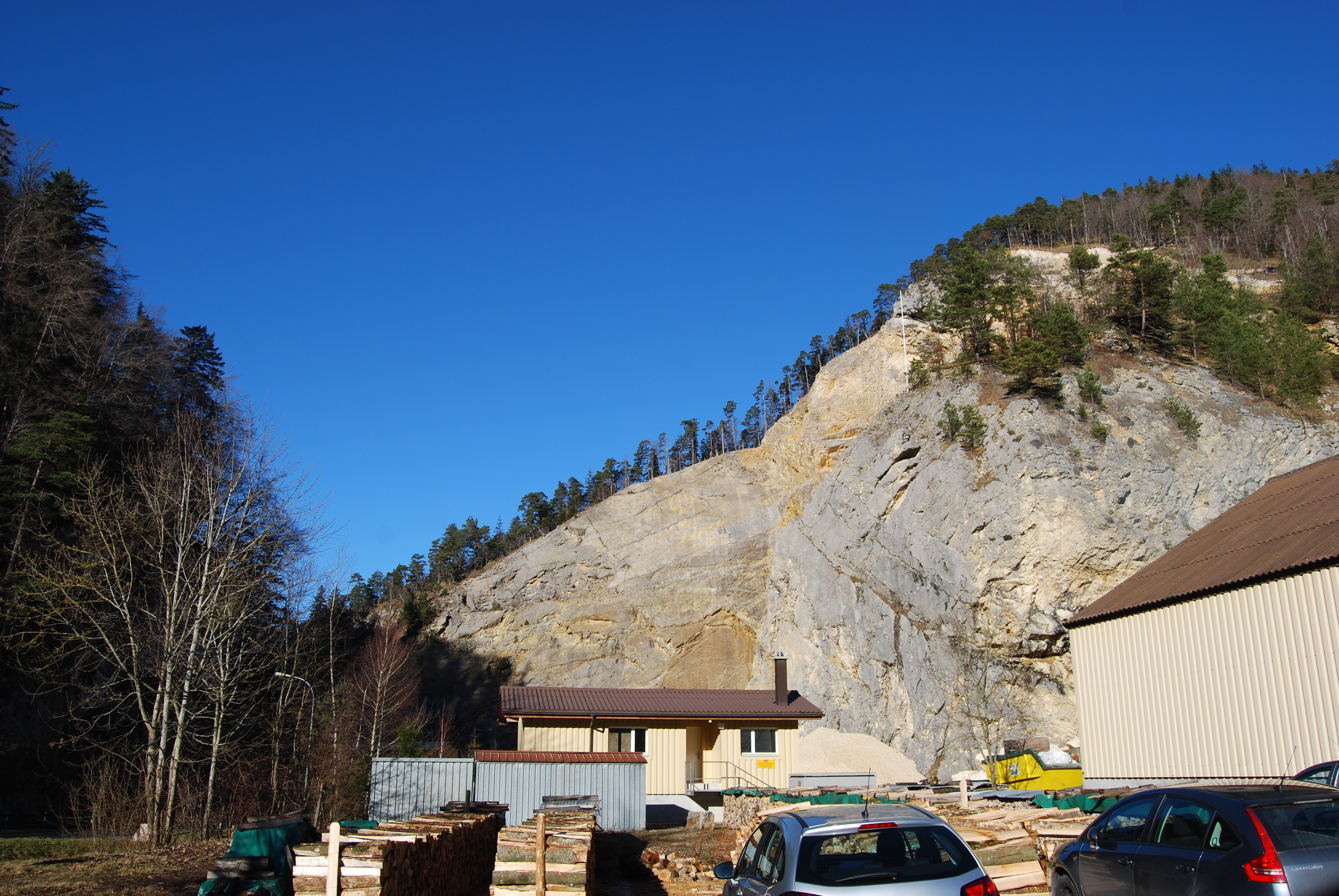
Quarry in Gänsbrunnen

As of 2010, Gänsbrunnen had an unemployment rate of 4.4%. As of 2008, there were 23 people employed in the primary economic sector and about 8 businesses involved in this sector. 2 people were employed in the secondary sector and there was 1 business in this sector. 10 people were employed in the tertiary sector, with 2 businesses in this sector. There were 51 residents of the municipality who were employed in some capacity, of which females made up 45.1% of the workforce.

In 2008 the total number of full-time equivalent jobs was 25. The number of jobs in the primary sector was 17, all of which were in agriculture. The number of jobs in the secondary sector was 2, both in mining. The number of jobs in the tertiary sector was 6, all in a hotel or restaurant.

In 2000, there were 5 workers who commuted into the municipality and 25 workers who commuted away. The municipality is a net exporter of workers, with about 5.0 workers leaving the municipality for every one entering. Of the working population, 21.6% used public transportation to get to work, and 29.4% used a private car.

== Religion ==
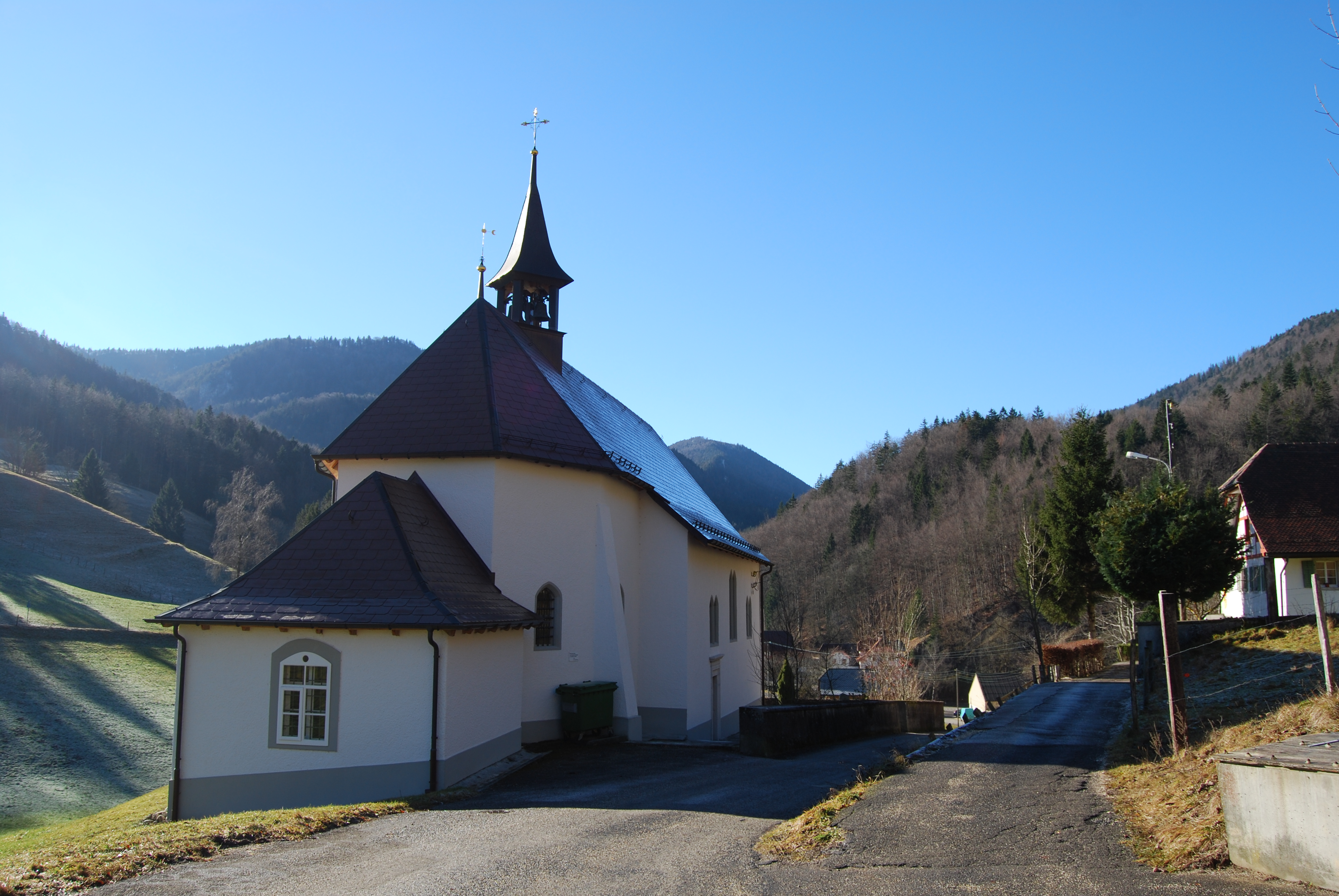
Church of Gänsbrunnen

From the 2000 census, 28 or 33.3% were Roman Catholic, while 32 or 38.1% belonged to the Swiss Reformed Church. Of the rest of the population, and there were 12 individuals (or about 14.29% of the population) who belonged to another Christian church. 11 (or about 13.10% of the population) belonged to no church, are agnostic or atheist, and 1 individuals (or about 1.19% of the population) did not answer the question.

== Education ==
In Gänsbrunnen about 37 or (44.0%) of the population have completed non-mandatory upper secondary education, and 6 or (7.1%) have completed additional higher education (either university or a Fachhochschule). Of the 6 who completed tertiary schooling, 66.7% were Swiss men, 33.3% were Swiss women.

As of 2000, there were 12 students from Gänsbrunnen who attended schools outside the municipality.
