= Welschenrohr =

- Former municipality
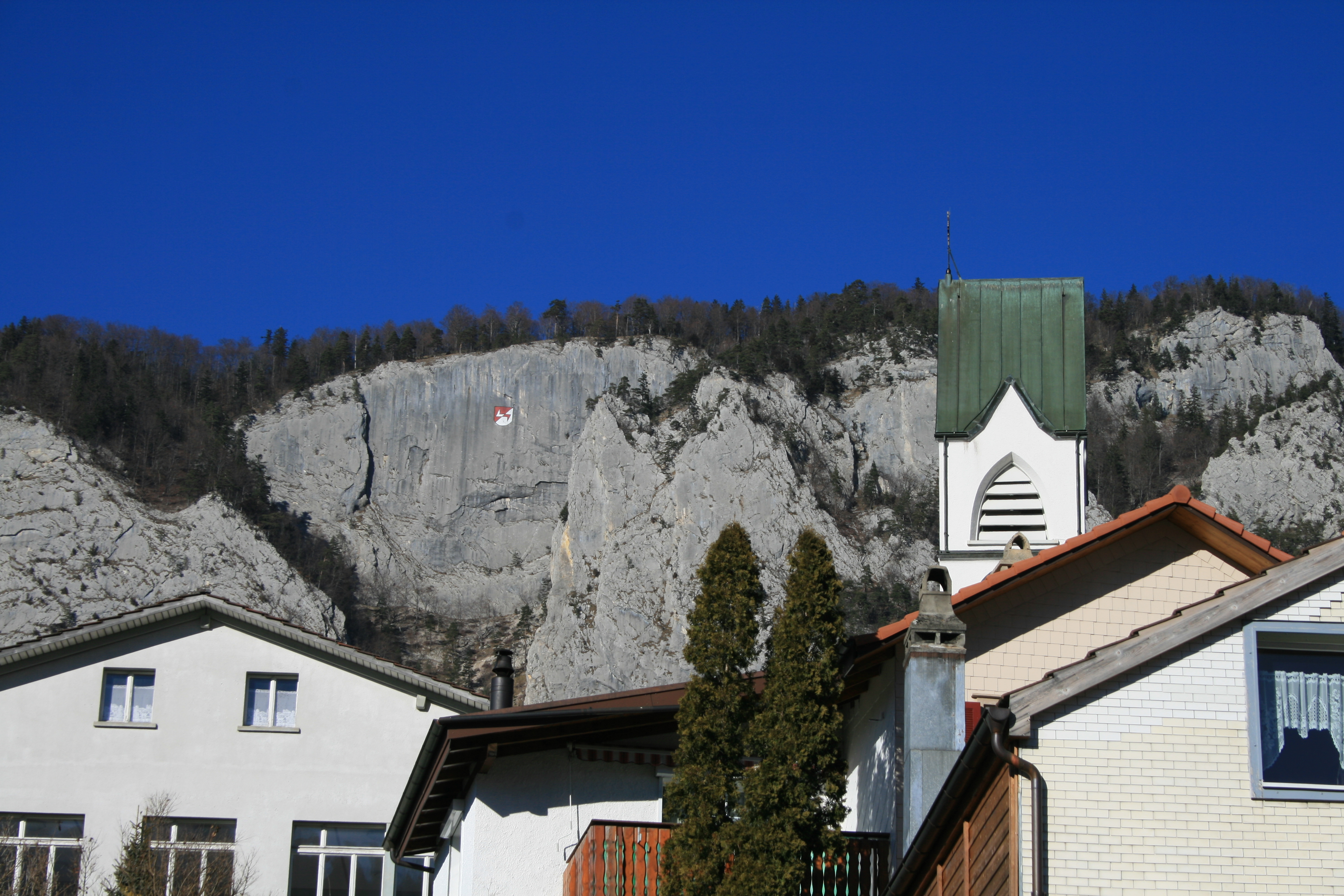
- Welschenrohr village

- Coat of arms
- Location of Welschenrohr
- Location within Switzerland Location within Canton of Solothurn
- Coordinates: 47°17′N 7°32′E
- Country: Switzerland
- Canton: Solothurn
- District: Thal

Area
  - Total: 12.99 km^{2} (5.02 sq mi)
- Elevation: 680 m (2,230 ft)

Population (December 2019)
  - Total: 1,076
  - Density: 82.83/km^{2} (214.5/sq mi)
- Time zone: UTC+01:00 (CET)
  - Summer (DST): UTC+02:00 (CEST)
- Postal code: 4716
- SFOS number: 2429
- ISO 3166 code: CH-SO
- Surrounded by: Balm bei Günsberg, Gänsbrunnen, Herbetswil, Oberdorf, Rüttenen
- Website: welschenrohr.ch

Welschenrohr (French: Rosières) is a former municipality in the district of Thal in the canton of Solothurn in Switzerland. On 1 January 2021 the former municipalities of Gänsbrunnen and Welschenrohr merged to form the new municipality of Welschenrohr-Gänsbrunnen.

== History ==
Welschenrohr is first mentioned in 1179 as Rore. An important watch manufacturing place up to the 1960s, its economy was heavily affected by the late 1960s watch crisis. Now, its economy specializes in fine mechanics.

== Geography ==
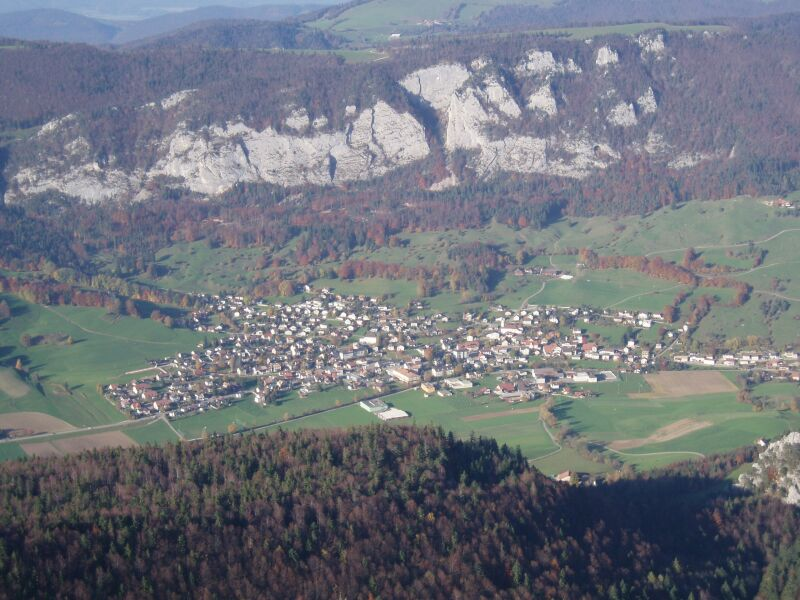
Welschenrohr

Aerial view (1962)

Welschenrohr had an area, as of 2009, of 12.99 square kilometers (5.02 sq mi). Of this area, 4.61 km^{2} (1.78 sq mi) or 35.5% is used for agricultural purposes, while 7.58 km^{2} (2.93 sq mi) or 58.4% is forested. Of the rest of the land, 0.64 km^{2} (0.25 sq mi) or 4.9% is settled (buildings or roads), 0.03 km^{2} (7.4 acres) or 0.2% is either rivers or lakes and 0.11 km^{2} (27 acres) or 0.8% is unproductive land.

Of the built up area, housing and buildings made up 2.7% and transportation infrastructure made up 2.0%. Out of the forested land, 56.0% of the total land area is heavily forested and 2.4% is covered with orchards or small clusters of trees. Of the agricultural land, 7.3% is used for growing crops and 24.1% is pastures and 3.8% is used for alpine pastures. All the water in the municipality is flowing water.

The former municipality is located in the Thal district, along the road between Balsthal and Moutier. It consists of the haufendorf village (an irregular, unplanned and quite closely packed village, built around a central square) of Welschenrohr. It is located in the Jura Mountains.

== Coat of arms ==
The blazon of the municipal coat of arms is Per bend sinister Gules and Argent a Cramp fesswise counterchanged.

== Demographics ==
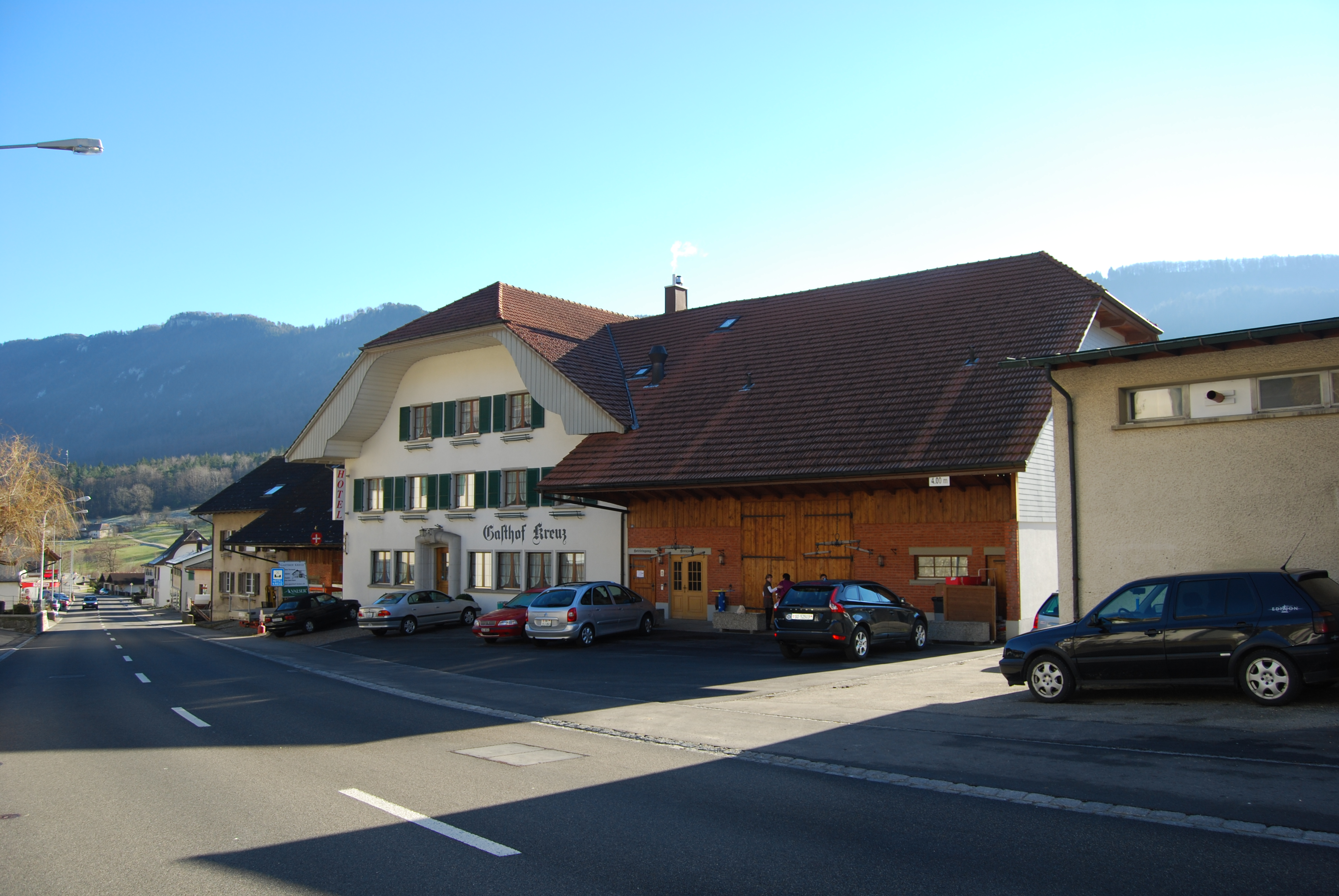
Gasthof Kreuz in Welschenrohr

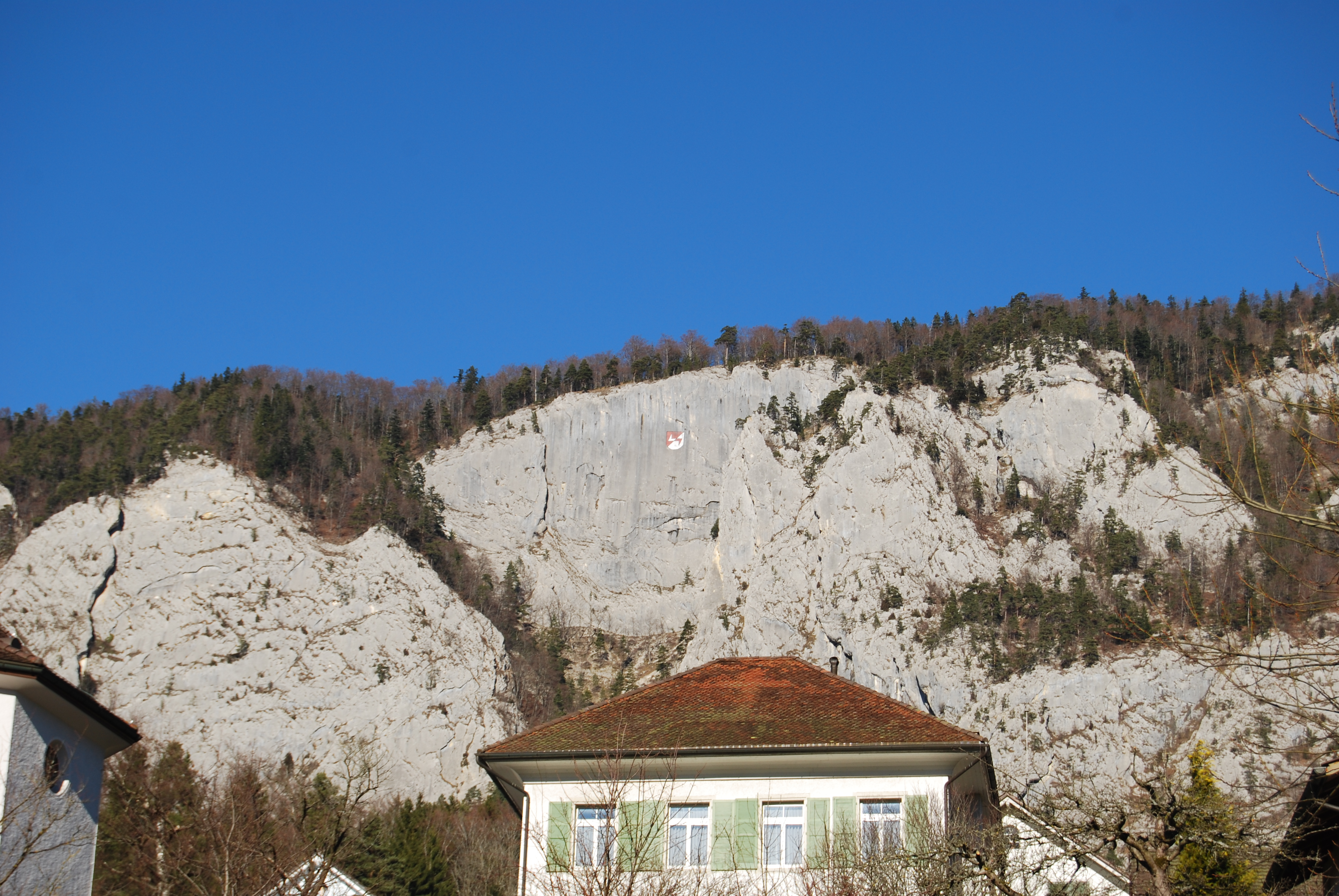
Fluh mountains at Welschenrohr

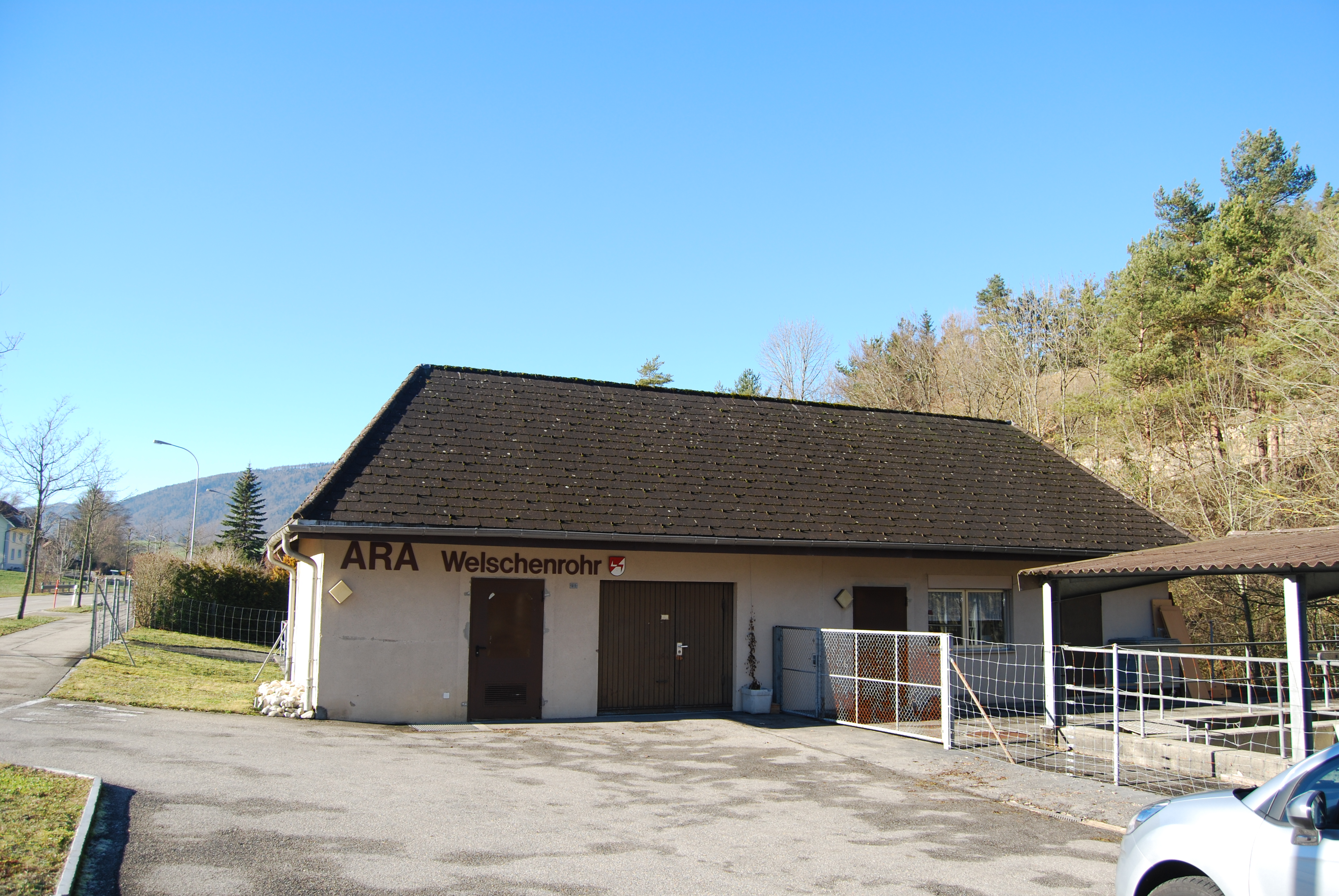
Wastewater treatment plant of Welschenrohr

Welschenrohr had a population (as of 2019) of 1,076. As of 2008, 6.6% of the population are resident foreign nationals. Over the last 10 years (1999–2009 ) the population has changed at a rate of -6.3%. Over the same time period the population has changed at a rate of -4.7% due to migration and at a rate of -3.5% due to births and deaths.

Most of the population (as of 2000) speaks German (1,105 or 94.4%), with Albanian being second most common (18 or 1.5%) and French being third (10 or 0.9%). There is 1 person who speaks Romansh.

As of 2008, the gender distribution of the population was 50.4% male and 49.6% female. The population was made up of 527 Swiss men (46.1% of the population) and 49 (4.3%) non-Swiss men. There were 525 Swiss women (46.0%) and 41 (3.6%) non-Swiss women. Of the population in the municipality 616 or about 52.6% were born in Welschenrohr and lived there in 2000. There were 179 or 15.3% who were born in the same canton, while 227 or 19.4% were born somewhere else in Switzerland, and 101 or 8.6% were born outside of Switzerland.

In 2008 there were 5 live births to Swiss citizens and 1 birth to non-Swiss citizens, and in same time span there were 8 deaths of Swiss citizens and 1 non-Swiss citizen death. Ignoring immigration and emigration, the population of Swiss citizens decreased by 3 while the foreign population remained the same. There were 2 Swiss men who immigrated back to Switzerland and 3 Swiss women who emigrated from Switzerland. At the same time, there were 4 non-Swiss men and 3 non-Swiss women who immigrated from another country to Switzerland. The total Swiss population change in 2008 (from all sources, including moves across municipal borders) was a decrease of 18 and the non-Swiss population decreased by 1 people. This represents a population growth rate of -1.7%.

The age distribution, as of 2000, in Welschenrohr is; 88 children or 7.5% of the population are between 0 and 6 years old and 206 teenagers or 17.6% are between 7 and 19. Of the adult population, 53 people or 4.5% of the population are between 20 and 24 years old. 304 people or 26.0% are between 25 and 44, and 252 people or 21.5% are between 45 and 64. The senior population distribution is 210 people or 17.9% of the population are between 65 and 79 years old and there are 58 people or 5.0% who are over 80.

As of 2000, there were 458 people who were single and never married in the municipality. There were 579 married individuals, 91 widows or widowers and 43 individuals who are divorced.

As of 2000, there were 471 private households in the municipality, and an average of 2.5 persons per household. There were 132 households that consist of only one person and 47 households with five or more people. Out of a total of 478 households that answered this question, 27.6% were households made up of just one person and there were 10 adults who lived with their parents. Of the rest of the households, there are 148 married couples without children, 155 married couples with children There were 18 single parents with a child or children. There were 8 households that were made up of unrelated people and 7 households that were made up of some sort of institution or another collective housing.

In 2000 there were 251 single family homes (or 67.8% of the total) out of a total of 370 inhabited buildings. There were 60 multi-family buildings (16.2%), along with 42 multi-purpose buildings that were mostly used for housing (11.4%) and 17 other use buildings (commercial or industrial) that also had some housing (4.6%). Of the single family homes 30 were built before 1919, while 20 were built between 1990 and 2000. The greatest number of single family homes (79) were built between 1946 and 1960.

In 2000 there were 539 apartments in the municipality. The most common apartment size was 4 rooms of which there were 163. There were 9 single room apartments and 213 apartments with five or more rooms. Of these apartments, a total of 460 apartments (85.3% of the total) were permanently occupied, while 28 apartments (5.2%) were seasonally occupied and 51 apartments (9.5%) were empty. As of 2009, the construction rate of new housing units was 0 new units per 1000 residents. The vacancy rate for the municipality, in 2010, was 4.42%.

The historical population is given in the following chart:

== Politics ==
In the 2007 federal election the most popular party was the SVP which received 29.71% of the vote. The next three most popular parties were the CVP (28.7%), the FDP (25.44%) and the SP (10.33%). In the federal election, a total of 472 votes were cast, and the voter turnout was 54.3%.

== Economy ==
As of 2010, Welschenrohr had an unemployment rate of 3.6%. As of 2008, there were 44 people employed in the primary economic sector and about 16 businesses involved in this sector. 182 people were employed in the secondary sector and there were 16 businesses in this sector. 115 people were employed in the tertiary sector, with 24 businesses in this sector. There were 566 residents of the municipality who were employed in some capacity, of which females made up 45.6% of the workforce.

In 2008 the total number of full-time equivalent jobs was 263. The number of jobs in the primary sector was 33, of which 32 were in agriculture and 1 was in forestry or lumber production. The number of jobs in the secondary sector was 158 of which 143 or (90.5%) were in manufacturing and 15 (9.5%) were in construction. The number of jobs in the tertiary sector was 72. In the tertiary sector; 9 or 12.5% were in wholesale or retail sales or the repair of motor vehicles, 6 or 8.3% were in the movement and storage of goods, 9 or 12.5% were in a hotel or restaurant, 10 or 13.9% were the insurance or financial industry, 1 was a technical professional or scientist, 8 or 11.1% were in education and 13 or 18.1% were in health care.

In 2000, there were 124 workers who commuted into the municipality and 274 workers who commuted away. The municipality is a net exporter of workers, with about 2.2 workers leaving the municipality for every one entering. Of the working population, 15.7% used public transportation to get to work, and 42.6% used a private car.

== Religion ==
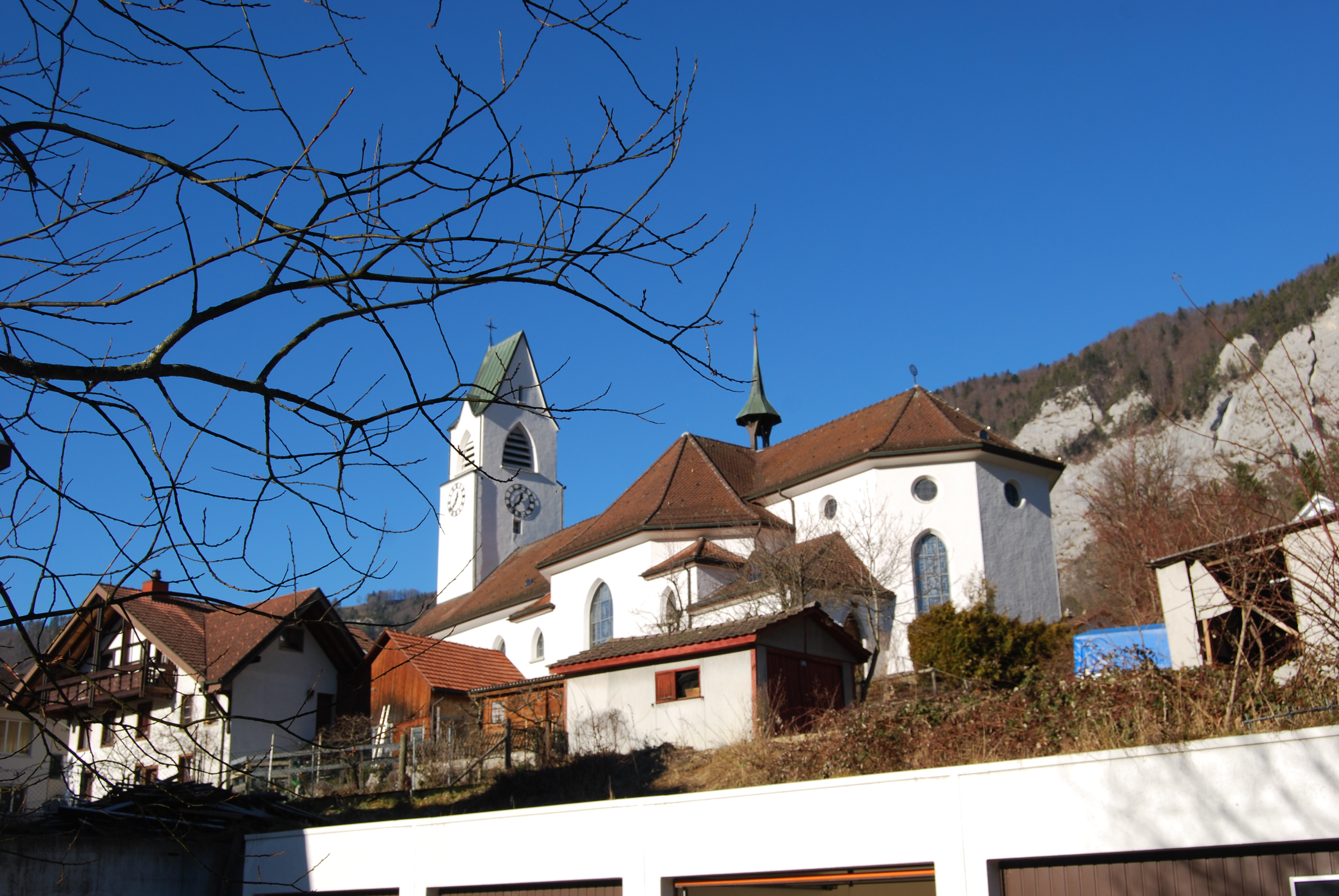
Village church

From the 2000 census, 720 or 61.5% were Roman Catholic, while 296 or 25.3% belonged to the Swiss Reformed Church. Of the rest of the population, there were 4 members of an Orthodox church (or about 0.34% of the population), there were 4 individuals (or about 0.34% of the population) who belonged to the Christian Catholic Church, and there were 15 individuals (or about 1.28% of the population) who belonged to another Christian church. There were 48 (or about 4.10% of the population) who were Islamic. There was 1 person who was Buddhist, 9 individuals who were Hindu and 2 individuals who belonged to another church. 61 (or about 5.21% of the population) belonged to no church, are agnostic or atheist, and 11 individuals (or about 0.94% of the population) did not answer the question.

== Education ==
In Welschenrohr about 442 or (37.7%) of the population have completed non-mandatory upper secondary education, and 56 or (4.8%) have completed additional higher education (either university or a Fachhochschule). Of the 56 who completed tertiary schooling, 78.6% were Swiss men, 10.7% were Swiss women, 8.9% were non-Swiss men.

During the 2010-2011 school year there were a total of 107 students in the Welschenrohr school system. The education system in the Canton of Solothurn allows young children to attend two years of non-obligatory Kindergarten. During that school year, there were 21 children in kindergarten. The canton's school system requires students to attend six years of primary school, with some of the children attending smaller, specialized classes. In the municipality there were 86 students in primary school. The secondary school program consists of three lower, obligatory years of schooling, followed by three to five years of optional, advanced schools. All the lower secondary students from Welschenrohr attend their school in a neighboring municipality.

As of 2000, there were 16 students in Welschenrohr who came from another municipality, while 66 residents attended schools outside the municipality.
