= Farnern =

- Municipality
- Flag Coat of arms
- Location of Farnern
- Location within Switzerland Location within Canton of Bern
- Coordinates: 47°16′N 7°37′E
- Country: Switzerland
- Canton: Bern
- District: Oberaargau

Government
  - Mayor: Roland Guazzini

Area
  - Total: 3.7 km^{2} (1.4 sq mi)
- Elevation: 800 m (2,600 ft)

Population (Dec 2012)
  - Total: 207
  - Density: 56/km^{2} (140/sq mi)
- Time zone: UTC+01:00 (CET)
  - Summer (DST): UTC+02:00 (CEST)
- Postal code: 4539
- SFOS number: 975
- ISO 3166 code: CH-BE
- Surrounded by: Aedermannsdorf (SO), Attiswil, Günsberg (SO), Herbetswil (SO), Rumisberg
- Website: www.farnern.ch

Farnern is a municipality in the Oberaargau administrative district in the canton of Bern in Switzerland.

== History ==
Aerial view (1972)

Farnern is first mentioned in 1329 as Varnerron.

The oldest trace of a settlement in the area are some Iron Age and Roman era coins which were found around Schmiedenmatt and Bettlerküche. The coins were probably offerings to an unknown shrine in the nearby mountain pass. During the Middle Ages the village was part of the court of Oberbipp. When Oberbipp was acquired by Bern, Farnern became part of the Bernese bailiwick of Bipp and the parish of Oberbipp.

Traditionally the local farmers practiced subsistence farming but raised a few crops for export. In the 19th century they shifted to raising cattle for meat and milk. In 1876 there were enough dairy farmers in the village to support a local dairy and cheese factory. Today, agriculture still provides about half of the local jobs, but most residents now commute to jobs in Solothurn or other nearby towns. Due to falling primary school enrollment, in 1975 the municipality formed the Farnern-Rumisberg-Wolfisberg school district, with a small school house in each municipality.

== Geography ==
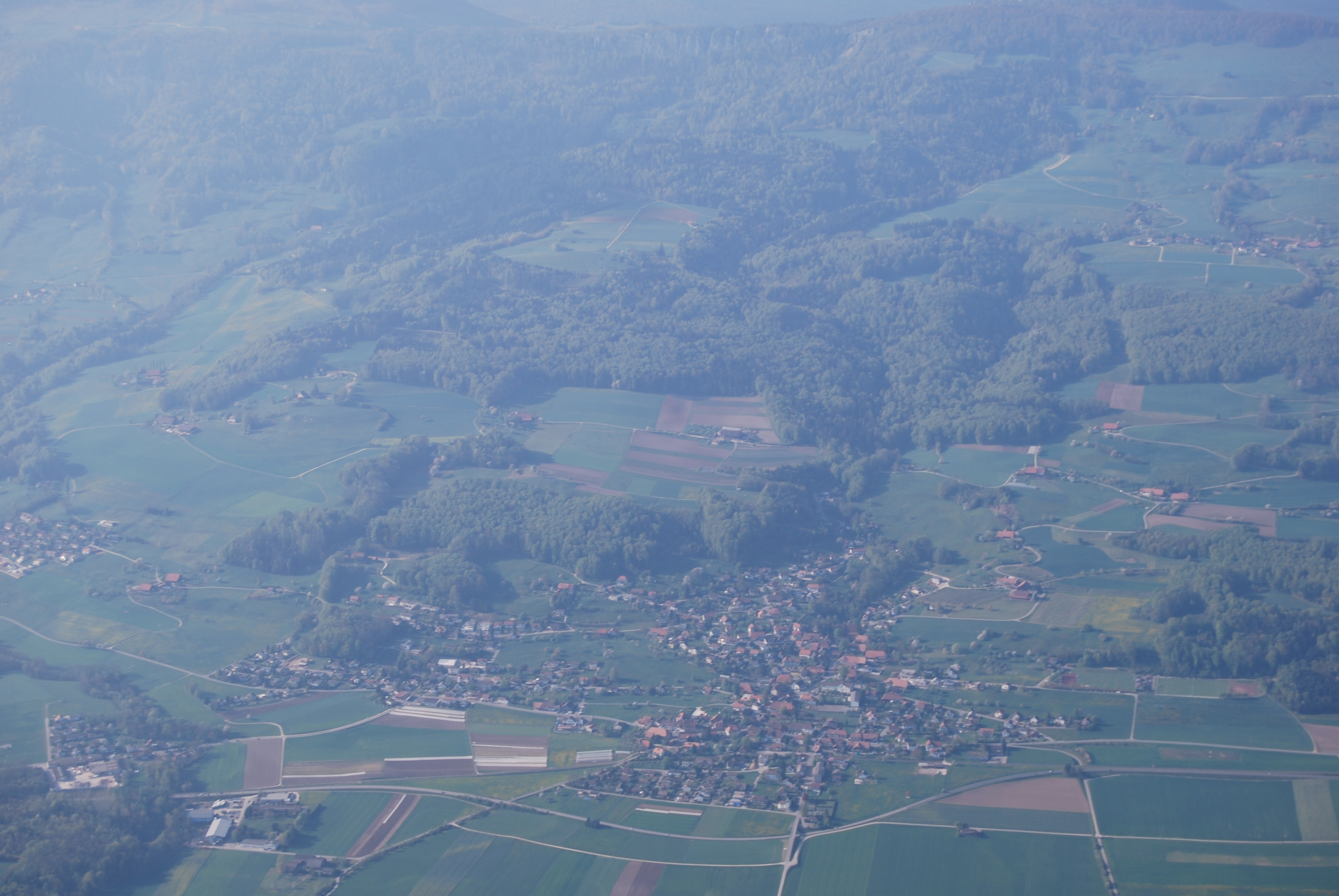
Aerial view of the area around Farnern. Farnern village is visible in the upper right third of the picture.

Farnern has an area of 3.68 km^{2} (1.42 sq mi). As of the 2005 survey, a total of 2.39 km^{2} (0.92 mi^{2}) or 64.8% is used for agricultural purposes, while 1.1 km^{2} (0.42 mi^{2}) or 29.8% is forested. Of rest of the municipality 0.16 km^{2} (0.062 mi^{2}) or 4.3% is settled (buildings or roads).

From the same survey, housing and buildings made up 2.4% and transportation infrastructure made up 1.9%. A total of 26.0% of the total land area is heavily forested and 3.8% is covered with orchards or small clusters of trees. Of the agricultural land, 9.2% is used for growing crops and 25.5% is pasturage, while 2.2% is used for orchards or vine crops and 27.9% is used for alpine pastures.

The municipality is located on a terrace on the southern slope of the Jura Mountains and includes the village of Farnern and scattered farm houses.

On 31 December 2009 Amtsbezirk Wangen, the municipality's former district, was dissolved. On the following day, 1 January 2010, it joined the newly created Verwaltungskreis Oberaargau.

== Coat of arms ==
The blazon of the municipal coat of arms is Argent three Fern Leaves issuant from a Mount of 3 Coupeaux Vert. The fern leaves make this an example of canting arms.

== Demographics ==
Farnern has a population (as of December 2020) of 227. As of 2012, 7.2% of the population are resident foreign nationals. Between the last 2 years (2010-2012) the population changed at a rate of 2.5%. Migration accounted for 0.0%, while births and deaths accounted for 0.5%.

Most of the population (as of 2000) speaks German (218 or 98.6%) as their first language with the rest speaking French.

As of 2013, the population was 47.8% male and 52.2% female. The population was made up of 92 Swiss men (44.4% of the population) and 7 (3.4%) non-Swiss men. There were 102 Swiss women (49.3%) and 6 (2.9%) non-Swiss women. Of the population in the municipality, 77 or about 34.8% were born in Farnern and lived there in 2000. There were 70 or 31.7% who were born in the same canton, while 60 or 27.1% were born somewhere else in Switzerland, and 11 or 5.0% were born outside of Switzerland.

As of 2012, children and teenagers (0–19 years old) make up 16.9% of the population, while adults (20–64 years old) make up 57.0% and seniors (over 64 years old) make up 26.1%.

As of 2000, there were 92 people who were single and never married in the municipality. There were 110 married individuals, 7 widows or widowers and 12 individuals who are divorced.

As of 2010, there were 22 households that consist of only one person and 1 households with five or more people. In 2000, a total of 85 apartments (70.8% of the total) were permanently occupied, while 30 apartments (25.0%) were seasonally occupied and 5 apartments (4.2%) were empty. The vacancy rate for the municipality, in 2013, was 0.8%. In 2012, single family homes made up 61.6% of the total housing in the municipality.

The historical population is given in the following chart:

== Economy ==
As of 2011, Farnern had an unemployment rate of 1.81%. As of 2011, there were a total of 75 people employed in the municipality. Of these, there were 35 people employed in the primary economic sector and about 12 businesses involved in this sector. The secondary sector employs 2 people and there was 1 business in this sector. The tertiary sector employs 38 people, with 14 businesses in this sector. There were 124 residents of the municipality who were employed in some capacity, of which females made up 50.0% of the workforce.

In 2008 there were a total of 55 full-time equivalent jobs. The number of jobs in the primary sector was 21, all of which were in agriculture. There were no jobs in the secondary sector. The number of jobs in the tertiary sector was 34. In the tertiary sector; 2 or 5.9% were in wholesale or retail sales or the repair of motor vehicles, 5 or 14.7% were in a hotel or restaurant, 22 or 64.7% were in the information industry, 4 or 11.8% were in education.

In 2000, there were 12 workers who commuted into the municipality and 90 workers who commuted away. The municipality is a net exporter of workers, with about 7.5 workers leaving the municipality for every one entering. A total of 34 workers (73.9% of the 46 total workers in the municipality) both lived and worked in Farnern. Of the working population, 9.7% used public transportation to get to work, and 61.3% used a private car.

In 2013 the average church, local and cantonal tax rate on a married resident, with two children, of Farnern making 150,000 CHF was 11.7%, while an unmarried resident's rate was 18.0%. For comparison, the median rate for all municipalities in the entire canton was 11.7% and 18.1%, while the nationwide median was 10.6% and 17.4% respectively. In 2011 there were a total of 82 tax payers in the municipality. Of that total, 22 made over 75,000 CHF per year. The average income of the over 75,000 CHF group in Farnern was 134,336 CHF, while the average across all of Switzerland was 136,785 CHF.

In 2011 a total of 1.8% of the population received direct financial assistance from the government.

== Politics ==
In the 2011 federal election the most popular party was the Swiss People's Party (SVP) which received 49.6% of the vote. The next three most popular parties were the Social Democratic Party (SP) (19.7%), the Conservative Democratic Party (BDP) (10.6%) and the FDP.The Liberals (6.4%). In the federal election, a total of 87 votes were cast, and the voter turnout was 50.6%.

== Religion ==
From the 2000 census, 170 or 76.9% belonged to the Swiss Reformed Church, while 20 or 9.0% were Roman Catholic. Of the rest of the population, there were 2 individuals (or about 0.90% of the population) who belonged to the Christian Catholic Church. 28 (or about 12.67% of the population) belonged to no church, are agnostic or atheist, and 1 individuals (or about 0.45% of the population) did not answer the question.

== Education ==
In Farnern about 61.5% of the population have completed non-mandatory upper secondary education, and 17.9% have completed additional higher education (either university or a Fachhochschule). Of the 25 who had completed some form of tertiary schooling listed in the census, 68.0% were Swiss men, 24.0% were Swiss women.

The Canton of Bern school system provides one year of non-obligatory Kindergarten, followed by six years of Primary school. This is followed by three years of obligatory lower Secondary school where the students are separated according to ability and aptitude. Following the lower Secondary students may attend additional schooling or they may enter an apprenticeship.

During the 2012–13 school year, there were a total of 18 students attending classes in Farnern. There were a total of 18 students in the German language kindergarten classes in the municipality. Of the kindergarten students, 11.1% were permanent or temporary residents of Switzerland (not citizens) and 16.7% have a different mother language than the classroom language. The municipality's primary school had 18 students. Of the primary students, 5.6% were permanent or temporary residents of Switzerland (not citizens). The remainder of the students attend a private or special school.

As of 2000, there were a total of 21 students attending any school in the municipality. Of those, 7 both lived and attended school in the municipality, while 14 students came from another municipality. During the same year, 20 residents attended schools outside the municipality.
