= Aedermannsdorf =

- Municipality
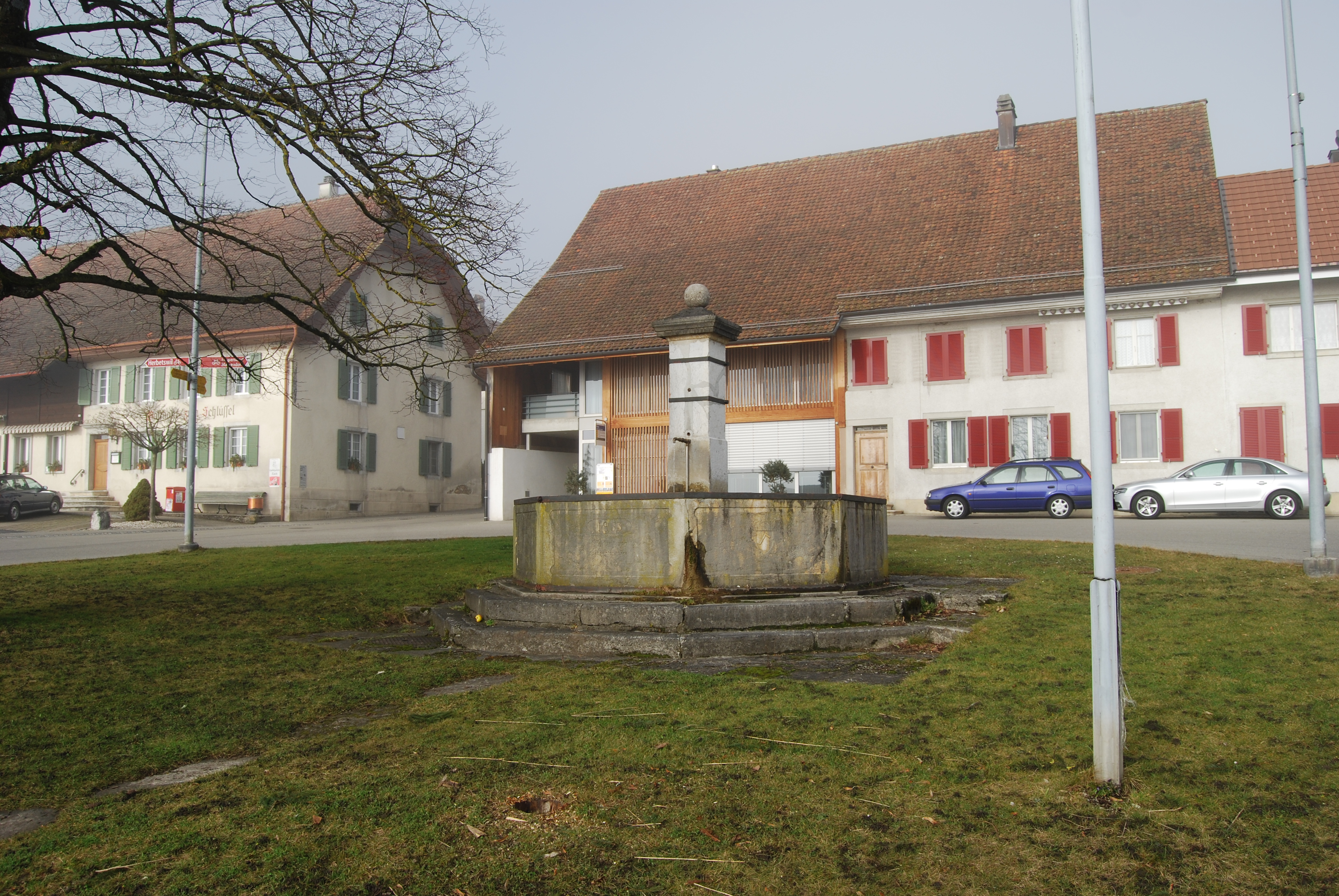
- Aedermannsdorf village

- Coat of arms
- Location of Aedermannsdorf
- Location within Switzerland Location within Canton of Solothurn
- Coordinates: 47°18′N 7°37′E
- Country: Switzerland
- Canton: Solothurn
- District: Thal

Area
  - Total: 12.88 km^{2} (4.97 sq mi)
- Elevation: 531 m (1,742 ft)

Population (December 2020)
  - Total: 581
  - Density: 45.1/km^{2} (117/sq mi)
- Time zone: UTC+01:00 (CET)
  - Summer (DST): UTC+02:00 (CEST)
- Postal code: 4714
- SFOS number: 2421
- ISO 3166 code: CH-SO
- Surrounded by: Beinwil, Farnern (BE), Herbetswil, Matzendorf, Mümliswil-Ramiswil, Rumisberg (BE), Schelten (BE), Seehof (BE), Vermes (JU)
- Website: aedermannsdorf.ch

Aedermannsdorf is a municipality in the district of Thal in the canton of Solothurn in Switzerland.

== History ==
Aedermannsdorf is first mentioned in 1308 as Odermarstorf.

== Geography ==
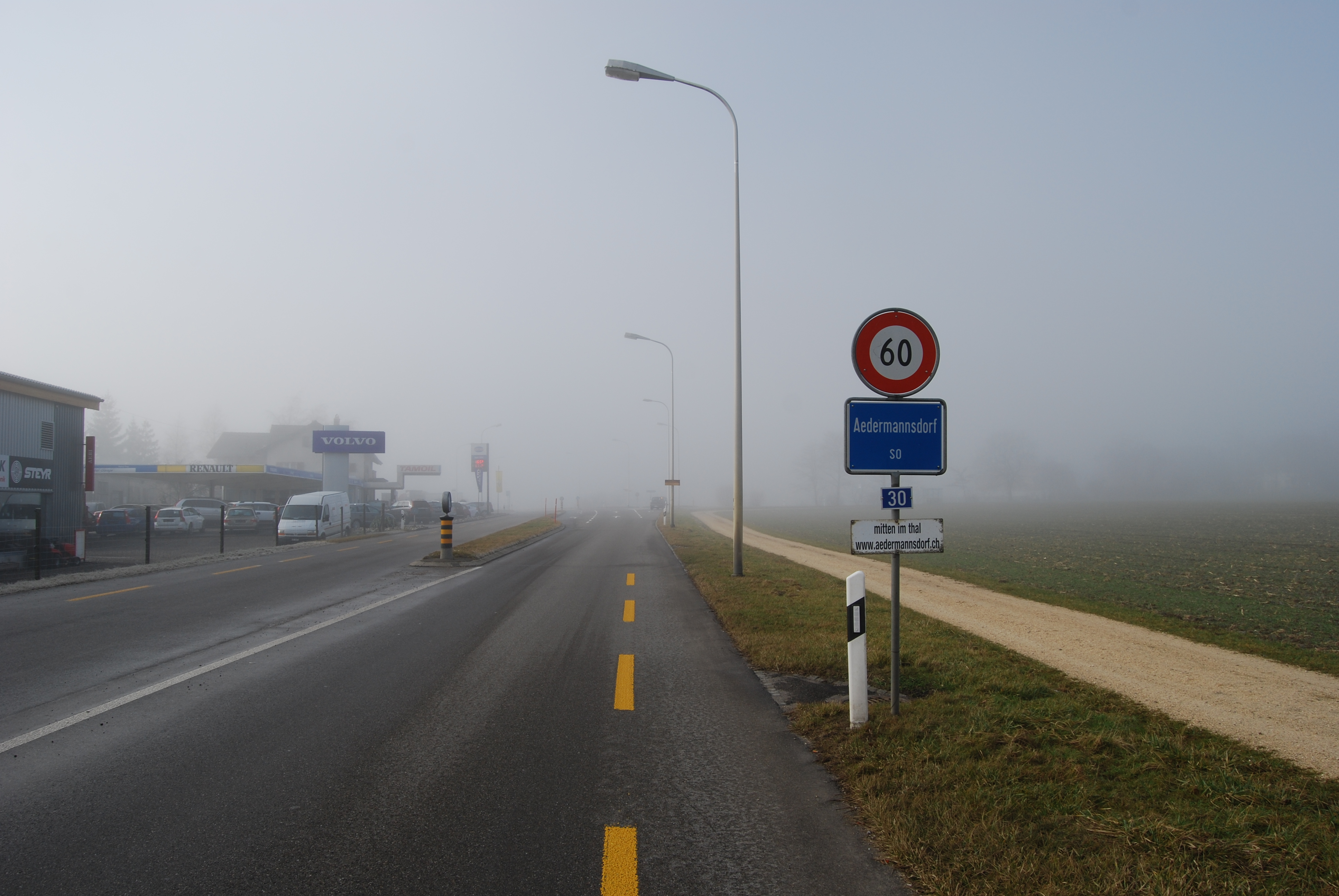
Entrance to the municipality

Aerial view (1955)

Aedermannsdorf has an area, as of 2009, of 12.88 square kilometers (4.97 sq mi). Of this area, 6.37 km^{2} (2.46 sq mi) or 49.5% is used for agricultural purposes, while 6.01 km^{2} (2.32 sq mi) or 46.7% is forested. Of the rest of the land, 0.47 km^{2} (0.18 sq mi) or 3.6% is settled (buildings or roads) and 0.04 km^{2} (9.9 acres) or 0.3% is unproductive land.

Of the built up area, housing and buildings made up 1.9% and transportation infrastructure made up 1.3%. Out of the forested land, 43.0% of the total land area is heavily forested and 3.6% is covered with orchards or small clusters of trees. Of the agricultural land, 11.6% is used for growing crops and 13.1% is pastures, while 1.1% is used for orchards or vine crops, and 23.7% is used for alpine pastures.

The municipality is located in the Thal district. It consists of the haufendorf village (an irregular, unplanned and quite closely packed village, built around a central square) of Aedermannsdorf in the Dünnern river valley (German: Dünnerntal).

== Coat of arms ==
The blazon of the municipal coat of arms is Argent an Angle Plate Gules in bend sinister.

== Demographics ==
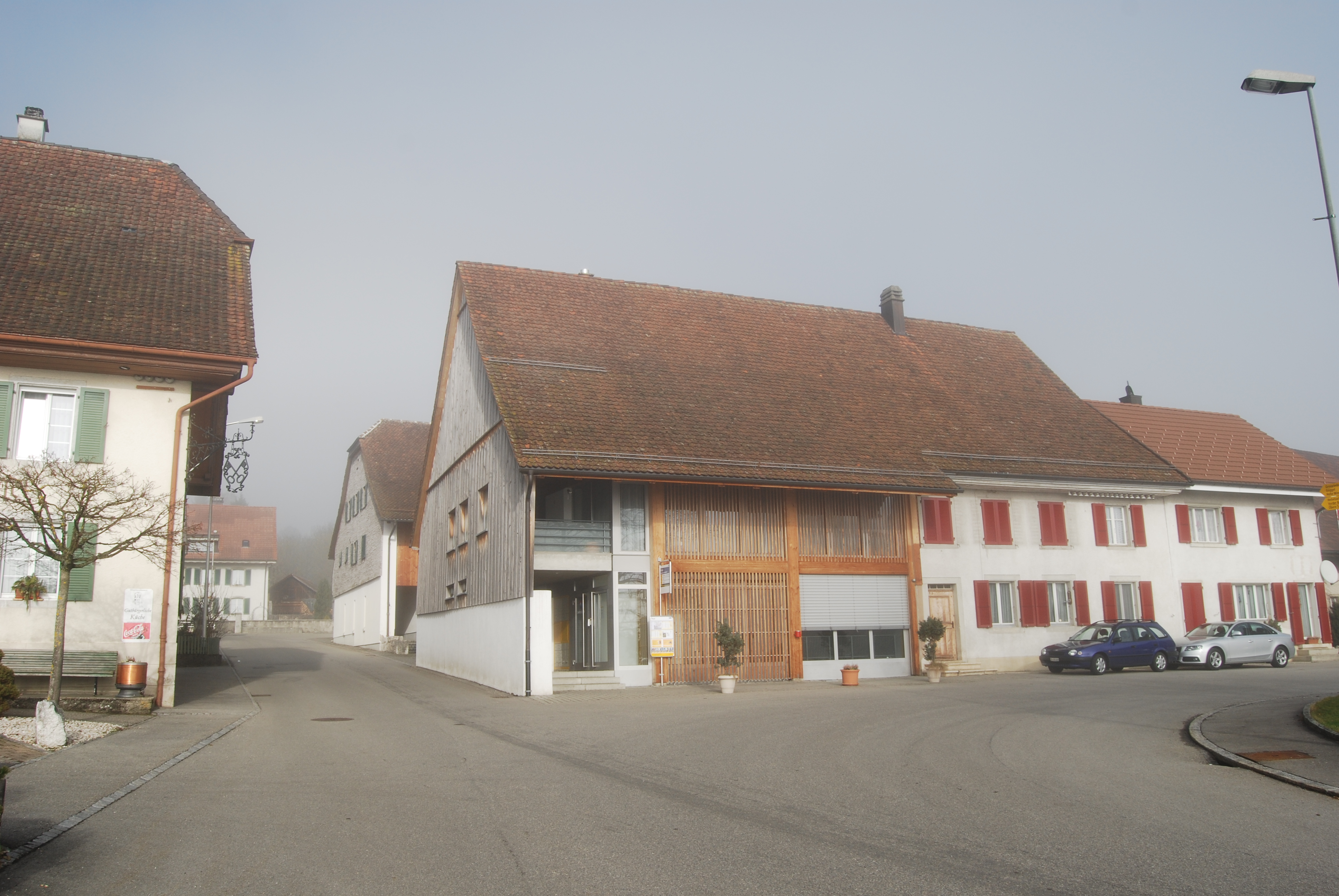
Houses in Aedermannsdorf

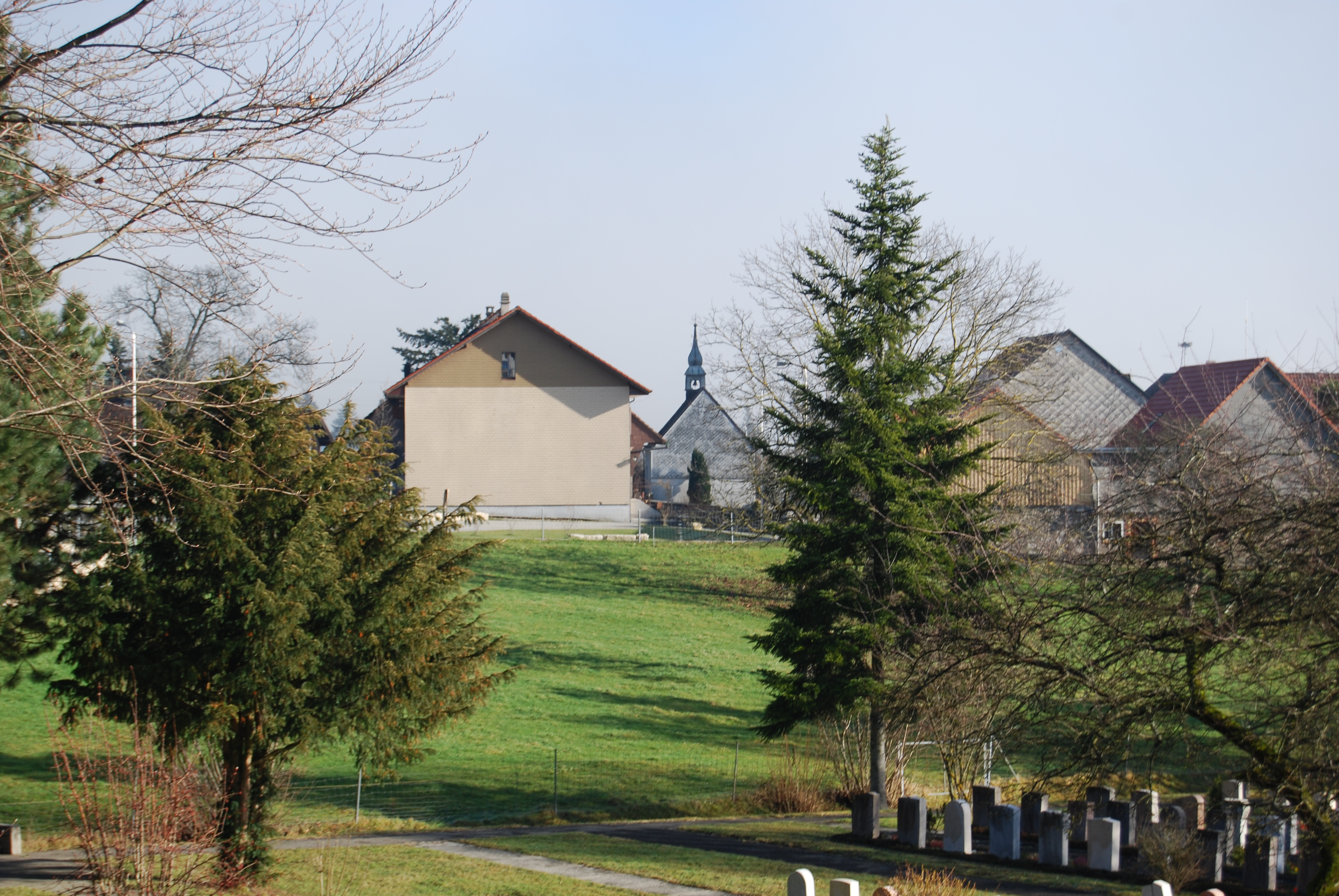
Village chapel, graveyard and houses

Aedermannsdorf has a population (as of December 2020) of 581. As of 2008, 2.5% of the population are resident foreign nationals. Over the last 10 years (1999–2009 ) the population has changed at a rate of 0.9%.

Most of the population (as of 2000) speaks German (529 or 97.4%), with Albanian being second most common (6 or 1.1%) and Serbo-Croatian being third (5 or 0.9%). There is 1 person who speaks French and 1 person who speaks Romansh.

As of 2008, the gender distribution of the population was 53.9% male and 46.1% female. The population was made up of 288 Swiss men (52.1% of the population) and 10 (1.8%) non-Swiss men. There were 254 Swiss women (45.9%) and 1 (0.2%) non-Swiss women. Of the population in the municipality 277 or about 51.0% were born in Aedermannsdorf and lived there in 2000. There were 128 or 23.6% who were born in the same canton, while 103 or 19.0% were born somewhere else in Switzerland, and 28 or 5.2% were born outside of Switzerland.

In 2008 there were 9 live births to Swiss citizens and were 7 deaths of Swiss citizens. Ignoring immigration and emigration, the population of Swiss citizens increased by 2 while the foreign population remained the same. There were 2 Swiss men who immigrated back to Switzerland. At the same time, there were 2 non-Swiss men and 1 non-Swiss woman who immigrated from another country to Switzerland. The total Swiss population change in 2008 (from all sources, including moves across municipal borders) was an increase of 4 and the non-Swiss population increased by 6 people. This represents a population growth rate of 1.8%.

The age distribution, as of 2000, in Aedermannsdorf is; 51 children or 9.4% of the population are between 0 and 6 years old and 120 teenagers or 22.1% are between 7 and 19. Of the adult population, 22 people or 4.1% of the population are between 20 and 24 years old. 157 people or 28.9% are between 25 and 44, and 107 people or 19.7% are between 45 and 64. The senior population distribution is 70 people or 12.9% of the population are between 65 and 79 years old and there are 16 people or 2.9% who are over 80.

As of 2000, there were 238 people who were single and never married in the municipality. There were 274 married individuals, 23 widows or widowers and 8 individuals who are divorced.

As of 2000, there were 190 private households in the municipality, and an average of 2.8 persons per household. There were 40 households that consist of only one person and 35 households with five or more people. Out of a total of 193 households that answered this question, 20.7% were households made up of just one person and there were 2 adults who lived with their parents. Of the rest of the households, there are 63 married couples without children, 79 married couples with children There were 5 single parents with a child or children. There was 1 household that was made up of unrelated people and 3 households that were made up of some sort of institution or another collective housing.

In 2000 there were 95 single-family homes (or 60.1% of the total) out of a total of 158 inhabited buildings. There were 14 multi-family buildings (8.9%), along with 39 multi-purpose buildings that were mostly used for housing (24.7%) and 10 other use buildings (commercial or industrial) that also had some housing (6.3%). Of the single-family homes 14 were built before 1919, while 16 were built between 1990 and 2000. The greatest number of single-family homes (19) were built between 1981 and 1990.

In 2000 there were 199 apartments in the municipality. The most common apartment size was 4 rooms of which there were 52. There were single-room apartments and 100 apartments with five or more rooms. Of these apartments, a total of 180 apartments (90.5% of the total) were permanently occupied, while 9 apartments (4.5%) were seasonally occupied and 10 apartments (5.0%) were empty. As of 2009, the construction rate of new housing units was 3.6 new units per 1000 residents. The vacancy rate for the municipality, in 2010, was 3.15%.

The historical population is given in the following chart:

== Politics ==
In the 2007 federal election the most popular party was the CVP which received 54.19% of the vote. The next three most popular parties were the SVP (20.57%), the FDP (16.81%) and the SP (4.73%). In the federal election, a total of 238 votes were cast, and the voter turnout was 58.6%.

== Economy ==
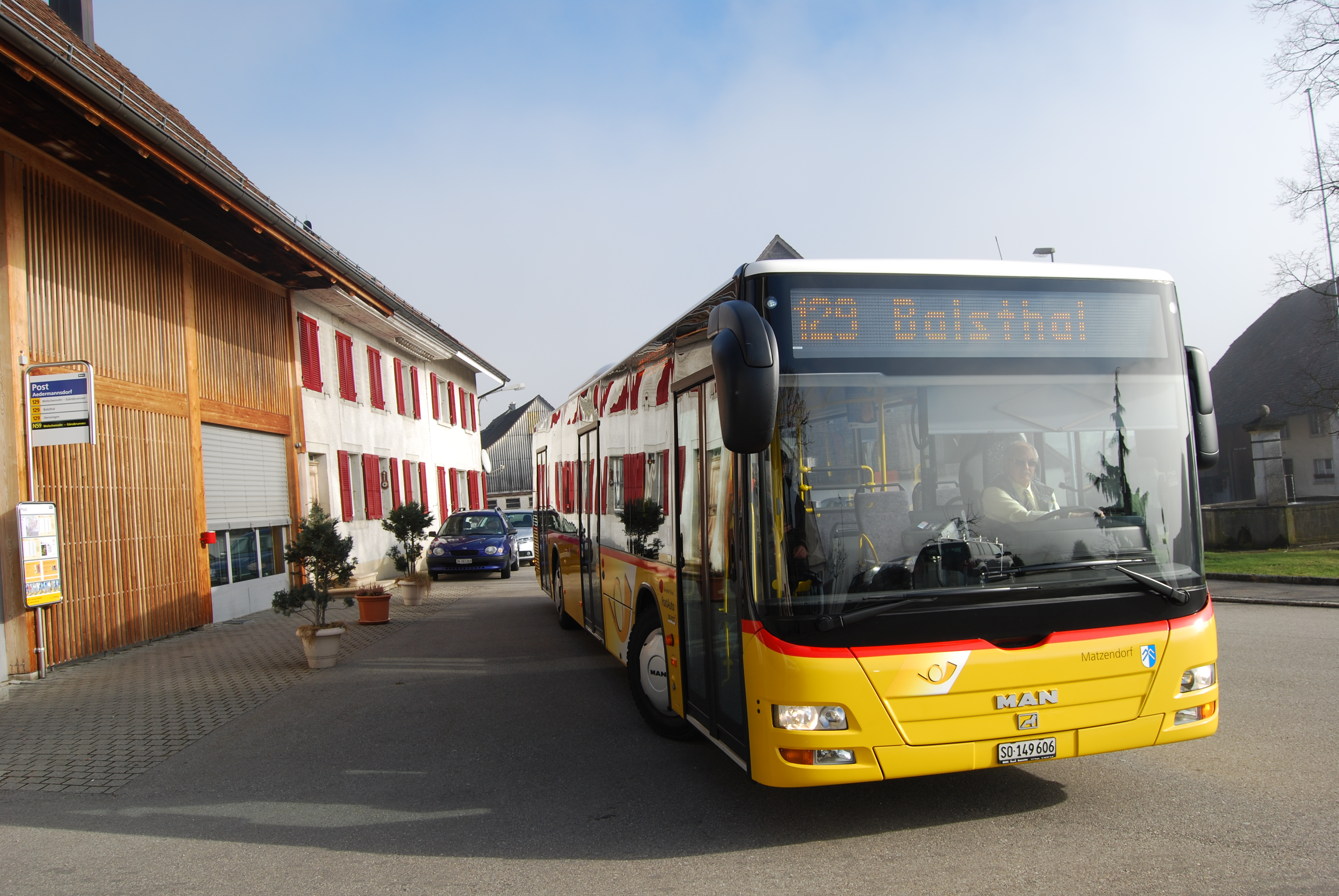
Bus station in Aedermannsdorf

As of 2010, Aedermannsdorf had an unemployment rate of 1.9%. As of 2008, there were 50 people employed in the primary economic sector and about 22 businesses involved in this sector. 42 people were employed in the secondary sector and there were 7 businesses in this sector. 57 people were employed in the tertiary sector, with 20 businesses in this sector. There were 263 residents of the municipality who were employed in some capacity, of which females made up 39.2% of the workforce.

In 2008 the total number of full-time equivalent jobs was 121. The number of jobs in the primary sector was 34, of which 30 were in agriculture and 4 were in forestry or lumber production. The number of jobs in the secondary sector was 42 of which 3 or (7.1%) were in manufacturing and 39 (92.9%) were in construction. The number of jobs in the tertiary sector was 45. In the tertiary sector; 22 or 48.9% were in wholesale or retail sales or the repair of motor vehicles, 10 or 22.2% were in the movement and storage of goods, 4 or 8.9% were in a hotel or restaurant, 3 or 6.7% were in the information industry, 1 was the insurance or financial industry, .

In 2000, there were 58 workers who commuted into the municipality and 178 workers who commuted away. The municipality is a net exporter of workers, with about 3.1 workers leaving the municipality for every one entering. Of the working population, 12.5% used public transportation to get to work, and 54.8% used a private car.

== Religion ==
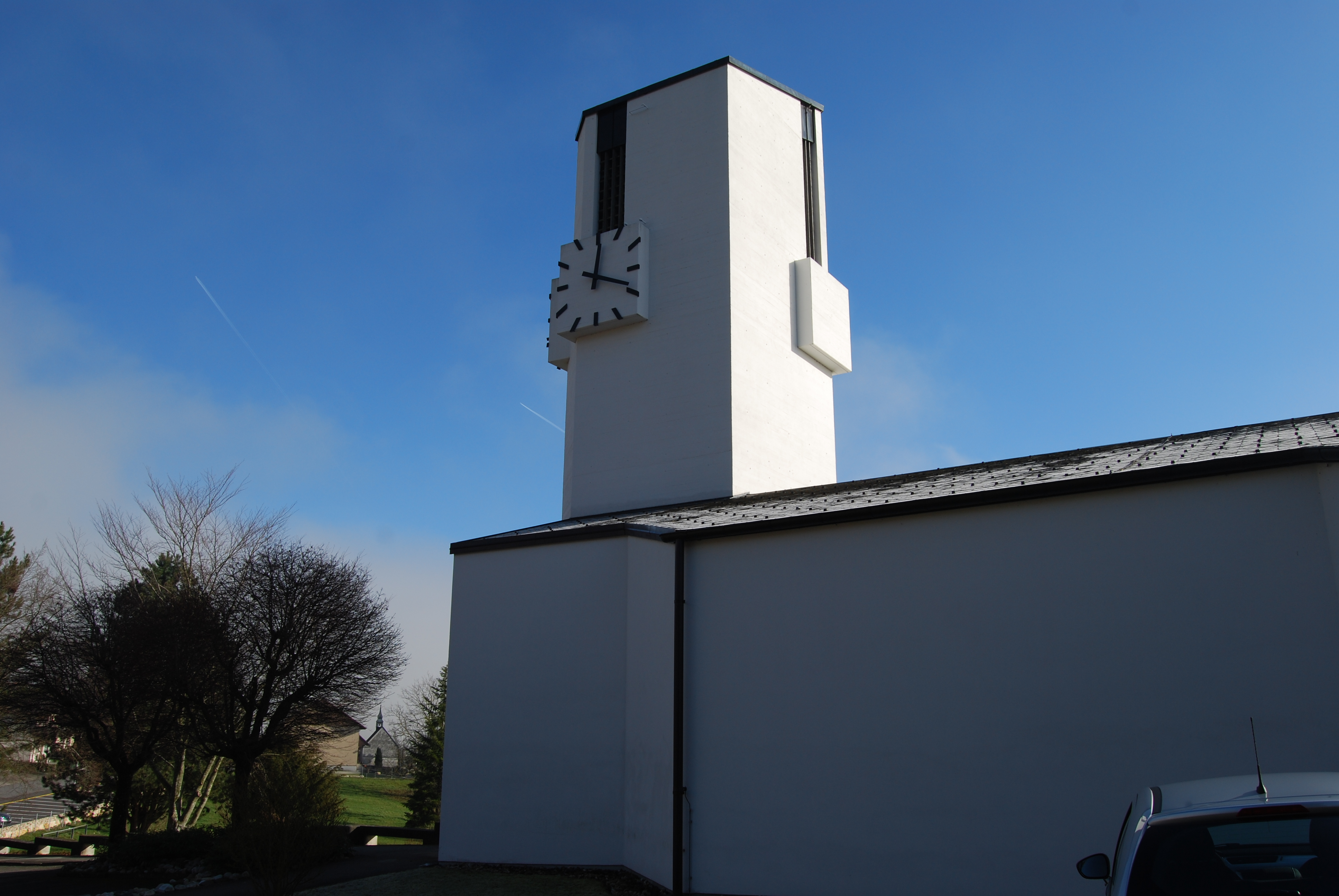
Church in Aedermannsdorf

From the 2000 census, 395 or 72.7% were Roman Catholic, while 100 or 18.4% belonged to the Swiss Reformed Church. Of the rest of the population, there were 4 members of an Orthodox church (or about 0.74% of the population), and there were 7 individuals (or about 1.29% of the population) who belonged to another Christian church. There were 8 (or about 1.47% of the population) who were Islamic. There were 2 individuals who were Buddhist. 19 (or about 3.50% of the population) belonged to no church, are agnostic or atheist, and 8 individuals (or about 1.47% of the population) did not answer the question.

== Education ==
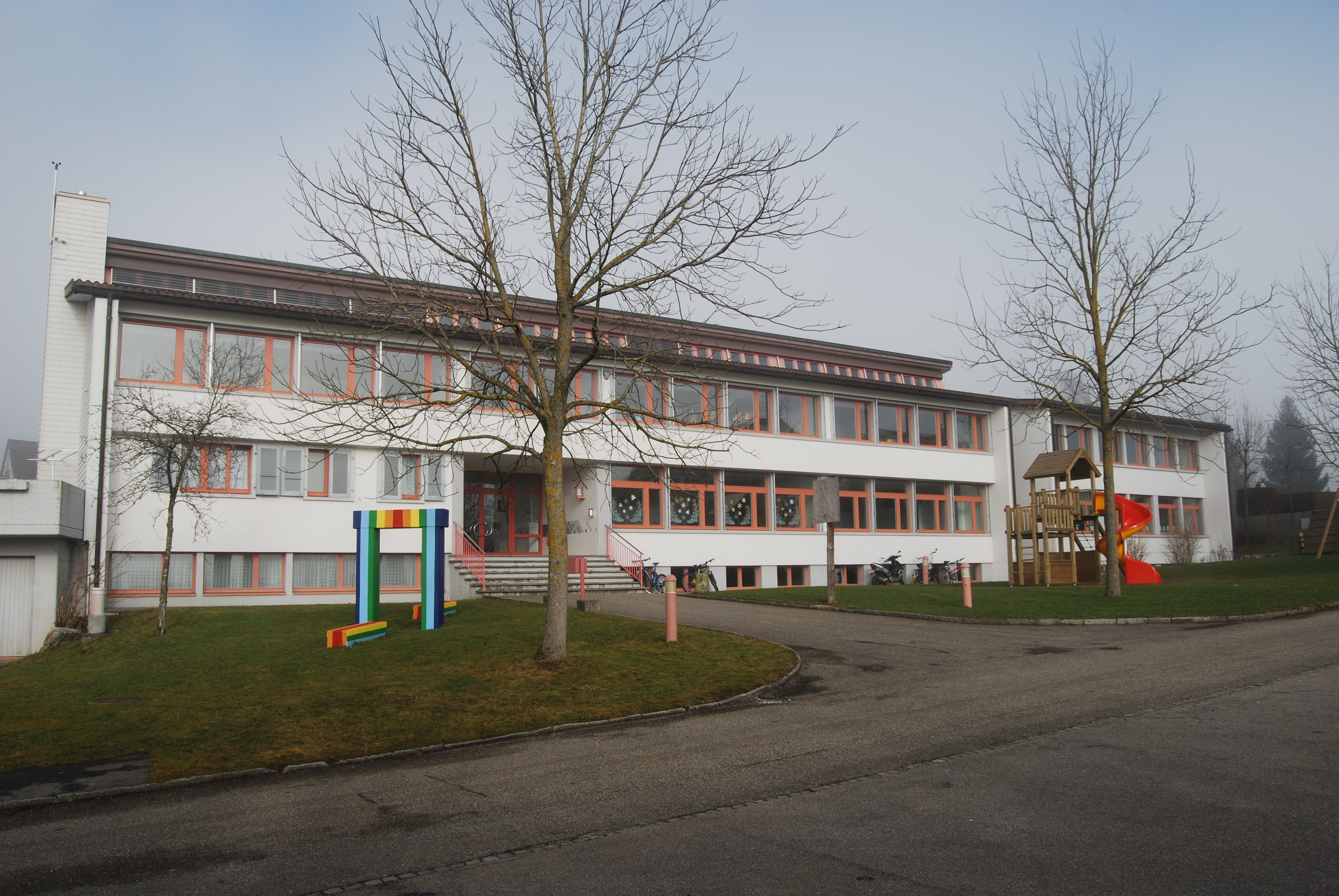
School in Aedermannsdorf

In Aedermannsdorf about 204 or (37.6%) of the population have completed non-mandatory upper secondary education, and 42 or (7.7%) have completed additional higher education (either university or a Fachhochschule). Of the 42 who completed tertiary schooling, 85.7% were Swiss men, 9.5% were Swiss women.

During the 2010–2011 school year there were a total of 56 students in the Aedermannsdorf school system. The education system in the Canton of Solothurn allows young children to attend two years of non-obligatory Kindergarten. During that school year, there were 25 children in kindergarten. The canton's school system requires students to attend six years of primary school, with some of the children attending smaller, specialized classes. In the municipality there were 31 students in primary school. The secondary school program consists of three lower, obligatory years of schooling, followed by three to five years of optional, advanced schools. All the lower secondary students from Aedermannsdorf attend their school in a neighboring municipality.

As of 2000, there was one student in Aedermannsdorf who came from another municipality, while 93 residents attended schools outside the municipality.
