= Thal District =

Coordinates: 47°19′00″N 7°41′40″E

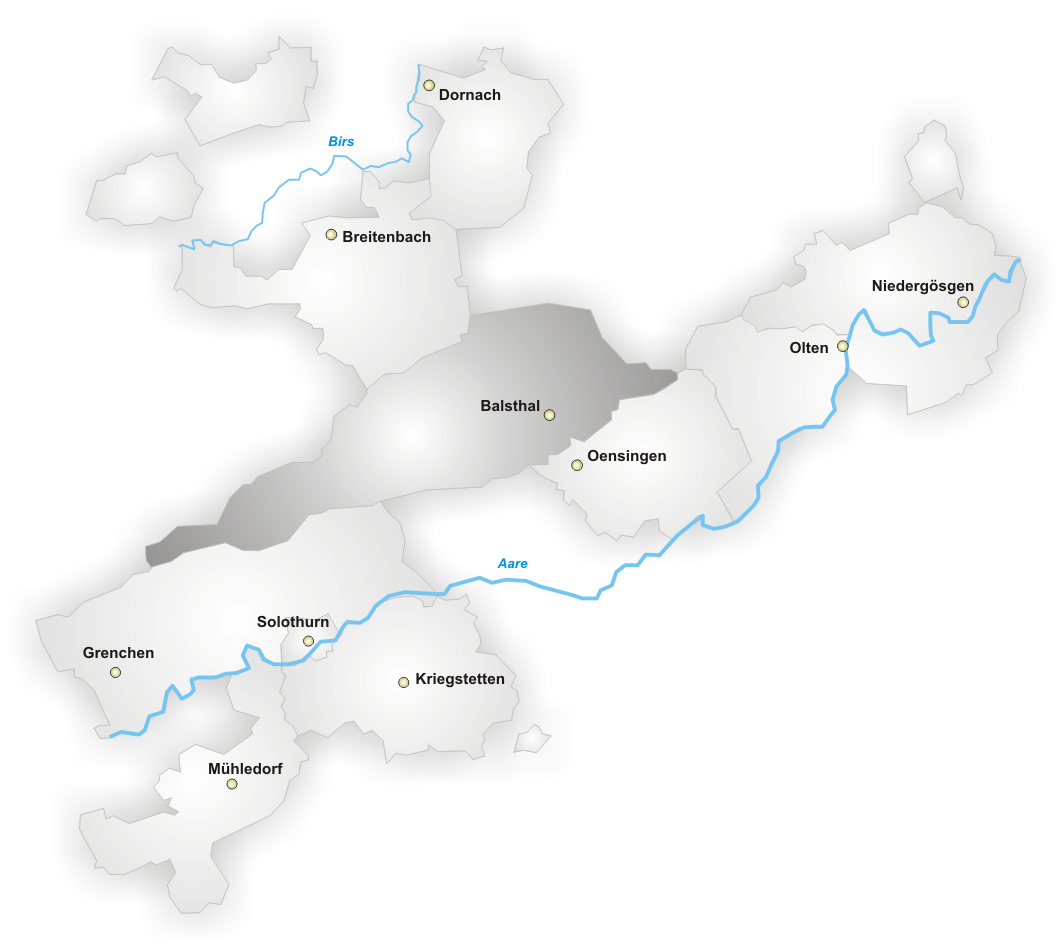
Thal District, canton of Solothurn

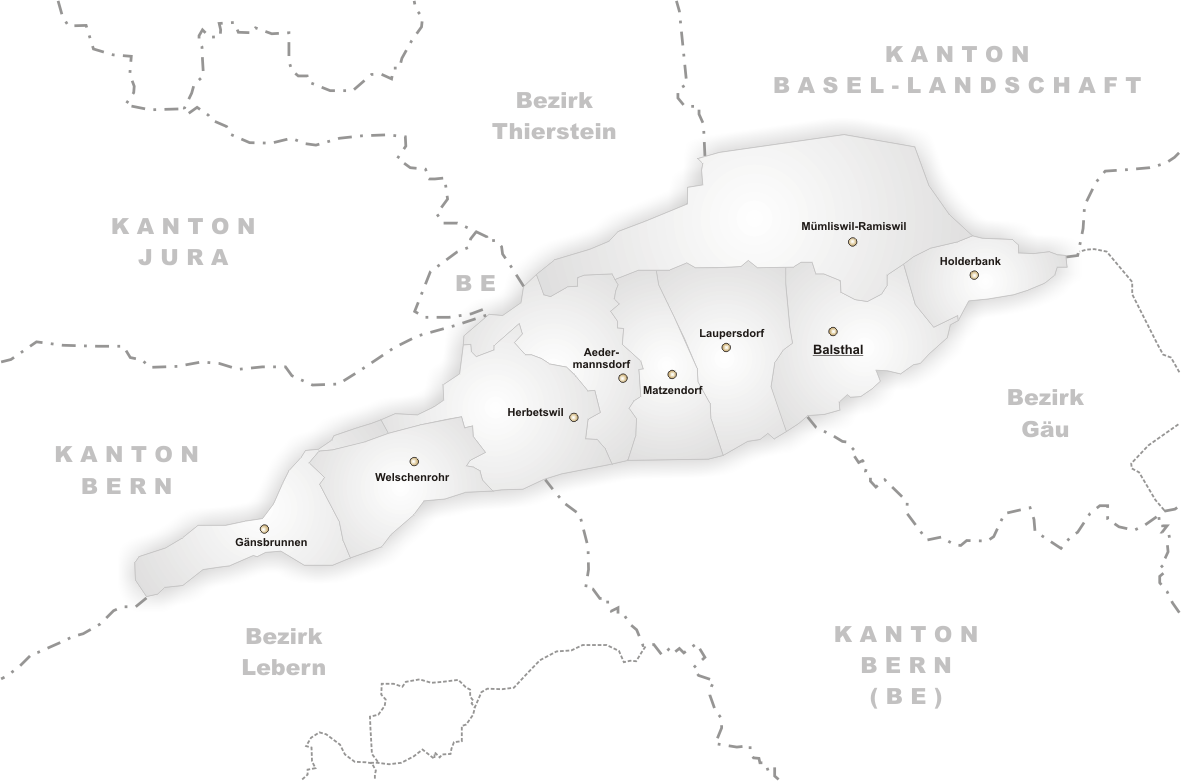
Municipalities of Thal District

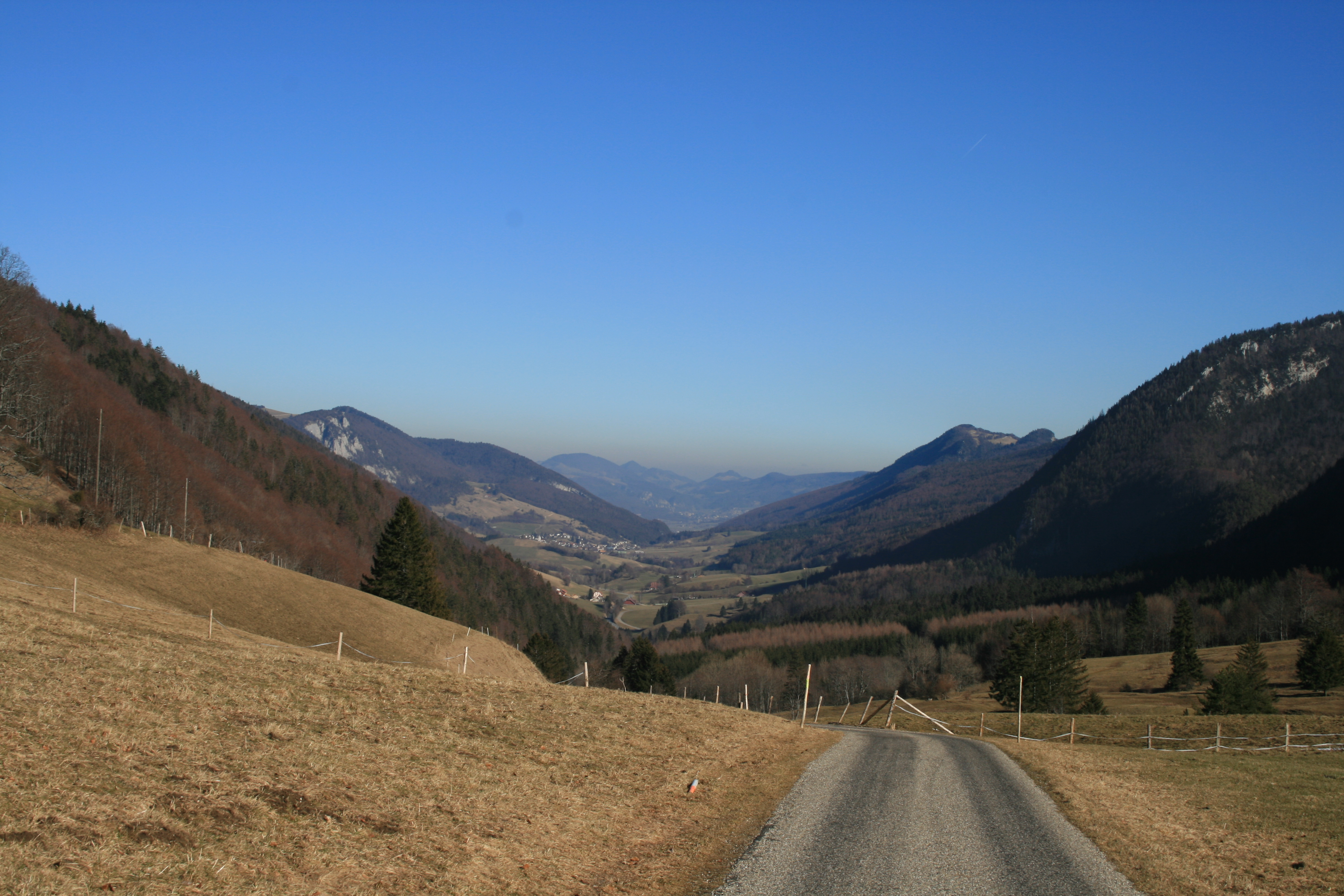
Thal

Thal District is one of the ten districts of the canton of Solothurn in Switzerland, situated in the centre of the canton. Together with the Gäu District, it forms the Amtei (electoral district) of Thal-Gäu. It has a population of 14,752 (as of 31 December 2020).

== Municipalities ==
Thal District contains the following municipalities:

| Coat of arms | Municipality | Population (31 December 2020) | Area, km^{2} |
|---|---|---|---|
| Aedermannsdorf | Aedermannsdorf | 581 | 12.88 |
| Balsthal | Balsthal | 6,210 | 15.69 |
| Herbetswil | Herbetswil | 568 | 16.35 |
| Holderbank | Holderbank | 705 | 7.79 |
| Laupersdorf | Laupersdorf | 1,810 | 15.52 |
| Matzendorf | Matzendorf | 1,321 | 11.29 |
| Mümliswil-Ramiswil | Mümliswil-Ramiswil | 2,386 | 35.48 |
| Welschenrohr-Gänsbrunnen | Welschenrohr-Gänsbrunnen | 1,158 | 24.46 |
| | Total | 14,752 | 139.33 |

== Geography ==
Thal has an area, as of 2009, of 139.34 square kilometers (53.80 sq mi). Of this area, 57.91 km^{2} (22.36 sq mi) or 41.6% is used for agricultural purposes, while 72.74 km^{2} (28.09 sq mi) or 52.2% is forested. Of the rest of the land, 8.03 km^{2} (3.10 sq mi) or 5.8% is settled (buildings or roads), 0.26 km^{2} (0.10 sq mi) or 0.2% is either rivers or lakes and 0.4 km^{2} (0.15 sq mi) or 0.3% is unproductive land.

Of the built up area, housing and buildings made up 2.9% and transportation infrastructure made up 1.9%. Out of the forested land, 49.6% of the total land area is heavily forested and 2.6% is covered with orchards or small clusters of trees. Of the agricultural land, 27.6% is used for growing crops and 13.3% is used for alpine pastures. All the water in the district is flowing water.

== Mergers ==
On 1 January 2021 the former municipalities of Gänsbrunnen and Welschenrohr merged to form the new municipality of Welschenrohr-Gänsbrunnen.

== Coat of arms ==
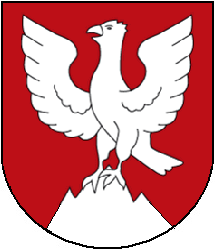
Coat of Arms

The blazon of the municipal coat of arms is Gules a Falcon Argent displayed statant on a rock issuant of the same.

== Demographics ==
Thal has a population (as of December 2020) of 14,752.

Most of the population (as of 2000) speaks German (12,734 or 90.7%), with Serbo-Croatian being second most common (283 or 2.0%) and Albanian being third (266 or 1.9%). There are 78 people who speak French and 8 people who speak Romansh.

As of 2008, the gender distribution of the population was 51.2% male and 48.8% female. The population was made up of 5,958 Swiss men (41.6% of the population) and 1,367 (9.5%) non-Swiss men. There were 5,863 Swiss women (40.9%) and 1,131 (7.9%) non-Swiss women. Of the population in the district 6,483 or about 46.2% were born in Thal and lived there in 2000. There were 2,888 or 20.6% who were born in the same canton, while 2,402 or 17.1% were born somewhere else in Switzerland, and 1,869 or 13.3% were born outside of Switzerland.

In 2008 there were 92 live births to Swiss citizens and 35 births to non-Swiss citizens, and in same time span there were 109 deaths of Swiss citizens and 10 non-Swiss citizen deaths. Ignoring immigration and emigration, the population of Swiss citizens decreased by 17 while the foreign population increased by 25. There were 26 Swiss men and 13 Swiss women who immigrated back to Switzerland. At the same time, there were 81 non-Swiss men and 46 non-Swiss women who immigrated from another country to Switzerland. The total Swiss population change in 2008 (from all sources, including moves across municipal borders) was a decrease of 104 and the non-Swiss population increased by 121 people. This represents a population growth rate of 0.1%.

As of 2000, there were 5,757 people who were single and never married in the district. There were 6,828 married individuals, 903 widows or widowers and 550 individuals who are divorced.

There were 1,530 households that consist of only one person and 556 households with five or more people. Out of a total of 5,540 households that answered this question, 27.6% were households made up of just one person and 64 were adults who lived with their parents. Of the rest of the households, there are 1,571 married couples without children, 1,968 married couples with children There were 249 single parents with a child or children. There were 66 households that were made up unrelated people and 92 households that were made some sort of institution or another collective housing.

The historical population is given in the following chart:

== Politics ==
In the 2007 federal election the most popular party was the CVP which received 34.6% of the vote. The next three most popular parties were the SVP (30.2%), the FDP (19.55%) and the SP (9.45%). In the federal election, a total of 5,474 votes were cast, and the voter turnout was 56.4%.

== Religion ==
From the 2000 census, 8,990 or 64.0% were Roman Catholic, while 2,525 or 18.0% belonged to the Swiss Reformed Church. Of the rest of the population, there were 233 members of an Orthodox church (or about 1.66% of the population), there were 16 individuals (or about 0.11% of the population) who belonged to the Christian Catholic Church, and there were 188 individuals (or about 1.34% of the population) who belonged to another Christian church. There were 816 (or about 5.81% of the population) who were Islamic. There were 42 individuals who were Buddhist, 13 individuals who were Hindu and 9 individuals who belonged to another church. 889 (or about 6.33% of the population) belonged to no church, are agnostic or atheist, and 317 individuals (or about 2.26% of the population) did not answer the question.

== Education ==
In Thal about 5,109 or (36.4%) of the population have completed non-mandatory upper secondary education, and 1,019 or (7.3%) have completed additional higher education (either University or a Fachhochschule). Of the 1,019 who completed tertiary schooling, 73.9% were Swiss men, 16.0% were Swiss women, 5.9% were non-Swiss men and 4.2% were non-Swiss women.

During the 2010–2011 school year there were a total of 532 students in the Thal school system. The education system in the Canton of Solothurn allows young children to attend two years of non-obligatory Kindergarten. During that school year, there were no children in the district kindergarten. The canton's school system requires students to attend six years of primary school, with some of the children attending smaller, specialized classes. In the district there were no students in primary school and 26 students in the special, smaller classes. The secondary school program consists of three lower, obligatory years of schooling, followed by three to five years of optional, advanced schools. 506 lower secondary students attend school in the Thal district schools.
