= Matzendorf =

- Municipality
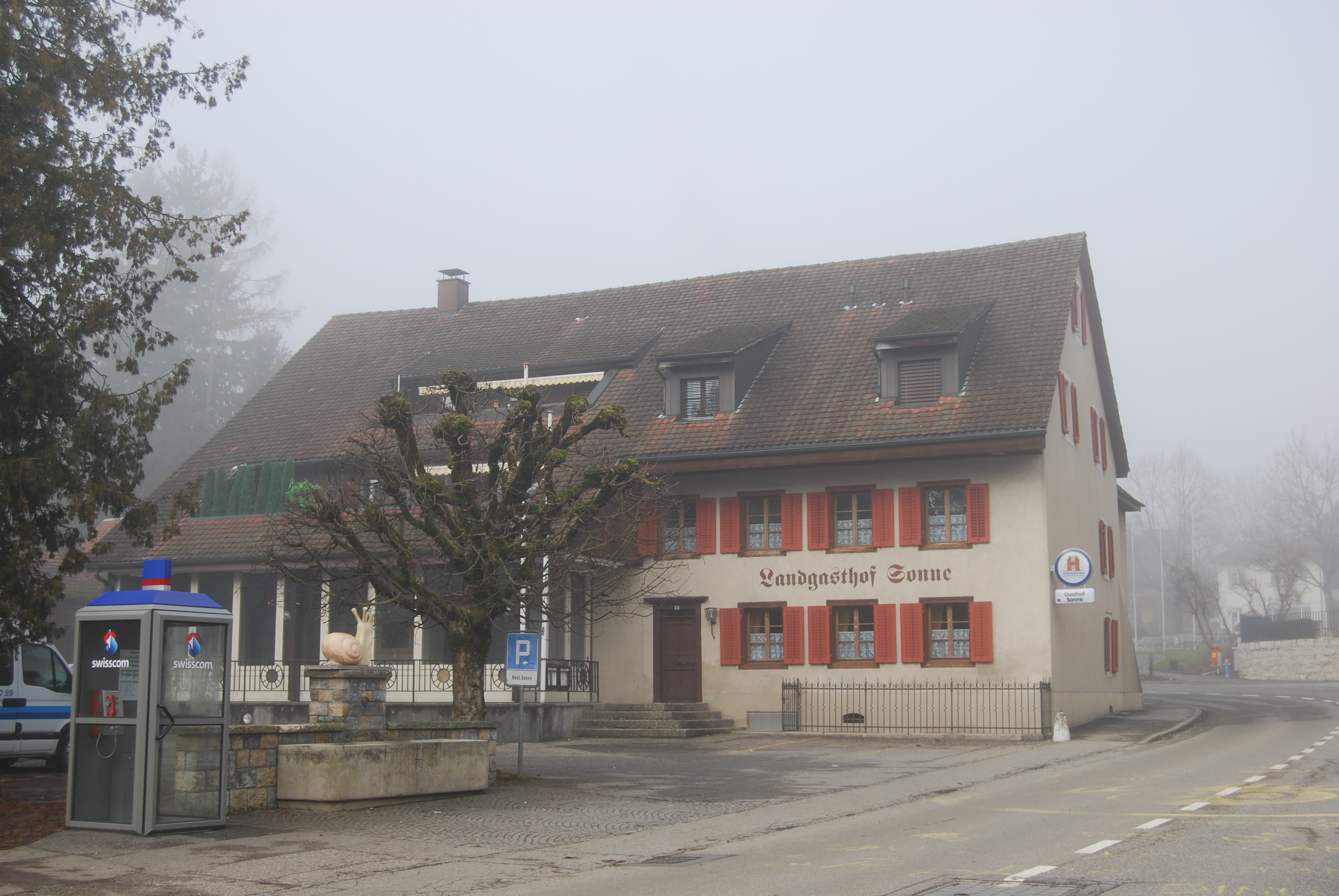
- Landgasthof Sonne in Matzendorf village

- Coat of arms
- Location of Matzendorf
- Location within Switzerland Location within Canton of Solothurn
- Coordinates: 47°18′24″N 7°37′45″E
- Country: Switzerland
- Canton: Solothurn
- District: Thal

Area
  - Total: 11.25 km^{2} (4.34 sq mi)
- Elevation: 510 m (1,670 ft)

Population (December 2020)
  - Total: 1,321
  - Density: 117.4/km^{2} (304.1/sq mi)
- Time zone: UTC+01:00 (CET)
  - Summer (DST): UTC+02:00 (CEST)
- Postal code: 4713
- SFOS number: 2427
- ISO 3166 code: CH-SO
- Surrounded by: Aedermannsdorf, Laupersdorf, Mümliswil-Ramiswil, Rumisberg (BE), Wolfisberg (BE)
- Website: matzendorf.ch

Matzendorf is a municipality in the district of Thal in the canton of Solothurn in Switzerland.

== History ==
Matzendorf is first mentioned in 968 as Mazendorf though this comes from an 11th Century copy of the earlier document. In 1227 it was mentioned as apud Macindorf.

== Geography ==
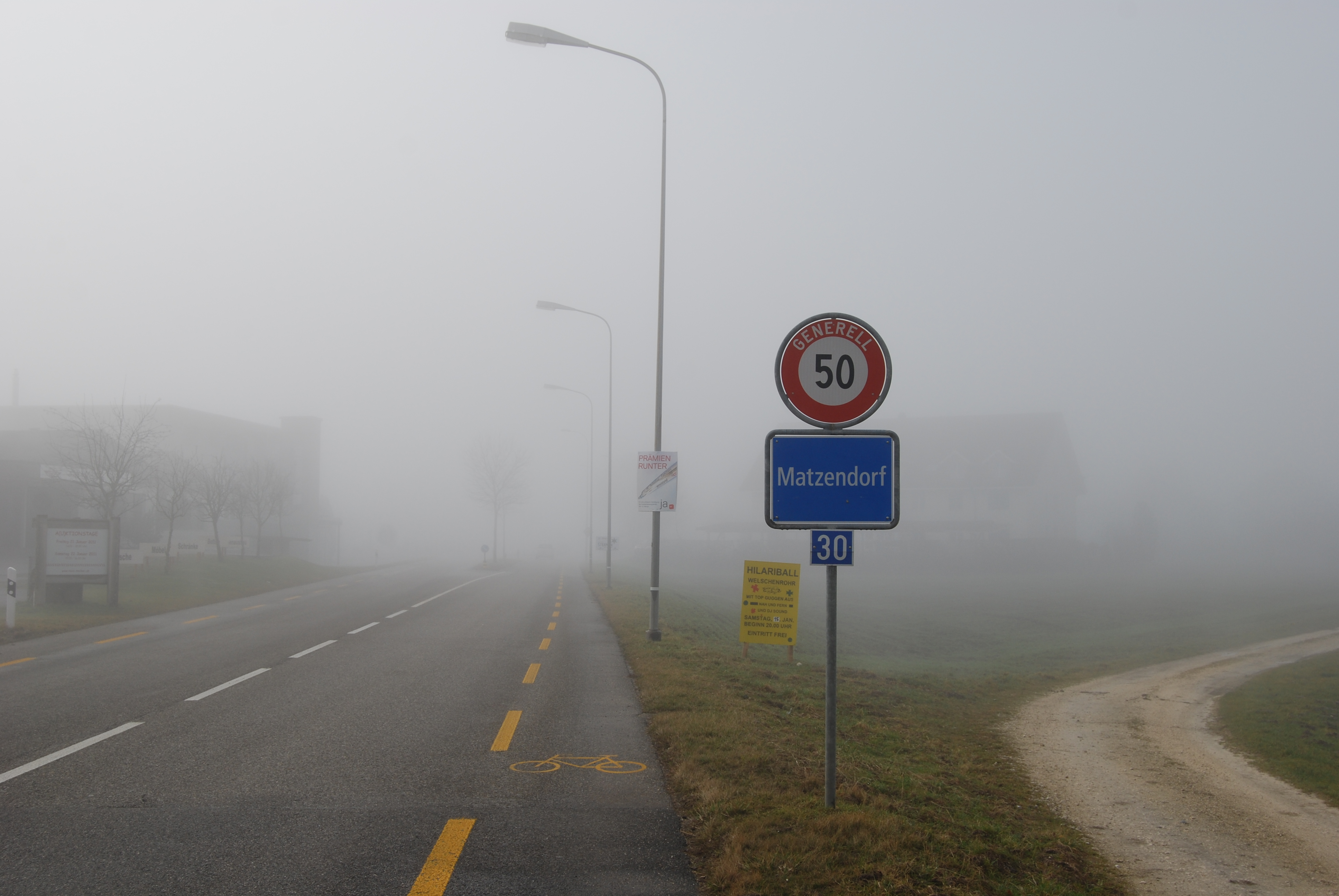
Entrance to the village

Aerial view (1955)

Matzendorf has an area, as of 2009, of 11.25 square kilometers (4.34 sq mi). Of this area, 4.58 km^{2} (1.77 sq mi) or 40.7% is used for agricultural purposes, while 5.81 km^{2} (2.24 sq mi) or 51.6% is forested. Of the rest of the land, 0.88 km^{2} (0.34 sq mi) or 7.8% is settled (buildings or roads), 0.02 km^{2} (4.9 acres) or 0.2% is either rivers or lakes.

Of the built up area, housing and buildings made up 4.4% and transportation infrastructure made up 2.6%. Out of the forested land, 50.0% of the total land area is heavily forested and 1.6% is covered with orchards or small clusters of trees. Of the agricultural land, 18.0% is used for growing crops and 17.2% is pastures, while 1.3% is used for orchards or vine crops and 4.1% is used for alpine pastures. All the water in the municipality is flowing water.

The municipality is located in the Thal district, in the Dünnern valley. It consists of the haufendorf village (an irregular, unplanned and quite closely packed village, built around a central square) of Matzendorf and the hamlet of Mühli.

== Coat of arms ==
The blazon of the municipal coat of arms is Per pale Argent two Angle Plates in Saltire counterchanged.

== Demographics ==
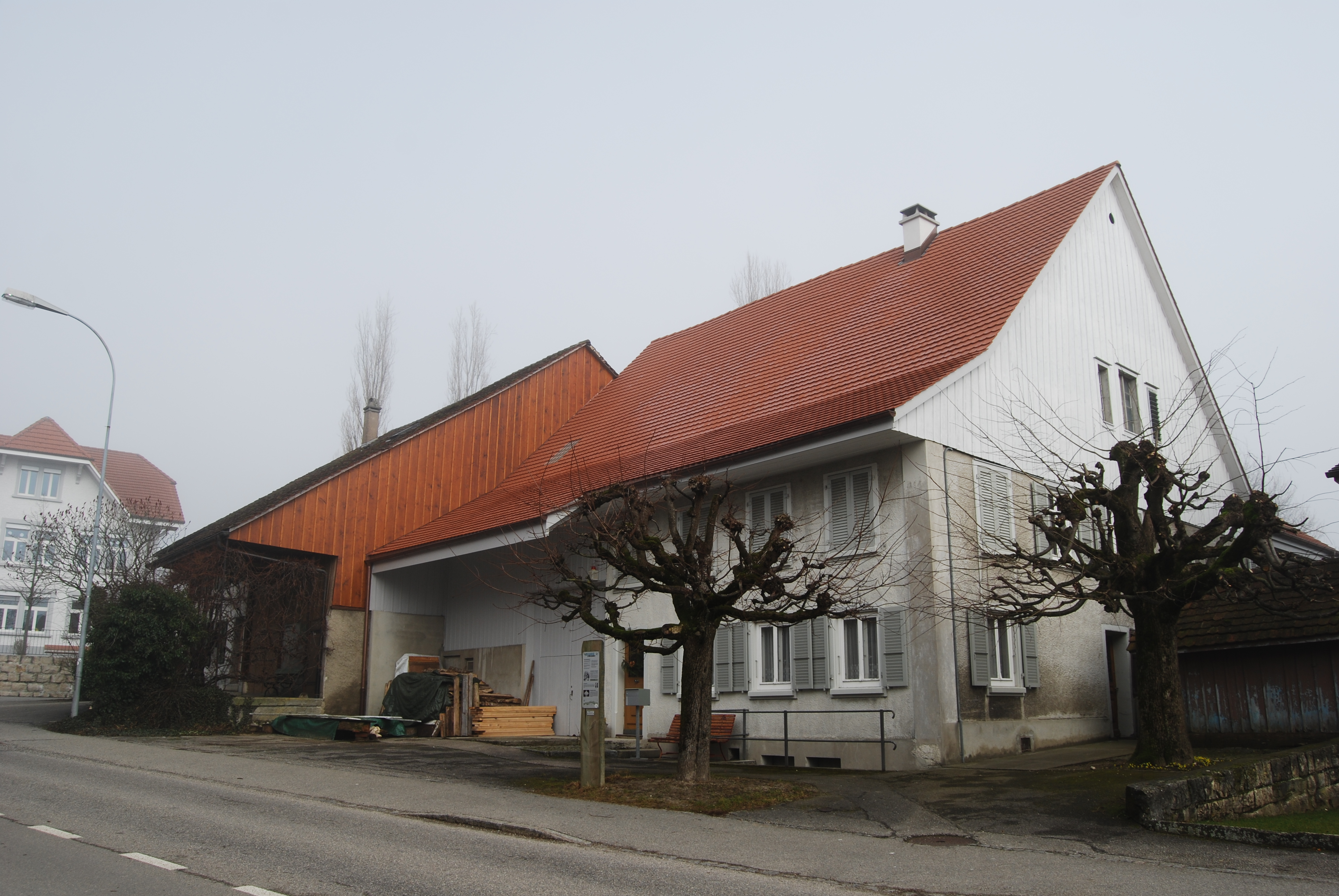
House in Matzendorf

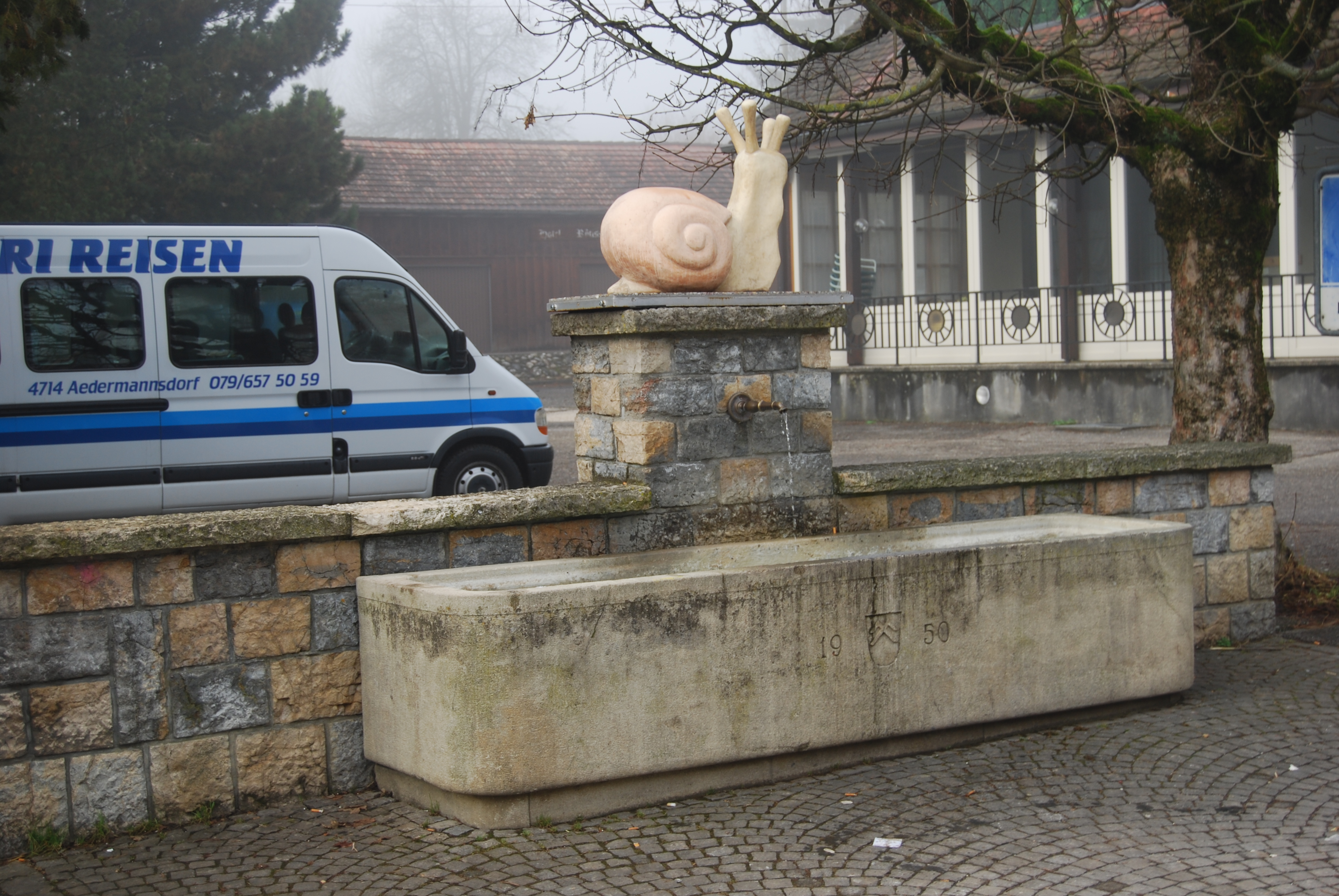
Village fountain

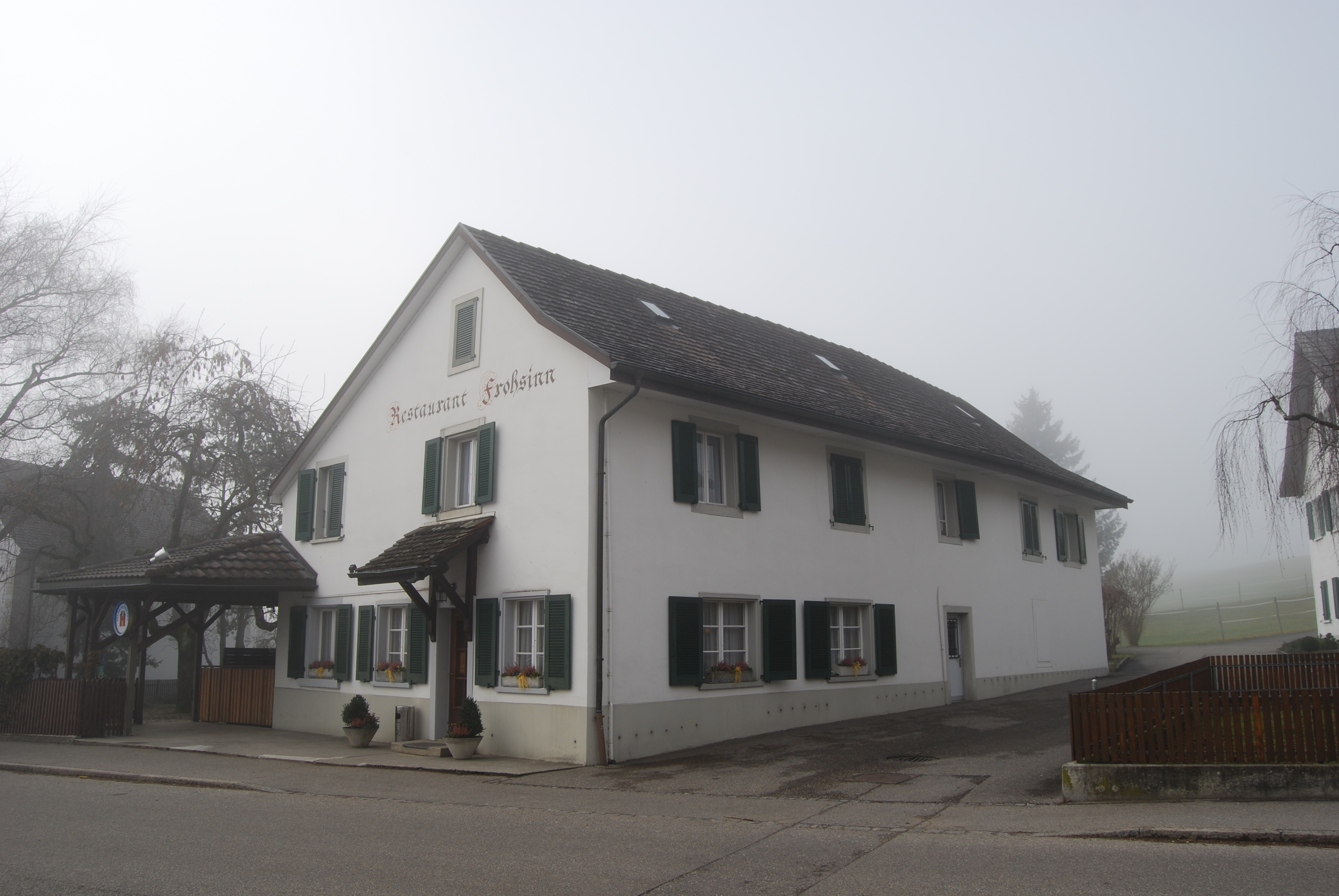
Frohsinn restaurant

Matzendorf has a population (as of December 2020) of 1,321. As of 2008, 4.8% of the population are resident foreign nationals. Over the last 10 years (1999–2009 ) the population has changed at a rate of 0.2%.

Most of the population (as of 2000) speaks German (1,255 or 96.2%), with Albanian being second most common (13 or 1.0%) and Serbo-Croatian being third (12 or 0.9%). There are 3 people who speak French.

As of 2008, the gender distribution of the population was 50.9% male and 49.1% female. The population was made up of 619 Swiss men (47.3% of the population) and 47 (3.6%) non-Swiss men. There were 613 Swiss women (46.8%) and 30 (2.3%) non-Swiss women. Of the population in the municipality 615 or about 47.1% were born in Matzendorf and lived there in 2000. There were 369 or 28.3% who were born in the same canton, while 234 or 17.9% were born somewhere else in Switzerland, and 74 or 5.7% were born outside of Switzerland.

In 2008 there were 7 live births to Swiss citizens and were 12 deaths of Swiss citizens. Ignoring immigration and emigration, the population of Swiss citizens decreased by 5 while the foreign population remained the same. There were 3 Swiss men who immigrated back to Switzerland. At the same time, there was 1 non-Swiss man and 1 non-Swiss woman who immigrated from another country to Switzerland. The total Swiss population change in 2008 (from all sources, including moves across municipal borders) was an increase of 6 and the non-Swiss population decreased by 5 people. This represents a population growth rate of 0.1%.

The age distribution, as of 2000, in Matzendorf is; 104 children or 8.0% of the population are between 0 and 6 years old and 292 teenagers or 22.4% are between 7 and 19. Of the adult population, 55 people or 4.2% of the population are between 20 and 24 years old. 401 people or 30.7% are between 25 and 44, and 275 people or 21.1% are between 45 and 64. The senior population distribution is 133 people or 10.2% of the population are between 65 and 79 years old and there are 45 people or 3.4% who are over 80.

As of 2000, there were 567 people who were single and never married in the municipality. There were 616 married individuals, 83 widows or widowers and 39 individuals who are divorced.

As of 2000, there were 462 private households in the municipality, and an average of 2.8 persons per household. There were 103 households that consist of only one person and 70 households with five or more people. Out of a total of 470 households that answered this question, 21.9% were households made up of just one person and there were 7 adults who lived with their parents. Of the rest of the households, there are 134 married couples without children, 193 married couples with children There were 22 single parents with a child or children. There were 3 households that were made up of unrelated people and 8 households that were made up of some sort of institution or another collective housing.

In 2000 there were 268 single family homes (or 70.5% of the total) out of a total of 380 inhabited buildings. There were 41 multi-family buildings (10.8%), along with 54 multi-purpose buildings that were mostly used for housing (14.2%) and 17 other use buildings (commercial or industrial) that also had some housing (4.5%). Of the single family homes 26 were built before 1919, while 33 were built between 1990 and 2000. The greatest number of single family homes (62) were built between 1981 and 1990.

In 2000 there were 503 apartments in the municipality. The most common apartment size was 5 rooms of which there were 161. There were 6 single room apartments and 252 apartments with five or more rooms. Of these apartments, a total of 455 apartments (90.5% of the total) were permanently occupied, while 24 apartments (4.8%) were seasonally occupied and 24 apartments (4.8%) were empty. As of 2009, the construction rate of new housing units was 0.8 new units per 1000 residents. The vacancy rate for the municipality, in 2010, was 1.85%.

The historical population is given in the following chart:

== Politics ==
In the 2007 federal election the most popular party was the CVP which received 31.89% of the vote. The next three most popular parties were the SVP (27.03%), the FDP (24.47%) and the SP (10.46%). In the federal election, a total of 607 votes were cast, and the voter turnout was 62.8%.

== Economy ==
As of 2010, Matzendorf had an unemployment rate of 2.1%. As of 2008, there were 68 people employed in the primary economic sector and about 32 businesses involved in this sector. 100 people were employed in the secondary sector and there were 21 businesses in this sector. 145 people were employed in the tertiary sector, with 34 businesses in this sector. There were 633 residents of the municipality who were employed in some capacity, of which females made up 38.2% of the workforce.

In 2008 the total number of full-time equivalent jobs was 256. The number of jobs in the primary sector was 44, all of which were in agriculture. The number of jobs in the secondary sector was 91 of which 49 or (53.8%) were in manufacturing and 41 (45.1%) were in construction. The number of jobs in the tertiary sector was 121. In the tertiary sector; 21 or 17.4% were in wholesale or retail sales or the repair of motor vehicles, 15 or 12.4% were in the movement and storage of goods, 10 or 8.3% were in a hotel or restaurant, 6 or 5.0% were in the information industry, 1 was a technical professional or scientist, 9 or 7.4% were in education and 49 or 40.5% were in health care.

In 2000, there were 121 workers who commuted into the municipality and 441 workers who commuted away. The municipality is a net exporter of workers, with about 3.6 workers leaving the municipality for every one entering. Of the working population, 13.3% used public transportation to get to work, and 58% used a private car.

== Religion ==
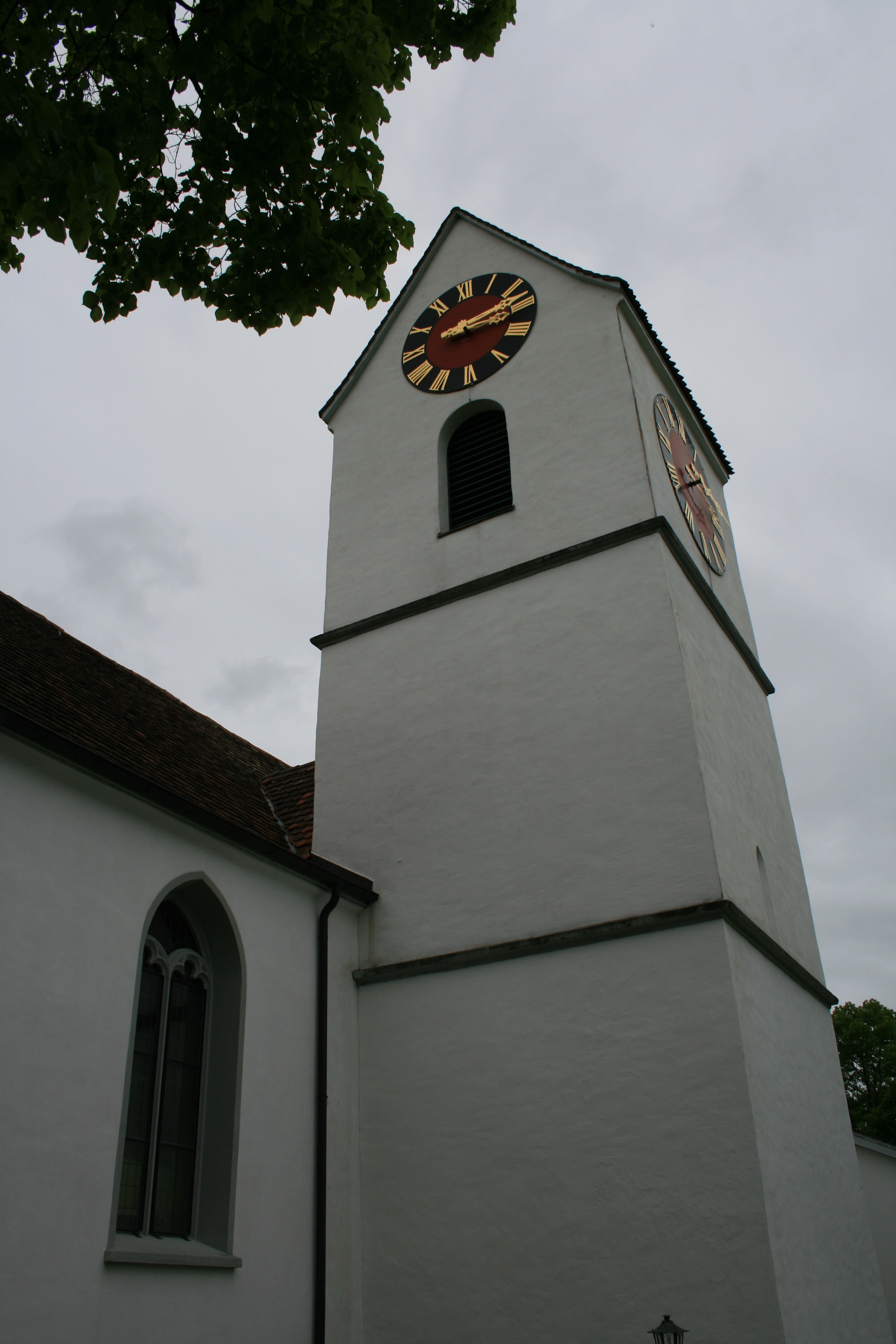
Sankt Pankratius Church

From the 2000 census, 955 or 73.2% were Roman Catholic, while 224 or 17.2% belonged to the Swiss Reformed Church. Of the rest of the population, there were 3 members of an Orthodox church (or about 0.23% of the population), there was 1 individual who belongs to the Christian Catholic Church, and there were 16 individuals (or about 1.23% of the population) who belonged to another Christian church. There were 24 (or about 1.84% of the population) who were Islamic. 76 (or about 5.82% of the population) belonged to no church, are agnostic or atheist, and 5 individuals (or about 0.38% of the population) did not answer the question.

== Education ==
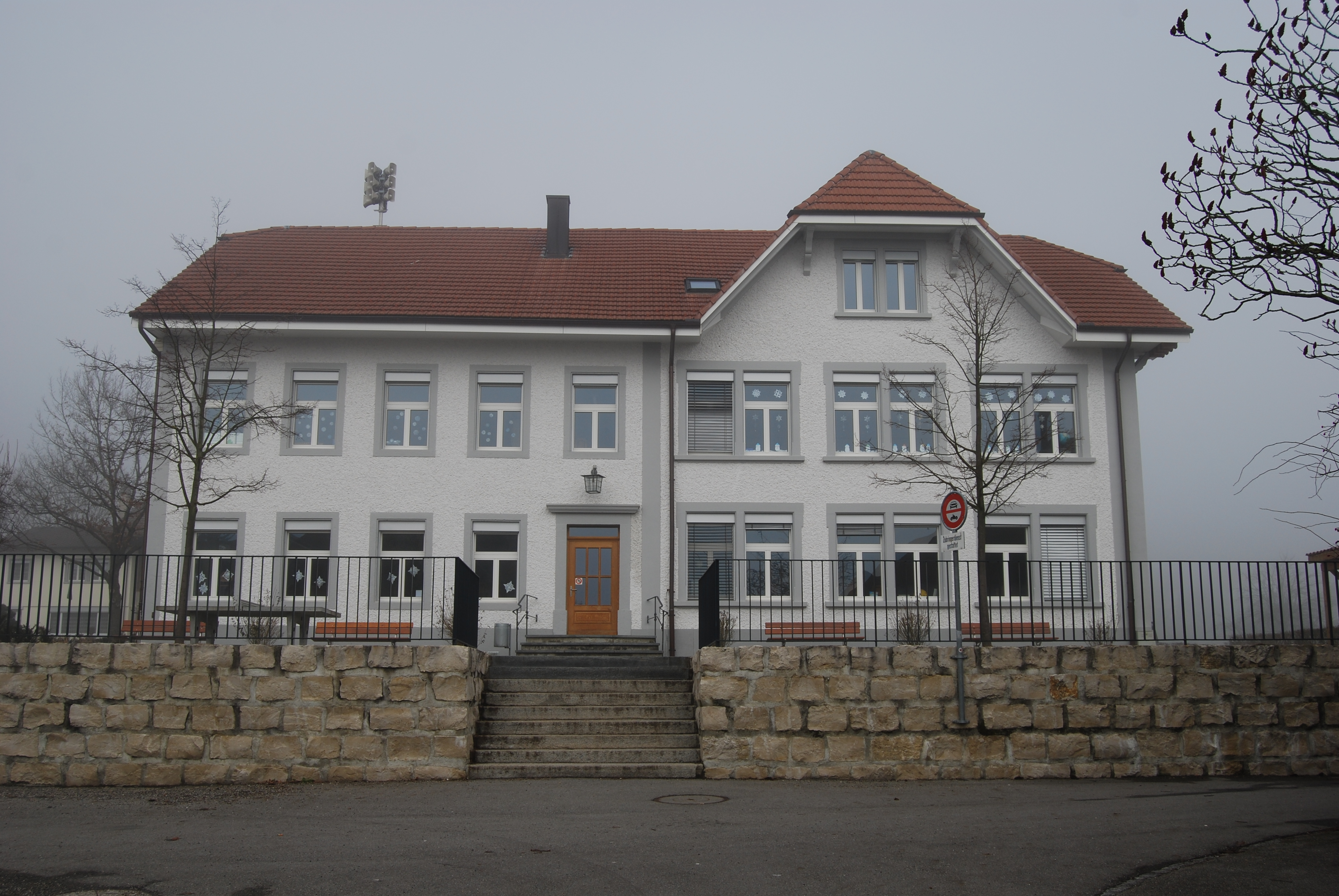
Matzendorf school house

In Matzendorf about 479 or (36.7%) of the population have completed non-mandatory upper secondary education, and 96 or (7.4%) have completed additional higher education (either university or a Fachhochschule). Of the 96 who completed tertiary schooling, 74.0% were Swiss men, 19.8% were Swiss women.

During the 2010–2011 school year there were a total of 108 students in the Matzendorf school system. The education system in the Canton of Solothurn allows young children to attend two years of non-obligatory Kindergarten. During that school year, there were 24 children in kindergarten. The canton's school system requires students to attend six years of primary school, with some of the children attending smaller, specialized classes. In the municipality there were 84 students in primary school. The secondary school program consists of three lower, obligatory years of schooling, followed by three to five years of optional, advanced schools. All the lower secondary students from Matzendorf attend their school in a neighboring municipality.

As of 2000, there were 113 students in Matzendorf who came from another municipality, while 80 residents attended schools outside the municipality.
