= Laupersdorf =

- Municipality
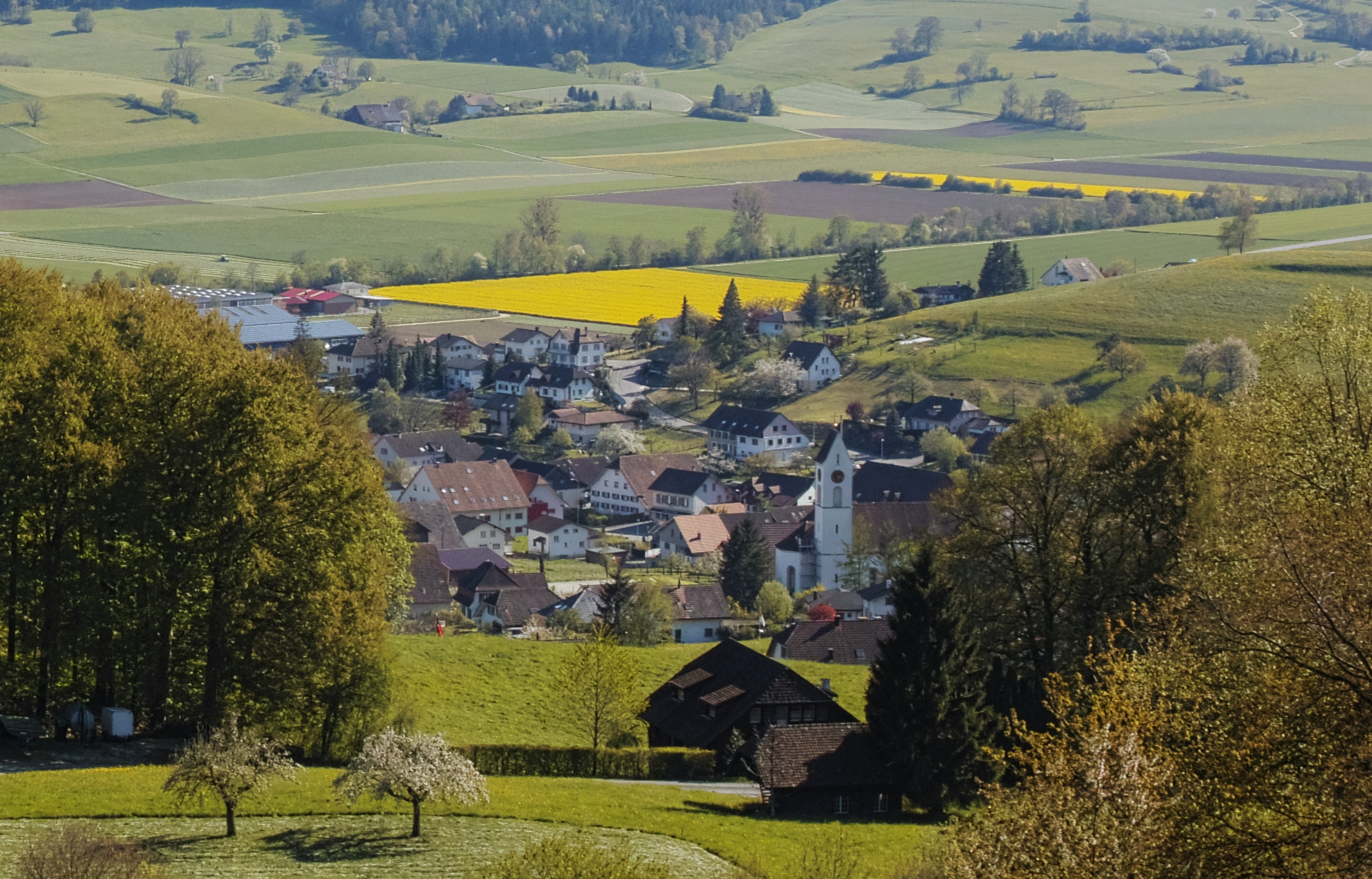
- View of Laupersdorf from the hiking trail to Höngen (2016)

- Coat of arms
- Location of Laupersdorf
- Location within Switzerland Location within Canton of Solothurn
- Coordinates: 47°19′N 7°39′E
- Country: Switzerland
- Canton: Solothurn
- District: Thal

Area
  - Total: 15.51 km^{2} (5.99 sq mi)
- Elevation: 493 m (1,617 ft)

Population (December 2020)
  - Total: 1,810
  - Density: 117/km^{2} (302/sq mi)
- Time zone: UTC+01:00 (CET)
  - Summer (DST): UTC+02:00 (CEST)
- Postal code: 4712
- SFOS number: 2426
- ISO 3166 code: CH-SO
- Surrounded by: Balsthal, Matzendorf, Mümliswil-Ramiswil, Niederbipp (BE), Wolfisberg (BE)
- Website: laupersdorf.ch

Laupersdorf is a municipality in the district of Thal in the canton of Solothurn in Switzerland.

== History ==
Laupersdorf is first mentioned in 968 as Luiperestorf which comes from an 11th Century copy of the earlier document. In 1179 it was mentioned as de Loppestorf.

== Geography ==
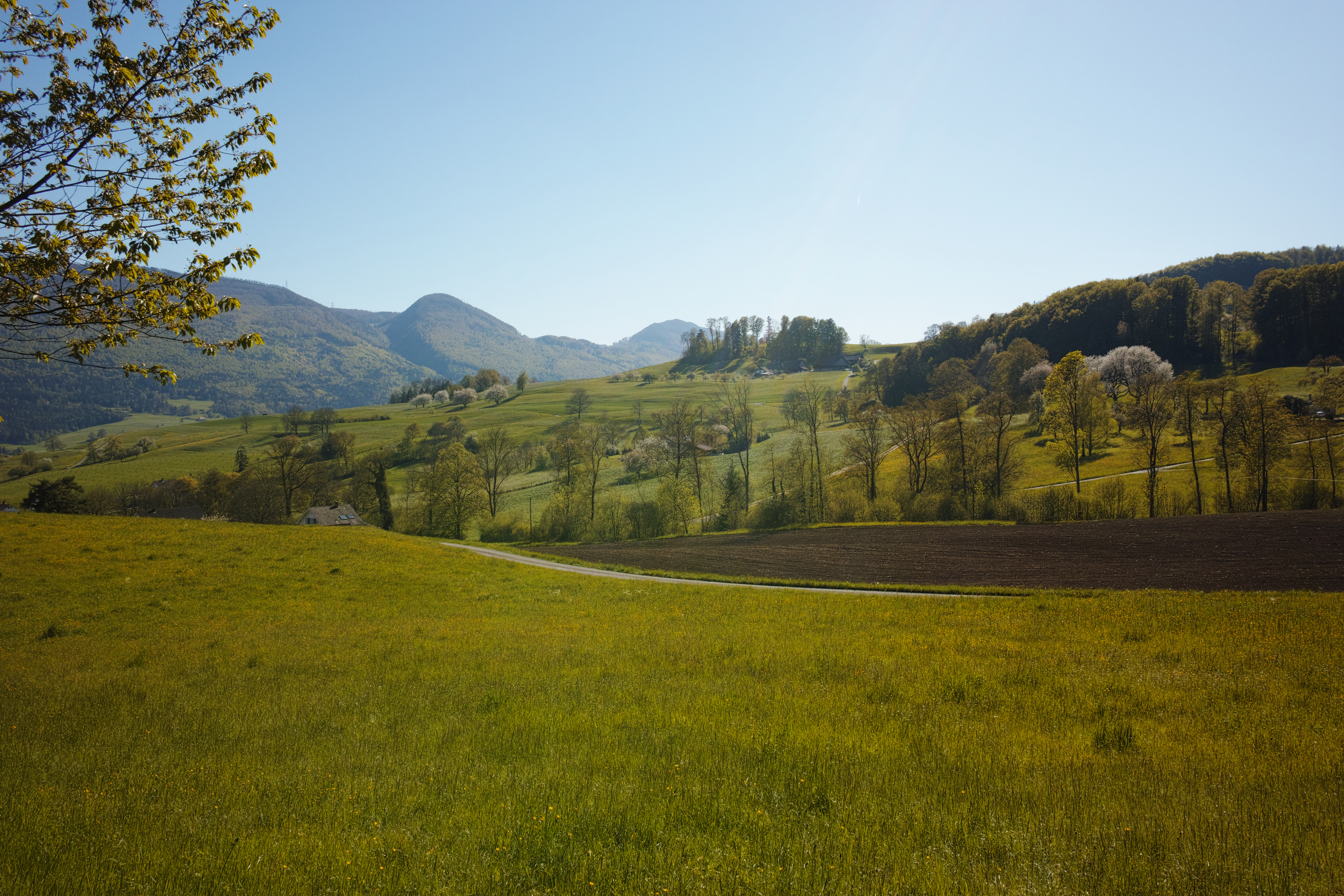
View from a hill north of the centre of Laupersdorf in south-western direction

Aerial view (1955)

Laupersdorf has an area, as of 2009, of 15.51 square kilometers (5.99 sq mi). Of this area, 7.36 km^{2} (2.84 sq mi) or 47.5% is used for agricultural purposes, while 7.23 km^{2} (2.79 sq mi) or 46.6% is forested. Of the rest of the land, 0.9 km^{2} (0.35 sq mi) or 5.8% is settled (buildings or roads), 0.02 km^{2} (4.9 acres) or 0.1% is either rivers or lakes and 0.01 km^{2} (2.5 acres) or 0.1% is unproductive land.

Of the built up area, housing and buildings made up 2.9% and transportation infrastructure made up 2.1%. Out of the forested land, 44.9% of the total land area is heavily forested and 1.7% is covered with orchards or small clusters of trees. Of the agricultural land, 18.6% is used for growing crops and 20.3% is pastures, while 1.3% is used for orchards or vine crops and 7.3% is used for alpine pastures. All the water in the municipality is flowing water.

The municipality is located in the Thal district, in the Dünnern valley. It consists of the linear village of Laupersdorf, the hamlet of Höngen and the Änerholz area with several scattered houses. It is at an altitude of 493 meters (1,617 ft) above sea level and lies 3 km (1.86 mi) in the west of Balsthal (capital of the district of Thal). Laupersdorf is built on the southside at the foot of the Brunnersberg mountain chain in the Jura Mountains.

== Coat of arms ==
The blazon of the municipal coat of arms is Gules, a Number 8 argent.

== Demographics ==
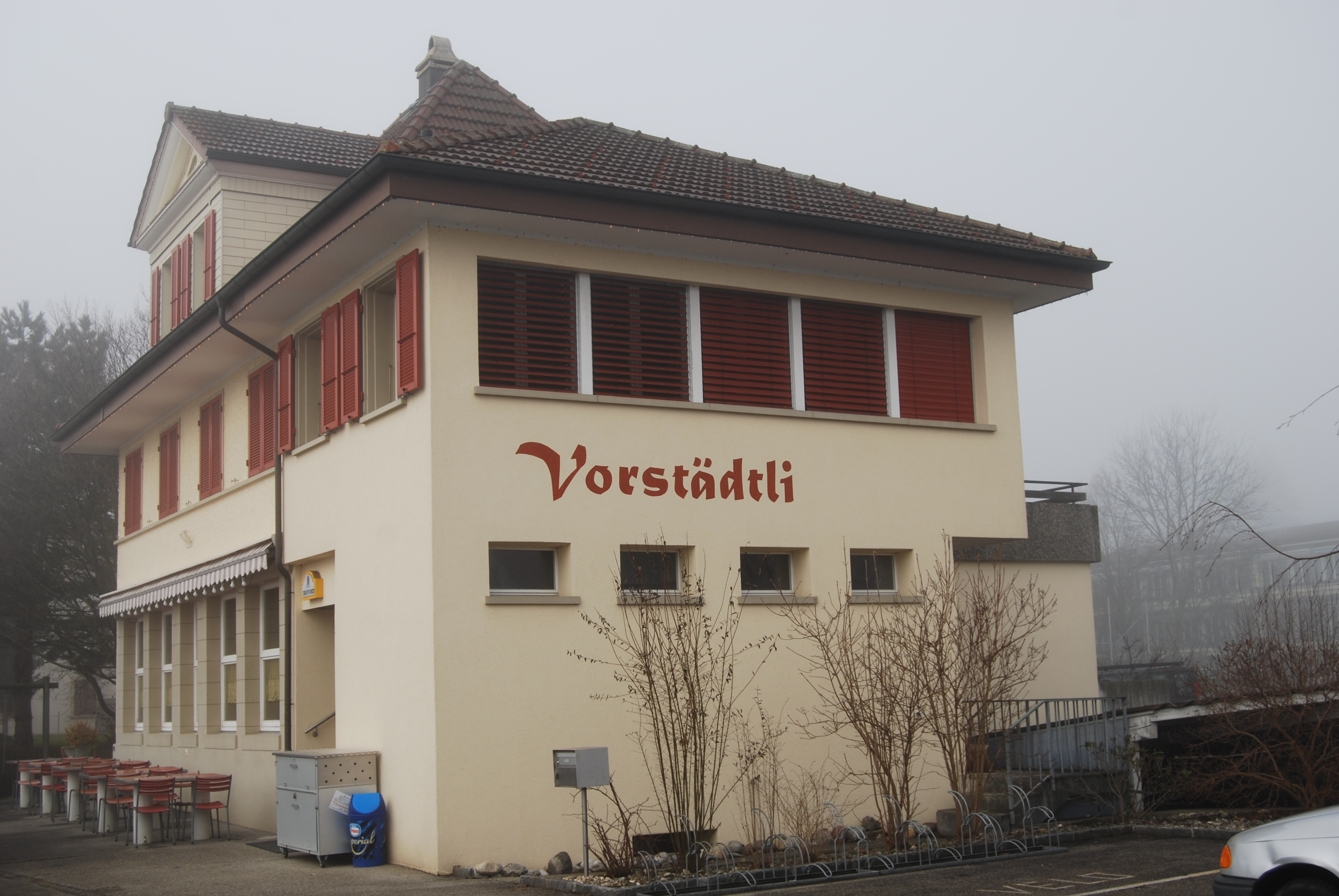
Restaurant Vorstädtli in Laupersdorf

Laupersdorf has a population (as of December 2020) of 1,810. As of 2008, 9.7% of the population are resident foreign nationals. Over the last 10 years (1999–2009 ) the population has changed at a rate of -1.3%.

Most of the population (as of 2000) speaks German (1,543 or 93.5%), with Serbo-Croatian being second most common (31 or 1.9%) and Albanian being third (26 or 1.6%). There are 7 people who speak French and 3 people who speak Romansh.

As of 2008, the gender distribution of the population was 49.9% male and 50.1% female. The population was made up of 747 Swiss men (44.4% of the population) and 93 (5.5%) non-Swiss men. There were 753 Swiss women (44.8%) and 89 (5.3%) non-Swiss women. Of the population in the municipality 799 or about 48.4% were born in Laupersdorf and lived there in 2000. There were 393 or 23.8% who were born in the same canton, while 255 or 15.4% were born somewhere else in Switzerland, and 167 or 10.1% were born outside of Switzerland.

In 2008 there were 17 live births to Swiss citizens and 3 births to non-Swiss citizens, and in same time span there were 14 deaths of Swiss citizens. Ignoring immigration and emigration, the population of Swiss citizens increased by 3 while the foreign population increased by 3. There were 2 Swiss men and 2 Swiss women who immigrated back to Switzerland. At the same time, there were 7 non-Swiss women who immigrated from another country to Switzerland. The total Swiss population change in 2008 (from all sources, including moves across municipal borders) was a decrease of 22 and the non-Swiss population increased by 10 people. This represents a population growth rate of -0.7%.

The age distribution, as of 2000, in Laupersdorf is; 150 children or 9.1% of the population are between 0 and 6 years old and 310 teenagers or 18.8% are between 7 and 19. Of the adult population, 101 people or 6.1% of the population are between 20 and 24 years old. 464 people or 28.1% are between 25 and 44, and 370 people or 22.4% are between 45 and 64. The senior population distribution is 184 people or 11.1% of the population are between 65 and 79 years old and there are 72 people or 4.4% who are over 80.

As of 2000, there were 697 people who were single and never married in the municipality. There were 793 married individuals, 98 widows or widowers and 63 individuals who are divorced.

As of 2000, there were 619 private households in the municipality, and an average of 2.7 persons per household. There were 161 households that consist of only one person and 74 households with five or more people. Out of a total of 627 households that answered this question, 25.7% were households made up of just one person and there were 6 adults who lived with their parents. Of the rest of the households, there are 176 married couples without children, 243 married couples with children There were 25 single parents with a child or children. There were 8 households that were made up of unrelated people and 8 households that were made up of some sort of institution or another collective housing.

In 2000 there were 341 single family homes (or 71.0% of the total) out of a total of 480 inhabited buildings. There were 50 multi-family buildings (10.4%), along with 70 multi-purpose buildings that were mostly used for housing (14.6%) and 19 other use buildings (commercial or industrial) that also had some housing (4.0%). Of the single family homes 33 were built before 1919, while 46 were built between 1990 and 2000. The greatest number of single family homes (65) were built between 1946 and 1960.

In 2000 there were 655 apartments in the municipality. The most common apartment size was 5 rooms of which there were 197. There were 7 single room apartments and 316 apartments with five or more rooms. Of these apartments, a total of 602 apartments (91.9% of the total) were permanently occupied, while 26 apartments (4.0%) were seasonally occupied and 27 apartments (4.1%) were empty. As of 2009, the construction rate of new housing units was 2.4 new units per 1000 residents. The vacancy rate for the municipality, in 2010, was 1.84%.

The historical population is given in the following chart:

== Sights ==
The entire town of Höngen is part of the Inventory of Swiss Heritage Sites.

== Politics ==
In the 2007 federal election the most popular party was the CVP which received 42.11% of the vote. The next three most popular parties were the SVP (27.21%), the FDP (16.14%) and the SP (7.05%). In the federal election, a total of 679 votes were cast, and the voter turnout was 55.4%.

== Economy ==
As of 2010, Laupersdorf had an unemployment rate of 3.1%. As of 2008, there were 90 people employed in the primary economic sector and about 34 businesses involved in this sector. 145 people were employed in the secondary sector and there were 20 businesses in this sector. 103 people were employed in the tertiary sector, with 31 businesses in this sector. There were 831 residents of the municipality who were employed in some capacity, of which females made up 40.3% of the workforce.

In 2008 the total number of full-time equivalent jobs was 259. The number of jobs in the primary sector was 56, of which 51 were in agriculture and 5 were in forestry or lumber production. The number of jobs in the secondary sector was 126 of which 70 or (55.6%) were in manufacturing and 56 (44.4%) were in construction. The number of jobs in the tertiary sector was 77. In the tertiary sector; 32 or 41.6% were in wholesale or retail sales or the repair of motor vehicles, 1 was in the movement and storage of goods, 12 or 15.6% were in a hotel or restaurant, 2 or 2.6% were the insurance or financial industry, 7 or 9.1% were technical professionals or scientists, 13 or 16.9% were in education and 2 or 2.6% were in health care.

In 2000, there were 139 workers who commuted into the municipality and 610 workers who commuted away. The municipality is a net exporter of workers, with about 4.4 workers leaving the municipality for every one entering. Of the working population, 11.9% used public transportation to get to work, and 63.7% used a private car.

== Religion ==
From the 2000 census, 1,188 or 72.0% were Roman Catholic, while 256 or 15.5% belonged to the Swiss Reformed Church. Of the rest of the population, there were 8 members of an Orthodox church (or about 0.48% of the population), there was 1 individual who belongs to the Christian Catholic Church, and there were 17 individuals (or about 1.03% of the population) who belonged to another Christian church. There were 75 (or about 4.54% of the population) who were Islamic. 71 (or about 4.30% of the population) belonged to no church, are agnostic or atheist, and 34 individuals (or about 2.06% of the population) did not answer the question.

== Education ==
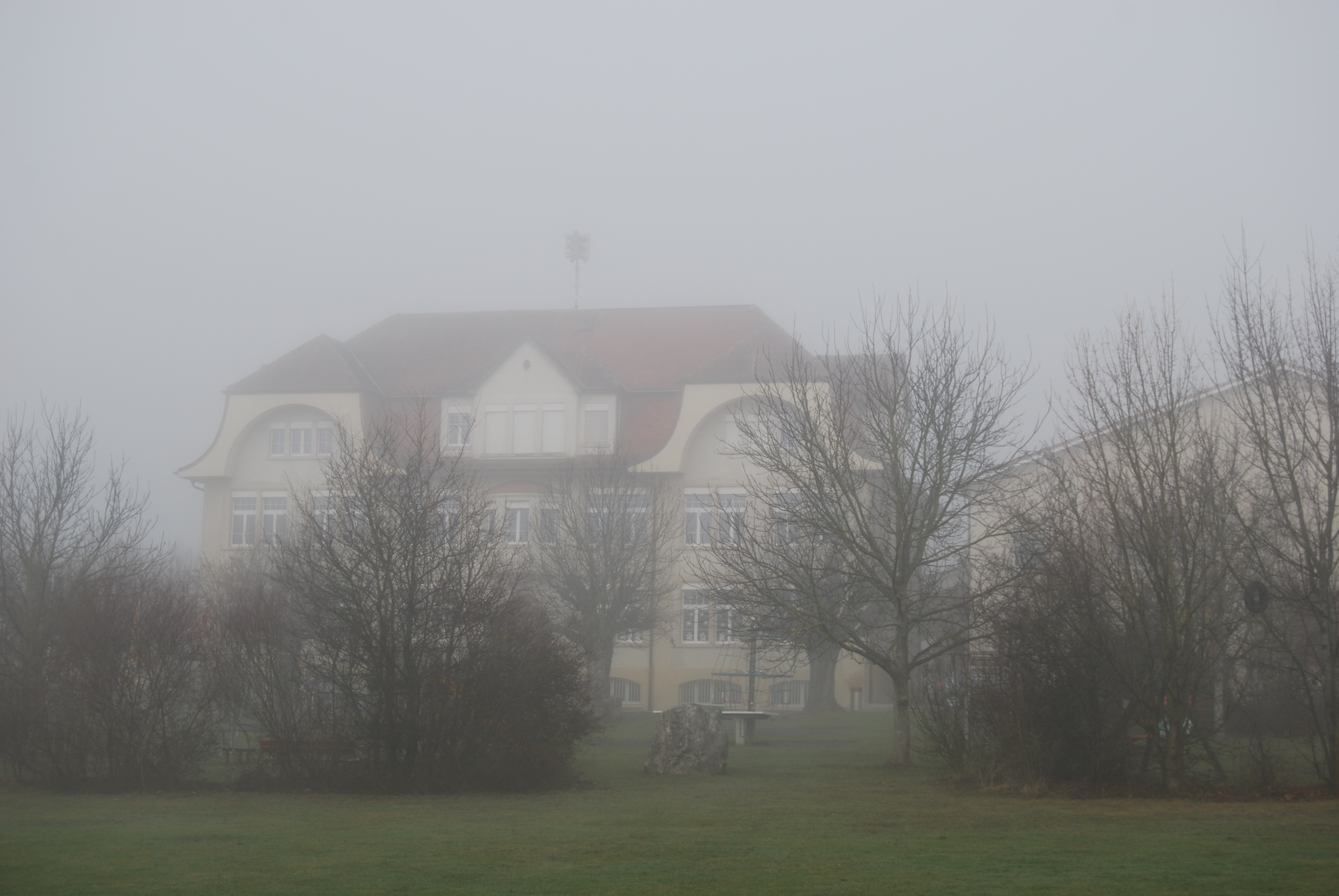
Village school on a foggy day

In Laupersdorf about 648 or (39.2%) of the population have completed non-mandatory upper secondary education, and 96 or (5.8%) have completed additional higher education (either university or a Fachhochschule). Of the 96 who completed tertiary schooling, 79.2% were Swiss men, 14.6% were Swiss women.

During the 2010–2011 school year there were a total of 158 students in the Laupersdorf school system. The education system in the Canton of Solothurn allows young children to attend two years of non-obligatory Kindergarten. During that school year, there were 34 children in kindergarten. The canton's school system requires students to attend six years of primary school, with some of the children attending smaller, specialized classes. In the municipality there were 124 students in primary school. The secondary school program consists of three lower, obligatory years of schooling, followed by three to five years of optional, advanced schools. All the lower secondary students from Laupersdorf attend their school in a neighboring municipality.

As of 2000, there were 56 students in Laupersdorf who came from another municipality, while 116 residents attended schools outside the municipality.

Laupersdorf is home to the Schul- und Gemeindebibliothek Laupersdorf (municipal library of Laupersdorf). The library has (as of 2008) 6,916 books or other media, and loaned out 15,057 items in the same year. It was open a total of 130 days with average of 6 hours per week during that year.

== Transports ==
Laupersdorf is easy to reach as the main road from Oensingen to Moutier pass it. Furthermore, there is a public transport line which 3 different stops in the village.
