= Rumisberg =

- Municipality
- Flag Coat of arms
- Location of Rumisberg
- Location within Switzerland Location within Canton of Bern
- Coordinates: 47°16′N 7°38′E
- Country: Switzerland
- Canton: Bern
- District: Oberaargau

Area
  - Total: 5.2 km^{2} (2.0 sq mi)
- Elevation: 638 m (2,093 ft)

Population (December 2020)
  - Total: 491
  - Density: 94/km^{2} (240/sq mi)
- Time zone: UTC+01:00 (CET)
  - Summer (DST): UTC+02:00 (CEST)
- Postal code: 4539
- SFOS number: 987
- ISO 3166 code: CH-BE
- Surrounded by: Aedermannsdorf (SO), Attiswil, Farnern, Herbetswil (SO), Matzendorf (SO), Oberbipp, Wiedlisbach, Wolfisberg
- Website: www.rumisberg.ch

Rumisberg is a municipality in the Oberaargau administrative district in the canton of Bern in Switzerland.

== History ==
Rumisberg is first mentioned in 1364 as Rumolsberg.

== Geography ==
Rumisberg has an area of 5.2 km^{2} (2.0 sq mi). Of this area, 49.8% is used for agricultural purposes, while 42.1% is forested. Of the rest of the land, 7.4% is settled (buildings or roads) and the remainder (0.8%) is non-productive (rivers, glaciers or mountains).

The municipality includes the village of Rumisberg, the hamlets of Schoren and Weissacker-Falken and scattered individual houses. It is located on several terraces scattered along the southern slope of the Jura Mountains, ranging in altitude from 550 to 1,232 meters (1,804 to 4,042 ft) above sea level.

== Demographics ==
Rumisberg has a population (as of 31 December 2020) of 491. As of 2007, 3.4% of the population was made up of foreign nationals. Over the last 10 years the population has grown at a rate of 11.3%. Most of the population (as of 2000) speaks German (98.5%), with Italian being second most common ( 0.4%) and Serbo-Croatian being third ( 0.4%).

In the 2007 election the most popular party was the SVP which received 52.8% of the vote. The next three most popular parties were the SPS (14.8%), the FDP (14.5%) and the Green Party (10.1%).

The age distribution of the population (as of 2000) is children and teenagers (0–19 years old) make up 24% of the population, while adults (20–64 years old) make up 61.1% and seniors (over 64 years old) make up 14.9%. In Rumisberg about 78.5% of the population (between age 25-64) have completed either non-mandatory upper secondary education or additional higher education (either university or a Fachhochschule).

Rumisberg has an unemployment rate of 1.19%. As of 2005, there were 23 people employed in the primary economic sector and about 11 businesses involved in this sector. 8 people are employed in the secondary sector and there are 4 businesses in this sector. 24 people are employed in the tertiary sector, with 8 businesses in this sector. The historical population is given in the following table:

year	population
1764	301
1850	471
1900	353
1950	391
2000	455
