= Wolfisberg =

- Former municipality
- Flag Coat of arms
- Location of Wolfisberg
- Location within Switzerland Location within Canton of Bern
- Coordinates: 47°16′N 7°40′E
- Country: Switzerland
- Canton: Bern
- District: Oberaargau

Area
  - Total: 2.4 km^{2} (0.93 sq mi)
- Elevation: 670 m (2,200 ft)

Population (December 2020)
  - Total: 187
  - Density: 78/km^{2} (200/sq mi)
- Time zone: UTC+01:00 (CET)
  - Summer (DST): UTC+02:00 (CEST)
- Postal code: 4704
- SFOS number: 996
- ISO 3166 code: CH-BE
- Surrounded by: Laupersdorf (SO), Matzendorf (SO), Niederbipp, Oberbipp, Rumisberg
- Website: www.wolfisberg.ch

Wolfisberg is a former municipality in the Oberaargau administrative district in the canton of Bern in Switzerland. On 1 January 2020 the former municipality of Wolfisberg merged into Niederbipp.

== Geography ==
Wolfisberg has an area of 2.4 km^{2} (0.93 sq mi). Of this area, 45.7% is used for agricultural purposes, while 49.8% is forested. The rest of the land, (4.5%) is settled.

== Demographics ==
Wolfisberg has a population (as of 31 December 2020) of 187. As of 2007, 2.7% of the population was made up of foreign nationals. Over the last 10 years the population has decreased at a rate of -1.6%. Most of the population (as of 2000) speaks German (96.6%), with Albanian being second most common ( 1.7%) and French being third ( 1.1%).

In the 2007 election the most popular party was the SVP which received 45.1% of the vote. The next three most popular parties were the SPS (19.8%), the Green Party (16%) and the FDP (8.3%).

The age distribution of the population (as of 2000) is children and teenagers (0–19 years old) make up 24.7% of the population, while adults (20–64 years old) make up 59.8% and seniors (over 64 years old) make up 15.5%. In Wolfisberg about 81.2% of the population (between age 25-64) have completed either non-mandatory upper secondary education or additional higher education (either university or a Fachhochschule).

Wolfisberg has an unemployment rate of 0%. As of 2005, there were 9 people employed in the primary economic sector and about 4 businesses involved in this sector. 1 person is employed in the secondary sector and there is 1 business in this sector. 5 people are employed in the tertiary sector, with 2 businesses in this sector.
