= Drei Höfe =

- Municipality
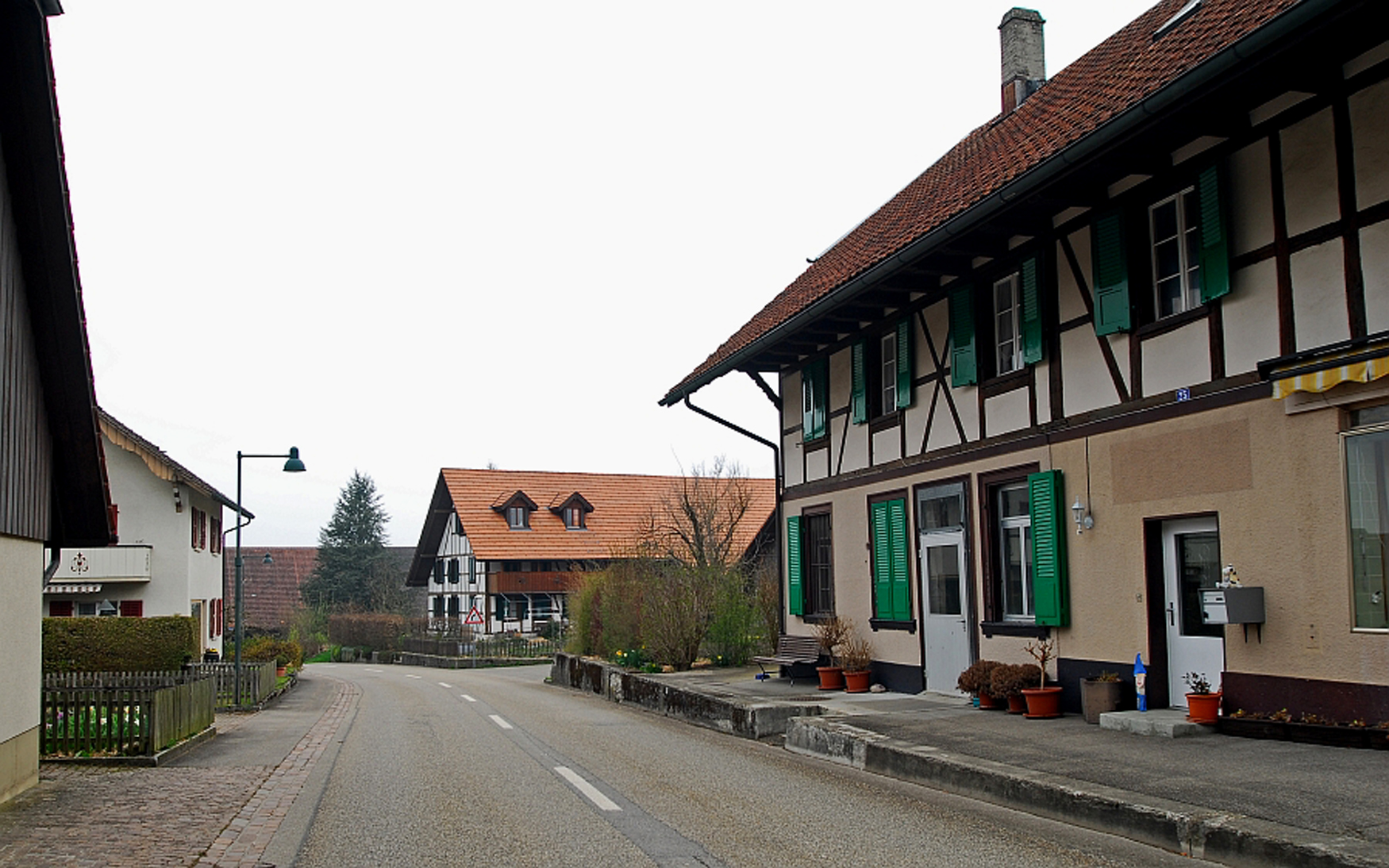
- Heriswil main street

- Coat of arms
- Location of Drei Höfe
- Location within Switzerland Location within Canton of Solothurn
- Coordinates: 47°10′N 7°38′E
- Country: Switzerland
- Canton: Solothurn
- District: Wasseramt

Area
  - Total: 4.56 km^{2} (1.76 sq mi)

Population (Dec 2011)
  - Total: 720
  - Density: 160/km^{2} (410/sq mi)
- Time zone: UTC+01:00 (CET)
  - Summer (DST): UTC+02:00 (CEST)
- Postal code: 4558
- SFOS number: 2535
- ISO 3166 code: CH-SO
- Surrounded by: Aeschi, Etziken, Halten, Horriwil, Oekingen
- Website: www.dreihoefe.ch

Drei Höfe is a municipality in the district of Wasseramt in the canton of Solothurn in Switzerland. On 1 January 2013 the former municipalities of Heinrichswil-Winistorf and Hersiwil merged to form the new municipality of Drei Höfe.

== History ==
Heinrichswil is first mentioned in 1317 as Cristan von Heinrichswile.

Hersiwil is first mentioned in 1324 as Hersenwile. It formed a double municipality with Heinrichswil until 1798, when Winistorf joined the other two to form the triple municipality of Hersiwil-Heinrichswil-Winistorf. In 1854 it split into three, separate, independent municipalities. In 1993, Heinrichswil and Winistorf merged again, but Hersiwil remained independent.

== Geography ==
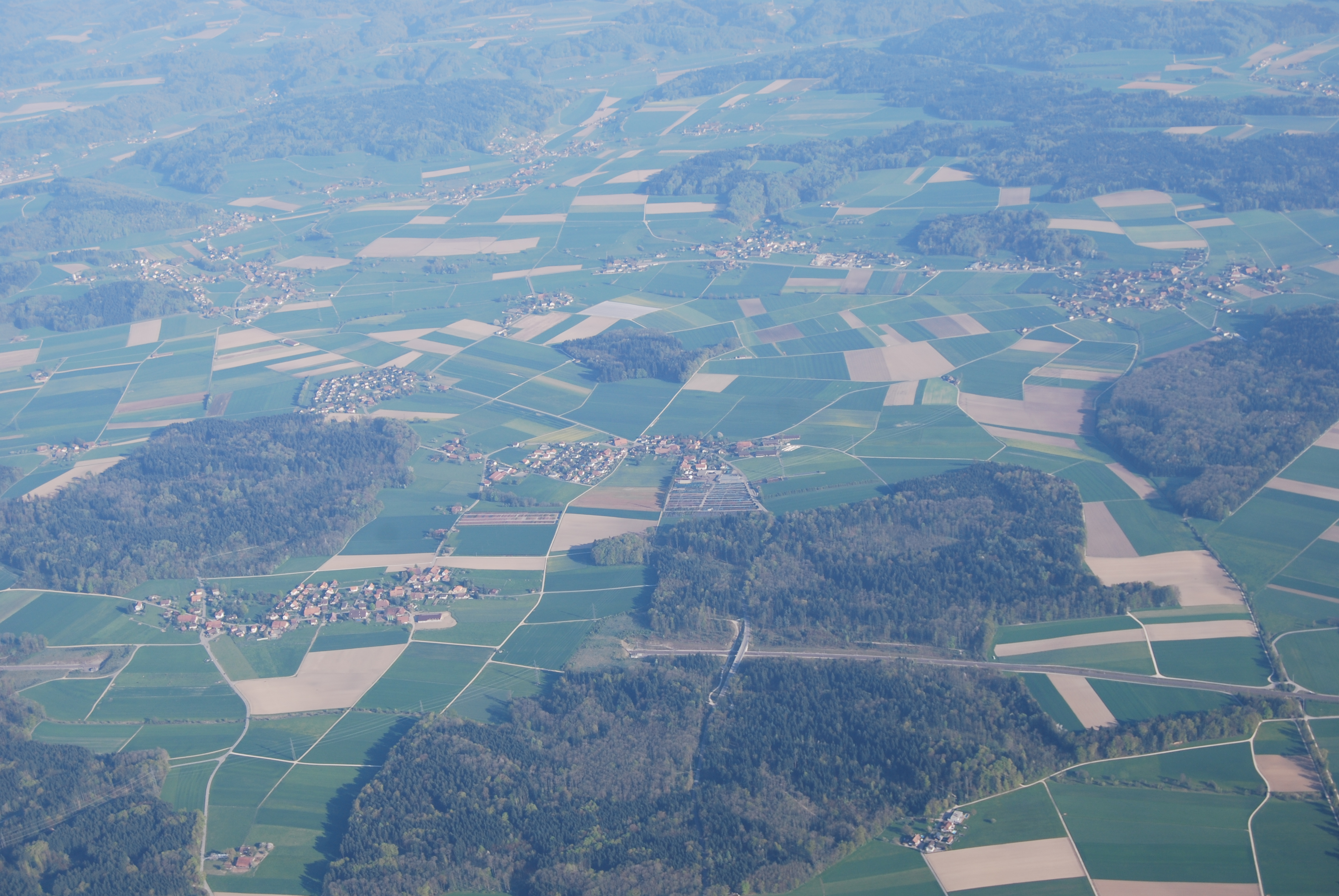
Aerial view of Heinrichswil, Winistorf and Hersiwil villages

The former municipalities that now make up Drei Höfe have a total combined area of 4.58 km^{2} (1.77 sq mi).

Heinrichswil-Winistorf had an area, as of 2009, of 3.13 square kilometers (1.21 sq mi). Of this area, 1.59 km^{2} (0.61 sq mi) or 50.8% is used for agricultural purposes, while 1.26 km^{2} (0.49 sq mi) or 40.3% is forested. Of the rest of the land, 0.25 km^{2} (0.097 sq mi) or 8.0% is settled (buildings or roads). The former municipality is located on a hill built up from a moraine on the road between Halten and Seeberg. It consists of the villages of Heinrichswil and Winistorf.

Hersiwil had an area, as of 2009, of 1.43 square kilometers (0.55 sq mi). Of this area, 0.97 km^{2} (0.37 sq mi) or 67.8% is used for agricultural purposes, while 0.32 km^{2} (0.12 sq mi) or 22.4% is forested. Of the rest of the land, 0.09 km^{2} (22 acres) or 6.3% is settled (buildings or roads), 0.02 km^{2} (4.9 acres) or 1.4% is either rivers or lakes and 0.01 km^{2} (2.5 acres) or 0.7% is unproductive land.

== Demographics ==
The total population of Drei Höfe (as of December 2020) is 748.

== Historic Population ==
The historical population is given in the following chart:
