= Derendingen =

Derendingen may refer to the following places:

- Derendingen, Switzerland, in the Canton of Solothurn
- Derendingen, Germany, a part of Tübingen, Baden-Württemberg
