= Wasseramt District =

District of Solothurn, Switzerland

Coordinates: 47°10′N 7°35′E

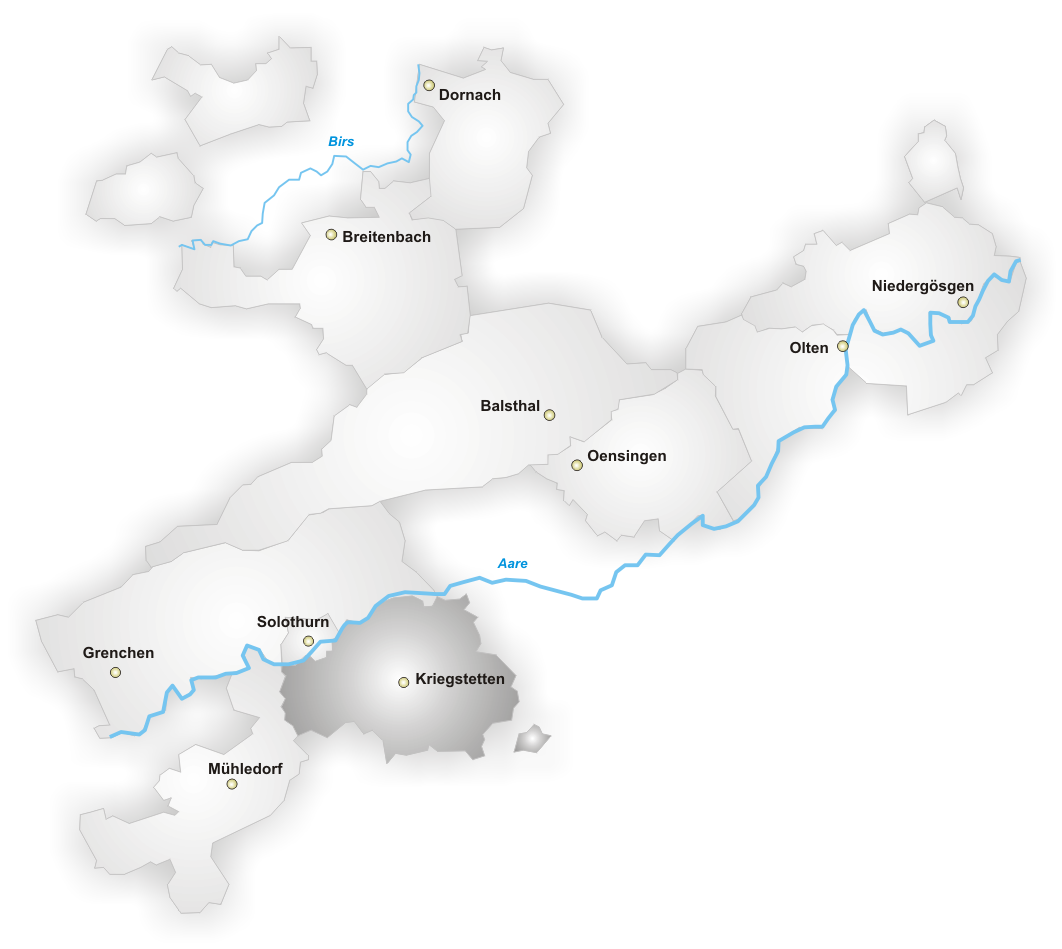
Wasseramt District, canton of Solothurn

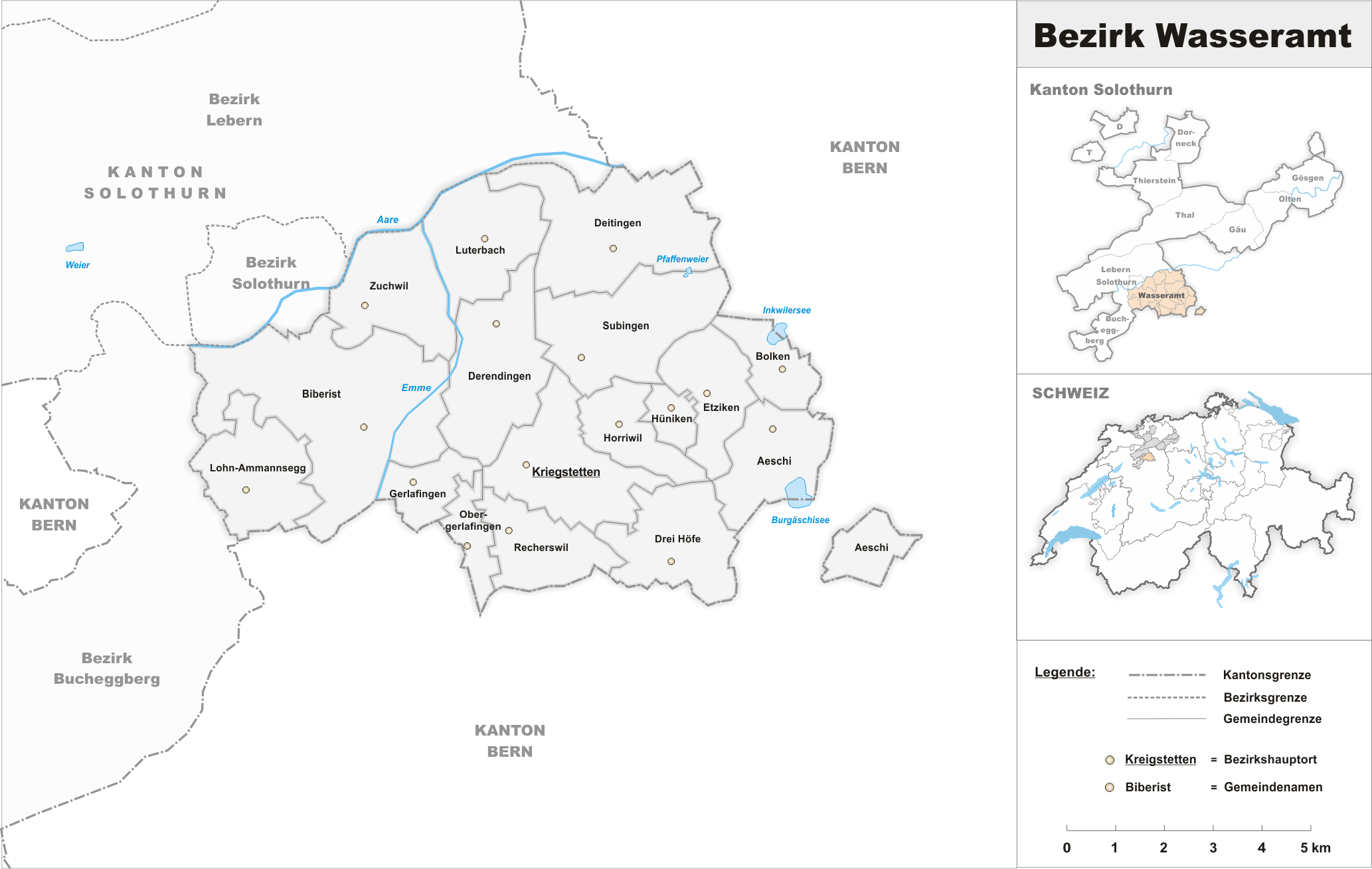
Municipalities of Wasseramt District

Wasseramt District is one of the ten districts of the canton of Solothurn in Switzerland, situated to the south of the canton. Together with the Bucheggberg District, it forms the Amtei (electoral district) of Wasseramt-Bucheggberg. It has a population of 52,949 (as of 31 December 2020).

== Municipalities ==
Wasseramt District contains the following municipalities:

Coat of arms	Municipality	Population (31 December 2020)	Area, km^{2}
Aeschi SO	Aeschi	1,268	5.48
Biberist	Biberist	9,109	12.24
Bolken	Bolken	590	2.13
Deitingen	Deitingen	2,227	7.63
Derendingen	Derendingen	6,592	5.62
Drei Höfe	Drei Höfe	748	4.58
Etziken	Etziken	973	3.38
Gerlafingen	Gerlafingen	5,502	1.91
Horriwil	Horriwil	836	2.60
Hüniken	Hüniken	153	1.01
Kriegstetten	Kriegstetten	1,292	1.13
Lohn-Ammannsegg	Lohn-Ammannsegg	2,870	4.46
Luterbach	Luterbach	3,555	4.54
Obergerlafingen	Obergerlafingen	1,247	1.52
Recherswil	Recherswil	2,028	3.33
Subingen	Subingen	3,173	6.22
Zuchwil	Zuchwil	9,058	4.67
	Total	52,949	76.62

== Mergers and name changes ==
- On 1 January 1993 the former municipalities of Heinrichswil and Winistorf merged to form the new municipality of Heinrichswil-Winistorf and Ammannsegg and Lohn merged to form the new municipality of Lohn-Ammannsegg. At the same time, Burgäschi merged into the municipality of Aeschi.
- On 1 January 2012 the municipality of Steinhof merged into the municipality of Aeschi.
- On 1 January 2013 the former municipalities of Heinrichswil-Winistorf and Hersiwil merged to form the new municipality of Drei Höfe.
- On 1 January 2026 the municipalities of Halten and Oekingen merged into the municipality of Kriegstetten.

== Geography ==
Wasseramt has an area, as of 2009, of 76.63 square kilometers (29.59 sq mi). Of this area, 36.05 km^{2} (13.92 sq mi) or 47.0% is used for agricultural purposes, while 20.09 km^{2} (7.76 sq mi) or 26.2% is forested. Of the rest of the land, 19.33 km^{2} (7.46 sq mi) or 25.2% is settled (buildings or roads), 1.05 km^{2} (0.41 sq mi) or 1.4% is either rivers or lakes and 0.11 km^{2} (27 acres) or 0.1% is unproductive land.

Of the built up area, industrial buildings made up 2.9% of the total area while housing and buildings made up 12.9% and transportation infrastructure made up 6.6%. while parks, green belts and sports fields made up 2.0%. Out of the forested land, 25.1% of the total land area is heavily forested and 1.1% is covered with orchards or small clusters of trees. Of the agricultural land, 45.5% is used for growing crops, while 1.5% is used for orchards or vine crops. Of the water in the district, 0.3% is in lakes and 1.1% is in rivers and streams.

== Coat of arms ==
Coat of Arms of the Wasseramt district

The blazon of the municipal coat of arms is Bendy sinistery Gules and Argent.

== Demographics ==
Wasseramt has a population (as of December 2020) of 52,949.

Most of the population (as of 2000) speaks German (40,267 or 86.9%), with Italian being second most common (1,778 or 3.8%) and Serbo-Croatian being third (989 or 2.1%). There are 312 people who speak French and 21 people who speak Romansh.

As of 2008, the gender distribution of the population was 49.5% male and 50.5% female. The population was made up of 18,059 Swiss men (37.2% of the population) and 5,947 (12.3%) non-Swiss men. There were 19,329 Swiss women (39.9%) and 5,148 (10.6%) non-Swiss women. Of the population in the district 12,501 or about 27.0% were born in Wasseramt and lived there in 2000. There were 12,916 or 27.9% who were born in the same canton, while 11,211 or 24.2% were born somewhere else in Switzerland, and 8,209 or 17.7% were born outside of Switzerland.

In 2008 there were 289 live births to Swiss citizens and 137 births to non-Swiss citizens, and in same time span there were 374 deaths of Swiss citizens and 29 non-Swiss citizen deaths. Ignoring immigration and emigration, the population of Swiss citizens decreased by 85 while the foreign population increased by 108. There were 51 Swiss men and 20 Swiss women who immigrated back to Switzerland. At the same time, there were 157 non-Swiss men and 94 non-Swiss women who immigrated from another country to Switzerland. The total Swiss population change in 2008 (from all sources, including moves across municipal borders) was an increase of 9 and the non-Swiss population increased by 180 people. This represents a population growth rate of 0.4%.

As of 2000, there were 18,418 people who were single and never married in the district. There were 22,576 married individuals, 2,718 widows or widowers and 2,607 individuals who are divorced.

There were 5,997 households that consist of only one person and 1,264 households with five or more people. Out of a total of 19,578 households that answered this question, 30.6% were households made up of just one person and 123 were adults who lived with their parents. Of the rest of the households, there are 5,859 married couples without children, 6,107 married couples with children There were 990 single parents with a child or children. There were 233 households that were made up unrelated people and 269 households that were made some sort of institution or another collective housing.

The historical population is given in the following chart:

== Politics ==
In the 2007 federal election the most popular party was the SVP which received 25.86% of the vote. The next three most popular parties were the SP (23.31%), the FDP (19.91%) and the CVP (18.69%). In the federal election, a total of 14,587 votes were cast, and the voter turnout was 46.9%.

== Religion ==
From the 2000 census, 16,396 or 35.4% were Roman Catholic, while 16,391 or 35.4% belonged to the Swiss Reformed Church. Of the rest of the population, there were 915 members of an Orthodox church (or about 1.98% of the population), there were 214 individuals (or about 0.46% of the population) who belonged to the Christian Catholic Church, and there were 820 individuals (or about 1.77% of the population) who belonged to another Christian church. There were 15 individuals (or about 0.03% of the population) who were Jewish, and 3,218 (or about 6.95% of the population) who were Islamic. There were 128 individuals who were Buddhist, 345 individuals who were Hindu and 43 individuals who belonged to another church. 6,536 (or about 14.11% of the population) belonged to no church, are agnostic or atheist, and 1,298 individuals (or about 2.80% of the population) did not answer the question.

== Education ==
In Wasseramt about 17,947 or (38.7%) of the population have completed non-mandatory upper secondary education, and 4,800 or (10.4%) have completed additional higher education (either University or a Fachhochschule). Of the 4,800 who completed tertiary schooling, 70.8% were Swiss men, 19.1% were Swiss women, 7.1% were non-Swiss men and 3.0% were non-Swiss women.

During the 2010–2011 school year there were a total of 736 students in the Wasseramt district school system. The education system in the Canton of Solothurn allows young children to attend two years of non-obligatory Kindergarten. During that school year, there were no children in kindergarten. The canton's school system requires students to attend six years of primary school, with some of the children attending smaller, specialized classes. In the district there were no students in primary school and 18 students in the special, smaller classes. The secondary school program consists of three lower, obligatory years of schooling, followed by three to five years of optional, advanced schools. 718 lower secondary students attend school within the Wasseramt school district.
