= Zuchwil =

- Municipality
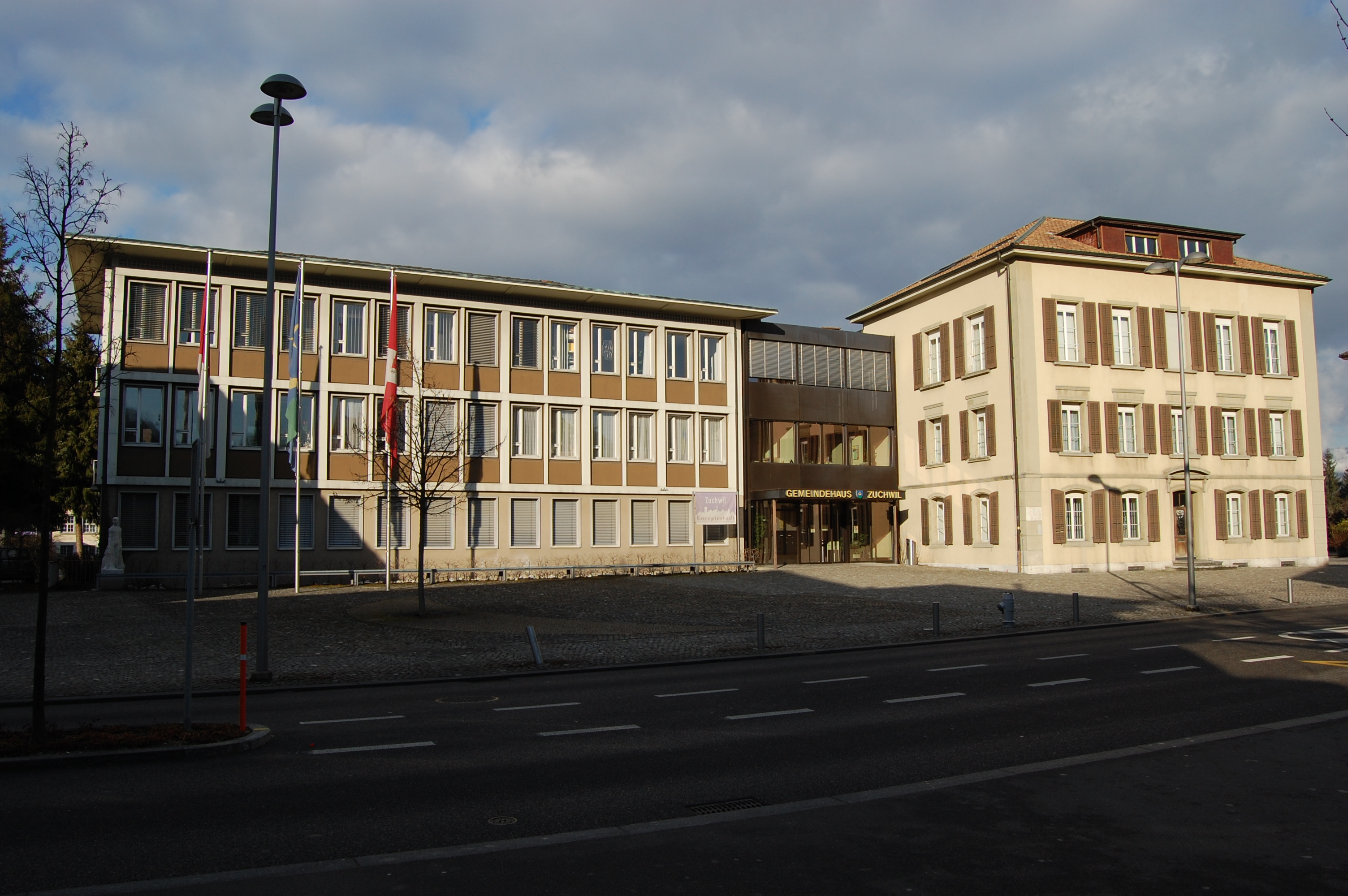
- Municipal administration of Zuchwil

- Flag Coat of arms
- Location of Zuchwil
- Location within Switzerland Location within Canton of Solothurn
- Coordinates: 47°12′N 7°34′E
- Country: Switzerland
- Canton: Solothurn
- District: Wasseramt

Area
  - Total: 4.63 km^{2} (1.79 sq mi)
- Elevation: 433 m (1,421 ft)

Population (December 2020)
  - Total: 9,058
  - Density: 1,960/km^{2} (5,070/sq mi)
- Time zone: UTC+01:00 (CET)
  - Summer (DST): UTC+02:00 (CEST)
- Postal code: 4528
- SFOS number: 2534
- ISO 3166 code: CH-SO
- Surrounded by: Biberist, Derendingen, Feldbrunnen-Sankt Niklaus, Luterbach, Riedholz, Solothurn
- Website: www.zuchwil.ch

Zuchwil (Swiss Standard German: [tsʊxˈviːl]) is a municipality in the district of Wasseramt in the canton of Solothurn in northwestern Switzerland.

== History ==
Zuchwil is first mentioned in 1052 as Zuchwile.

== Geography ==
Aerial view (1953)

Zuchwil is located in the Wasseramt district, in a triangle formed by the Aare and Emme rivers and the Bleichenberg / Birchi mountains near Solothurn.

The municipality has an area, as of 2009, of 4.63 square kilometers (1.79 sq mi). Of this area, 1.15 km^{2} (0.44 sq mi) or 24.8% is used for agricultural purposes, while 0.89 km^{2} (0.34 sq mi) or 19.2% is forested. Of the rest of the land, 2.45 km^{2} (0.95 sq mi) or 52.9% is settled (buildings or roads), 0.18 km^{2} (0.069 sq mi) or 3.9% is either rivers or lakes.

Of the built up area, industrial buildings made up 9.3% of the total area while housing and buildings made up 21.8% and transportation infrastructure made up 13.6%. Power and water infrastructure as well as other special developed areas made up 2.6% of the area while parks, green belts and sports fields made up 5.6%. Out of the forested land, all of the forested land area is covered with heavy forests. Of the agricultural land, 19.2% is used for growing crops and 3.9% is pastures, while 1.7% is used for orchards or vine crops. All the water in the municipality is flowing water.

== Coat of arms ==
The blazon of the municipal coat of arms is Azure a Mullet of Five and a Moon increscent Or over a Mount of 3 Coupeaux Vert.

== Demographics ==
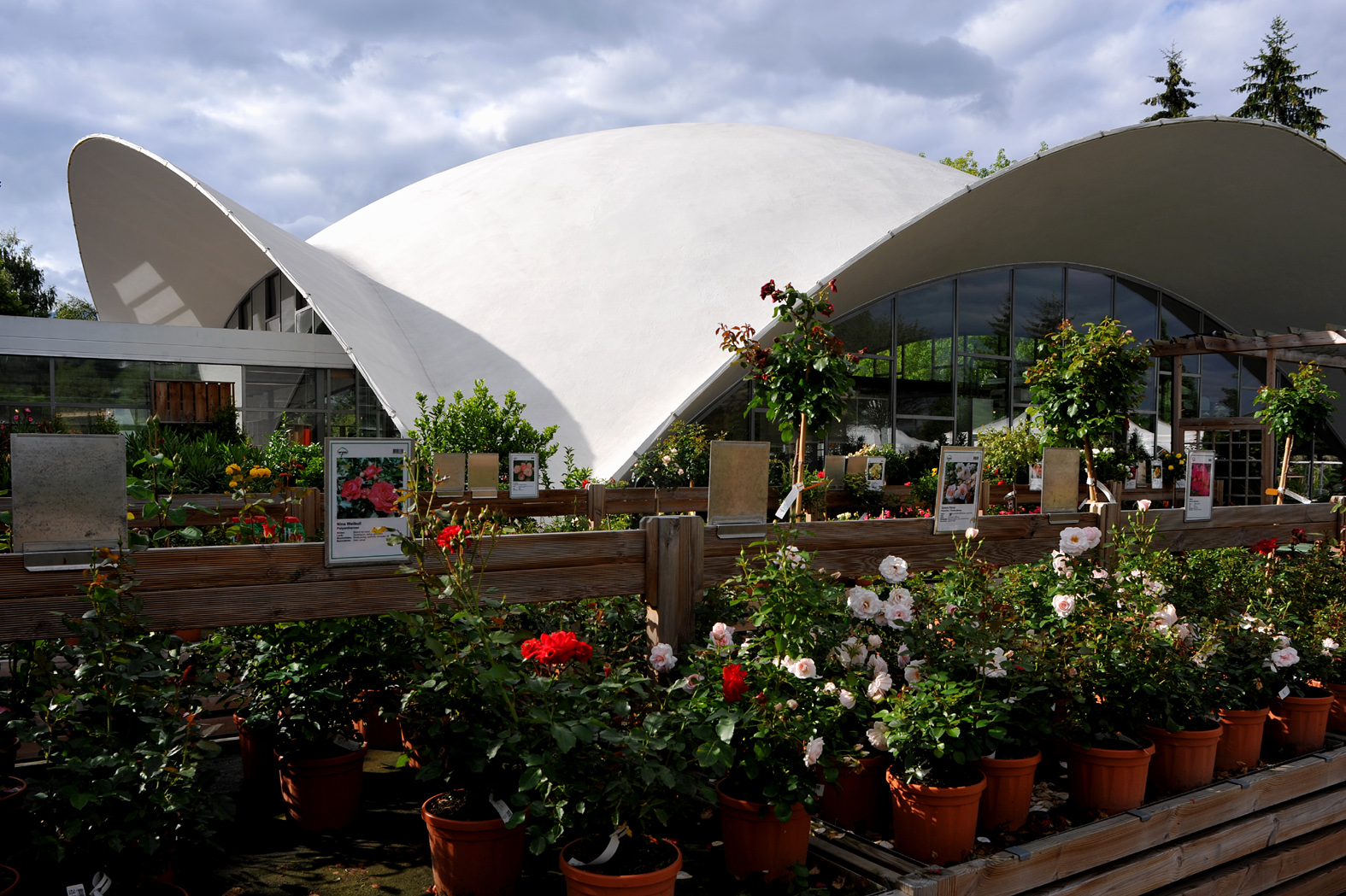
Concrete shell roof (Isler shell) of the Wyss garden center in Zuchwil, built in 1962

Zuchwil has a population (as of December 2020) of 9,058. As of 2008, 40.1% of the population are resident foreign nationals. Over the last 10 years (1999–2009) the population has changed at a rate of -3.9%. It has changed at a rate of -0.8% due to migration and at a rate of 1.1% due to births and deaths.

Most of the population (as of 2000) speaks German (6,842 or 76.7%), with Italian being second most common (545 or 6.1%) and Serbo-Croatian being third (384 or 4.3%). There are 73 people who speak French and 8 people who speak Romansh.

As of 2008, the gender distribution of the population was 49.5% male and 50.5% female. The population was made up of 2,455 Swiss men (27.7% of the population) and 1,930 (21.8%) non-Swiss men. There were 2,731 Swiss women (30.8%) and 1,746 (19.7%) non-Swiss women. Of the population in the municipality 1,941 or about 21.8% were born in Zuchwil and lived there in 2000. There were 2,084 or 23.4% who were born in the same canton, while 1,955 or 21.9% were born somewhere else in Switzerland, and 2,597 or 29.1% were born outside of Switzerland.

In 2008 there were 49 live births to Swiss citizens and 39 births to non-Swiss citizens, and in same time span there were 66 deaths of Swiss citizens and 9 non-Swiss citizen deaths. Ignoring immigration and emigration, the population of Swiss citizens decreased by 17 while the foreign population increased by 30. There were 27 Swiss men and 9 Swiss women who immigrated back to Switzerland. At the same time, there were 50 non-Swiss men and 34 non-Swiss women who immigrated from another country to Switzerland. The total Swiss population change in 2008 (from all sources, including moves across municipal borders) was a decrease of 16 and the non-Swiss population increased by 14 people. This represents a population growth rate of 0.0%.

The age distribution, as of 2000, in Zuchwil is; 666 children or 7.5% of the population are between 0 and 6 years old and 1,291 teenagers or 14.5% are between 7 and 19. Of the adult population, 538 people or 6.0% of the population are between 20 and 24 years old. 2,966 people or 33.2% are between 25 and 44, and 2,143 people or 24.0% are between 45 and 64. The senior population distribution is 983 people or 11.0% of the population are between 65 and 79 years old and there are 335 people or 3.8% who are over 80.

As of 2000, there were 3,546 people who were single and never married in the municipality. There were 4,241 married individuals, 491 widows or widowers and 644 individuals who are divorced.

As of 2000, there were 4,018 private households in the municipality, and an average of 2.2 persons per household. There were 1,488 households that consist of only one person and 197 households with five or more people. Out of a total of 4,079 households that answered this question, 36.5% were households made up of just one person and there were 10 adults who lived with their parents. Of the rest of the households, there are 1,142 married couples without children, 1,080 married couples with children There were 223 single parents with a child or children. There were 75 households that were made up of unrelated people and 61 households that were made up of some sort of institution or another collective housing.

In 2000 there were 609 single family homes (or 53.0% of the total) out of a total of 1,148 inhabited buildings. There were 404 multi-family buildings (35.2%), along with 81 multi-purpose buildings that were mostly used for housing (7.1%) and 54 other use buildings (commercial or industrial) that also had some housing (4.7%). Of the single family homes 25 were built before 1919, while 77 were built between 1990 and 2000. The greatest number of single family homes (191) were built between 1919 and 1945.

In 2000 there were 4,303 apartments in the municipality. The most common apartment size was 3 rooms of which there were 1,624. There were 134 single room apartments and 682 apartments with five or more rooms. Of these apartments, a total of 3,835 apartments (89.1% of the total) were permanently occupied, while 320 apartments (7.4%) were seasonally occupied and 148 apartments (3.4%) were empty. As of 2009, the construction rate of new housing units was 1 new units per 1000 residents. The vacancy rate for the municipality, in 2010, was 1.94%.

The historical population is given in the following chart:

== Politics ==
In the 2007 federal election the most popular party was the SP which received 27.1% of the vote. The next three most popular parties were the SVP (24.18%), the FDP (18.75%) and the CVP (16.09%). In the federal election, a total of 1,855 votes were cast, and the voter turnout was 40.3%. Municipality president is Stefan Hug.

== Economy ==
Zuchwil is an important site for industrial production and product development. Employers include Bosch (power tools), synthes (medical implants), Scherrer (coffeemakers) and Swissqual (test systems for cellular networks).

As of 2010, Zuchwil had an unemployment rate of 5.8%. As of 2008, there were 13 people employed in the primary economic sector and about 4 businesses involved in this sector. 1,817 people were employed in the secondary sector and there were 57 businesses in this sector. 2,445 people were employed in the tertiary sector, with 223 businesses in this sector. There were 4,746 residents of the municipality who were employed in some capacity, of which females made up 43.3% of the workforce.

In 2008 the total number of full-time equivalent jobs was 3,719. The number of jobs in the primary sector was 10, all of which were in agriculture. The number of jobs in the secondary sector was 1,741 of which 1,403 or (80.6%) were in manufacturing and 272 (15.6%) were in construction. The number of jobs in the tertiary sector was 1,968. In the tertiary sector; 751 or 38.2% were in wholesale or retail sales or the repair of motor vehicles, 72 or 3.7% were in the movement and storage of goods, 144 or 7.3% were in a hotel or restaurant, 90 or 4.6% were in the information industry, 106 or 5.4% were the insurance or financial industry, 51 or 2.6% were technical professionals or scientists, 81 or 4.1% were in education and 401 or 20.4% were in health care.

In 2000, there were 3,390 workers who commuted into the municipality and 3,430 workers who commuted away. The municipality is a net exporter of workers, with about 1.0 workers leaving the municipality for every one entering. Of the working population, 19.9% used public transportation to get to work, and 48% used a private car.

== Religion ==
From the 2000 census, 3,011 or 33.7% were Roman Catholic, while 2,379 or 26.7% belonged to the Swiss Reformed Church. Of the rest of the population, there were 403 members of an Orthodox church (or about 4.52% of the population), there were 52 individuals (or about 0.58% of the population) who belonged to the Christian Catholic Church, and there were 172 individuals (or about 1.93% of the population) who belonged to another Christian church. There were 2 individuals (or about 0.02% of the population) who were Jewish, and 919 (or about 10.30% of the population) who were Islamic. There were 58 individuals who were Buddhist, 223 individuals who were Hindu and 11 individuals who belonged to another church. 1,331 (or about 14.92% of the population) belonged to no church, are agnostic or atheist, and 361 individuals (or about 4.05% of the population) did not answer the question.

== Education ==
In Zuchwil about 3,137 or (35.2%) of the population have completed non-mandatory upper secondary education, and 785 or (8.8%) have completed additional higher education (either university or a Fachhochschule). Of the 785 who completed tertiary schooling, 62.5% were Swiss men, 20.6% were Swiss women, 12.0% were non-Swiss men and 4.8% were non-Swiss women.

During the 2010–2011 school year there were a total of 981 students in the Zuchwil school system. The education system in the Canton of Solothurn allows young children to attend two years of non-obligatory Kindergarten. During that school year, there were 165 children in kindergarten. The canton's school system requires students to attend six years of primary school, with some of the children attending smaller, specialized classes. In the municipality there were 528 students in primary school and 31 students in the special, smaller classes. The secondary school program consists of three lower, obligatory years of schooling, followed by three to five years of optional, advanced schools. 257 lower secondary students attend school in Zuchwil.

As of 2000, there were 25 students in Zuchwil who came from another municipality, while 232 residents attended schools outside the municipality.

Zuchwil is home to the Gemeindebibliothek Zuchwil (municipal library of Zuchwil). The library has (as of 2008) 10,427 books or other media, and loaned out 21,113 items in the same year. It was open a total of 160 days with average of 8 hours per week during that year.
