= Hersiwil =

- Former municipality
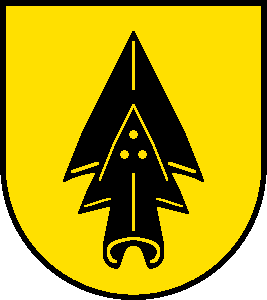
- Coat of arms
- Location of Hersiwil
- Location within Switzerland Location within Canton of Solothurn
- Coordinates: 47°10′N 7°38′E
- Country: Switzerland
- Canton: Solothurn
- District: Wasseramt

Area
  - Total: 1.43 km^{2} (0.55 sq mi)
- Elevation: 491 m (1,611 ft)

Population (Dec 2011)
  - Total: 190
  - Density: 130/km^{2} (340/sq mi)
- Time zone: UTC+01:00 (CET)
  - Summer (DST): UTC+02:00 (CEST)
- Postal code: 4558
- SFOS number: 2522
- ISO 3166 code: CH-SO
- Surrounded by: Aeschi, Etziken, Halten, Heinrichswil-Winistorf, Horriwil, Oekingen
- Website: SFSO statistics

Hersiwil is a former municipality in the district of Wasseramt in the canton of Solothurn in Switzerland. On 1 January 2013 the former municipalities of Heinrichswil-Winistorf and Hersiwil merged to form the new municipality of Drei Höfe.

== History ==
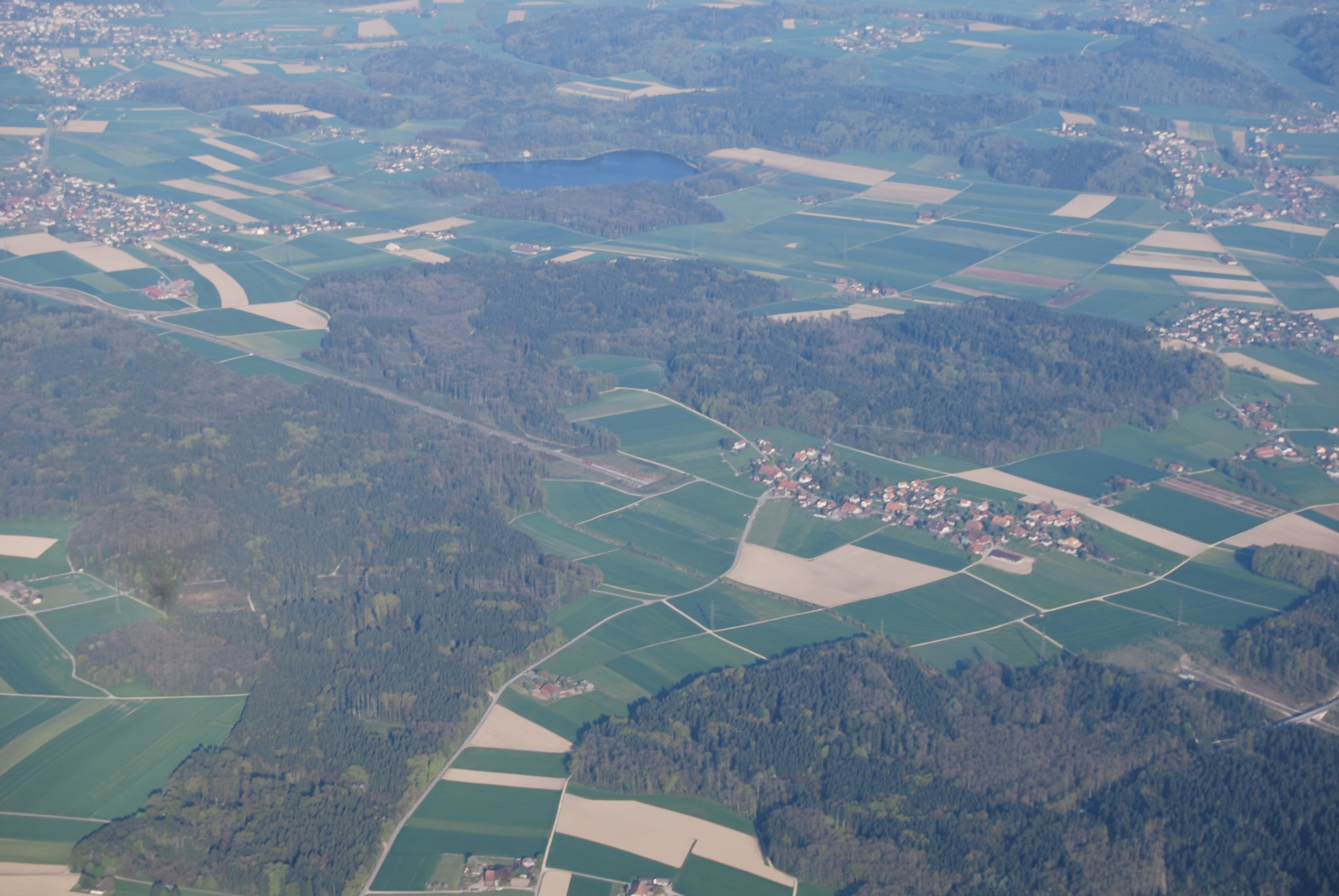
Aerial view of Hersiwil

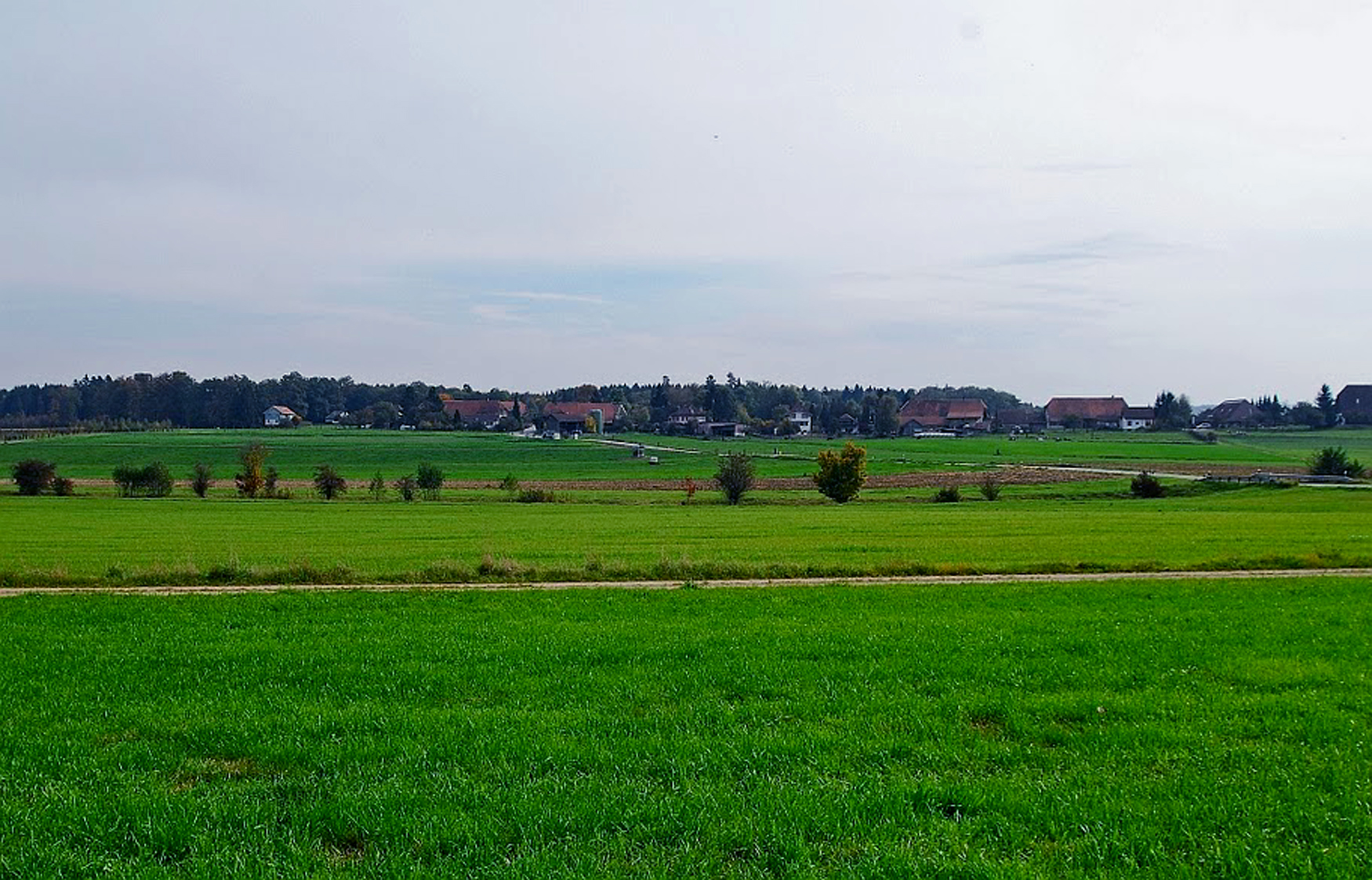
Hersiwil from a distance

Hersiwil is first mentioned in 1324 as Hersenwile. It formed a double municipality with Heinrichswil until 1798, when Winistorf joined the other two to form the triple municipality of Hersiwil-Heinrichswil-Winistorf. In 1854 it split into three, separate, independent municipalities. In 1993, Heinrichswil and Winistorf merged again, but Hersiwil remained independent.

== Geography ==
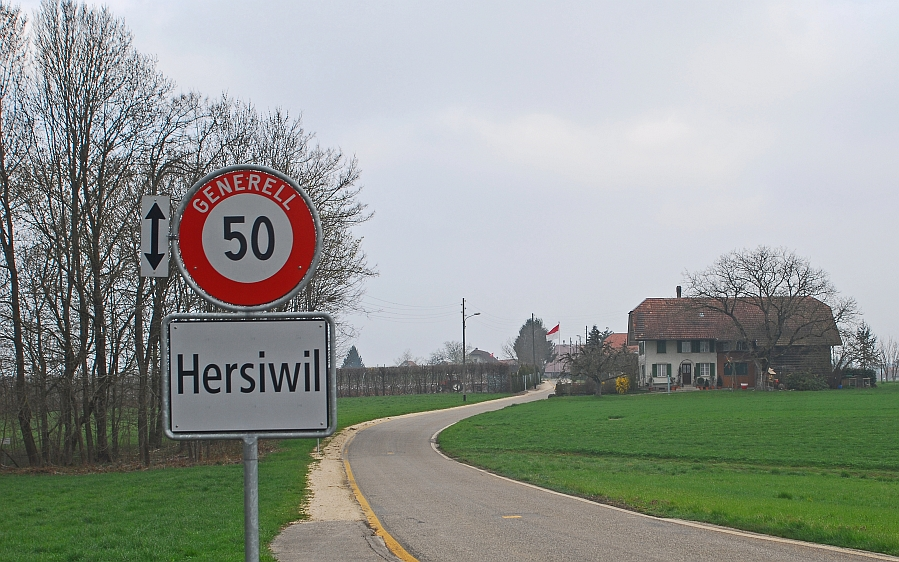
road sign, entrance to Hersiwil

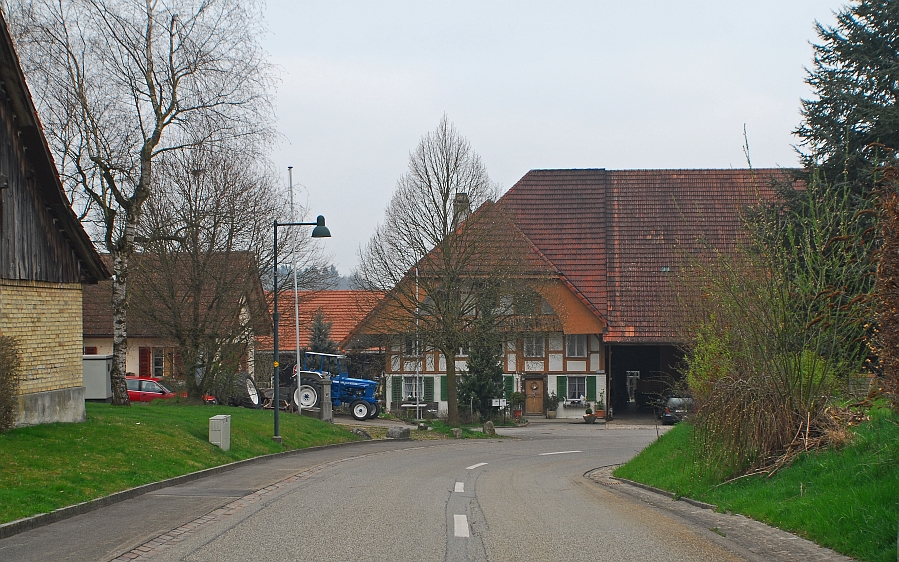
Main street in Hersiwil

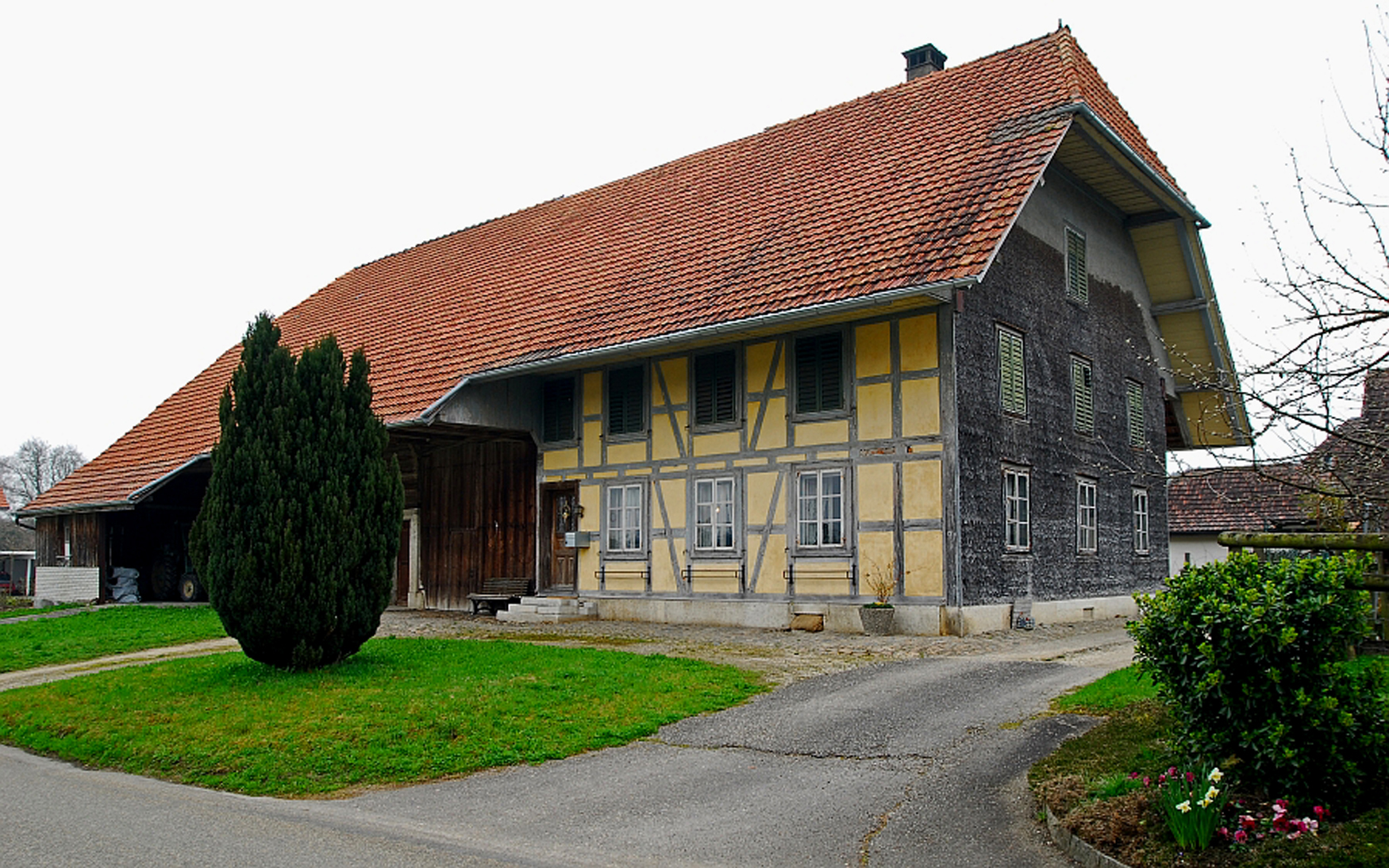
"Neuhaus" Hauptstrasse 36, Hersiwil, home of Jakob Gerber [1856-1935], mayor and district judge

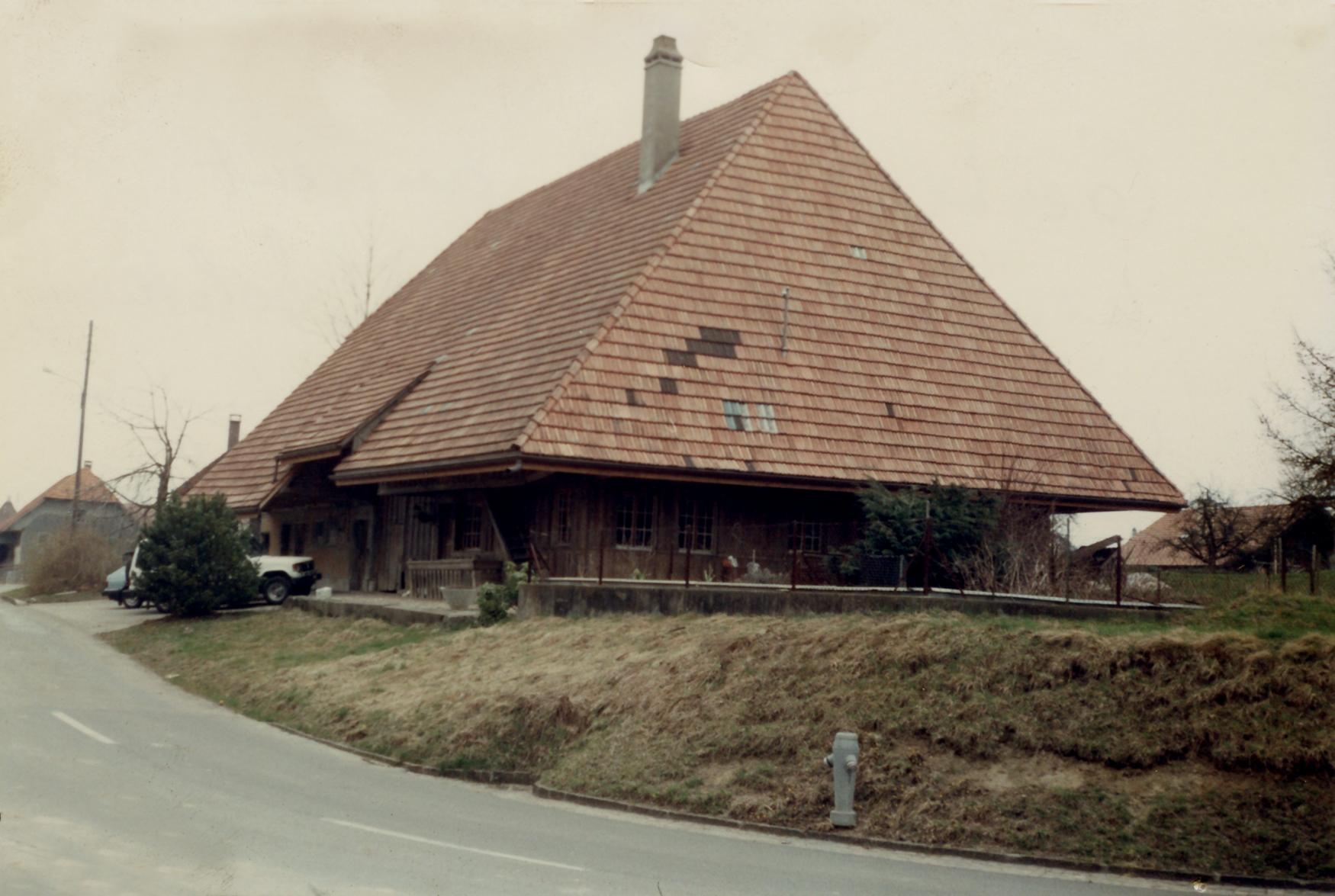
Hersiwil, typical old farmhouse, built in 1776, named "Gerber Haus"

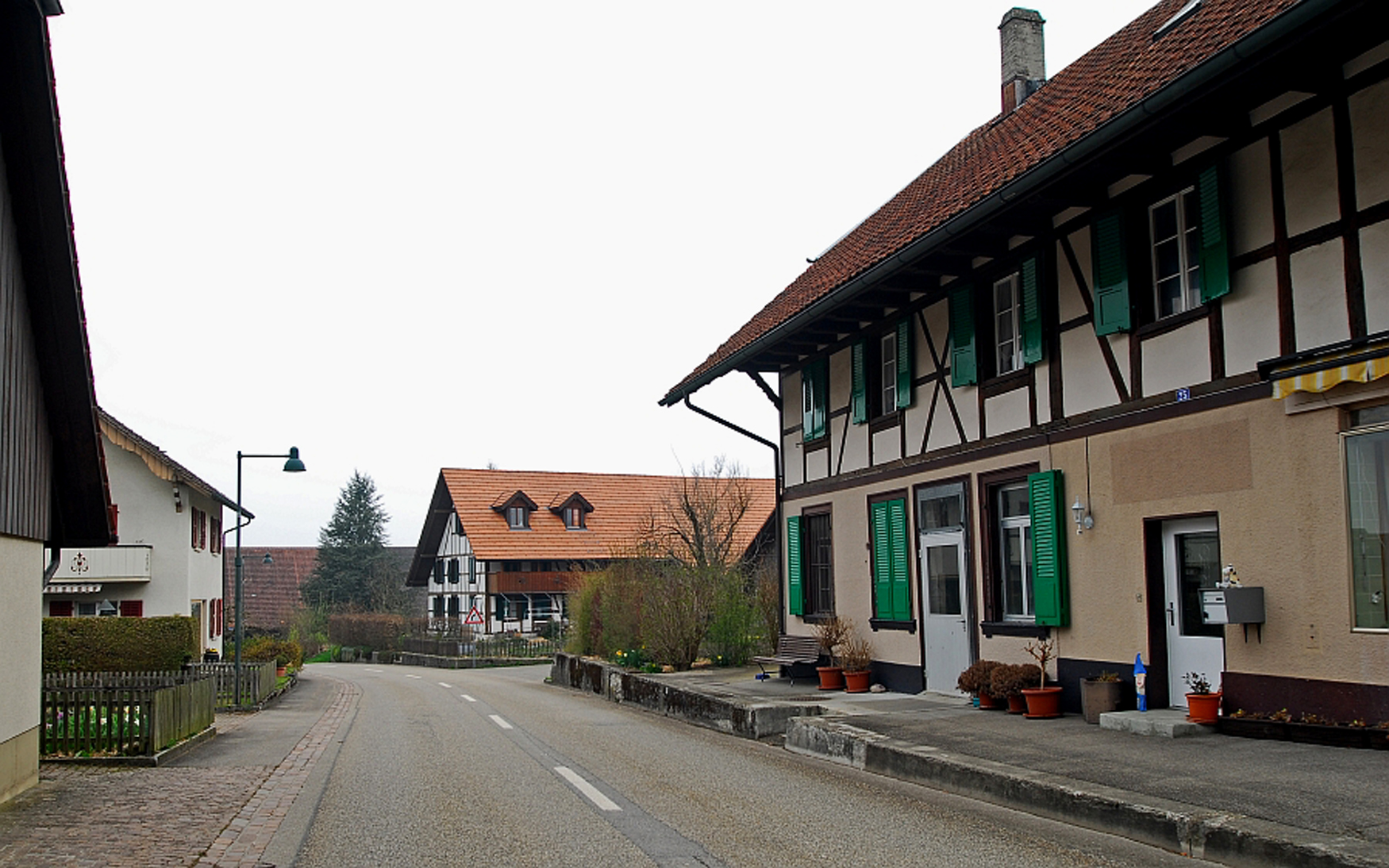
Hersiwil, Hauptstrasse

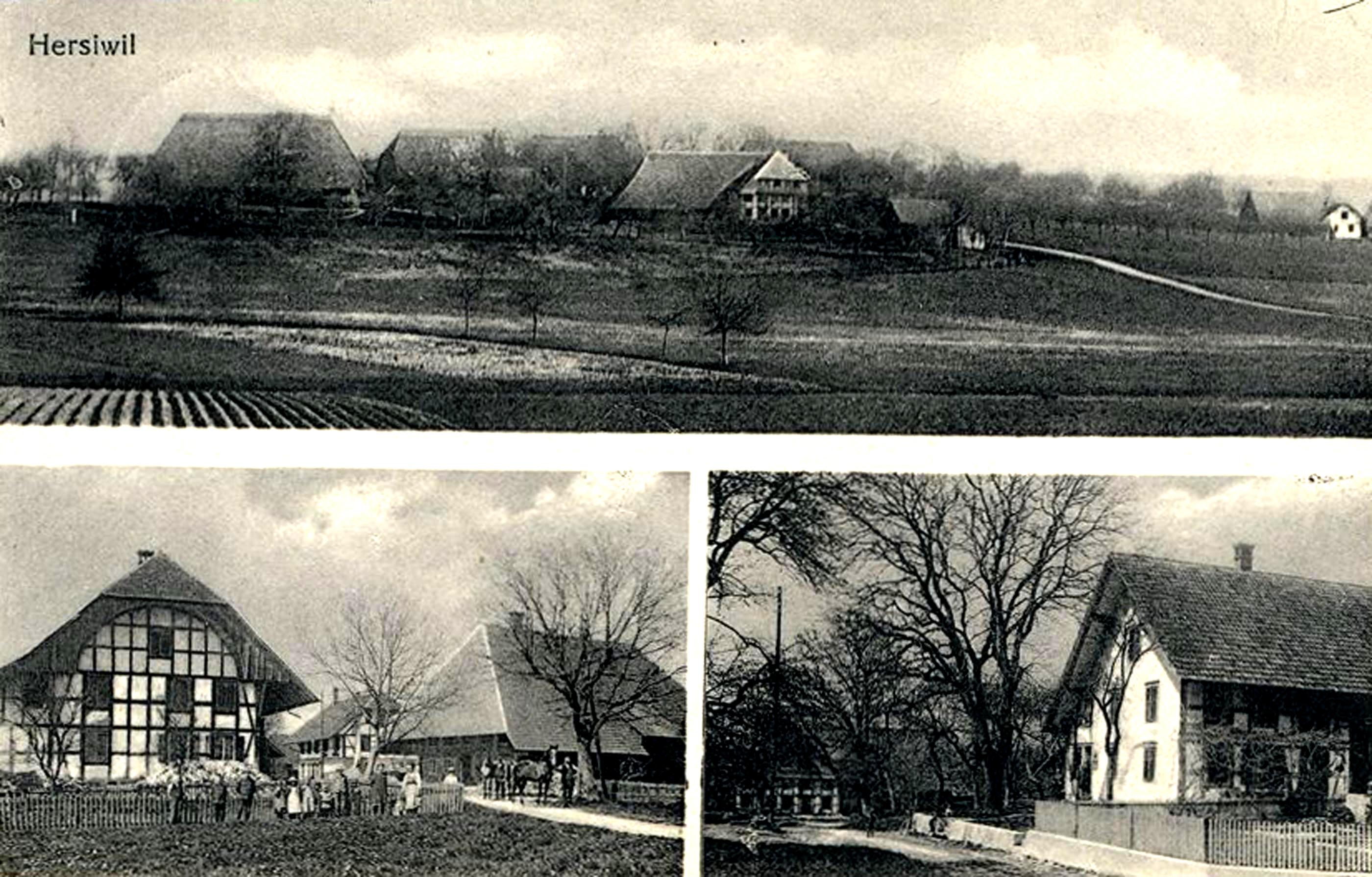
old postcard from Hersiwil, dated 1900

Hersiwil had an area, as of 2009, of 1.43 square kilometers (0.55 sq mi). Of this area, 0.97 km^{2} (0.37 sq mi) or 67.8% is used for agricultural purposes, while 0.32 km^{2} (0.12 sq mi) or 22.4% is forested. Of the rest of the land, 0.09 km^{2} (22 acres) or 6.3% is settled (buildings or roads), 0.02 km^{2} (4.9 acres) or 1.4% is either rivers or lakes and 0.01 km^{2} (2.5 acres) or 0.7% is unproductive land.

Of the built up area, housing and buildings made up 2.8% and transportation infrastructure made up 3.5%. Out of the forested land, all of the forested land area is covered with heavy forests. Of the agricultural land, 43.4% is used for growing crops and 21.0% is pastures, while 3.5% is used for orchards or vine crops. All the water in the municipality is flowing water.

The agricultural former municipality is located in the Wasseramt district.

== Coat of arms ==
The blazon of the municipal coat of arms is Or a Ploughshare doubled Sable.

== Demographics ==
Hersiwil has a population (as of 2011) of 190. As of 2008, 1.7% of the population are resident foreign nationals. Over the last 10 years (1999–2009 ) the population has changed at a rate of 7.1%. It has changed at a rate of 5.3% due to migration and at a rate of -2.4% due to births and deaths.

Most of the population (as of 2000) speaks German (167 or 99.4%) with the rest speaking Portuguese

As of 2008, the gender distribution of the population was 48.4% male and 51.6% female. The population was made up of 87 Swiss men (47.8% of the population) and 1 (0.5%) non-Swiss men. There were 93 Swiss women (51.1%) and 1 (0.5%) non-Swiss women. Of the population in the municipality 66 or about 39.3% were born in Hersiwil and lived there in 2000. There were 61 or 36.3% who were born in the same canton, while 34 or 20.2% were born somewhere else in Switzerland, and 4 or 2.4% were born outside of Switzerland.

In 2008 there was 1 live birth to Swiss citizens and were 2 deaths of Swiss citizens. Ignoring immigration and emigration, the population of Swiss citizens decreased by 1 while the foreign population remained the same. There was 1 Swiss woman who migrated back to Switzerland. At the same time, there was 1 non-Swiss woman who migrated from another country to Switzerland. The total Swiss population change in 2008 (from all sources, including moves across municipal borders) was an increase of 2 and the non-Swiss population increased by 1. This represents a population growth rate of 1.7%.

The age distribution, as of 2000, in Hersiwil is; 18 children or 10.7% of the population are between 0 and 6 years old and 31 teenagers or 18.5% are between 7 and 19. Of the adult population, 7 people or 4.2% of the population are between 20 and 24 years old. 58 people or 34.5% are between 25 and 44, and 30 people or 17.9% are between 45 and 64. The senior population distribution is 18 people or 10.7% of the population are between 65 and 79 years old and there are 6 people or 3.6% who are over 80.

As of 2000, there were 69 people who were single and never married in the municipality. There were 83 married people, 10 widows or widowers and 6 people who are divorced.

As of 2000, there were 61 private households in the municipality, and an average of 2.7 persons per household. There were 14 households that consist of only one person and 7 households with five or more people. Out of a total of 62 households that answered this question, 22.6% were households made up of just one person and there were 2 adults who lived with their parents. Of the rest of the households, there are 15 married couples without children, 27 married couples with children There were 2 single parents with a child or children. There was 1 household that was made up of unrelated people and 1 household that was made up of some sort of institution or another collective housing.

In 2000 there were 37 single family homes (or 66.1% of the total) out of a total of 56 inhabited buildings. There were 6 multi-family buildings (10.7%), along with 11 multi-purpose buildings that were mostly used for housing (19.6%) and 2 other use buildings (commercial or industrial) that also had some housing (3.6%). Of the single family homes 6 were built before 1919, while 10 were built between 1990 and 2000. The greatest number of single family homes (10) were built between 1991 and 1995.

In 2000 there were 66 apartments in the municipality. The most common apartment size was 5 rooms of which there were 15. There were no single room apartments and 36 apartments with five or more rooms. Of these apartments, a total of 61 apartments (92.4% of the total) were permanently occupied, while 2 apartments (3.0%) were seasonally occupied and 3 apartments (4.5%) were empty. As of 2010, the construction rate of new housing units was 0 new units per 1000 residents.

The historical population is given in the following chart:

== Politics ==
In the 2007 federal election the most popular party was the CVP which received 30.17% of the vote. The next three most popular parties were the FDP (20%), the SP (18.64%) and the Green Party (15.93%). In the federal election, a total of 86 votes were cast, and the voter turnout was 61.0%.

== Economy ==
As of 2008, Hersiwil had an unemployment rate of 8%. As of 2008, there were 11 people employed in the primary economic sector and about 4 businesses involved in this sector. 1 person was employed in the secondary sector and there was 1 business in this sector. 4 people were employed in the tertiary sector, with businesses in this sector. There were 86 residents of the municipality who were employed in some capacity, of which females made up 43.0% of the workforce.

In 2008 the total number of full-time equivalent jobs was 16. The number of jobs in the primary sector was 6, all of which were in agriculture. The number of jobs in the secondary sector was 9 of which 1 was in manufacturing and 8 were in construction. The number of jobs in the tertiary sector was 1, in the movement and storage of goods.

In 2000, there were 13 workers who commuted into the municipality and 66 workers who commuted away. The municipality is a net exporter of workers, with about 5.1 workers leaving the municipality for every one entering. Of the working population, 61.6% used public transportation to get to work, and 74.4% used a private car.

== Religion ==
From the 2000 census, 102 or 60.7% were Roman Catholic, while 52 or 31.0% belonged to the Swiss Reformed Church. 10 (or about 5.95% of the population) belonged to no church, are agnostic or atheist, and 4 individuals (or about 2.38% of the population) did not answer the question.

== Education ==
In Hersiwil about 80 or (47.6%) of the population have completed non-mandatory upper secondary education, and 16 or (9.5%) have completed additional higher education (either university or a Fachhochschule). Of the 16 who completed tertiary schooling, 81.3% were Swiss men, 12.5% were Swiss women.

As of 2000, there was one student in Hersiwil who came from another municipality, while 29 residents attended schools outside the municipality.
