= Heinrichswil-Winistorf =

- Former municipality
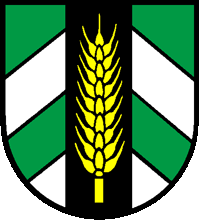
- Coat of arms
- Location of Heinrichswil-Winistorf
- Location within Switzerland Location within Canton of Solothurn
- Coordinates: 47°9′N 7°38′E
- Country: Switzerland
- Canton: Solothurn
- District: Wasseramt

Area
  - Total: 3.13 km^{2} (1.21 sq mi)
- Elevation: 475 m (1,558 ft)

Population (Dec 2011)
  - Total: 530
  - Density: 170/km^{2} (440/sq mi)
- Time zone: UTC+01:00 (CET)
  - Summer (DST): UTC+02:00 (CEST)
- Postal code: 4558
- SFOS number: 2521
- ISO 3166 code: CH-SO
- Surrounded by: Aeschi, Halten, Hellsau (BE), Hersiwil, Höchstetten (BE), Recherswil, Seeberg (BE), Willadingen (BE)
- Website: SFSO statistics

Heinrichswil-Winistorf is a former municipality in the district of Wasseramt in the canton of Solothurn in Switzerland. The municipality was formed from the 1993 union of Heinrichswil and Winistorf. On 1 January 2013 the former municipalities of Heinrichswil-Winistorf and Hersiwil merged to form the new municipality of Drei Höfe.

== History ==
Heinrichswil is first mentioned in 1317 as Cristan von Heinrichswile. It formed a double municipality with Heriswil until 1798, and until 1854 it was part of the triple municipality of Heinrichswil-Hersiwil-Winistorf.

== Geography ==
Heinrichswil-Winistorf had an area, as of 2009, of 3.13 square kilometers (1.21 sq mi). Of this area, 1.59 km^{2} (0.61 sq mi) or 50.8% is used for agricultural purposes, while 1.26 km^{2} (0.49 sq mi) or 40.3% is forested. Of the rest of the land, 0.25 km^{2} (0.097 sq mi) or 8.0% is settled (buildings or roads).

Of the built up area, housing and buildings made up 5.4% and transportation infrastructure made up 2.6%. Out of the forested land, all of the forested land area is covered with heavy forests. Of the agricultural land, 41.5% is used for growing crops and 6.1% is pastures, while 3.2% is used for orchards or vine crops.

The former municipality is located in the Wasseramt district, on a hill built up from a moraine on the road between Halten and Seeberg. It consists of the villages of Heinrichswil and Winistorf.

== Coat of arms ==
The blazon of the municipal coat of arms is Chevrony of four Vert and Argent overall on a Pale Sable a Corn Ear Or.

== Demographics ==
Heinrichswil-Winistorf had a population (as of 2011) of 530. As of 2008, 4.2% of the population are resident foreign nationals. Over the last 10 years (1999–2009 ) the population has changed at a rate of 6.3%. It has changed at a rate of 6.1% due to migration and at a rate of -0.6% due to births and deaths.

Most of the population (as of 2000) speaks German (516 or 97.7%), with Italian being second most common (2 or 0.4%) and English being third (2 or 0.4%). There is 1 person who speaks French.

As of 2008, the gender distribution of the population was 50.8% male and 49.2% female. The population was made up of 273 Swiss men (48.7% of the population) and 12 (2.1%) non-Swiss men. There were 266 Swiss women (47.4%) and 10 (1.8%) non-Swiss women. Of the population in the municipality 169 or about 32.0% were born in Heinrichswil-Winistorf and lived there in 2000. There were 146 or 27.7% who were born in the same canton, while 176 or 33.3% were born somewhere else in Switzerland, and 31 or 5.9% were born outside of Switzerland.

In 2008 there were 4 live births to Swiss citizens and were 6 deaths of Swiss citizens. Ignoring immigration and emigration, the population of Swiss citizens decreased by 2 while the foreign population remained the same. There were 2 Swiss women who immigrated back to Switzerland. At the same time, there was 1 non-Swiss man and 1 non-Swiss woman who immigrated from another country to Switzerland. The total Swiss population change in 2008 (from all sources, including moves across municipal borders) was an increase of 7 and the non-Swiss population increased by 7 people. This represents a population growth rate of 2.5%.

The age distribution, as of 2000, in Heinrichswil-Winistorf is; 34 children or 6.4% of the population are between 0 and 6 years old and 117 teenagers or 22.2% are between 7 and 19. Of the adult population, 16 people or 3.0% of the population are between 20 and 24 years old. 165 people or 31.3% are between 25 and 44, and 138 people or 26.1% are between 45 and 64. The senior population distribution is 44 people or 8.3% of the population are between 65 and 79 years old and there are 14 people or 2.7% who are over 80.

As of 2000, there were 215 people who were single and never married in the municipality. There were 269 married individuals, 22 widows or widowers and 22 individuals who are divorced.

As of 2000, there were 194 private households in the municipality, and an average of 2.7 persons per household. There were 33 households that consist of only one person and 21 households with five or more people. Out of a total of 196 households that answered this question, 16.8% were households made up of just one person. Of the rest of the households, there are 73 married couples without children, 77 married couples with children There were 9 single parents with a child or children. There were 2 households that were made up of unrelated people and 2 households that were made up of some sort of institution or another collective housing.

In 2000 there were 112 single family homes (or 74.2% of the total) out of a total of 151 inhabited buildings. There were 19 multi-family buildings (12.6%), along with 17 multi-purpose buildings that were mostly used for housing (11.3%) and 3 other use buildings (commercial or industrial) that also had some housing (2.0%). Of the single family homes 2 were built before 1919, while 24 were built between 1990 and 2000. The greatest number of single family homes (29) were built between 1971 and 1980.

In 2000 there were 185 apartments in the municipality. The most common apartment size was 5 rooms of which there were 66. There were 1 single room apartments and 107 apartments with five or more rooms. Of these apartments, a total of 178 apartments (96.2% of the total) were permanently occupied, while 4 apartments (2.2%) were seasonally occupied and 3 apartments (1.6%) were empty. As of 2009, the construction rate of new housing units was 5.3 new units per 1000 residents. The vacancy rate for the municipality, in 2010, was 0.97%.

The historical population is given in the following chart:

== Politics ==
In the 2007 federal election the most popular party was the CVP which received 29.18% of the vote. The next three most popular parties were the SVP (28.89%), the SP (15.96%) and the FDP (13.39%). In the federal election, a total of 255 votes were cast, and the voter turnout was 58.4%.

== Economy ==
As of 2010, Heinrichswil-Winistorf had an unemployment rate of 2.9%. As of 2008, there were 24 people employed in the primary economic sector and about 8 businesses involved in this sector. 7 people were employed in the secondary sector and there were 4 businesses in this sector. 23 people were employed in the tertiary sector, with 8 businesses in this sector. There were 278 residents of the municipality who were employed in some capacity, of which females made up 40.6% of the workforce.

In 2008 the total number of full-time equivalent jobs was 37. The number of jobs in the primary sector was 16, all of which were in agriculture. The number of jobs in the secondary sector was 5 of which 3 or (60.0%) were in manufacturing and 2 (40.0%) were in construction. The number of jobs in the tertiary sector was 16. In the tertiary sector; 1 was in the movement and storage of goods, 3 or 18.8% were in a hotel or restaurant, 1 was in the information industry, 3 or 18.8% were technical professionals or scientists, 6 or 37.5% were in education.

In 2000, there were 31 workers who commuted into the municipality and 221 workers who commuted away. The municipality is a net exporter of workers, with about 7.1 workers leaving the municipality for every one entering. Of the working population, 6.8% used public transportation to get to work, and 69.1% used a private car.

== Religion ==
From the 2000 census, 176 or 33.3% were Roman Catholic, while 243 or 46.0% belonged to the Swiss Reformed Church. Of the rest of the population, there was 1 member of an Orthodox church who belonged, there were 2 individuals (or about 0.38% of the population) who belonged to the Christian Catholic Church, and there were 14 individuals (or about 2.65% of the population) who belonged to another Christian church. There were 3 (or about 0.57% of the population) who were Islamic. 85 (or about 16.10% of the population) belonged to no church, are agnostic or atheist, and 3 individuals (or about 0.57% of the population) did not answer the question.

== Education ==
In Heinrichswil-Winistorf about 219 or (41.5%) of the population have completed non-mandatory upper secondary education, and 69 or (13.1%) have completed additional higher education (either university or a Fachhochschule). Of the 69 who completed tertiary schooling, 75.4% were Swiss men, 15.9% were Swiss women.

As of 2000, there were 16 students in Heinrichswil-Winistorf who came from another municipality, while 49 residents attended schools outside the municipality.
