= Derendingen, Switzerland =

Derendingen
- Municipality
- Coat of arms
- Location of Derendingen
- Location within Switzerland Location within Canton of Solothurn
- Coordinates: 47°12′N 7°35′E
- Country: Switzerland
- Canton: Solothurn
- District: Wasseramt

Area
  - Total: 5.62 km^{2} (2.17 sq mi)
- Elevation: 439 m (1,440 ft)

Population (December 2020)
  - Total: 6,592
  - Density: 1,170/km^{2} (3,040/sq mi)
- Time zone: UTC+01:00 (CET)
  - Summer (DST): UTC+02:00 (CEST)
- Postal code: 4552
- SFOS number: 2517
- ISO 3166 code: CH-SO
- Surrounded by: Biberist, Deitingen, Gerlafingen, Kriegstetten, Luterbach, Oekingen, Subingen, Zuchwil
- Website: www.derendingen.ch

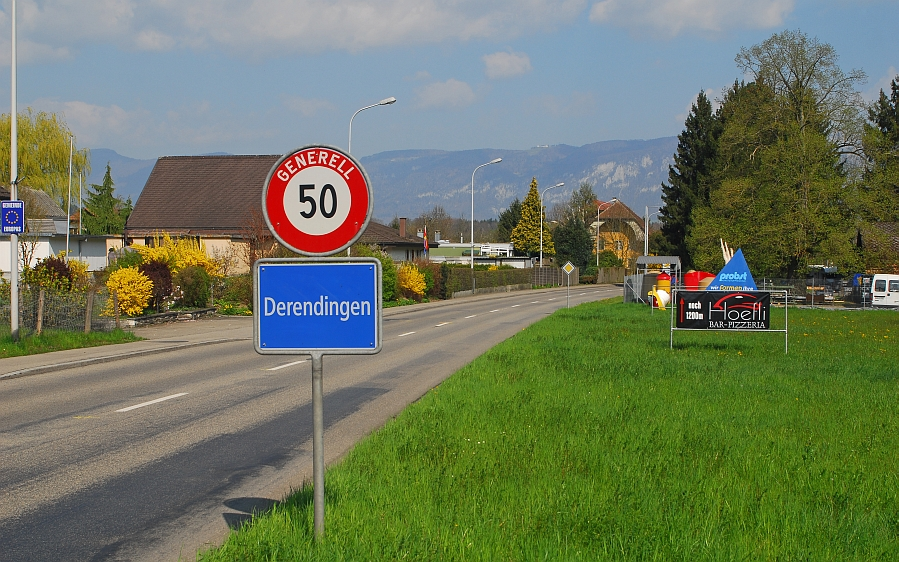
entrance to the village of Derendingen

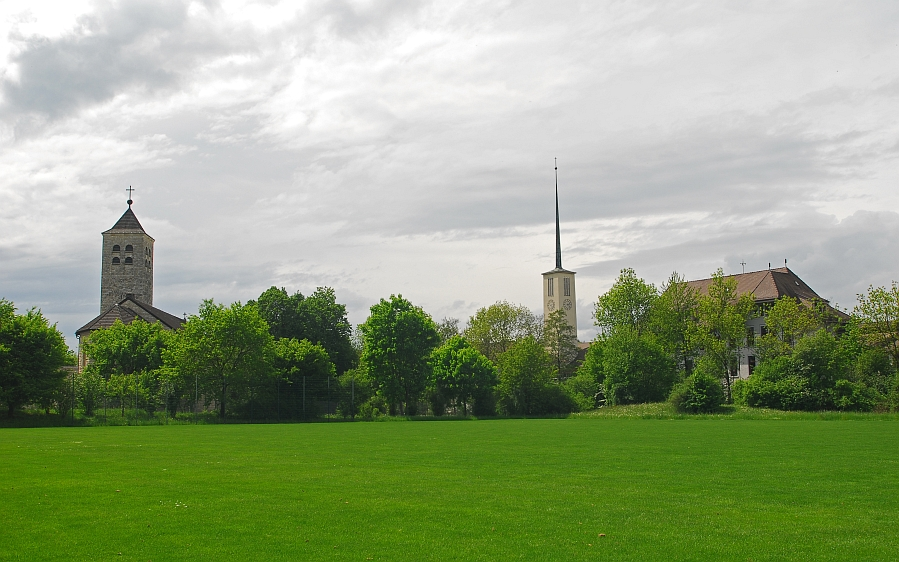
Roman Catholic and Evangelical Reformed Churches of Derendingen

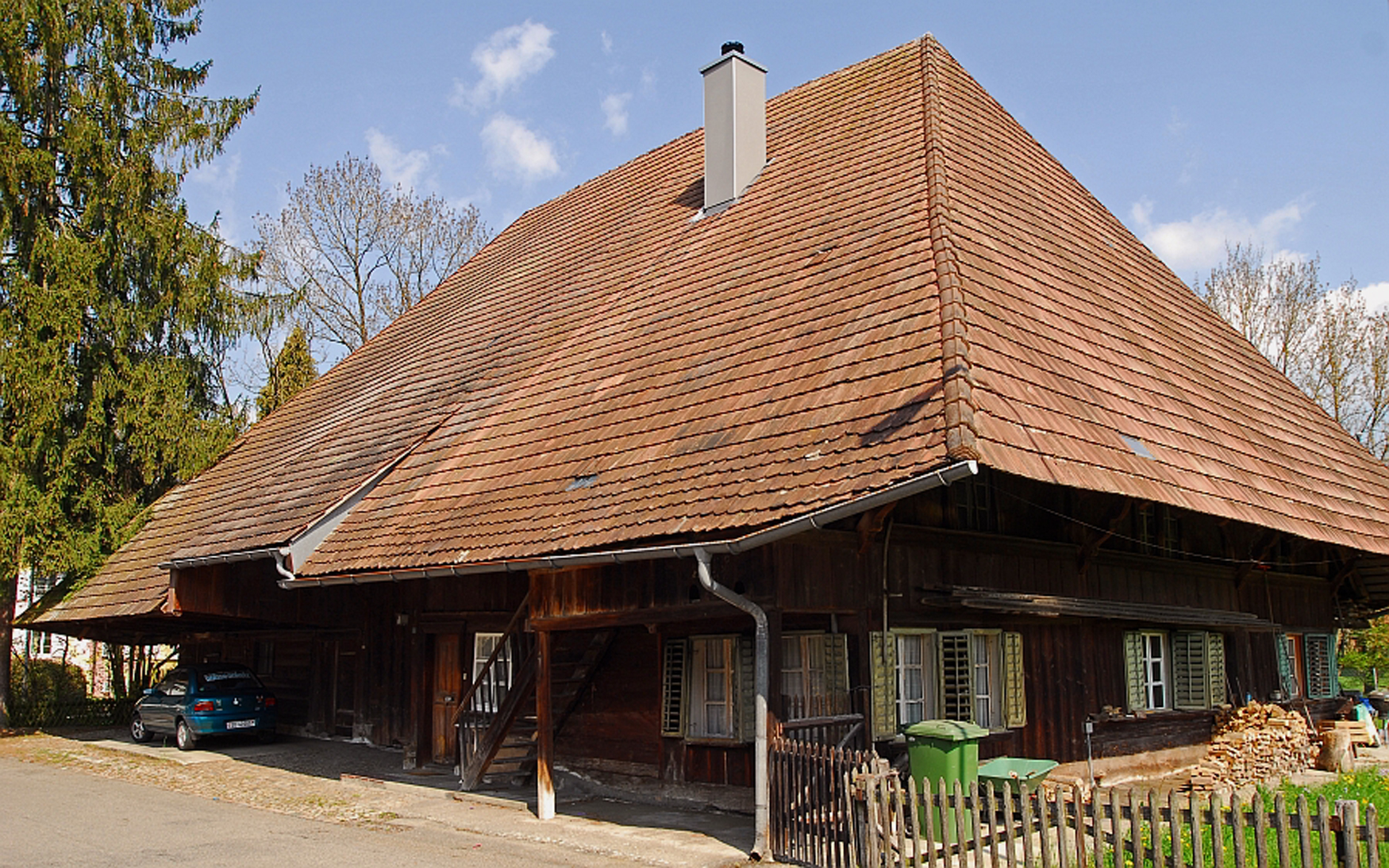
Derendingen SO - old allemannic-style farmhouse, called "Aebi Haus" or "Aebi Hütte"

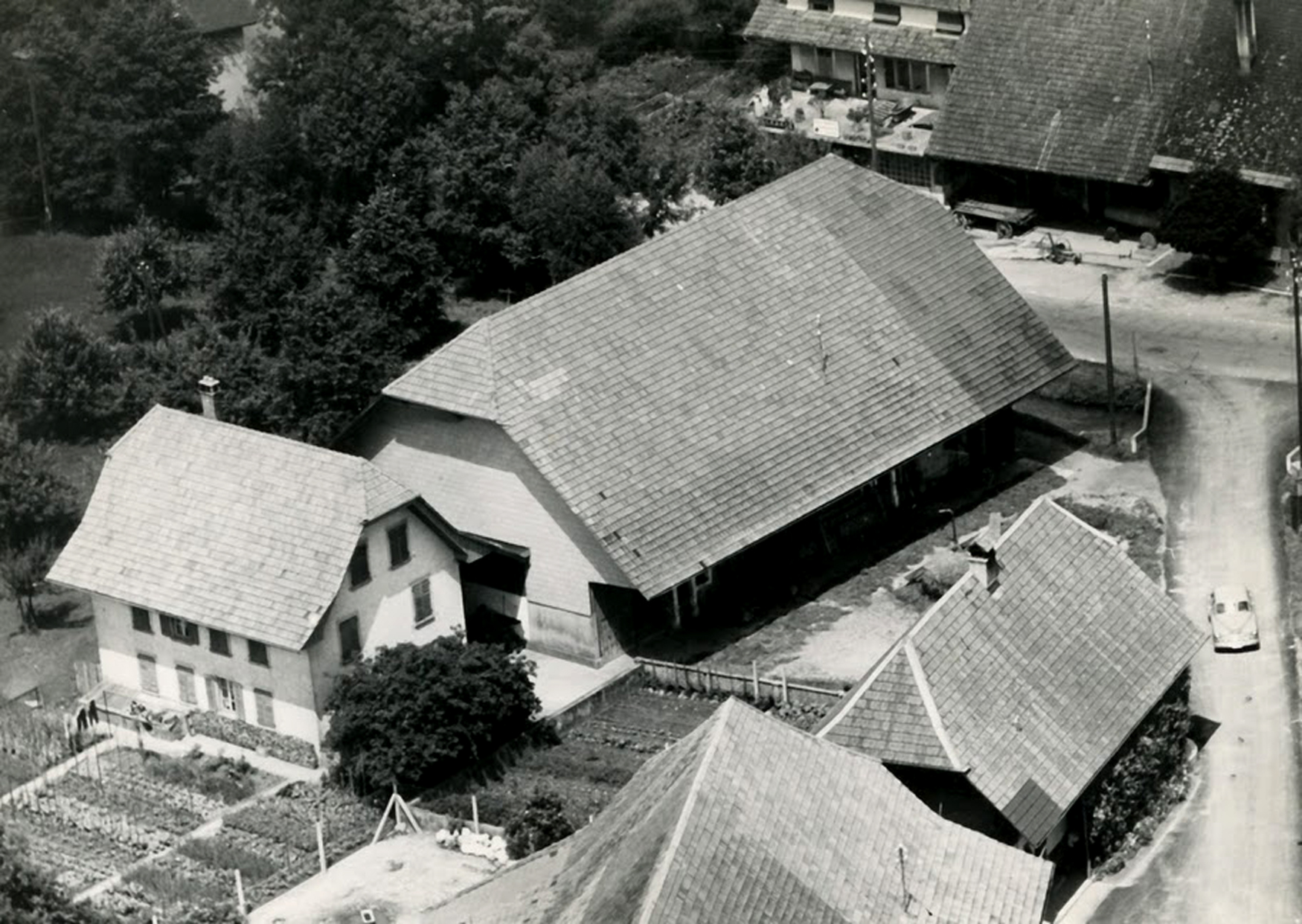
Derendingen SO, intersection No. 2 Biberiststrasse and Hauptstrasse, aerial photograph dated 1965

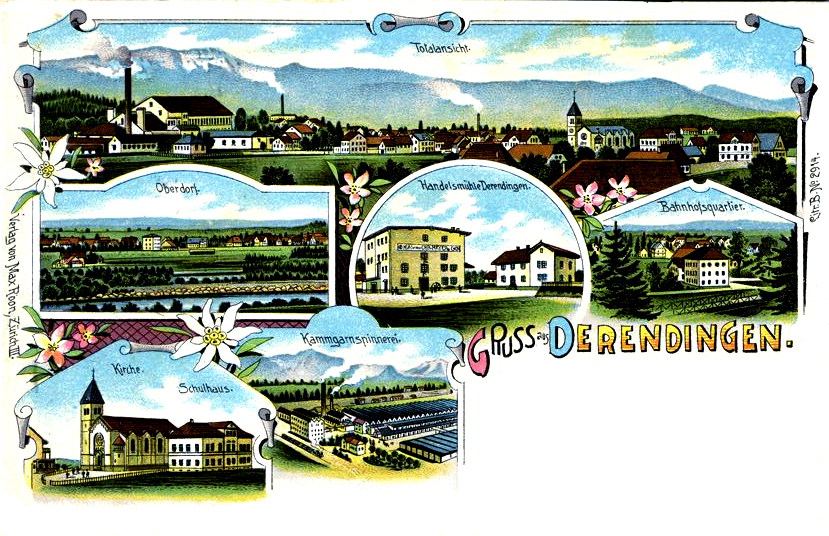
old postcard of Derendingen dated about 1920

Aerial view (1970)

Derendingen is a municipality in the district of Wasseramt in the canton of Solothurn in Switzerland.

== History ==
Derendingen is first mentioned in 1264 as Teradingen. Originally an agricultural community, it became a centre of textiles industry in the 1860s. The housing estate Elsässli is now a monument.

== Geography ==
Derendingen has an area, as of 2009, of 5.62 square kilometers (2.17 sq mi). Of this area, 2.2 km^{2} (0.85 sq mi) or 39.1% is used for agricultural purposes, while 1.5 km^{2} (0.58 sq mi) or 26.7% is forested. Of the rest of the land, 1.83 km^{2} (0.71 sq mi) or 32.6% is settled (buildings or roads), 0.08 km^{2} (20 acres) or 1.4% is either rivers or lakes.

Of the built up area, industrial buildings made up 3.4% of the total area while housing and buildings made up 18.7% and transportation infrastructure made up 7.8%. while parks, green belts and sports fields made up 2.1%. Out of the forested land, 24.7% of the total land area is heavily forested and 2.0% is covered with orchards or small clusters of trees. Of the agricultural land, 29.7% is used for growing crops and 8.0% is pastures, while 1.4% is used for orchards or vine crops. All the water in the municipality is flowing water.

The municipality is located in the Wasseramt district, on the lower reaches of the Emme river.

The municipalities of Biberist, Derendingen, Luterbach, Bellach, Langendorf and Solothurn are considering a merger at a date in the future into the new municipality of with an, as of 2011, undetermined name.

== Coat of arms ==
The blazon of the municipal coat of arms is Argent three bends Gules and overall a Fish naiant Azure.

== Demographics ==
Derendingen has a population (as of December 2020) of 6,592. As of 2008, 26.2% of the population are resident foreign nationals. Over the last 10 years (1999–2009) the population has changed at a rate of 3.8%. It has changed at a rate of 5.4% due to migration and at a rate of 0.8% due to births and deaths.

Most of the population (as of 2000) speaks German (4,942 or 85.1%), with Italian being second most common (346 or 6.0%) and Albanian being third (134 or 2.3%). There are 38 people who speak French and 1 person who speaks Romansh.

As of 2008, the gender distribution of the population was 49.6% male and 50.4% female. The population was made up of 2,098 Swiss men (34.3% of the population) and 930 (15.2%) non-Swiss men. There were 2,291 Swiss women (37.5%) and 790 (12.9%) non-Swiss women. Of the population in the municipality 1,589 or about 27.3% were born in Derendingen and lived there in 2000. There were 1,647 or 28.3% who were born in the same canton, while 1,272 or 21.9% were born somewhere else in Switzerland, and 1,094 or 18.8% were born outside of Switzerland.

In 2008 there were 40 live births to Swiss citizens and 25 births to non-Swiss citizens, and in same time span there were 50 deaths of Swiss citizens and 5 non-Swiss citizen deaths. Ignoring immigration and emigration, the population of Swiss citizens decreased by 10 while the foreign population increased by 20. There were 5 Swiss men who immigrated back to Switzerland. At the same time, there were 9 non-Swiss men and 11 non-Swiss women who immigrated from another country to Switzerland. The total Swiss population change in 2008 (from all sources, including moves across municipal borders) was a decrease of 8 and the non-Swiss population increased by 56 people. This represents a population growth rate of 0.8%.

The age distribution, as of 2000, in Derendingen is; 485 children or 8.3% of the population are between 0 and 6 years old and 957 teenagers or 16.5% are between 7 and 19. Of the adult population, 344 people or 5.9% of the population are between 20 and 24 years old. 1,808 people or 31.1% are between 25 and 44, and 1,408 people or 24.2% are between 45 and 64. The senior population distribution is 597 people or 10.3% of the population are between 65 and 79 years old and there are 211 people or 3.6% who are over 80.

As of 2000, there were 2,358 people who were single and never married in the municipality. There were 2,699 married individuals, 369 widows or widowers and 384 individuals who are divorced.

As of 2000, there were 2,453 private households in the municipality, and an average of 2.3 persons per household. There were 818 households that consist of only one person and 154 households with five or more people. Out of a total of 2,504 households that answered this question, 32.7% were households made up of just one person and there were 10 adults who lived with their parents. Of the rest of the households, there are 689 married couples without children, 748 married couples with children There were 164 single parents with a child or children. There were 24 households that were made up of unrelated people and 51 households that were made up of some sort of institution or another collective housing.

In 2000 there were 741 single family homes (or 59.2% of the total) out of a total of 1,251 inhabited buildings. There were 346 multi-family buildings (27.7%), along with 103 multi-purpose buildings that were mostly used for housing (8.2%) and 61 other use buildings (commercial or industrial) that also had some housing (4.9%). Of the single family homes 51 were built before 1919, while 162 were built between 1990 and 2000. The greatest number of single family homes (158) were built between 1946 and 1960.

In 2000 there were 2,627 apartments in the municipality. The most common apartment size was 4 rooms of which there were 920. There were 77 single room apartments and 682 apartments with five or more rooms. Of these apartments, a total of 2,375 apartments (90.4% of the total) were permanently occupied, while 135 apartments (5.1%) were seasonally occupied and 117 apartments (4.5%) were empty. As of 2009, the construction rate of new housing units was 5.8 new units per 1000 residents. The vacancy rate for the municipality, in 2010, was 4.15%.

The historical population is given in the following chart:

== Politics ==
In the 2007 federal election the most popular party was the SP which received 25.34% of the vote. The next three most popular parties were the SVP (25.02%), the FDP (20.64%) and the CVP (16.8%). In the federal election, a total of 1,686 votes were cast, and the voter turnout was 46.2%.

== Economy ==
As of 2010, Derendingen had an unemployment rate of 5.1%. As of 2008, there were 24 people employed in the primary economic sector and about 13 businesses involved in this sector. 675 people were employed in the secondary sector and there were 57 businesses in this sector. 1,012 people were employed in the tertiary sector, with 154 businesses in this sector. There were 3,101 residents of the municipality who were employed in some capacity, of which females made up 44.5% of the workforce.

In 2008 the total number of full-time equivalent jobs was 1,399. The number of jobs in the primary sector was 19, all of which were in agriculture. The number of jobs in the secondary sector was 613 of which 497 or (81.1%) were in manufacturing and 106 (17.3%) were in construction. The number of jobs in the tertiary sector was 767. In the tertiary sector; 208 or 27.1% were in wholesale or retail sales or the repair of motor vehicles, 128 or 16.7% were in the movement and storage of goods, 51 or 6.6% were in a hotel or restaurant, 15 or 2.0% were in the information industry, 26 or 3.4% were the insurance or financial industry, 43 or 5.6% were technical professionals or scientists, 79 or 10.3% were in education and 141 or 18.4% were in health care.

In 2000, there were 1,520 workers who commuted into the municipality and 2,321 workers who commuted away. The municipality is a net exporter of workers, with about 1.5 workers leaving the municipality for every one entering. Of the working population, 15.7% used public transportation to get to work, and 56.8% used a private car.

== Religion ==
From the 2000 census, 1,955 or 33.6% were Roman Catholic, while 2,041 or 35.1% belonged to the Swiss Reformed Church. Of the rest of the population, there were 78 members of an Orthodox church (or about 1.34% of the population), there were 19 individuals (or about 0.33% of the population) who belonged to the Christian Catholic Church, and there were 88 individuals (or about 1.51% of the population) who belonged to another Christian church. There were 2 individuals (or about 0.03% of the population) who were Jewish, and 469 (or about 8.07% of the population) who were Islamic. There were 3 individuals who were Buddhist, 11 individuals who were Hindu and 7 individuals who belonged to another church. 950 (or about 16.35% of the population) belonged to no church, are agnostic or atheist, and 187 individuals (or about 3.22% of the population) did not answer the question.

== Education ==
In Derendingen about 2,138 or (36.8%) of the population have completed non-mandatory upper secondary education, and 556 or (9.6%) have completed additional higher education (either university or a Fachhochschule). Of the 556 who completed tertiary schooling, 68.7% were Swiss men, 18.9% were Swiss women, 9.9% were non-Swiss men and 2.5% were non-Swiss women.

During the 2010–2011 school year there were a total of 558 students in the Derendingen school system. The education system in the Canton of Solothurn allows young children to attend two years of non-obligatory Kindergarten. During that school year, there were 114 children in kindergarten. The canton's school system requires students to attend six years of primary school, with some of the children attending smaller, specialized classes. In the municipality there were 444 students in primary school. The secondary school program consists of three lower, obligatory years of schooling, followed by three to five years of optional, advanced schools. All the lower secondary students from Derendingen attend their school in a neighboring municipality.

As of 2000, there were 320 students in Derendingen who came from another municipality, while 138 residents attended schools outside the municipality.
