= Aeschi =

- Municipality
- Coat of arms
- Location of Aeschi
- Location within Switzerland Location within Canton of Solothurn
- Coordinates: 47°11′N 7°40′E
- Country: Switzerland
- Canton: Solothurn
- District: Wasseramt

Area
  - Total: 3.80 km^{2} (1.47 sq mi)
- Elevation: 500 m (1,600 ft)

Population (December 2020)
  - Total: 1,268
  - Density: 334/km^{2} (864/sq mi)
- Time zone: UTC+01:00 (CET)
  - Summer (DST): UTC+02:00 (CEST)
- Postal code: 4556
- SFOS number: 2511
- ISO 3166 code: CH-SO
- Localities: Burgäschi, Aeschi
- Surrounded by: Bolken, Etziken, Heinrichswil-Winistorf, Hersiwil, Niederönz (BE), Oberönz (BE), Seeberg (BE)
- Website: www.aeschi-so.ch

Aeschi is a municipality in the district of Wasseramt in the canton of Solothurn in Switzerland. Burgäschisee is a lake in the forest on the border with Seeberg.

== Geography ==
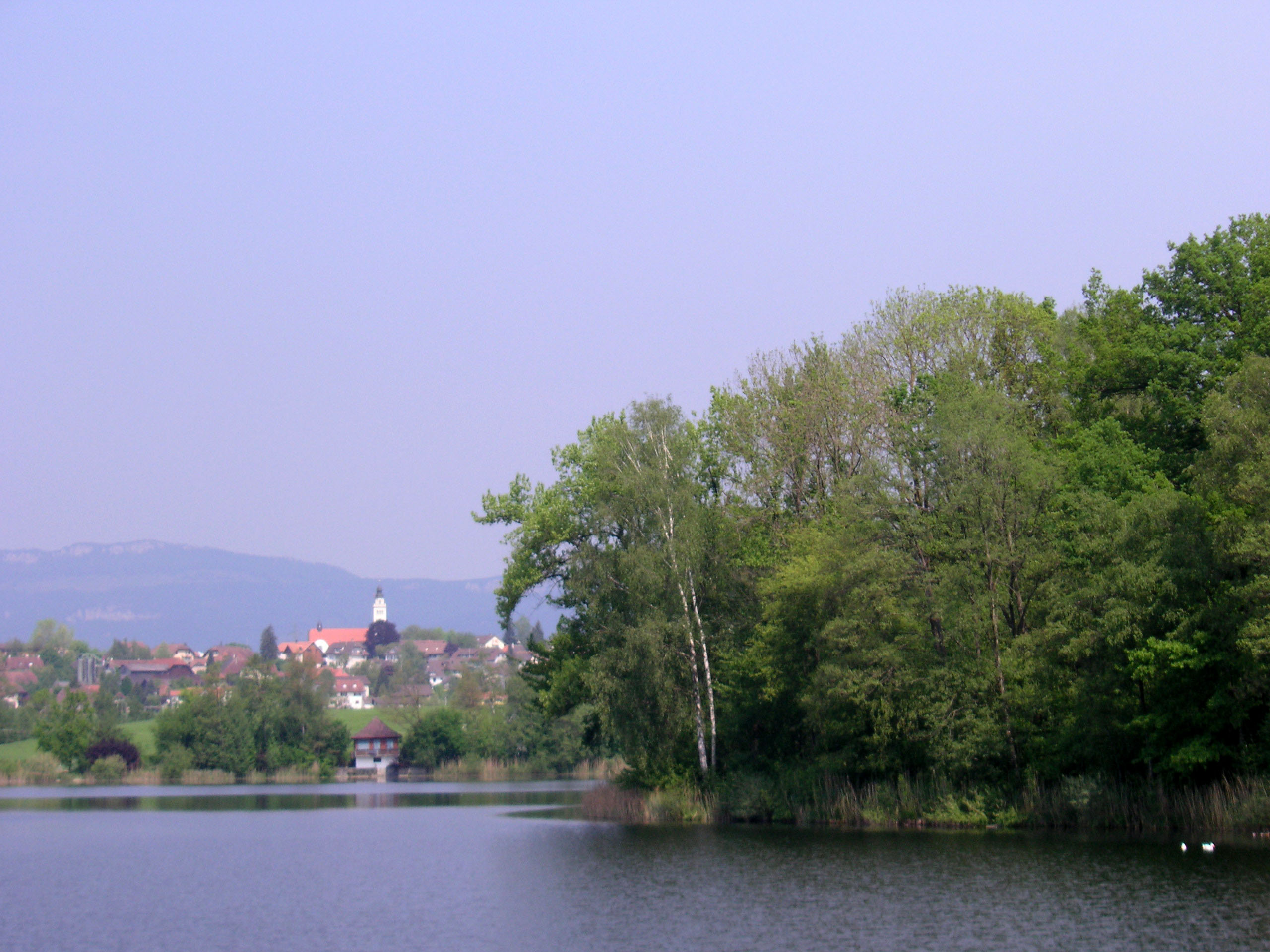
Aeschi and its lake

Aerial view by Walter Mittelholzer (1926)

Aeschi has an area, as of 2009, of 3.8 square kilometers (1.5 sq mi). Of this area, 2.4 km^{2} (0.93 sq mi) or 63.2% is used for agricultural purposes, while 0.66 km^{2} (0.25 sq mi) or 17.4% is forested. Of the rest of the land, 0.55 km^{2} (0.21 sq mi) or 14.5% is settled (buildings or roads), 0.16 km^{2} (0.062 sq mi) or 4.2% is either rivers or lakes and 0.04 km^{2} (9.9 acres) or 1.1% is unproductive land. After the 2012 merger, the area increased to 5.4 square kilometers (2.1 sq mi).

Of the built up area, housing and buildings made up 8.7% and transportation infrastructure made up 3.9%. while parks, green belts and sports fields made up 1.1%. Out of the forested land, all of the forested land area is covered with heavy forests. Of the agricultural land, 47.9% is used for growing crops and 13.4% is pastures, while 1.8% is used for orchards or vine crops. All the water in the municipality is in lakes.

The municipality is located in the Wasseramt district, in the upper moraine landscape along the Solothurn-Herzogenbuchsee main road. It consists of the village of Aeschi as well as, the hamlet of Burgäschi. Burgäschi was part of Aeschi until 1829 and after 1994. The municipality of Steinhof merged on 1 January 2012 into the municipality of Aeschi.

== Coat of arms ==
The blazon of the municipal coat of arms is Gules an Anchored Cross Sable over an Angle plate Or between four Mullets of the last over a Mount of 3 Coupeaux Vert.

== Demographics ==
Aeschi has a population (as of December 2020) of 1,268. As of 2008, 4.1% of the population are resident foreign nationals. Over the last 10 years (1999–2009 ) the population has changed at a rate of -3.5%. It has changed at a rate of -2.1% due to migration and at a rate of -0.7% due to births and deaths.

Most of the population (as of 2000) speaks German (975 or 96.1%), with Albanian being second most common (22 or 2.2%) and Italian being third (5 or 0.5%). There is 1 person who speaks French.

As of 2008, the gender distribution of the population was 52.0% male and 48.0% female. The population was made up of 492 Swiss men (48.5% of the population) and 36 (3.5%) non-Swiss men. There were 464 Swiss women (45.7%) and 23 (2.3%) non-Swiss women. Of the population in the municipality 364 or about 35.9% were born in Aeschi and lived there in 2000. There were 197 or 19.4% who were born in the same canton, while 343 or 33.8% were born somewhere else in Switzerland, and 86 or 8.5% were born outside of Switzerland.

In 2008 there were 8 live births to Swiss citizens and 1 birth to non-Swiss citizens, and in same time span there were 5 deaths of Swiss citizens. Ignoring immigration and emigration, the population of Swiss citizens increased by 3 while the foreign population increased by 1. There was 1 Swiss man and 1 Swiss woman who emigrated from Switzerland. The total Swiss population change in 2008 (from all sources, including moves across municipal borders) was a decrease of 11 and the non-Swiss population decreased by 5 people. This represents a population growth rate of -1.6%.

The age distribution, as of 2000, in Aeschi is; 70 children or 6.9% of the population are between 0 and 6 years old and 198 teenagers or 19.5% are between 7 and 19. Of the adult population, 57 people or 5.6% of the population are between 20 and 24 years old. 309 people or 30.4% are between 25 and 44, and 250 people or 24.6% are between 45 and 64. The senior population distribution is 114 people or 11.2% of the population are between 65 and 79 years old and there are 17 people or 1.7% who are over 80.

As of 2000, there were 422 people who were single and never married in the municipality. There were 511 married individuals, 41 widows or widowers and 41 individuals who are divorced.

As of 2000, there were 390 private households in the municipality, and an average of 2.6 persons per household. There were 95 households that consist of only one person and 25 households with five or more people. Out of a total of 397 households that answered this question, 23.9% were households made up of just one person and there were 2 adults who lived with their parents. Of the rest of the households, there are 107 married couples without children, 162 married couples with children There were 19 single parents with a child or children. There were 5 households that were made up of unrelated people and 7 households that were made up of some sort of institution or another collective housing.

In 2000 there were 194 single family homes (or 70.5% of the total) out of a total of 275 inhabited buildings. There were 39 multi-family buildings (14.2%), along with 33 multi-purpose buildings that were mostly used for housing (12.0%) and 9 other use buildings (commercial or industrial) that also had some housing (3.3%). Of the single family homes 13 were built before 1919, while 30 were built between 1990 and 2000. The greatest number of single family homes (51) were built between 1971 and 1980.

In 2000 there were 404 apartments in the municipality. The most common apartment size was 4 rooms of which there were 116. There were 4 single room apartments and 179 apartments with five or more rooms. Of these apartments, a total of 373 apartments (92.3% of the total) were permanently occupied, while 11 apartments (2.7%) were seasonally occupied and 20 apartments (5.0%) were empty. As of 2009, the construction rate of new housing units was 8 new units per 1000 residents. The vacancy rate for the municipality, in 2010, was 1.97%.

The historical population is given in the following chart:

== Heritage sites of national significance ==
The Burgäschisee, a prehistoric lake shore settlement, is listed as a Swiss heritage site of national significance. The settlement at Burgäschisee Ost is part of the Prehistoric Pile dwellings around the Alps a UNESCO World Heritage Site.

== Politics ==
In the 2007 federal election the most popular party was the SP which received 24.86% of the vote. The next three most popular parties were the CVP (23.04%), the SVP (21.4%) and the FDP (20%). In the federal election, a total of 410 votes were cast, and the voter turnout was 50.7%.

== Economy ==
As of 2010, Aeschi had an unemployment rate of 1.8%. As of 2008, there were 43 people employed in the primary economic sector and about 14 businesses involved in this sector. 41 people were employed in the secondary sector and there were 7 businesses in this sector. 60 people were employed in the tertiary sector, with 19 businesses in this sector. There were 552 residents of the municipality who were employed in some capacity, of which females made up 41.1% of the workforce.

In 2008 the total number of full-time equivalent jobs was 118. The number of jobs in the primary sector was 33, all of which were in agriculture. The number of jobs in the secondary sector was 40 of which 4 or (10.0%) were in manufacturing and 33 (82.5%) were in construction. The number of jobs in the tertiary sector was 45. In the tertiary sector; 14 or 31.1% were in wholesale or retail sales or the repair of motor vehicles, 5 or 11.1% were in the movement and storage of goods, 9 or 20.0% were in a hotel or restaurant, 2 or 4.4% were in the information industry, 6 or 13.3% were the insurance or financial industry, 2 or 4.4% were technical professionals or scientists, 5 or 11.1% were in education.

In 2000, there were 65 workers who commuted into the municipality and 411 workers who commuted away. The municipality is a net exporter of workers, with about 6.3 workers leaving the municipality for every one entering. Of the working population, 16.8% used public transportation to get to work, and 59.8% used a private car.

== Religion ==
From the 2000 census, 409 or 40.3% were Roman Catholic, while 421 or 41.5% belonged to the Swiss Reformed Church. Of the rest of the population, there were 2 members of an Orthodox church (or about 0.20% of the population), there were 5 individuals (or about 0.49% of the population) who belonged to the Christian Catholic Church, and there were 7 individuals (or about 0.69% of the population) who belonged to another Christian church. There were 51 (or about 5.02% of the population) who were Islamic. There were 2 individuals who were Buddhist and 4 individuals who were Hindu. 101 (or about 9.95% of the population) belonged to no church, are agnostic or atheist, and 13 individuals (or about 1.28% of the population) did not answer the question.

== Education ==
In Aeschi about 429 or (42.3%) of the population have completed non-mandatory upper secondary education, and 138 or (13.6%) have completed additional higher education (either university or a Fachhochschule). Of the 138 who completed tertiary schooling, 76.8% were Swiss men, 18.8% were Swiss women, 3.6% were non-Swiss men.

As of 2000, there were 26 students in Aeschi who came from another municipality, while 70 residents attended schools outside the municipality.
