= Halten =

- Municipality
- Coat of arms
- Location of Halten
- Location within Switzerland Location within Canton of Solothurn
- Coordinates: 47°10′N 7°36′E
- Country: Switzerland
- Canton: Solothurn
- District: Wasseramt

Area
  - Total: 1.83 km^{2} (0.71 sq mi)
- Elevation: 465 m (1,526 ft)

Population (December 2020)
  - Total: 850
  - Density: 460/km^{2} (1,200/sq mi)
- Time zone: UTC+01:00 (CET)
  - Summer (DST): UTC+02:00 (CEST)
- Postal code: 4566
- SFOS number: 2520
- ISO 3166 code: CH-SO
- Surrounded by: Heinrichswil-Winistorf, Hersiwil, Kriegstetten, Oekingen, Recherswil
- Website: www.halten.ch

Halten is a village and a former municipality in the district of Wasseramt in the canton of Solothurn in Switzerland. On 1 January 2026 it was merged into the municipality of Kriegstetten.

== History ==
Halten is first mentioned in 1201 as Haltun. In 1274 it was mentioned as Halton.

== Geography ==
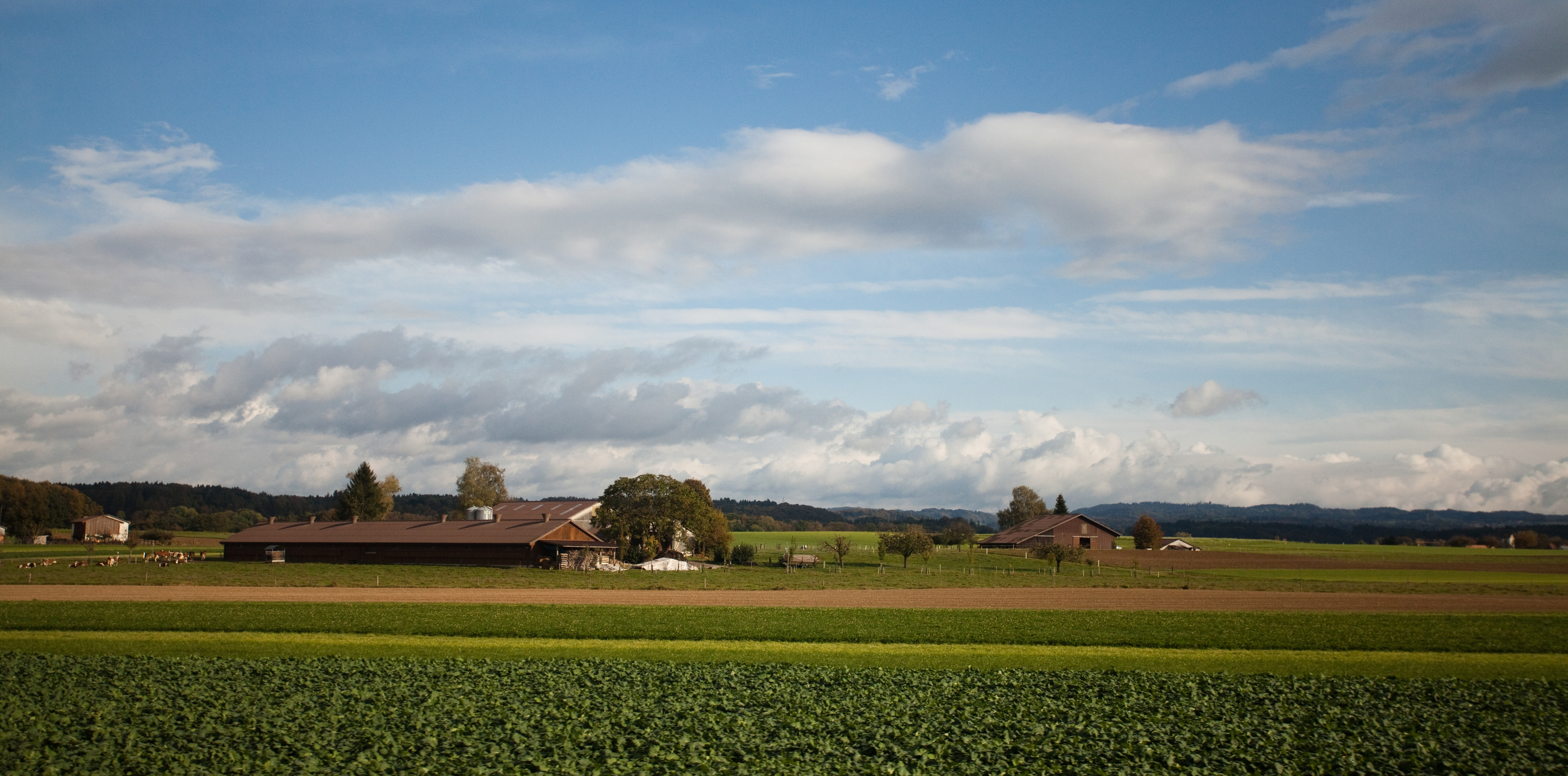
Fields near Halten

Aerial view (1970)

Halten has an area, as of 2009, of 1.83 square kilometers (0.71 sq mi). Of this area, 1.12 km^{2} (0.43 sq mi) or 61.2% is used for agricultural purposes, while 0.39 km^{2} (0.15 sq mi) or 21.3% is forested. Of the rest of the land, 0.34 km^{2} (0.13 sq mi) or 18.6% is settled (buildings or roads).

Of the built up area, housing and buildings made up 13.1% and transportation infrastructure made up 4.4%. while parks, green belts and sports fields made up 1.1%. Out of the forested land, 20.2% of the total land area is heavily forested and 1.1% is covered with orchards or small clusters of trees. Of the agricultural land, 47.5% is used for growing crops and 12.6% is pastures, while 1.1% is used for orchards or vine crops.

The municipality is located in the Wasseramt district.

== Coat of arms ==
The blazon of the municipal coat of arms is Per pale bendy sinister Gules and Argent and Sable a Tower roofed Argent.

== Demographics ==
Halten has a population (as of December 2020) of 850. As of 2008, 5.2% of the population are resident foreign nationals. Over the last 10 years (1999–2009 ) the population has changed at a rate of 4.4%. It has changed at a rate of 1.8% due to migration and at a rate of 2.1% due to births and deaths. Most of the population (as of 2000) speaks German (766 or 96.8%), with French being second most common (10 or 1.3%) and Italian being third (3 or 0.4%).

As of 2008, the gender distribution of the population was 49.3% male and 50.7% female. The population was made up of 379 Swiss men (45.8% of the population) and 29 (3.5%) non-Swiss men. There were 400 Swiss women (48.4%) and 19 (2.3%) non-Swiss women. Of the population in the municipality 204 or about 25.8% were born in Halten and lived there in 2000. There were 307 or 38.8% who were born in the same canton, while 199 or 25.2% were born somewhere else in Switzerland, and 57 or 7.2% were born outside of Switzerland.

In 2008 there were 6 live births to Swiss citizens and were 5 deaths of Swiss citizens and 1 non-Swiss citizen death. Ignoring immigration and emigration, the population of Swiss citizens increased by 1 while the foreign population decreased by 1. There were 2 Swiss men who emigrated from Switzerland and 1 Swiss woman who immigrated back to Switzerland. At the same time, there were 2 non-Swiss men and 1 non-Swiss woman who immigrated from another country to Switzerland. The total Swiss population change in 2008 (from all sources, including moves across municipal borders) was a decrease of 2 and the non-Swiss population increased by 9 people. This represents a population growth rate of 0.9%.

The age distribution, as of 2000, in Halten is; 54 children or 6.8% of the population are between 0 and 6 years old and 146 teenagers or 18.5% are between 7 and 19. Of the adult population, 42 people or 5.3% of the population are between 20 and 24 years old. 243 people or 30.7% are between 25 and 44, and 221 people or 27.9% are between 45 and 64. The senior population distribution is 67 people or 8.5% of the population are between 65 and 79 years old and there are 18 people or 2.3% who are over 80.

As of 2000, there were 311 people who were single and never married in the municipality. There were 425 married individuals, 30 widows or widowers and 25 individuals who are divorced.

As of 2000, there were 306 private households in the municipality, and an average of 2.6 persons per household. There were 59 households that consist of only one person and 27 households with five or more people. Out of a total of 307 households that answered this question, 19.2% were households made up of just one person and there were 3 adults who lived with their parents. Of the rest of the households, there are 112 married couples without children, 116 married couples with children There were 14 single parents with a child or children. There were 2 households that were made up of unrelated people and 1 household that was made up of some sort of institution or another collective housing.

In 2000 there were 178 single family homes (or 73.9% of the total) out of a total of 241 inhabited buildings. There were 37 multi-family buildings (15.4%), along with 21 multi-purpose buildings that were mostly used for housing (8.7%) and 5 other use buildings (commercial or industrial) that also had some housing (2.1%). Of the single family homes 12 were built before 1919, while 36 were built between 1990 and 2000. The greatest number of single family homes (38) were built between 1971 and 1980.

In 2000 there were 325 apartments in the municipality. The most common apartment size was 4 rooms of which there were 103. There were 3 single room apartments and 166 apartments with five or more rooms. Of these apartments, a total of 300 apartments (92.3% of the total) were permanently occupied, while 11 apartments (3.4%) were seasonally occupied and 14 apartments (4.3%) were empty. As of 2009, the construction rate of new housing units was 0 new units per 1000 residents. The vacancy rate for the municipality, in 2010, was 1.74%.

The historical population is given in the following chart:

== Politics ==
In the 2007 federal election the most popular party was the CVP which received 28.6% of the vote. The next three most popular parties were the SVP (22.38%), the SP (20.9%) and the FDP (15.02%). In the federal election, a total of 333 votes were cast, and the voter turnout was 51.0%.

== Economy ==
As of 2010, Halten had an unemployment rate of 1.5%. As of 2008, there were 43 people employed in the primary economic sector and about 13 businesses involved in this sector. 4 people were employed in the secondary sector and there were 2 businesses in this sector. 38 people were employed in the tertiary sector, with 14 businesses in this sector. There were 449 residents of the municipality who were employed in some capacity, of which females made up 41.4% of the workforce.

In 2008 the total number of full-time equivalent jobs was 55. The number of jobs in the primary sector was 24, all of which were in agriculture. The number of jobs in the secondary sector was 4 of which 1 was in manufacturing and 3 (75.0%) were in construction. The number of jobs in the tertiary sector was 27. In the tertiary sector; 4 or 14.8% were in wholesale or retail sales or the repair of motor vehicles, 1 was in the movement and storage of goods, 3 or 11.1% were the insurance or financial industry, 12 or 44.4% were technical professionals or scientists, 4 or 14.8% were in education.

In 2000, there were 18 workers who commuted into the municipality and 385 workers who commuted away. The municipality is a net exporter of workers, with about 21.4 workers leaving the municipality for every one entering. Of the working population, 10.9% used public transportation to get to work, and 65.5% used a private car.

== Religion ==
From the 2000 census, 274 or 34.6% were Roman Catholic, while 345 or 43.6% belonged to the Swiss Reformed Church. Of the rest of the population, there was 1 individual who belongs to the Christian Catholic Church, and there were 8 individuals (or about 1.01% of the population) who belonged to another Christian church. There were 10 (or about 1.26% of the population) who were Islamic. There were 2 individuals who were Buddhist and 1 individual who belonged to another church. 133 (or about 16.81% of the population) belonged to no church, are agnostic or atheist, and 17 individuals (or about 2.15% of the population) did not answer the question.

== Education ==
In Halten about 350 or (44.2%) of the population have completed non-mandatory upper secondary education, and 108 or (13.7%) have completed additional higher education (either university or a Fachhochschule). Of the 108 who completed tertiary schooling, 74.1% were Swiss men, 20.4% were Swiss women.

As of 2000, there were 54 students in Halten who came from another municipality, while 77 residents attended schools outside the municipality.
