= List of twin towns and sister cities in South America =

This is a list of places in the continent of South America which have standing links to local communities in other countries, known as "town twinning" (usually in Europe) or "sister cities" (usually in the rest of the world).

== Bolivia ==
El Alto

- Medellín, Colombia

Cochabamba

- Arequipa, Peru
- Bergamo, Italy
- Córdoba, Argentina
- Kunming, China
- Montevideo, Uruguay

Coroico

- Montevideo, Uruguay

Oruro

- Lima, Peru

Papel Pampa

- Leganés, Spain

La Paz

- Asunción, Paraguay
- Bogotá, Colombia
- Bonn, Germany
- Canelones, Uruguay
- Havana, Cuba
- Libertador (Caracas), Venezuela
- Montevideo, Uruguay
- Moscow, Russia
- Quito, Ecuador
- Rio de Janeiro, Brazil
- São Paulo, Brazil
- Taipei, Taiwan
- Zaragoza, Spain

Potosí

- Cusco, Peru

Sacaba

- Victoria de Durango, Mexico

Samaipata

- Saalfeld, Germany

Santa Cruz de la Sierra

- Asunción, Paraguay
- Córdoba, Argentina
- Curitiba, Brazil
- Medellín, Colombia
- La Plata, Argentina
- Rosario, Argentina
- San Miguel de Tucumán, Argentina
- Santa Cruz de Tenerife, Spain
- Taichung, Taiwan
- Tainan, Taiwan

Sicaya

- Norrtälje, Sweden

Sucre

- La Plata, Argentina
- San Miguel de Tucumán, Argentina

Tarija

- Asunción, Paraguay
- Brasschaat, Belgium
- Iniesta, Spain
- San Bernardino, Paraguay
- San José de Metán, Argentina
- Tournai, Belgium
- Villa Carlos Paz, Argentina

Uriondo

- Mendoza, Argentina

== Colombia ==
Agustín Codazzi

- Lugo, Italy

Armenia

- Doral, United States
- Medellín, Colombia

Barranquilla

- Bethlehem, Palestine
- Brownsville, United States
- Doral, United States
- Kaohsiung, Taiwan
- Miami, United States
- Nanjing, China
- Panama City, Panama
- Rio de Janeiro, Brazil
- Tampa, United States
- Tula, Russia

Bello

- San Nicolás de los Garza, Mexico

Bogotá

- Buenos Aires, Argentina
- Cádiz, Spain
- Chicago, United States
- León, Mexico
- Lima, Peru
- London, England, United Kingdom
- Madrid, Spain
- La Paz, Bolivia
- Quito, Ecuador
- Santa Fe, Spain
- Seoul, South Korea

Bucaramanga

- Ribeirão Preto, Brazil

Buga

- Guadalajara, Spain
- Ourém, Portugal

Cali

- Montevideo, Uruguay

Cartagena

- Acapulco, Mexico
- Angra do Heroísmo, Portugal
- Cachoeira, Brazil
- Cádiz, Spain
- Campeche, Mexico
- Constanța, Romania
- Coral Gables, United States
- Puebla, Mexico
- San Juan, Puerto Rico
- Seville, Spain
- St. Augustine, United States

Chiquinquirá

- Mérida, Mexico

Guachené

- Prairie View, United States

Ibagué

- Vitoria-Gasteiz, Spain

Itagüí

- Saltillo, Mexico

Manizales

- Benidorm, Spain
- (Republic of Ireland) Cork, Ireland
- Miami, United States
- Rosario, Argentina
- San Luis Potosí, Mexico
- Soyapango, El Salvador

Manta

- Prairie View, United States

Manzanares

- Mérida, Mexico

Medellín

- El Alto, Bolivia
- Armenia, Colombia
- Asunción, Paraguay
- Avellaneda, Argentina
- Benito Juárez, Mexico
- Bilbao, Spain
- Chapecó, Brazil
- Concepción, Chile
- Fort Lauderdale, United States
- Monterrey, Mexico
- Orange County, United States
- Panama City, Panama
- Puerto Morelos, Mexico
- Quito, Ecuador
- Rosario, Argentina
- San Pedro Sula, Honduras
- Santa Cruz de la Sierra, Bolivia
- Santo Domingo de los Colorados, Ecuador
- Tacuarembó, Uruguay
- Valparaíso, Chile

Pamplona

- Pamplona, Spain

Pasto

- Cuenca, Ecuador

Pereira

- Miami-Dade County, United States

Popayán

- Caltanissetta, Italy
- Cuenca, Ecuador
- Málaga, Spain

Rionegro

- Biloxi, United States
- Gulfport, United States

San José de Cúcuta

- Leganés, Spain

Santa Fe de Antioquia

- Trujillo, Spain

Tuluá

- Ate, Peru

Tumaco

- Montevideo, Uruguay

== Ecuador ==
Ambato

- Santa Fe, Spain
- Wenzhou, China
- Xalapa, Mexico

Cuenca

- Bandung, Indonesia
- Belo Horizonte, Brazil
- Braga, Portugal
- Cajamarca, Peru
- El Carmen de Viboral, Colombia
- Cienfuegos, Cuba
- Cuenca, Spain
- Cusco, Peru
- Guanajuato, Mexico
- Guarulhos, Brazil
- Huai'an, China
- Newark, United States
- Pasto, Colombia
- Peekskill, United States
- Popayán, Colombia
- Rosario, Argentina
- Salta, Argentina
- San Miguel de Allende, Mexico
- Tempe, United States
- Xi'an, China

Esmeraldas

- Benidorm, Spain
- Montevideo, Uruguay

Guaranda

- Johnson City, United States

Guayaquil

- Houston, United States
- Jesús María, Peru
- Shanghai, China

Loja

- Chiclayo, Peru
- La Huaca, Peru
- Santiago de Surco, Peru
- Vichayal, Peru

Macará

- Leganés, Spain

Manta

- Vladivostok, Russia

Puerto Baquerizo Moreno

- Chapel Hill, United States

Quito

- Bogotá, Colombia
- Cádiz, Spain
- Doha, Qatar
- Guangzhou, China
- Guarulhos, Brazil
- Kraków, Poland
- Lima, Peru
- Louisville, United States
- Madrid, Spain
- Managua, Nicaragua
- Medellín, Colombia
- Mexico City, Mexico
- La Paz, Bolivia
- Taipei, Taiwan

Riobamba

- Norwalk, United States
- Saint-Amand-Montrond, France

Salinas

- Salisbury, United States

Santo Domingo de los Colorados

- Medellín, Colombia

Tena

- Santa Clarita, United States

== Falkland Islands ==
Stanley

- Airdrie, Scotland, United Kingdom
- Whitby, England, United Kingdom

== Guyana ==
Georgetown

- Fuzhou, China
- Port of Spain, Trinidad and Tobago
- St. Louis, United States

Linden

- Nanchuan (Chongqing), China

== Paraguay ==
Asunción

- Brasília, Brazil
- Buenos Aires, Argentina
- Campinas, Brazil
- Canelones, Uruguay
- Chapecó, Brazil
- Chiba, Japan
- Curitiba, Brazil
- Florianópolis, Brazil
- Florida, Uruguay
- Madrid, Spain
- Medellín, Colombia
- Miami-Dade County, United States
- Montevideo, Uruguay
- La Paz, Bolivia
- La Plata, Argentina
- Quito, Ecuador
- Río Cuarto, Argentina
- Rosario, Argentina
- San José, Costa Rica
- Santa Cruz de la Sierra, Bolivia
- Santo Domingo, Dominican Republic
- São Paulo, Brazil
- São Vicente, Brazil
- Songpa (Seoul), South Korea
- Taipei, Taiwan
- Tarija, Bolivia
- Vitoria-Gasteiz, Spain
- Yerba Buena, Argentina

Fernando de la Mora

- Florianópolis, Brazil
- Pittsburgh, United States
- Santos, Brazil

General Artigas

- Fray Bentos, Uruguay

Hernandarias

- Foz do Iguaçu, Brazil

Presidente Franco

- Acquarossa, Switzerland
- Florianópolis, Brazil
- Puerto Iguazú, Argentina

San Bernardino

- Tarija, Bolivia

San Juan Nepomuceno

- Štěchovice, Czech Republic

Santa María de Fe

- Hays, United States

Villa Hayes

- Fremont, United States

== Peru ==
Arequipa

- Arica, Chile
- Biella, Italy
- Charlotte, United States
- Cochabamba, Bolivia
- Corrientes, Argentina
- Guanajuato, Mexico
- Guangzhou, China
- Iquique, Chile
- Lins, Brazil
- Maui County, United States
- Morelia, Mexico
- Ponta Grossa, Brazil
- Puebla, Mexico
- El Tocuyo, Venezuela

Ate

- Tuluá, Colombia
- Valle de Trápaga-Trapagaran, Spain
- Villa María, Argentina

Callao

- Boryspil, Ukraine
- Comerío, Puerto Rico
- Constanța, Romania
- Mayagüez, Puerto Rico
- Quebradillas, Puerto Rico
- San Germán, Puerto Rico
- Santos, Brazil
- Valparaíso, Chile
- Veracruz, Mexico

Chaclacayo

- Snoqualmie, United States

Chiclayo

- Loja, Ecuador

Chimbote

- Pensacola, United States

Cusco

- Andong, South Korea
- Athens, Greece
- Baguio, Philippines
- Bethlehem, Palestine
- Copán Ruinas, Honduras
- Cuenca, Ecuador
- Havana, Cuba
- Jersey City, United States
- Jerusalem, Israel
- Kaesong, North Korea
- Kraków, Poland
- Madison, United States
- Mexico City, Mexico
- Moscow, Russia
- La Paz, Bolivia
- Potosí, Bolivia
- Puebla, Mexico
- Rio de Janeiro, Brazil
- Samarkand, Uzbekistan
- San Miguel de Allende, Mexico
- Tempe, United States

La Huaca

- Loja, Ecuador

Jesús María

- Guayaquil, Ecuador

Lima

- Akhisar, Turkey
- Asunción, Paraguay
- Austin, United States
- Beijing, China
- Bogotá, Colombia
- Bordeaux, France
- Buenos Aires, Argentina
- Cleveland, United States
- Dhaka, Bangladesh
- Guadalajara, Mexico
- Karaçoban, Turkey
- Kyiv, Ukraine
- Madrid, Spain
- Miami, United States
- Oruro, Bolivia
- Pescara, Italy
- Quito, Ecuador
- San Salvador, El Salvador
- Santa Ana, Costa Rica
- São Paulo, Brazil
- Shanghai, China
- Stamford, United States
- Taipei, Taiwan

Miraflores

- Las Condes, Chile
- Pensacola, United States
- San Borja, Peru
- Sonsonate, El Salvador
- Viña del Mar, Chile

Pisco

- Cognac, France
- Jerez de la Frontera, Spain
- Rosario, Argentina
- Tequila, Mexico

Piura

- Oklahoma City, United States
- Trujillo, Spain

San Borja

- Jericho, Palestine
- Miraflores, Peru
- Ramat Gan, Israel
- Veintiséis de Octubre, Peru

San Isidro

- Bahía Blanca, Argentina

Santiago de Surco

- Gastonia, United States
- Loja, Ecuador

Tambo de Mora

- Montevideo, Uruguay

Trujillo

- Metepec, Mexico
- Pabillonis, Italy
- Sucy-en-Brie, France
- Trujillo, Spain

Vichayal

- Loja, Ecuador

Villa El Salvador

- Amstelveen, Netherlands
- Arnhem, Netherlands
- Santa Coloma de Gramenet, Spain
- Tübingen, Germany

== Suriname ==
Marowijne

- Koksijde, Belgium

Paramaribo

- Hangzhou, China
- Miami-Dade County, United States
- Yogyakarta, Indonesia

== Uruguay ==
Atlántida

- Novo Hamburgo, Brazil

Artigas

- Paraná, Argentina

Canelones

- Asunción, Paraguay
- Loudoun County, United States
- Novo Hamburgo, Brazil
- La Paz, Bolivia

Ciudad de la Costa

- Hollywood, United States

Colonia del Sacramento

- Antigua Guatemala, Guatemala
- Guimarães, Portugal
- Olinda, Brazil
- Pelotas, Brazil
- Quilmes, Argentina

Florida

- Asunción, Paraguay
- Gansu Province, China
- Kaifeng, China
- Shenyang, China

Fray Bentos

- General Artigas, Paraguay

Maldonado

- Gramado, Brazil
- Miami-Dade County, United States
- La Plata, Argentina
- Puerto Varas, Chile

Montevideo

- Almirante Brown, Argentina
- Arica, Chile
- Asunción, Paraguay
- Barcelona, Spain
- Bluefields, Nicaragua
- Buenos Aires, Argentina
- Brasília, Brazil
- Cádiz, Spain
- Cali, Colombia
- Cochabamba, Bolivia
- Córdoba, Argentina
- Coroico, Bolivia
- Curitiba, Brazil
- Esmeraldas, Ecuador
- Hurlingham, Argentina
- Havana, Cuba
- Laayoune, Western Sahara
- Libertador (Caracas), Venezuela
- Madrid, Spain
- Mar del Plata, Argentina
- Marsico Nuovo, Italy
- Melilla, Spain
- Montevideo, United States
- La Paz, Bolivia
- La Plata, Argentina
- Port-au-Prince, Haiti
- Rio de Janeiro, Brazil
- Rosario, Argentina
- Santa Cruz de la Sierra, Bolivia
- Santa Fe, Argentina
- Talamanca, Costa Rica
- Tambo de Mora, Peru
- Tito, Italy
- Tumaco, Colombia

Nueva Helvecia

- Subingen, Switzerland

Punta del Este

- Balneário Camboriú, Brazil
- Benito Juárez, Mexico
- Marbella, Spain
- Porto Alegre, Brazil

Rosario

- Subingen, Switzerland

Tacuarembó

- Medellín, Colombia

== Venezuela ==
Caracas

- Adeje, Spain
- A Coruña, Spain
- Guadalajara, Mexico
- Madrid, Spain
- Melilla, Spain
- New Orleans, United States
- Panama City, Panama
- Rosario, Argentina
- Rio de Janeiro, Brazil
- Santa Cruz de Tenerife, Spain
- Santo Domingo, Dominican Republic
- Tehran, Iran
- Vigo, Spain

Caracas – Libertador

- Doha, Qatar
- Montevideo, Uruguay
- La Paz, Bolivia

Colonia Tovar

- Veliko Tarnovo, Bulgaria

Diego Bautista Urbaneja

- Hollywood, United States

Córdoba

- Córdoba, Argentina

Coro

- La Plata, Argentina

Cumaná

- Tepebaşı, Turkey

Maracaibo

- New Orleans, United States

Maracay

- Izhevsk, Russia

Mérida

- Mérida, Mexico
- Oaxaca de Juárez, Mexico

El Tocuyo

- Arequipa, Peru

Valencia

- Plovdiv, Bulgaria
- Valencia, Spain
