= Ignacio Escudero District =

Coordinates: 4°50′35″S 80°52′12″W

Ignacio Escudero
- District
- Interactive map of Ignacio Escudero
- Country: Peru
- Region: Piura
- Province: Sullana
- Founded: September 10, 1965
- Capital: San Jacinto

Government
  - Mayor: Alexander Nuñez Gomez

Area
  - Total: 306.53 km^{2} (118.35 sq mi)
- Elevation: 35 m (115 ft)

Population (2005 census)
  - Total: 16,993
  - Density: 55.437/km^{2} (143.58/sq mi)
- Time zone: UTC-5 (PET)
- UBIGEO: 200603

Ignacio Escudero District is one of eight districts of the province Sullana in Peru, part of the region of Piura.

== History ==
Those traveling by the Panamerican highway between Talara and Sullana may clearly observe a hill that appears as if the top had been cut off. It is said that due to the flooding of the Chira river, the Zapotoleños had to leave in search of safer regions, locating themselves in the elevated region known as "Cerro Mocho." Other went to Ventarrones, Monte Lima, or Alto Grande. The Zapotoleños, needing materials to construct their huts, began to cut stone blocks from the hill (cerro) until they left it cut (mocho). The older residents will say the owners of the hacienda on which the hill was located ordered their peons to level the peak to construct the houses of their haciendas on the hill, but later abandoned the task because it was too difficult. In the end the landowners constructed their houses on the lower part of the hill and still be seen, even in ruins.

Initially the jurisdiction of the area was left to the district of Tamarindo in the province of Paita. Due to the difficulties of communication with Peita, the residents requested to become administratively part of Sullana. The project of the creation of a district began on 16 October 1963 when the project signed by the deputies, Luis Carnero Checa, and Juan Aldana Gonzáles of Piura, and Felipe García Figallo of Sullana. On 10 September 1965 Law 15611 created the district, with the capital at San Jacinto, dismembering the district from Paita. On 25 October 1965, the governor of Tamarindo, Santos Oblea ended his term as municipal agent, since Sullana had chosen Jorge Hougthon Aguirre as municipal agent. However, under local law, Santos Oblea continued to exercise the role of municipal agent until 31 December 1966, and from 1 January 1967 he was installed as the first municipal governor, with Ignacio Coronado Pena as mayor.

== Geography and Climate ==
Ignacio Escudero district can be found at the eastern margin of the River Chira at 35 meters above sea level. It is about 25 kilometers from the city of Sullana, via the Panamerican highway. Its area is a total of 306.53 km², and there are 14,765 inhabitants. The capital is seated at San Jacinto, but to most it is known as "Cerro Mocho." The district is bordered on the north and east by the district of Marcavelica. To the south the river its boundaries are the Chira and to the west the district of Tamarindo in the Province of Paita.

The climate is hot between 90 and 100 °F, with irregular rains. The winter is slightly cold with a low of 68 °F.

The following pueblos (villages) are located in the region: Belén, Buenos Aires, Cerro Mocho, La Cancha, Las Malvinas, San Isidro, San Martín y San Pedro, San Vicente, Monte Lima y San Jacinto. Additionally there are the following caseríos (hamlets): San Miguel, Santa Sofía, Ventarrones, Agua Amarga, Algarrobo Seco, Chombos, Cruz de Cañete, Hualtacal, Hualtaco Raizado, Jaguay Negro, Orejona, Pampa Larga, Pescado, San José y San Rolando.
