= Italian Bolivians =

Bolivian citizens of Italian descent

Italo-boliviani (Italian) Ítalo-bolivianos (Spanish)
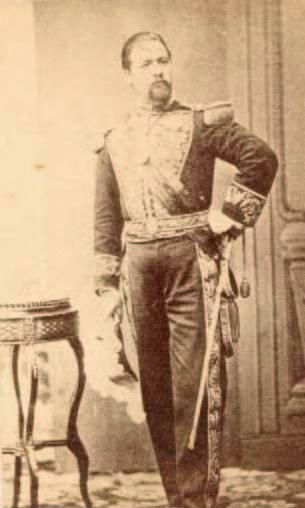
- Hilarion Daza Groselle, President of Bolivia from 1876 to 1879. He was of Piedmontese origin

Total population
- c. 2,700 (by birth) c. 15,000 (by ancestry)

Regions with significant populations
- La Paz and Santa Cruz

Languages
- Bolivian Spanish · Italian and Italian dialects

Religion
- Roman Catholic

Related ethnic groups
- Italians, Italian Americans, Italian Argentines, Italian Brazilians, Italian Canadians, Italian Chileans, Italian Colombians, Italian Costa Ricans, Italian Cubans, Italian Dominicans, Italian Ecuadorians, Italian Guatemalans, Italian Haitians, Italian Hondurans, Italian Mexicans, Italian Panamanians, Italian Paraguayans, Italian Peruvians, Italian Puerto Ricans, Italian Salvadorans, Italian Uruguayans, Italian Venezuelans

Italian Bolivians (Italian: italo-boliviani; Spanish: ítalo-bolivianos) are Bolivian-born citizens of totally or partially Italian descent, whose ancestors were Italians who emigrated to Bolivia during the Italian diaspora, or Italian-born people in Bolivia.

== History ==
A few dozen Italians moved to Bolivia before the wars of independence made by Simón Bolívar. From the beginning of the 19th century, a few hundred Italians arrived in the country from northern Chile, working in the construction of railways, and some settled in the region of La Paz, to set up commercial enterprises especially in the textile and food sector.

In 1876, a descendant of Italians originating from Piedmont, Hilarion Daza Groselle, was president of Bolivia.

In 1889 — according to the Italian Consulate — about 400 Italians lived in Bolivia, distributed as follows: 40 Italians in La Paz, 20 in Oruro, 29 in Cochabamba, 31 in Sucre, 44 in the hot lands of Santa Cruz, 38 in Tarija and 16 in Potosí, over another hundred in other locales, for a total of between 300 and 350 people.

In the early years of the 20th century, a considerable number of Italians in Bolivia were engaged in commercial activities, but there were also some professionals such as architects, engineers and doctors, and several religious figures. In 1910, the Società Italiana di Beneficenza Roma ("Italian Charity Society Rome") was founded to help the poor Italians, and in 1934 Casa Italia was created in La Paz as the main meeting place for the small community.

After various vicissitudes related to the two world wars, the number of Italian citizens has stabilized to around 2,000–3,000, and is concentrated in the metropolitan areas of La Paz, Sucre, Santa Cruz and Cochabamba. All are integrated into Bolivian society, where many have reached the highest levels. In addition, there are some Italian associations, such as the Circolo culturale italiano ("Italian cultural circle") of La Paz and that of Santa Cruz.

In 2010, there were over 15,000 Bolivians of Italian descent, while there were around 2,700 Italian citizens. One of the most famous Bolivians of Italian ancestry is the writer and poet Óscar Cerruto, considered one of the great authors of Bolivian literature.

== Notable Italian Bolivians ==
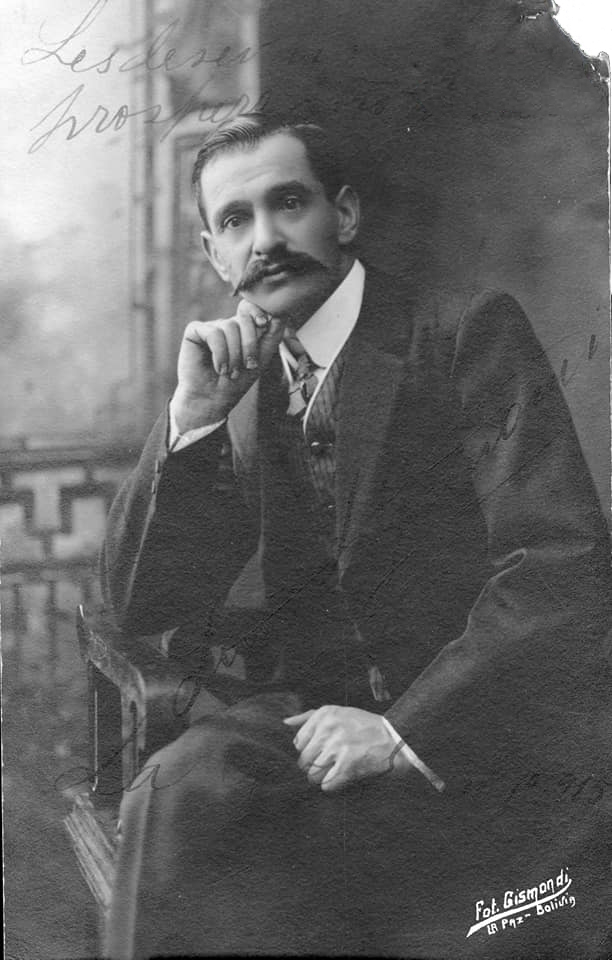
Luigi Domenico Gismondi

- Paolo Agazzi, film director and screenwriter
- Angel Gelmi Bertocchi, bishop
- Germán Busch, military officer and statesman
- Roberto Capparelli, footballer
- Óscar Cerruto, poet, novelist, short story writer, journalist and diplomat
- Hilarión Daza, military officer
- Pablo Escobar, footballer
- Dionisio Foianini, politician and businessman
- Luigi Domenico Gismondi, photographer, photographic-supplies vendor and postcard publisher
- Damián Lizio, footballer

== See also ==
- Italian diaspora
- Bolivia-Italy relations
- Immigration to Bolivia

== Bibliography ==
- Belmonte Pijuán, Mauricio. Polenta.Familias Italianas en Bolivia. Editor Rolando Diez de Medina. La Paz, 2011 (in Spanish).
- Guarnieri Carducci, Luigi. L'emigrazione italiana in Bolivia dall'Unità alla fine del XX secolo: periodizzazione e caratteristiche. Università di Teramo. Teramo, 2003 (in Italian).
