= Paita =

- City
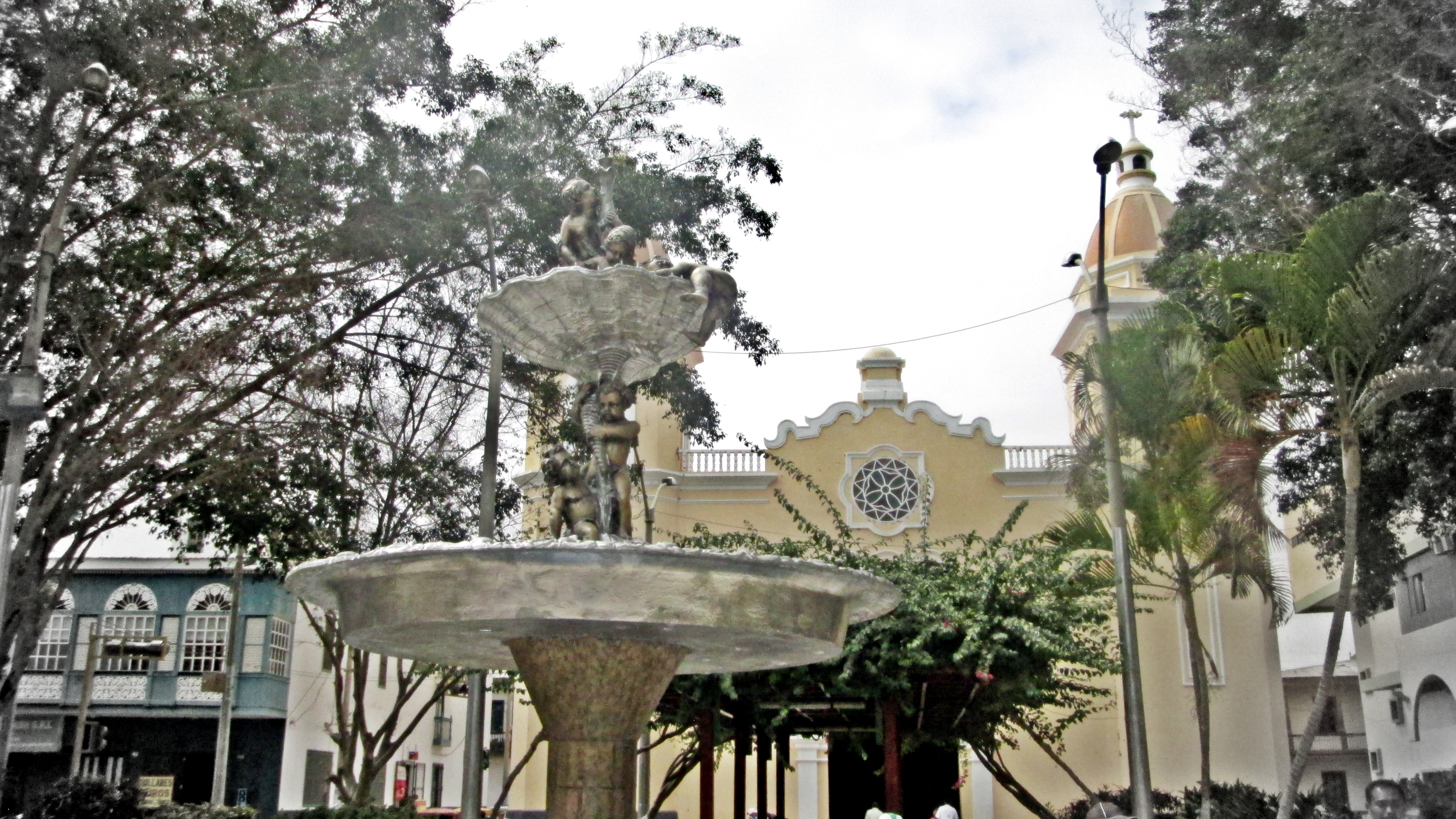
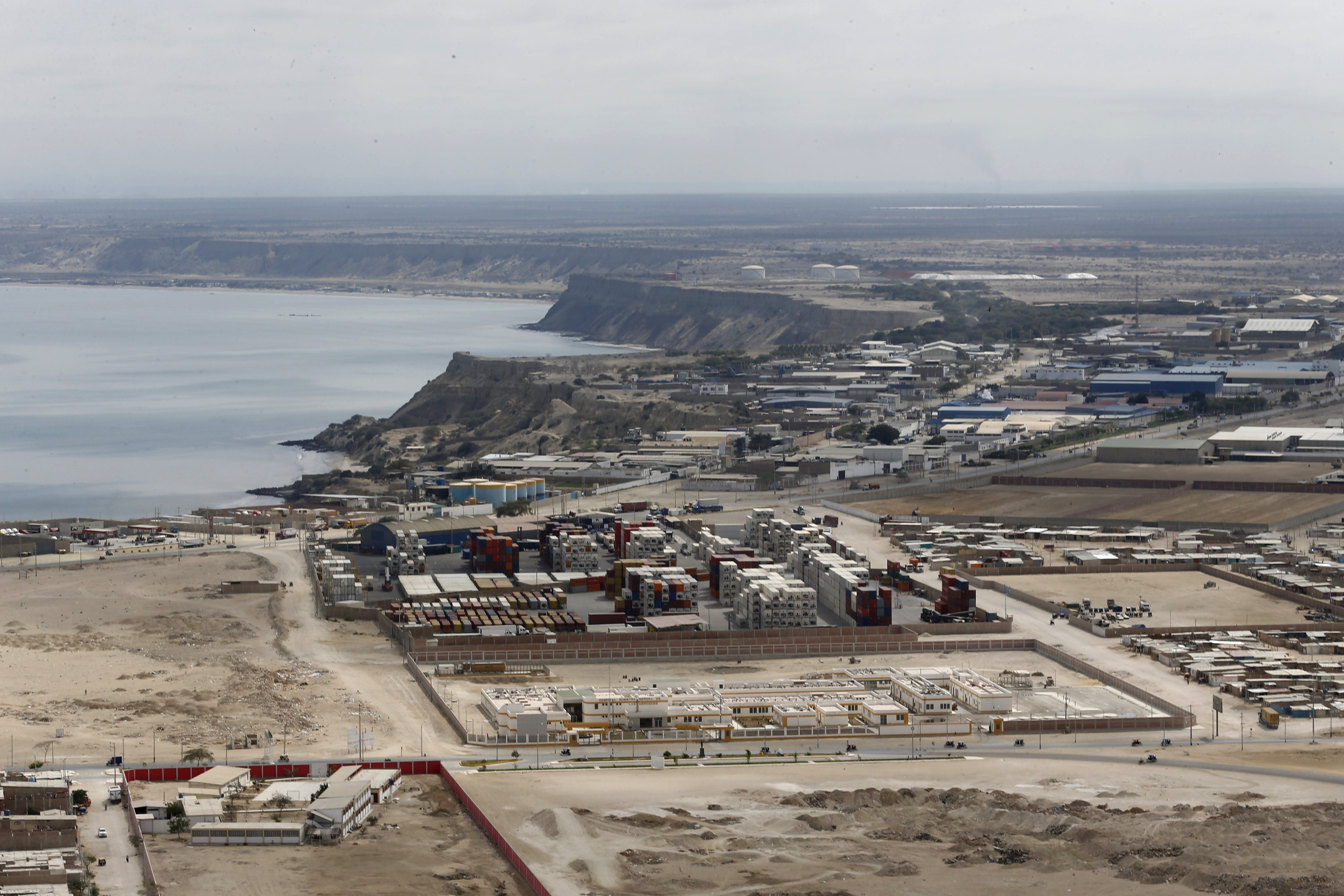
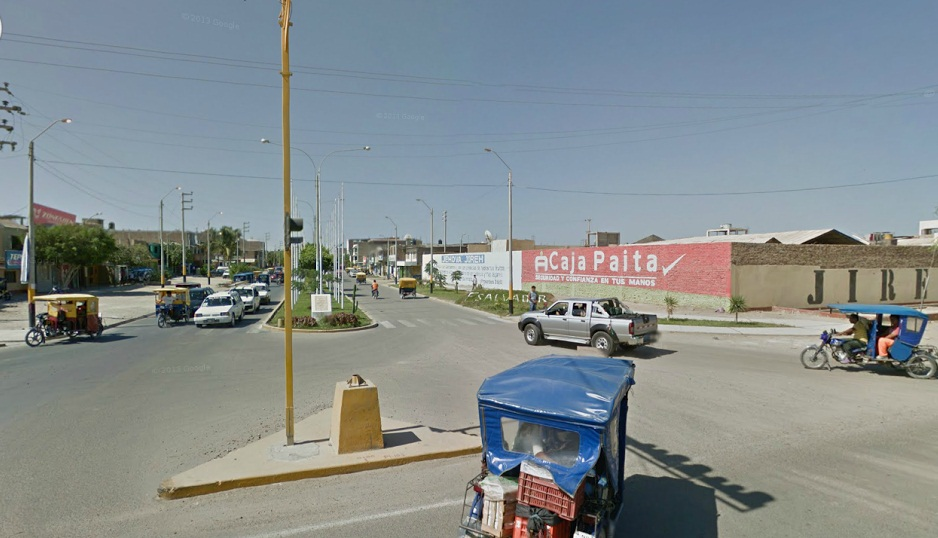
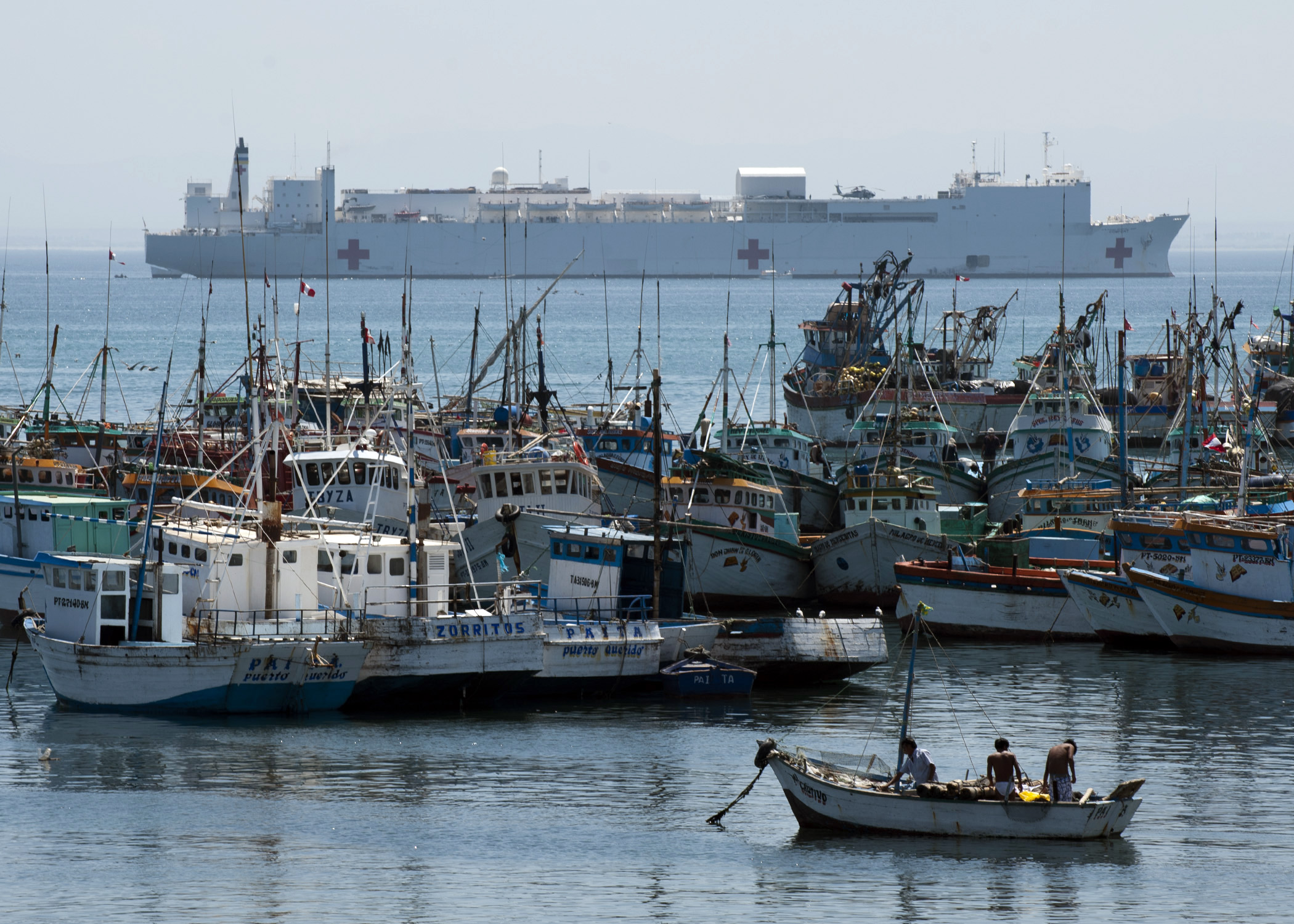

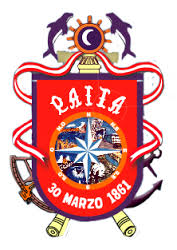
- Flag Seal

- Location within Peru
- Coordinates: 5°5′28″S 81°06′23″W
- Country: Peru
- Region: Piura
- Province: Paita
- District: Paita
- Established: 1782

Government
  - Mayor: Teodoro Edilberto Alvarado Alayo

Area
  - Total: 1,768.65 km^{2} (682.88 sq mi)
- Elevation: 350 m (1,150 ft)

Population (2016)
  - Total: 179,346
  - Estimate (2015): 168 900
- Demonym: Paiteño (a)
- Time zone: UTC-5 (PET)
  - Summer (DST): UTC-5 (PET)
- Website: munipaita.gob.pe

Paita is a city in northwestern Peru. It is the capital of the Paita Province which is in the Piura Region. It is a leading seaport in the region. Paita is located 1,089 km northwest of the country's capital Lima, and 57 km northwest of the regional capital of Piura. Starting in 2014, the city has considered ideas for separating from the Piura Region, proclaiming itself as the "Miguel Grau Region".

== Geography ==
Paita is located at 05°05′28″S 81°06′23″W on a small peninsula south of the mouth of the Río Chira on an area of 1,785 km^{2}. Paita faces the Bay of Paita, and is sheltered from southerly winds by a headland called Punta Paita and by a large hill called Silla de Paita. 90 km to the southeast is the capital of the Piura Region, Piura, and 160 km to the south is located Chiclayo, commercial centre of the Lambayeque region.

== Population ==
The population of Paita was 3,800 in 1906, 20,000 in 1993, 122,127 in 2007, and 168,900 in 2015.

== History ==
=== Prehistoric era ===
Paleontologist Edgar Herning collected remains in 1978. He determined from his findings that the peoples here were a highly evolved cultural group, as there was evidence of primitive villages on the coast of Paita like Colan, Tayta, and Amotape from up to 9,000 years ago.

The Tallán language was once spoken in Paita, as well as Catacaos and other nearby locations.

=== Colonial period ===
The city was founded on 30 March 1532 by the conqueror Francisco Pizarro, who named it San Francisco de Paita of Good Hope.

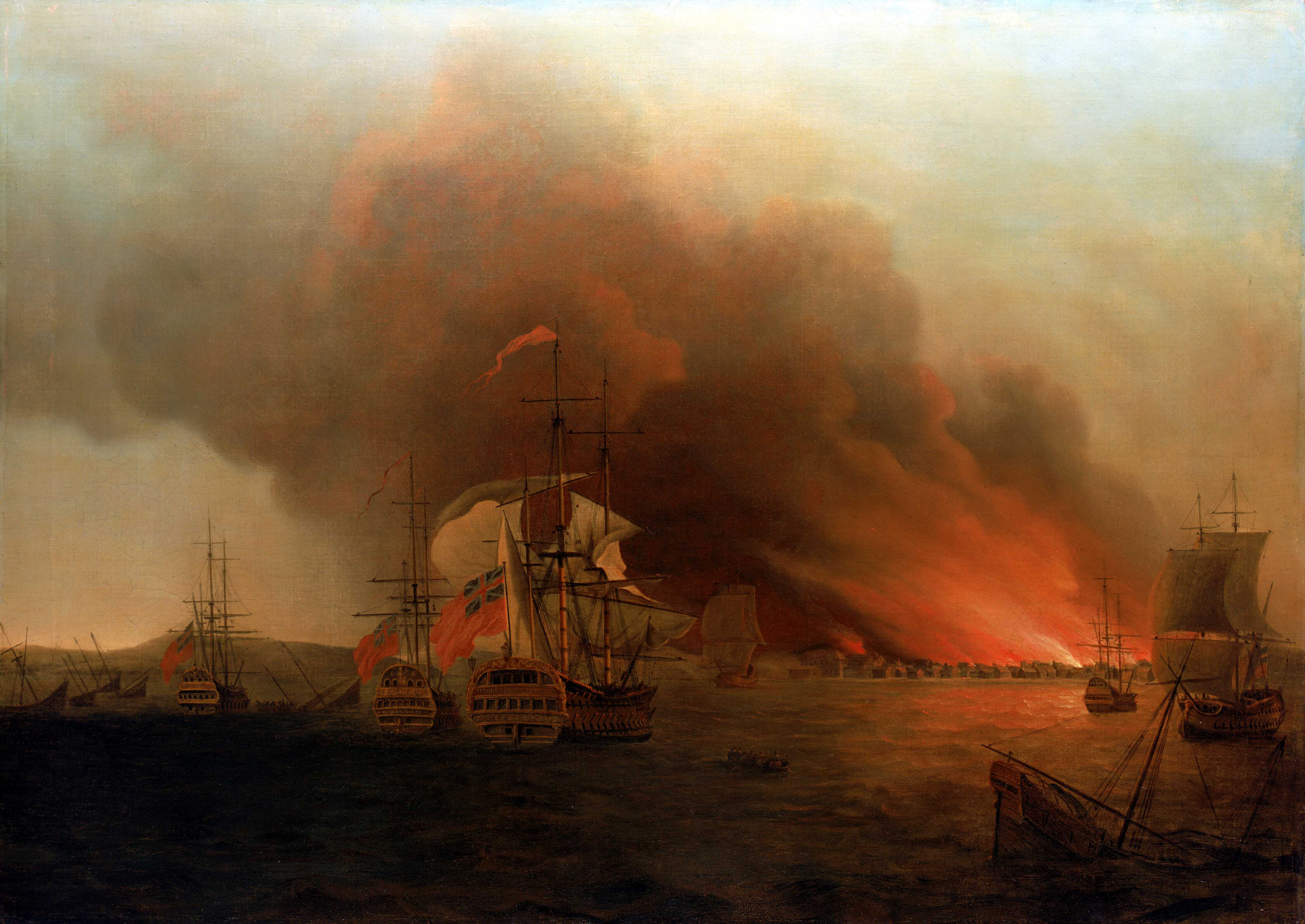
The Burning of Payta, November 1741, by Anson

From 1578 to 1588, Paita was the Spanish capital of the northwestern Peruvian coast, before attacks from English pirates and corsairs made it necessary to relocate the capital to Piura. Paita was the port for Peru and the end terminus of the Manila Galleons connecting Latin-America with Asia.

The port of Paita is best known to many Peruvians as the former home of Manuela Sáenz, Simón Bolívar's lover.

=== Whaling port of call ===
Paita was a significant port of call for whaling ships in the first half of the 19th century. The whaling grounds west of Peru were popular with British and American whaling ships that often called at Paita for supplies and repairs. Local men were sometimes recruited to serve as crewmen on these vessels. The first vessel known to have called was the British whaleship Emilia in 1792. Sixty-four American whaleships visited in 1833 alone. So many American vessels called that in 1833 the United States government decided to establish a consulate at Paita. A hospital was established for American seamen in the 1840s. The large protected Bay of Paita provided a safe anchorage for visiting vessels and the irrigated farms of the nearby Chira Valley produced a wide range of agricultural produce for the whalers. The money they injected into the local economy provided substantial economic benefits to the town and hinterlands, and this continued till American whaling visits began to taper off in the 1860s.

== Industry ==
In 1875, a railway line of 97 km length was completed from Piura to Paita, but it was destroyed in the war with Chile from 1879 to 1883 and reconstructed in 1884. A street railway opened on 30 August 1891 and ran until the late 1920s.

Today the port of Paita is Peru's second-largest port and an important container port. It is located in a geopolitically important position on the Pacific coast.

Paita has one of the best natural harbours on the Peruvian coast. Regular mail steamers run between Valparaíso and Panama.

== Celebrations ==
On 24 September the Fiesta de Nuestra Señora de las Mercedes is celebrated, lasting a week and including pilgrimages in honor of the Catholic icon.

== Twin towns and sister cities ==
- Panama City, Panama
- Balboa, Panama
- Munich, Germany
- Callao, Peru
- Tokyo, Japan
- Lima, Peru
- Beijing, China
- Riga, Latvia
- Barcelona, Spain
- New York, United States
- Manta, Ecuador
- Guayaquil (Guayas), Ecuador
- Quito (Pichincha), Ecuador
- Mexico City, Mexico
- Caracas, Venezuela

== Cultural references ==
The Golden Ocean by Patrick O'Brian, first published in 1954 then again in 1996, mentions the successful attack of Anson's squadron at Paita on his voyage around the world, taking a prize of merchant's gold, silver, and trade goods valued at 30,000 British pounds.

In the 1947 film Dark Passage, Humphrey Bogart's character, falsely blamed for three murders, flees to Paita, with hopes of linking up with a love interest. He tells her of "a little cafe right on the bay". Parts of the telephone conversation are used in the 1982 film Dead Men Don't Wear Plaid.

In the book “The Loss of the Ship Essex, Sunk by a Whale,” cabin boy Thomas Nickerson describes Paita as a “place of considerable note.” He describes it as a port town with an “excellent harbor” for whaling ships like the Essex, of which vessel he was cabin boy. He visited this port during the ill fated voyage (1819-1820) in which the whaling boat Essex from Nantucket was “stove by a whale” and sunk, leaving the desperate crew adrift in three small open boats for ninety days.

== Notable people ==
- Miguel Grau : National Hero of Peru and one of the most important sailors of Peru.
- Luigi Alva : Light tenor.
- Luciano Castillo Colonna : Peruvian politician, university professor and lawyer, founder of the Socialist Party of Peru in 1930.
- Pilar Pallete : Peruvian-born American painter.
- Antonio de la Haza : Sailor and hero of the Peruvian-Ecuadorian War (1858-1860).
- Camilo Carrillo : Politician, mathematician and sailor. He participated in the Pacific War and in the Combat of Dos de Mayo.
