= Bolken =

- Municipality
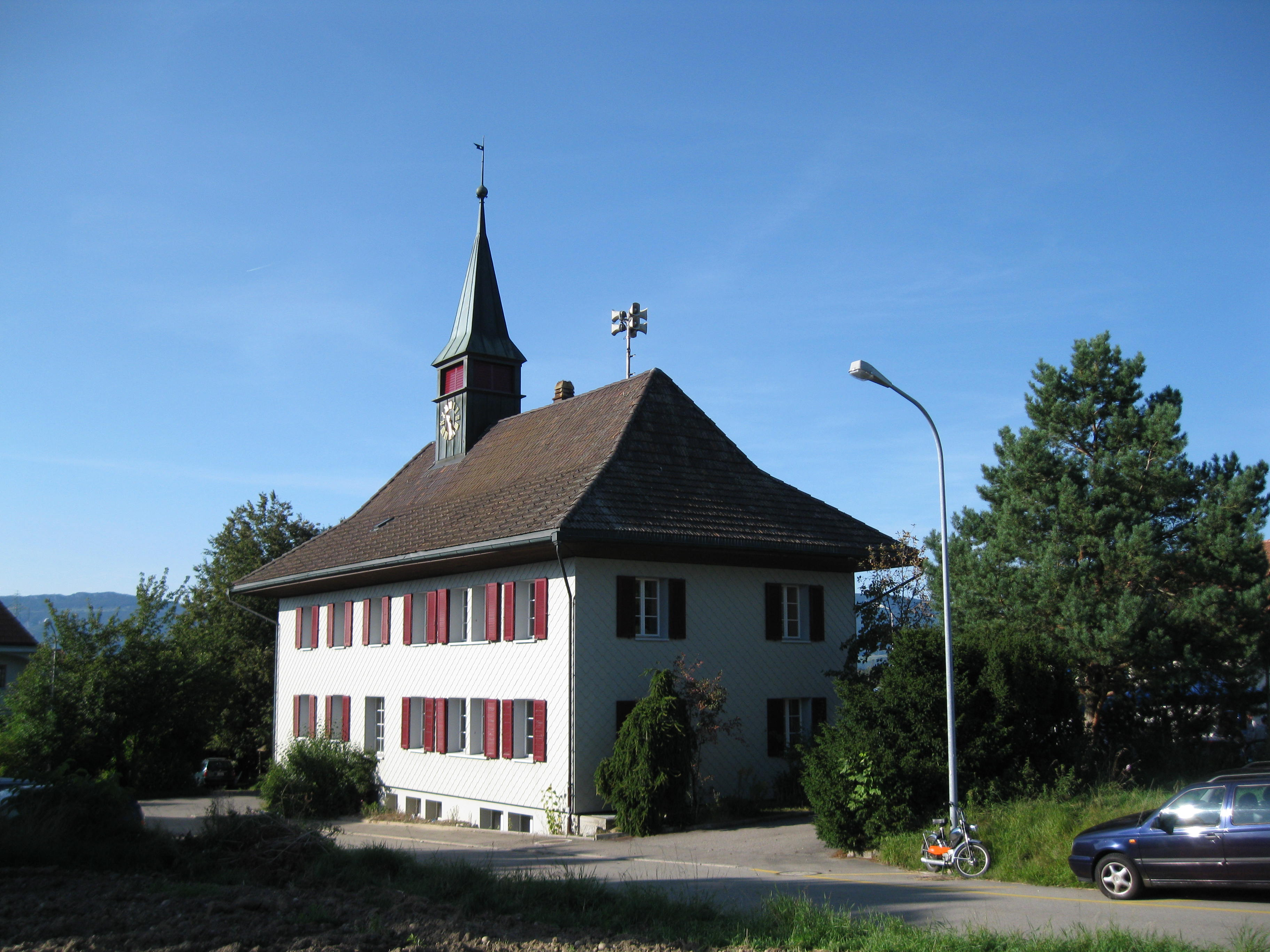
- Bolken village school house

- Coat of arms
- Location of Bolken
- Location within Switzerland Location within Canton of Solothurn
- Coordinates: 47°12′N 7°40′E
- Country: Switzerland
- Canton: Solothurn
- District: Wasseramt

Area
  - Total: 2.12 km^{2} (0.82 sq mi)
- Elevation: 496 m (1,627 ft)

Population (December 2020)
  - Total: 590
  - Density: 280/km^{2} (720/sq mi)
- Time zone: UTC+01:00 (CET)
  - Summer (DST): UTC+02:00 (CEST)
- Postal code: 4556
- SFOS number: 2514
- ISO 3166 code: CH-SO
- Surrounded by: Aeschi, Etziken, Inkwil (BE), Niederönz (BE), Subingen
- Website: http://www.bolken.ch SFSO statistics

Bolken is a municipality in the district of Wasseramt in the canton of Solothurn in Switzerland.

== History ==
Bolken is first mentioned in 1429 as ze Bollikon.

== Geography ==
Bolken has an area, as of 2009, of 2.12 square kilometers (0.82 sq mi). Of this area, 1.37 km^{2} (0.53 sq mi) or 64.6% is used for agricultural purposes, while 0.46 km^{2} (0.18 sq mi) or 21.7% is forested. Of the rest of the land, 0.26 km^{2} (0.10 sq mi) or 12.3% is settled (buildings or roads), 0.04 km^{2} (9.9 acres) or 1.9% is either rivers or lakes.

Of the built up area, housing and buildings made up 6.6% and transportation infrastructure made up 5.7%. Out of the forested land, all of the forested land area is covered with heavy forests. Of the agricultural land, 55.2% is used for growing crops and 8.5% is pastures. All the water in the municipality is in lakes.

The municipality is located in the Wasseramt district, on the moraine landscape left behind by the Rhone glacier. It lies on the border with the Canton of Bern and consists of the haufendorf village (an irregular, unplanned and quite closely packed village, built around a central square) of Bolken and the Inkwilersee (Inkwiler lake).

== Coat of arms ==
The blazon of the municipal coat of arms is Gules a Ploughshare Argent between two Mullets of Five of the last in chief.

== Demographics ==
Bolken has a population (as of December 2020) of 590. As of 2008, 4.5% of the population are resident foreign nationals. Over the last 10 years (1999–2009) the population has changed at a rate of 12%. It has changed at a rate of 3.7% due to migration and at a rate of 7.7% due to births and deaths.

Most of the population (as of 2000) speaks German (465 or 95.1%), with French being second most common (9 or 1.8%) and Albanian being third (6 or 1.2%).

As of 2008, the gender distribution of the population was 51.6% male and 48.4% female. The population was made up of 264 Swiss men (49.0% of the population) and 14 (2.6%) non-Swiss men. There were 253 Swiss women (46.9%) and 8 (1.5%) non-Swiss women. Of the population in the municipality 139 or about 28.4% were born in Bolken and lived there in 2000. There were 138 or 28.2% who were born in the same canton, while 163 or 33.3% were born somewhere else in Switzerland, and 34 or 7.0% were born outside of Switzerland.

In 2008 there were 4 live births to Swiss citizens and were 3 deaths of Swiss citizens. Ignoring immigration and emigration, the population of Swiss citizens increased by 1 while the foreign population remained the same. There . At the same time, there was 1 non-Swiss man and 3 non-Swiss women who emigrated from Switzerland to another country. The total Swiss population change in 2008 (from all sources, including moves across municipal borders) was an increase of 4 and the non-Swiss population decreased by 10 people. This represents a population growth rate of -1.1%.

The age distribution, as of 2000, in Bolken is; 52 children or 10.6% of the population are between 0 and 6 years old and 92 teenagers or 18.8% are between 7 and 19. Of the adult population, 21 people or 4.3% of the population are between 20 and 24 years old. 180 people or 36.8% are between 25 and 44, and 102 people or 20.9% are between 45 and 64. The senior population distribution is 38 people or 7.8% of the population are between 65 and 79 years old and there are 4 people or 0.8% who are over 80.

As of 2000, there were 200 people who were single and never married in the municipality. There were 246 married individuals, 18 widows or widowers and 25 individuals who are divorced.

As of 2000, there were 183 private households in the municipality, and an average of 2.7 persons per household. There were 47 households that consist of only one person and 14 households with five or more people. Out of a total of 184 households that answered this question, 25.5% were households made up of just one person. Of the rest of the households, there are 44 married couples without children, 84 married couples with children There were 8 single parents with a child or children.

In 2000 there were 114 single family homes (or 76.5% of the total) out of a total of 149 inhabited buildings. There were 14 multi-family buildings (9.4%), along with 17 multi-purpose buildings that were mostly used for housing (11.4%) and 4 other use buildings (commercial or industrial) that also had some housing (2.7%). Of the single family homes 7 were built before 1919, while 39 were built between 1990 and 2000.

In 2000 there were 187 apartments in the municipality. The most common apartment size was 5 rooms of which there were 59. There were 3 single room apartments and 97 apartments with five or more rooms. Of these apartments, a total of 179 apartments (95.7% of the total) were permanently occupied, while 4 apartments (2.1%) were seasonally occupied and 4 apartments (2.1%) were empty. As of 2009, the construction rate of new housing units was 5.6 new units per 1000 residents. The vacancy rate for the municipality, in 2010, was 0.93%.

The historical population is given in the following chart:

== Heritage sites of national significance ==
It is home to one or more prehistoric pile-dwelling (or stilt house) settlements that are part of the Prehistoric Pile dwellings around the Alps UNESCO World Heritage Site. The Inkwilersee, a Paleolithic, Neolithic and Bronze Age lake shore settlement, is listed as a Swiss heritage site of national significance.

== Politics ==
In the 2007 federal election the most popular party was the CVP which received 22.52% of the vote. The next three most popular parties were the SVP (21.85%), the FDP (21.27%) and the SP (20.93%). In the federal election, a total of 173 votes were cast, and the voter turnout was 46.5%.

== Economy ==
As of 2010, Bolken had an unemployment rate of 0.9%. As of 2008, there were 21 people employed in the primary economic sector and about 5 businesses involved in this sector. 7 people were employed in the secondary sector and there were 3 businesses in this sector. 14 people were employed in the tertiary sector, with 4 businesses in this sector. There were 272 residents of the municipality who were employed in some capacity, of which females made up 44.9% of the workforce.

In 2008 the total number of full-time equivalent jobs was 25. The number of jobs in the primary sector was 10, all of which were in agriculture. The number of jobs in the secondary sector was 6 of which 1 was in manufacturing and 5 (83.3%) were in construction. The number of jobs in the tertiary sector was 9. In the tertiary sector; 3 or 33.3% were in a hotel or restaurant, 1 was in the information industry, 5 or 55.6% were in education.

In 2000, there were 13 workers who commuted into the municipality and 234 workers who commuted away. The municipality is a net exporter of workers, with about 18.0 workers leaving the municipality for every one entering. Of the working population, 16.2% used public transportation to get to work, and 65.8% used a private car.

== Religion ==
From the 2000 census, 147 or 30.1% were Roman Catholic, while 235 or 48.1% belonged to the Swiss Reformed Church. Of the rest of the population, there were 3 individuals (or about 0.61% of the population) who belonged to the Christian Catholic Church, and there were 12 individuals (or about 2.45% of the population) who belonged to another Christian church. There were 5 (or about 1.02% of the population) who were Islamic. There were 3 individuals who belonged to another church. 73 (or about 14.93% of the population) belonged to no church, are agnostic or atheist, and 11 individuals (or about 2.25% of the population) did not answer the question.

== Education ==
In Bolken about 188 or (38.4%) of the population have completed non-mandatory upper secondary education, and 71 or (14.5%) have completed additional higher education (either university or a Fachhochschule). Of the 71 who completed tertiary schooling, 80.3% were Swiss men, 14.1% were Swiss women.

As of 2000, there were 35 students from Bolken who attended schools outside the municipality.
