= Inkwilersee =

Lake in Solothurn, Switzerland

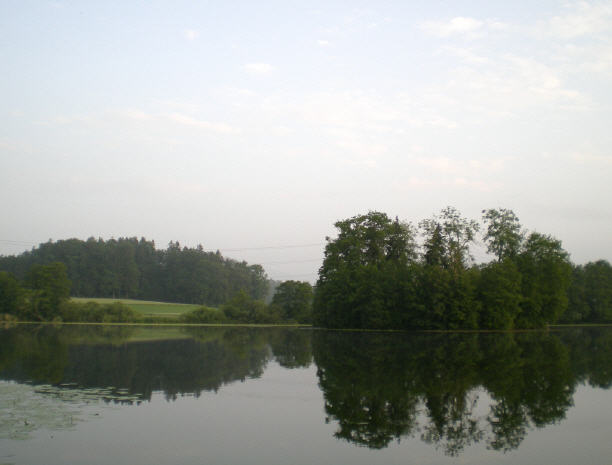

- Location within Canton of Solothurn Location within Canton of Bern Location within Switzerland Location within Alps
- Interactive map of Inkwilersee
- Location: Canton of Solothurn, Canton of Bern
- Coordinates: 47°11′53″N 7°39′43″E
- Primary outflows: Seebach
- Basin countries: Switzerland
- Max. length: 0.5 km (0.31 mi)
- Max. width: 0.3 km (0.19 mi)
- Surface area: 10.16 ha (25.1 acres)
- Average depth: 2.9 m (9 ft 6 in)
- Max. depth: 6 m (20 ft)
- Surface elevation: 461.2 m (1,513 ft)

Inkwilersee is a small lake on the border of the municipalities of Inkwil, canton of Bern, and Bolken, canton of Solothurn, Switzerland. Its surface area is 0.1016 km^{2} (25.1 acres).

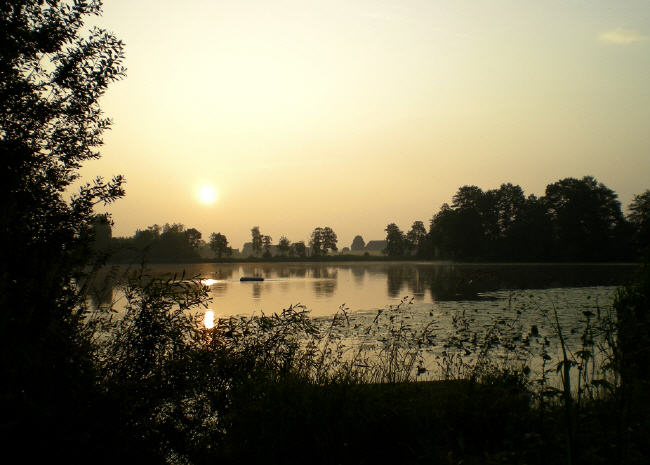
