= Etziken =

- Municipality
- Coat of arms
- Location of Etziken
- Location within Switzerland Location within Canton of Solothurn
- Coordinates: 47°11′N 7°39′E
- Country: Switzerland
- Canton: Solothurn
- District: Wasseramt

Area
  - Total: 3.38 km^{2} (1.31 sq mi)
- Elevation: 479 m (1,572 ft)

Population (December 2020)
  - Total: 973
  - Density: 288/km^{2} (746/sq mi)
- Time zone: UTC+01:00 (CET)
  - Summer (DST): UTC+02:00 (CEST)
- Postal code: 4554
- SFOS number: 2518
- ISO 3166 code: CH-SO
- Surrounded by: Aeschi, Bolken, Hersiwil, Horriwil, Hüniken, Subingen
- Website: http://etziken.ch SFSO statistics

Etziken is a municipality in the district of Wasseramt in the canton of Solothurn in Switzerland.

== History ==
Etziken is first mentioned in 1252 as Ezzinchon. In 1342 it was mentioned as Ertzenkon.

== Geography ==
Aerial view from 1000 m by Walter Mittelholzer (1923)

Etziken has an area, as of 2009, of 3.38 square kilometers (1.31 sq mi). Of this area, 1.82 km^{2} (0.70 sq mi) or 53.8% is used for agricultural purposes, while 1.09 km^{2} (0.42 sq mi) or 32.2% is forested. Of the rest of the land, 0.45 km^{2} (0.17 sq mi) or 13.3% is settled (buildings or roads), 0.01 km^{2} (2.5 acres) or 0.3% is either rivers or lakes and 0.01 km^{2} (2.5 acres) or 0.3% is unproductive land.

Of the built up area, housing and buildings made up 8.9% and transportation infrastructure made up 3.8%. Out of the forested land, all of the forested land area is covered with heavy forests. Of the agricultural land, 41.1% is used for growing crops and 11.8% is pastures. All the water in the municipality is flowing water.

The municipality is located in the Wasseramt district, on the Solothurn-Herzogenbuchsee in the hills created from a terminal moraine. It consists of the linear village of Etziken.

== Coat of arms ==
The blazon of the municipal coat of arms is Gules a Water Tower Argent issuant from a Mount of 3 Coupeaux Vert.

== Demographics ==
Etziken has a population (as of December 2020) of 973. As of 2008, 5.1% of the population are resident foreign nationals. Over the last 10 years (1999–2009 ) the population has changed at a rate of -7.1%. It has changed at a rate of -6.7% due to migration and at a rate of -0.6% due to births and deaths.

Most of the population (as of 2000) speaks German (755 or 96.4%), with French being second most common (6 or 0.8%) and Italian being third (5 or 0.6%).

As of 2008, the gender distribution of the population was 49.3% male and 50.7% female. The population was made up of 347 Swiss men (45.8% of the population) and 26 (3.4%) non-Swiss men. There were 365 Swiss women (48.2%) and 19 (2.5%) non-Swiss women. Of the population in the municipality 275 or about 35.1% were born in Etziken and lived there in 2000. There were 257 or 32.8% who were born in the same canton, while 189 or 24.1% were born somewhere else in Switzerland, and 41 or 5.2% were born outside of Switzerland.

In 2008 there were 4 live births to Swiss citizens and 1 birth to non-Swiss citizens, and in same time span there were 8 deaths of Swiss citizens. Ignoring immigration and emigration, the population of Swiss citizens decreased by 4 while the foreign population increased by 1. There was 1 Swiss man who emigrated from Switzerland and 1 Swiss woman who immigrated back to Switzerland. At the same time, there was 1 non-Swiss man and 3 non-Swiss women who immigrated from another country to Switzerland. The total Swiss population change in 2008 (from all sources, including moves across municipal borders) was a decrease of 6 and the non-Swiss population increased by 9 people. This represents a population growth rate of 0.4%.

The age distribution, as of 2000, in Etziken is; 59 children or 7.5% of the population are between 0 and 6 years old and 135 teenagers or 17.2% are between 7 and 19. Of the adult population, 36 people or 4.6% of the population are between 20 and 24 years old. 235 people or 30.0% are between 25 and 44, and 196 people or 25.0% are between 45 and 64. The senior population distribution is 85 people or 10.9% of the population are between 65 and 79 years old and there are 37 people or 4.7% who are over 80.

As of 2000, there were 310 people who were single and never married in the municipality. There were 399 married individuals, 48 widows or widowers and 26 individuals who are divorced.

As of 2000, there were 310 private households in the municipality, and an average of 2.5 persons per household. There were 81 households that consist of only one person and 16 households with five or more people. Out of a total of 315 households that answered this question, 25.7% were households made up of just one person and there were 4 adults who lived with their parents. Of the rest of the households, there are 93 married couples without children, 115 married couples with children There were 13 single parents with a child or children. There were 4 households that were made up of unrelated people and 5 households that were made up of some sort of institution or another collective housing.

In 2000 there were 154 single family homes (or 67.5% of the total) out of a total of 228 inhabited buildings. There were 30 multi-family buildings (13.2%), along with 35 multi-purpose buildings that were mostly used for housing (15.4%) and 9 other use buildings (commercial or industrial) that also had some housing (3.9%). Of the single family homes 22 were built before 1919, while 31 were built between 1990 and 2000. The greatest number of single family homes (31) were built between 1981 and 1990.

In 2000 there were 332 apartments in the municipality. The most common apartment size was 5 rooms of which there were 91. There were 2 single room apartments and 154 apartments with five or more rooms. Of these apartments, a total of 302 apartments (91.0% of the total) were permanently occupied, while 21 apartments (6.3%) were seasonally occupied and 9 apartments (2.7%) were empty. As of 2009, the construction rate of new housing units was 0 new units per 1000 residents. The vacancy rate for the municipality, in 2010, was 3.89%.

The historical population is given in the following chart:

== Politics ==
In the 2007 federal election the most popular party was the CVP which received 30.9% of the vote. The next three most popular parties were the SVP (26.03%), the FDP (18.9%) and the SP (15.54%). In the federal election, a total of 324 votes were cast, and the voter turnout was 52.3%.

== Economy ==
As of 2010, Etziken had an unemployment rate of 2.7%. As of 2008, there were 38 people employed in the primary economic sector and about 14 businesses involved in this sector. 391 people were employed in the secondary sector and there were 18 businesses in this sector. 66 people were employed in the tertiary sector, with 19 businesses in this sector. There were 421 residents of the municipality who were employed in some capacity, of which females made up 43.7% of the workforce.

In 2008 the total number of full-time equivalent jobs was 438. The number of jobs in the primary sector was 22, all of which were in agriculture. The number of jobs in the secondary sector was 369 of which 356 or (96.5%) were in manufacturing and 10 (2.7%) were in construction. The number of jobs in the tertiary sector was 47. In the tertiary sector; 14 or 29.8% were in wholesale or retail sales or the repair of motor vehicles, 5 or 10.6% were in the movement and storage of goods, 3 or 6.4% were in a hotel or restaurant, 3 or 6.4% were the insurance or financial industry, 8 or 17.0% were technical professionals or scientists, 3 or 6.4% were in education and 6 or 12.8% were in health care.

In 2000, there were 256 workers who commuted into the municipality and 297 workers who commuted away. The municipality is a net exporter of workers, with about 1.2 workers leaving the municipality for every one entering. Of the working population, 10.2% used public transportation to get to work, and 61.5% used a private car.

== Religion ==
From the 2000 census, 397 or 50.7% were Roman Catholic, while 274 or 35.0% belonged to the Swiss Reformed Church. Of the rest of the population, there was 1 member of an Orthodox church who belonged, there were 5 individuals (or about 0.64% of the population) who belonged to the Christian Catholic Church, and there were 15 individuals (or about 1.92% of the population) who belonged to another Christian church. There were 2 (or about 0.26% of the population) who were Islamic. There were 2 individuals who were Buddhist and 3 individuals who were Hindu. 71 (or about 9.07% of the population) belonged to no church, are agnostic or atheist, and 13 individuals (or about 1.66% of the population) did not answer the question.

== Education ==
In Etziken about 319 or (40.7%) of the population have completed non-mandatory upper secondary education, and 85 or (10.9%) have completed additional higher education (either university or a Fachhochschule). Of the 85 who completed tertiary schooling, 75.3% were Swiss men, 20.0% were Swiss women.

As of 2000, there were 12 students in Etziken who came from another municipality, while 47 residents attended schools outside the municipality.
