= Hüniken =

- Municipality
- Coat of arms
- Location of Hüniken
- Location within Switzerland Location within Canton of Solothurn
- Coordinates: 47°11′N 7°38′E
- Country: Switzerland
- Canton: Solothurn
- District: Wasseramt

Area
  - Total: 1.01 km^{2} (0.39 sq mi)
- Elevation: 471 m (1,545 ft)

Population (December 2020)
  - Total: 153
  - Density: 151/km^{2} (392/sq mi)
- Time zone: UTC+01:00 (CET)
  - Summer (DST): UTC+02:00 (CEST)
- Postal code: 4554
- SFOS number: 2524
- ISO 3166 code: CH-SO
- Surrounded by: Etziken, Horriwil, Subingen
- Website: www.hueniken.ch/

Hüniken is a municipality in the district of Wasseramt in the canton of Solothurn in Switzerland.

== History ==
Hüniken is first mentioned around 1263-64 as P. de Hunnechoven.

== Geography ==
Hüniken has an area, as of 2009, of 1.01 square kilometers (0.39 sq mi). Of this area, 0.78 km^{2} (0.30 sq mi) or 77.2% is used for agricultural purposes, while 0.16 km^{2} (0.062 sq mi) or 15.8% is forested. Of the rest of the land, 0.07 km^{2} (17 acres) or 6.9% is settled (buildings or roads).

Of the built up area, housing and buildings made up 5.0% and transportation infrastructure made up 2.0%. Out of the forested land, all of the forested land area is covered with heavy forests. Of the agricultural land, 55.4% is used for growing crops and 19.8% is pastures, while 2.0% is used for orchards or vine crops.

The municipality is located in the Wasseramt district, on a ground moraine. The houses are scattered around the Chapel of St. Michael and stretch toward Etziken.

== Coat of arms ==
The blazon of the municipal coat of arms is Gules a Fir Tree issuant from a Mount of 3 Coupeaux Vert.

== Demographics ==
Hüniken has a population (as of December 2020) of 153, all Swiss citizens. Over the last 10 years (1999–2009 ) the population has changed at a rate of 26.5%. It has changed at a rate of 20.6% due to migration and at a rate of 1.5% due to births and deaths.

Most of the population (as of 2000) speaks German (66 or 98.5%) with the rest speaking English

As of 2008, the gender distribution of the population was 46.5% male and 53.5% female. The population was made up of 40 Swiss men (46.5% of the population) and (0.0%) non-Swiss men. There were 46 Swiss women (53.5%) and (0.0%) non-Swiss women. Of the population in the municipality 37 or about 55.2% were born in Hüniken and lived there in 2000. There were 21 or 31.3% who were born in the same canton, while 8 or 11.9% were born somewhere else in Switzerland, and 1 or 1.5% were born outside of Switzerland.

In 2008, from births and deaths, the population of Swiss citizens and the foreign population remained the same. The total Swiss population change in 2008 (from all sources, including moves across municipal borders) was a decrease of 3 and the non-Swiss population remained the same. This represents a population growth rate of -3.3%.

The age distribution, as of 2000, in Hüniken is; 4 children or 6.0% of the population are between 0 and 6 years old and 8 teenagers or 11.9% are between 7 and 19. Of the adult population, 5 people or 7.5% of the population are between 20 and 24 years old. 14 people or 20.9% are between 25 and 44, and 21 people or 31.3% are between 45 and 64.

As of 2000, there were 26 people who were single and never married in the municipality. There were 35 married individuals, 3 widows or widowers and 3 individuals who are divorced.

As of 2000, there were 26 private households in the municipality, and an average of 2.6 persons per household. There were 6 households that consist of only one person and 2 households with five or more people. Out of a total of 26 households that answered this question, 23.1% were households made up of just one person. Of the rest of the households, there are 8 married couples without children, 11 married couples with children There was one single parent with a child or children.

In 2000 there were 12 single-family homes (or 52.2% of the total) out of a total of 23 inhabited buildings. There were 2 multi-family buildings (8.7%) and along with 9 multi-purpose buildings that were mostly used for housing (39.1%). Of the single-family homes 1 was built before 1919, while 1 was built between 1990 and 2000. The greatest number of single-family homes (4) were built between 1971 and 1980.

In 2000 there were 28 apartments in the municipality. The most common apartment size was 5 rooms of which there were 10. There were no single room apartments and 17 apartments with five or more rooms. Of these apartments, a total of 26 apartments (92.9% of the total) were permanently occupied, while 2 apartments (7.1%) were empty. As of 2009, the construction rate of new housing units was 23.3 new units per 1000 residents. The vacancy rate for the municipality, in 2010, was 0%.

The historical population is given in the following chart:

== Politics ==
In the 2007 federal election the most popular party was the CVP which received 34.29% of the vote. The next three most popular parties were the SP (22.51%), the FDP (20.94%) and the Green Party (12.3%). In the federal election, a total of 57 votes were cast, and the voter turnout was 73.1%.

== Economy ==
As of 2010, Hüniken had an unemployment rate of 3.6%. As of 2008, there were 9 people employed in the primary economic sector and about 3 businesses involved in this sector. 1 person was employed in the secondary sector and there was 1 business in this sector. There were no jobs in the municipality in the tertiary sector. There were 44 residents of the municipality who were employed in some capacity, of which females made up 36.4% of the workforce.

In 2008 the total number of full-time equivalent jobs was 6. The number of jobs in the primary sector was 5, all of which were in agriculture. There was 1 job in the secondary sector, in manufacturing. In 2000, there were 29 workers who commuted away from the municipality. Of the working population, 13.6% used public transportation to get to work, and 45.5% used a private car.

== Religion ==
From the 2000 census, 46 or 68.7% were Roman Catholic, while 15 or 22.4% belonged to the Swiss Reformed Church. Of the rest of the population, there were 4 individuals (or about 5.97% of the population) who belonged to the Christian Catholic Church and 2 (or about 2.99% of the population) who belonged to no church, are agnostic or atheist.

== Education ==
In Hüniken about 36 or (53.7%) of the population have completed non-mandatory upper secondary education, and 9 or (13.4%) have completed additional higher education (either university or a Fachhochschule). Of the 9 who completed tertiary schooling, 77.8% were Swiss men, 22.2% were Swiss women.

As of 2000, there were 6 students from Hüniken who attended schools outside the municipality.
