= Paita District =

Coordinates: 5.0851°S 81.1137°W

Paita
- District
- Interactive map of Paita
- Country: Peru
- Region: Piura
- Province: Paita
- Capital: Paita

Government
  - Mayor: Teodoro Edilberto Alvarado Alayo

Area
  - Total: 763.68 km^{2} (294.86 sq mi)
- Elevation: 3 m (9.8 ft)

Population (2017)
  - Total: 87,979
  - Density: 115.20/km^{2} (298.38/sq mi)
- Time zone: UTC-5 (PET)
- UBIGEO: 200501

Paita District is one of seven districts of the province Paita in Peru.
