= Tamarindo District =

Coordinates: 4.8781°S 80.9758°W

Tamarindo
- District
- Interactive map of Tamarindo
- Country: Peru
- Region: Piura
- Province: Paita
- Founded: August 28, 1920
- Capital: Tamarindo

Government
  - Mayor: Hernan Farias Medina

Area
  - Total: 63.67 km^{2} (24.58 sq mi)
- Elevation: 17 m (56 ft)

Population (2005 census)
  - Total: 4,253
  - Density: 66.80/km^{2} (173.0/sq mi)
- Time zone: UTC-5 (PET)
- UBIGEO: 200506

Tamarindo District is one of seven districts of the province Paita in Peru.
