= La Huaca District =

Coordinates: 4.9100°S 80.9617°W

La Huaca
- District
- Interactive map of La Huaca
- Country: Peru
- Region: Piura
- Province: Paita
- Capital: La Huaca

Government
  - Mayor: Juan Carlos Acaro Talledo

Area
  - Total: 599.51 km^{2} (231.47 sq mi)
- Elevation: 22 m (72 ft)

Population (2005 census)
  - Total: 10,594
  - Density: 17.671/km^{2} (45.768/sq mi)
- Time zone: UTC-5 (PET)
- UBIGEO: 200505

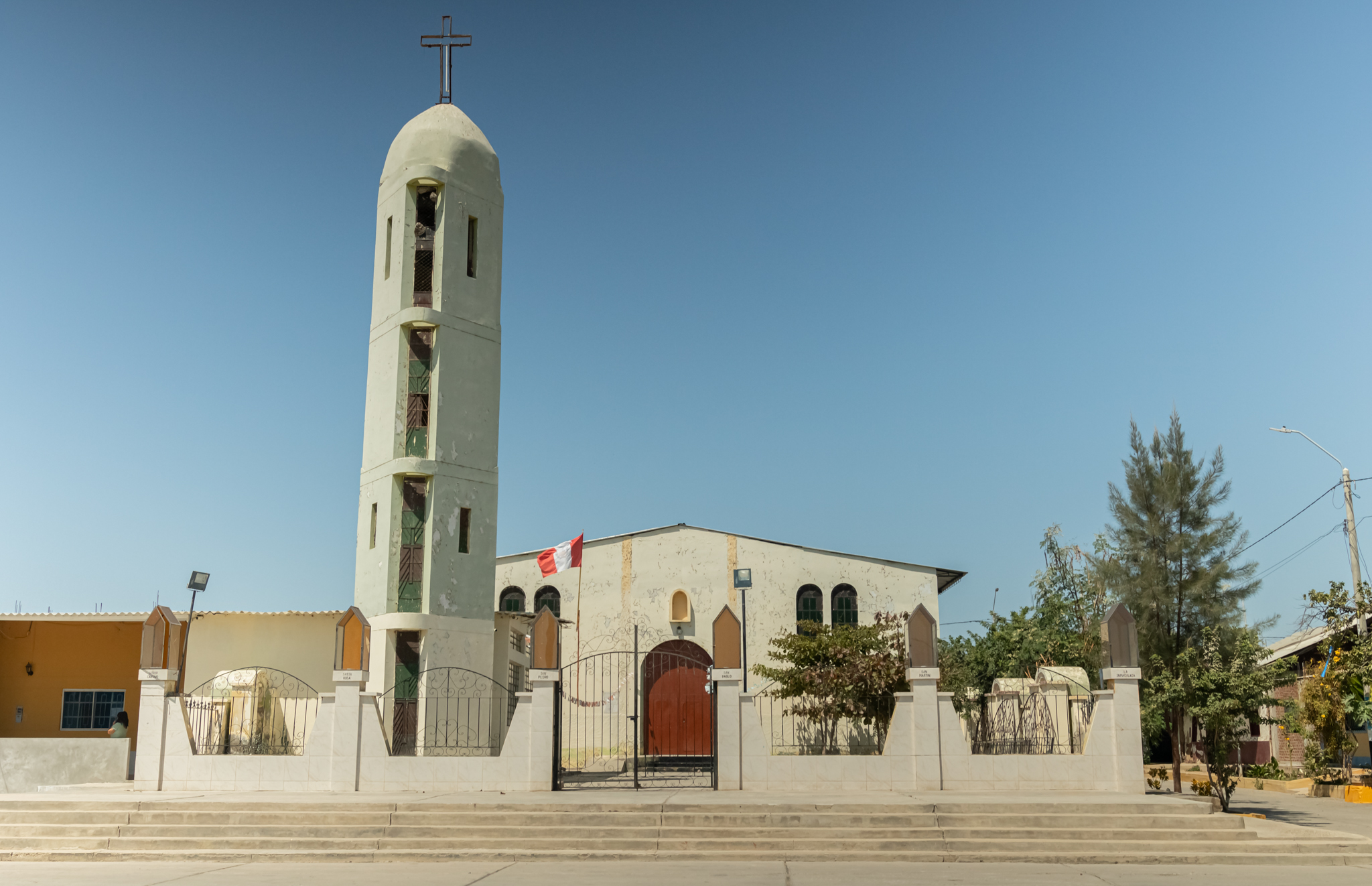
Santa Ana de La Huaca Parish, Paita, Piura

La Huaca District is one of seven districts of the province Paita in Peru.
