= Paita province =

Coordinates: 5°05′34″S 81°06′07″W

Paita
- Province
- Flag

- Location of Paita in the Piura Region
- Country: Peru
- Region: Piura
- Founded: March 20, 1861
- Capital: Paita

Government
  - Mayor: Teodoro Edilberto Alvarado Alayo

Area
  - Total: 1,785.16 km^{2} (689.25 sq mi)

Population
  - Total: 129,892
  - Density: 72.7621/km^{2} (188.453/sq mi)
- UBIGEO: 2005
- Website: www.munipaita.gob.pe

Paita is one of eight provinces of the Piura Region in northwestern Peru.

== Location ==
The province is located along the pacific coast. Its capital city, Paita, is one of the main ports of Peru.

=== Boundaries ===
- North: provinces of Talara and Sullana
- East: province of Sullana
- South: province of Piura
- West Sea of Grau.

== Political division ==
The province is divided into seven districts, which are:

- Paita
- Amotape
- Colan
- La Huaca
- Vichayal
- Arenal
- Tamarindo

== Capital ==
The capital of the province is the city of Paita.

== See also ==
- Piura Region
- Peru
