= Vichayal District =

Coordinates: 4°51′55″S 81°04′19″W

Vichayal
- District
- Interactive map of Vichayal
- Country: Peru
- Region: Piura
- Province: Paita
- Founded: August 28, 1920
- Capital: San Felipe de Vichayal

Government
  - Mayor: Genaro Cruz Julian

Area
  - Total: 134.36 km^{2} (51.88 sq mi)
- Elevation: 40 m (130 ft)

Population (2005 census)
  - Total: 5,222
  - Density: 38.87/km^{2} (100.7/sq mi)
- Time zone: UTC-5 (PET)
- UBIGEO: 200507

Vichayal District is one of seven districts of the province Paita in Peru.
