= Colan District =

Colan
- District
- Location within Peru
- Coordinates: 5.0063°S 81.0589°W
- Country: Peru
- Region: Piura
- Province: Paita
- Founded: October 8, 1840
- Capital: San Lucas

Government
  - Mayor: Pascual Vilchez Carcamo

Area
  - Total: 124.93 km^{2} (48.24 sq mi)
- Elevation: 45 m (148 ft)

Population (2005 census)
  - Total: 12,298
  - Density: 98.439/km^{2} (254.96/sq mi)
- Time zone: UTC-5 (PET)
- UBIGEO: 200504

Colan District (Spanish: Distrito de Colán) is one of seven districts of the province Paita in Peru.

== Climate ==
Climate data for La Esperanza, Colan, elevation 7 m (23 ft), (1991–2020)
| Month | Jan | Feb | Mar | Apr | May | Jun | Jul | Aug | Sep | Oct | Nov | Dec | Year |
|---|---|---|---|---|---|---|---|---|---|---|---|---|---|
| Mean daily maximum °C (°F) | 30.3 (86.5) | 31.4 (88.5) | 31.4 (88.5) | 30.9 (87.6) | 29.4 (84.9) | 27.3 (81.1) | 26.1 (79.0) | 25.5 (77.9) | 25.9 (78.6) | 26.1 (79.0) | 26.7 (80.1) | 28.6 (83.5) | 28.3 (82.9) |
| Mean daily minimum °C (°F) | 22.1 (71.8) | 23.3 (73.9) | 23.2 (73.8) | 22.0 (71.6) | 20.5 (68.9) | 19.2 (66.6) | 18.0 (64.4) | 17.5 (63.5) | 17.6 (63.7) | 17.9 (64.2) | 18.6 (65.5) | 20.3 (68.5) | 20.0 (68.0) |
| Average precipitation mm (inches) | 12.8 (0.50) | 23.5 (0.93) | 30.5 (1.20) | 7.2 (0.28) | 1.1 (0.04) | 0.8 (0.03) | 0.1 (0.00) | 0.0 (0.0) | 0.1 (0.00) | 0.3 (0.01) | 0.4 (0.02) | 4.6 (0.18) | 81.4 (3.19) |
Source: National Meteorology and Hydrology Service of Peru

== See also ==
- Colán dialect of Tallán
