= Albert Steffen =

Swiss writer (1884-1963)

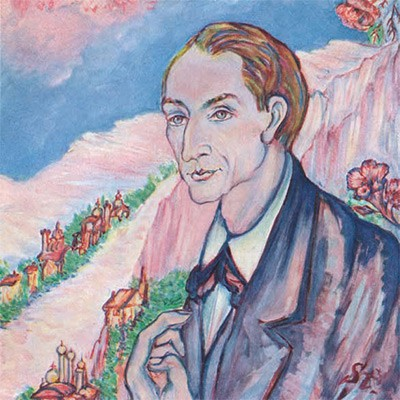
- Born: 10 December 1884; Wynau, Switzerland
- Died: 13 July 1963 (aged 78); Dornach, Switzerland
- Occupations: Poet, artist

Albert Steffen (10 December 1884, Wynau, Switzerland – 13 July 1963, Dornach, Switzerland) was a poet, painter, dramatist, essayist, and novelist. He joined the Theosophical Society in Germany in 1910, and the Anthroposophical Society in 1912 and became its president after the death of its founder, Rudolf Steiner, in 1925. Steffen was chief editor of the society's journal, Das Goetheanum, from 1921 to 1963.

Steffen wrote many plays (Hiram and Solomon, Manes' Experience of Death), novels (Oasis of Humanity, The Renewal of the Association), and essays (The Artist Between West and East). Other than a volume of poetry published with the American poet Percy MacKaye, containing both of their poetry translated by each other, few of his works have appeared in English.

His earliest works, predating his encounter with anthroposophy, already manifest a spiritual awareness. His later works, which reflect a vision of the world permeated by metaphysical powers of good and evil, draw on a wide range of esoteric European and Asian traditions.
