= Schwarzhäusern =

- Municipality
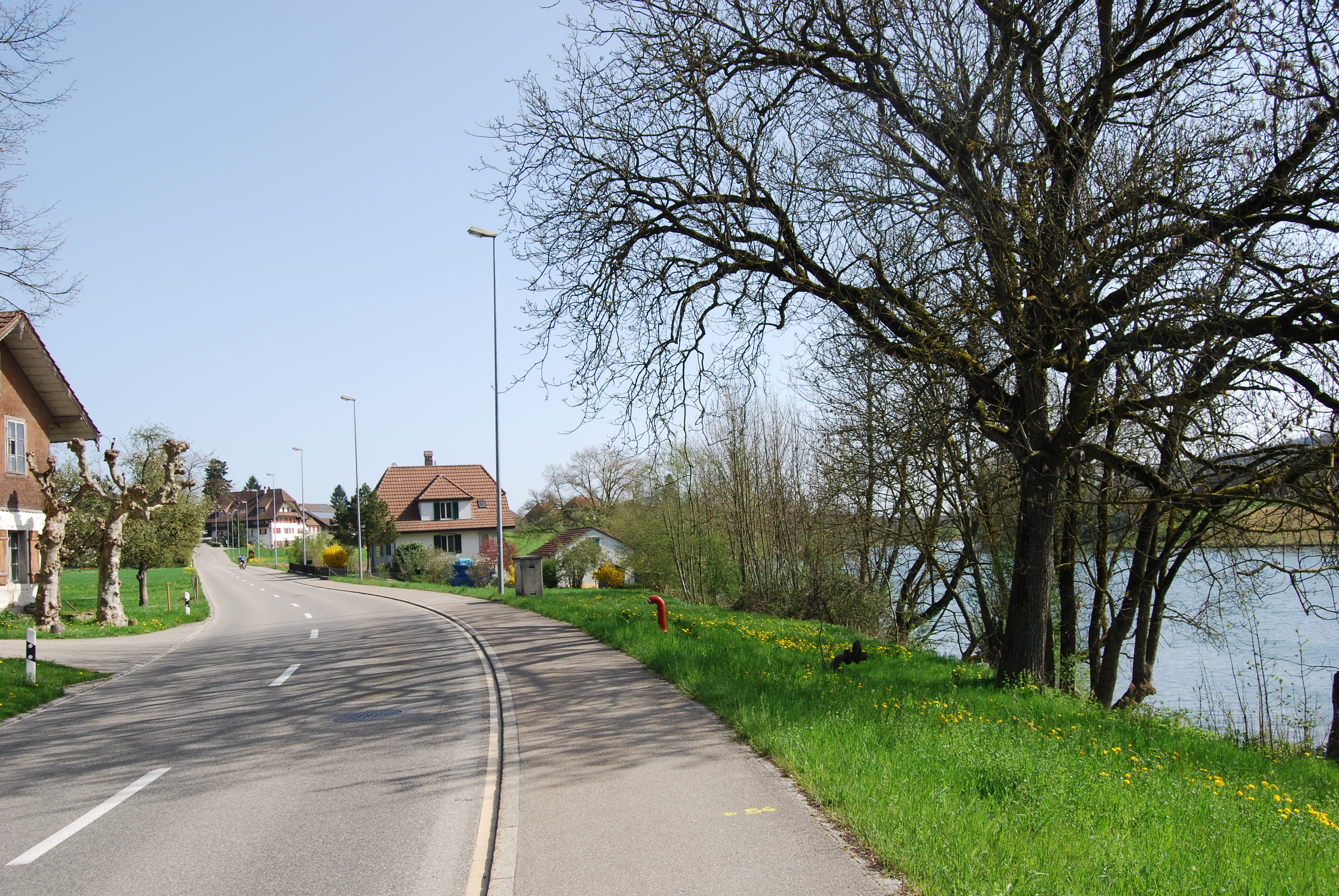

- Flag Coat of arms
- Location of Schwarzhäusern
- Location within Switzerland Location within Canton of Bern
- Coordinates: 47°15′N 7°46′E
- Country: Switzerland
- Canton: Bern
- District: Oberaargau

Area
  - Total: 3.7 km^{2} (1.4 sq mi)
- Elevation: 427 m (1,401 ft)

Population (December 2020)
  - Total: 533
  - Density: 140/km^{2} (370/sq mi)
- Time zone: UTC+01:00 (CET)
  - Summer (DST): UTC+02:00 (CEST)
- Postal code: 4911
- SFOS number: 341
- ISO 3166 code: CH-BE
- Surrounded by: Wolfwil, Wynau, Aarwangen, Bannwil, Niederbipp, Kestenholz
- Website: www.schwarzhaeusern.ch

Schwarzhäusern is a municipality in the Oberaargau administrative district in the canton of Bern in Switzerland.

== History ==
Originally it was known as Rufshausen and that name was first recorded in 1100 as Rudolfshausen. It was first mentioned in 1677 as Schwartzenheüßeren, a name that would become Schwarzhäusern.

Several Mesolithic or Neolithic flint tools have been found in sites around the municipality. There are several early medieval graves at Klebenrain. By the 13th century, a bridge was built over the Aare river, which connected the village to regional center of power in Aarwangen. In 1432, Aarwangen came under Bernese power and brought neighboring Schwarzhäusern with it. For a few decades, Bern and Solothurn shared authority over the parish of Niederbipp, which included Schwarzhäusern. However, in 1463, it came completely under Bern's control. Following the 1798 French invasion, under the Helvetic Republic it became part of the District of Wangen. Schwarzhäusern remained in the Wangen district until 1871, when it joined the Aarwangen district.

During the 17th and 18th centuries cottage industry weaving began to supplement agriculture in the local economy. During the 19th century, as agriculture became increasingly mechanized and required fewer workers, many residents were forced to emigrate to find work. At the beginning of the 21st century, agriculture and small businesses provide only 17% of the jobs in the municipality and about three-quarters of the workers commute to nearby towns for work. It shares an upper secondary school with Bannwil and Aarwangen and a Gymnasium with Langenthal.

== Geography ==
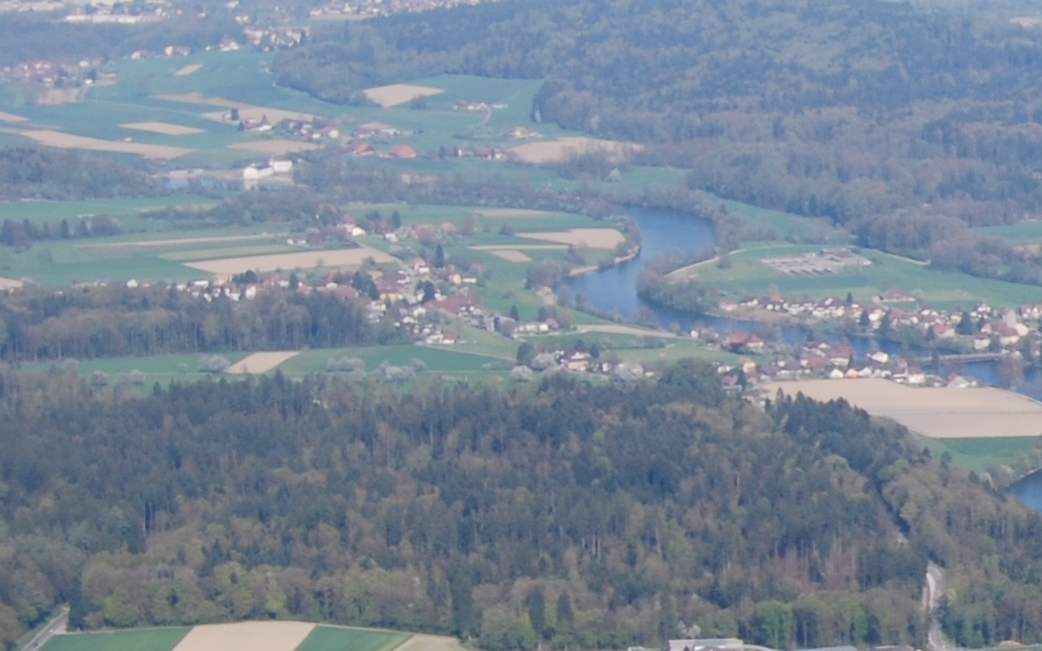
Aerial view of Schwarzhäusern, showing the Aare river

Schwarzhäusern has an area of 3.79 km^{2} (1.46 sq mi). Of this area, 1.97 km^{2} (0.76 mi^{2}) or 52.0% is used for agricultural purposes, while 1.28 km^{2} (0.49 mi^{2}) or 33.8% is forested. Of the rest of the land, 0.39 km^{2} (0.15 mi^{2}) or 10.3% is settled (buildings or roads), 0.11 km^{2} (27 acres) or 2.9% is either rivers or lakes.

Of the built up area, housing and buildings made up 5.8% and transportation infrastructure made up 3.4%. Power and water infrastructure as well as other special developed areas made up 1.1% of the area Out of the forested land, 31.7% of the total land area is heavily forested and 2.1% is covered with orchards or small clusters of trees. Of the agricultural land, 40.9% is used for growing crops and 10.6% is pastures. All the water in the municipality is flowing water.

Schwarzhäusern lies in the Oberaargau in the Swiss Plateau on the left bank of the Aare and the border with the Canton of Solothurn. It consists of the village of Schwarzhäusern and the hamlets of Rufshusen and Moosbach as well as scattered farm houses.

At the southern end of the municipality the Aare has a reservoir created by the hydroelectric plant of Wynau.

On 31 December 2009 Amtsbezirk Aarwangen, the municipality's former district, was dissolved. On the following day, 1 January 2010, it joined the newly created Verwaltungskreis Oberaargau.

== Coat of arms ==
The blazon of the municipal coat of arms is Argent on a Base Vert two Houses Sable and in chief a Mullet Azure. This is an example of canting with two black (German: Schwartz) houses (German: häusern).

== Demographics ==
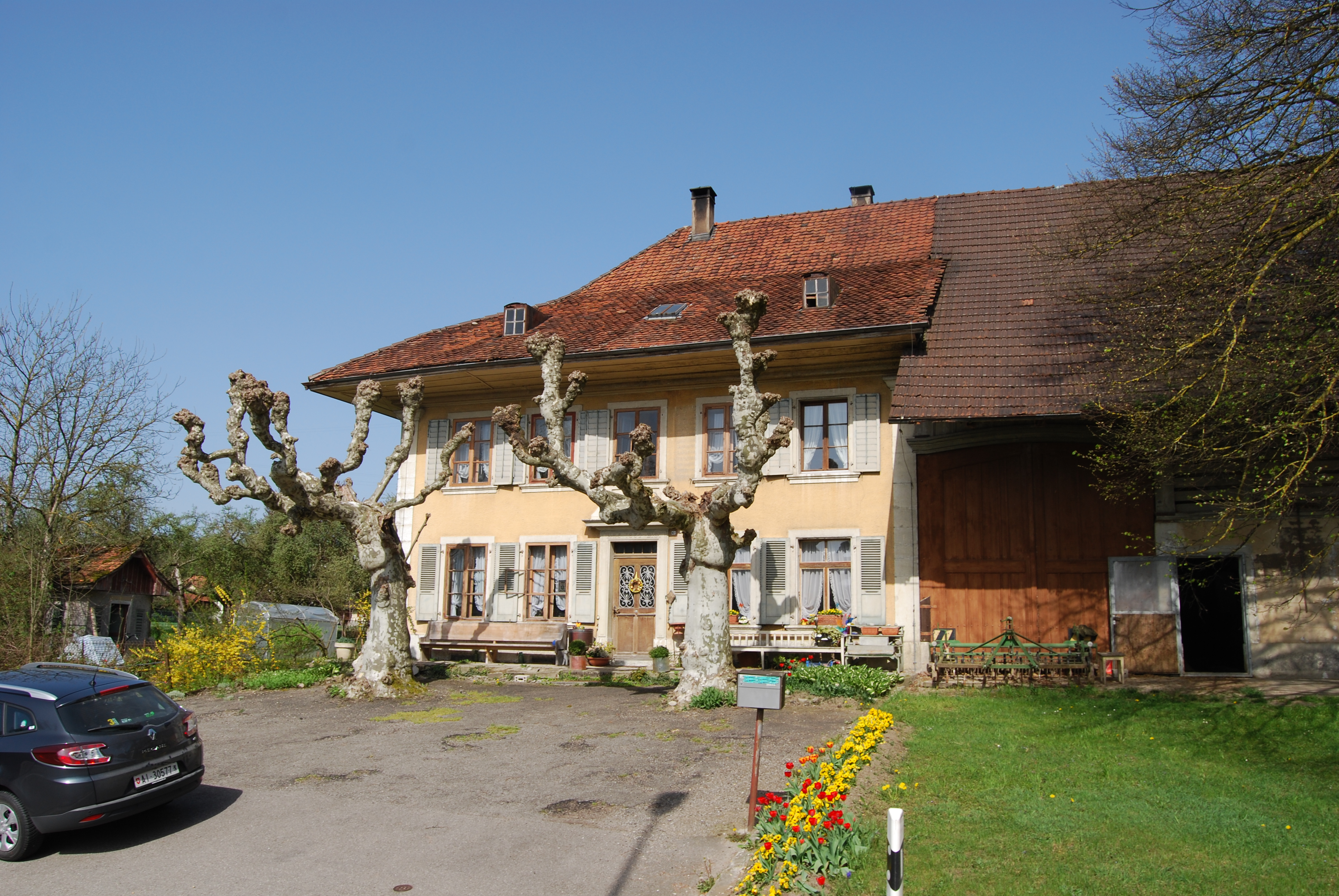
House in Schwarzhäusern

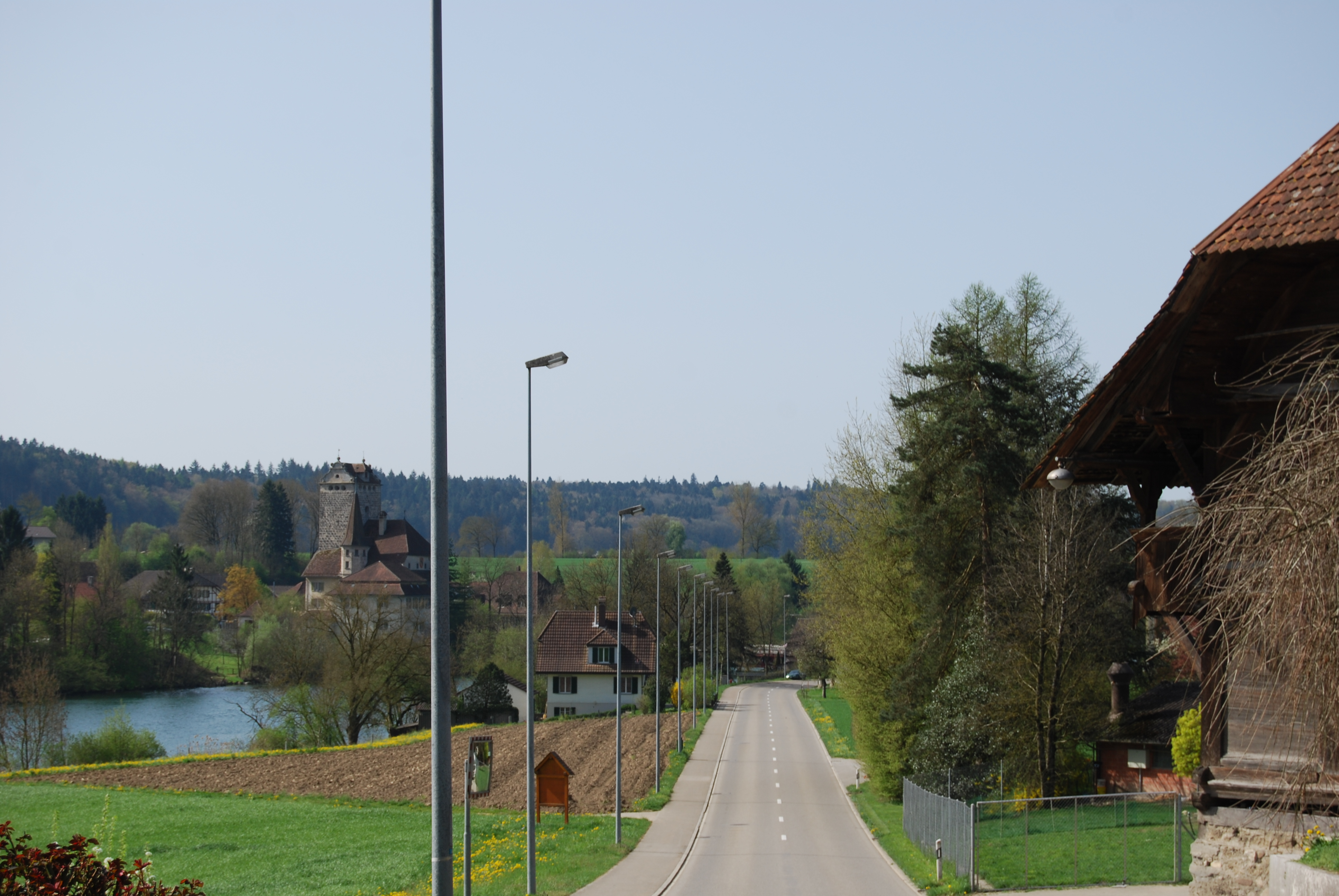
Aarwangen Castle seen from across the river in Schwarzhäusern

Schwarzhäusern has a population (as of December 2020) of 533. As of 2010, 2.9% of the population are resident foreign nationals. Over the last 10 years (2000-2010) the population has changed at a rate of 9.8%. Migration accounted for 5.7%, while births and deaths accounted for 0.5%.

Most of the population (as of 2000) speaks German (427 or 97.5%) as their first language, French is the second most common (4 or 0.9%) and Serbo-Croatian is the third (4 or 0.9%). There is 1 person who speaks Italian.

As of 2008, the population was 50.4% male and 49.6% female. The population was made up of 231 Swiss men (48.1% of the population) and 11 (2.3%) non-Swiss men. There were 235 Swiss women (49.0%) and 3 (0.6%) non-Swiss women. Of the population in the municipality, 152 or about 34.7% were born in Schwarzhäusern and lived there in 2000. There were 162 or 37.0% who were born in the same canton, while 91 or 20.8% were born somewhere else in Switzerland, and 25 or 5.7% were born outside of Switzerland.

As of 2010, children and teenagers (0–19 years old) make up 23.3% of the population, while adults (20–64 years old) make up 59% and seniors (over 64 years old) make up 17.7%.

As of 2000, there were 167 people who were single and never married in the municipality. There were 218 married individuals, 27 widows or widowers and 26 individuals who are divorced.

As of 2000, there were 46 households that consist of only one person and 10 households with five or more people. In 2000, a total of 175 apartments (95.1% of the total) were permanently occupied, while 3 apartments (1.6%) were seasonally occupied and 6 apartments (3.3%) were empty. As of 2010, the construction rate of new housing units was 2.1 new units per 1000 residents.

The historical population is given in the following chart:

== Politics ==
In the 2011 federal election the most popular party was the SVP which received 44.5% of the vote. The next three most popular parties were the SPS (15.2%), the BDP Party (13.1%) and the Green Party (5.8%). In the federal election, a total of 208 votes were cast, and the voter turnout was 55.3%.

== Economy ==
As of 2011, Schwarzhäusern had an unemployment rate of 1.55%. As of 2008, there were a total of 105 people employed in the municipality. Of these, there were 18 people employed in the primary economic sector and about 8 businesses involved in this sector. 23 people were employed in the secondary sector and there were 6 businesses in this sector. 64 people were employed in the tertiary sector, with 10 businesses in this sector.

In 2008 there were a total of 88 full-time equivalent jobs. The number of jobs in the primary sector was 13, all of which were in agriculture. The number of jobs in the secondary sector was 21 of which 20 or (95.2%) were in manufacturing and 1 was in construction. The number of jobs in the tertiary sector was 54. In the tertiary sector; 45 or 83.3% were in wholesale or retail sales or the repair of motor vehicles, 2 or 3.7% were in the movement and storage of goods, 3 or 5.6% were in a hotel or restaurant, 1 was a technical professional or scientist, 1 was in education.

In 2000, there were 37 workers who commuted into the municipality and 179 workers who commuted away. The municipality is a net exporter of workers, with about 4.8 workers leaving the municipality for every one entering. Of the working population, 8% used public transportation to get to work, and 65.1% used a private car.

== Religion ==
From the 2000 census, 45 or 10.3% were Roman Catholic, while 362 or 82.6% belonged to the Swiss Reformed Church. Of the rest of the population, there were 4 members of an Orthodox church (or about 0.91% of the population), and there were 14 individuals (or about 3.20% of the population) who belonged to another Christian church. There was 1 individual who was Islamic. 12 (or about 2.74% of the population) belonged to no church, are agnostic or atheist, and 7 individuals (or about 1.60% of the population) did not answer the question.

== Education ==
In Schwarzhäusern about 208 or (47.5%) of the population have completed non-mandatory upper secondary education, and 40 or (9.1%) have completed additional higher education (either university or a Fachhochschule). Of the 40 who completed tertiary schooling, 62.5% were Swiss men, 32.5% were Swiss women.

The Canton of Bern school system provides one year of non-obligatory Kindergarten, followed by six years of Primary school. This is followed by three years of obligatory lower Secondary school where the students are separated according to ability and aptitude. Following the lower Secondary students may attend additional schooling or they may enter an apprenticeship.

During the 2009-10 school year, there were a total of 74 students attending classes in Schwarzhäusern. There was one kindergarten class with a total of 14 students in the municipality. The municipality had 2 primary classes and 36 students. During the same year, there was one lower secondary class with a total of 24 students. There were 4.2% who were permanent or temporary residents of Switzerland (not citizens) and 4.2% have a different mother language than the classroom language.

As of 2000, there were 9 students in Schwarzhäusern who came from another municipality, while 18 residents attended schools outside the municipality.
