= Gäu District =

Coordinates: 47.288888°N 7.7139°E

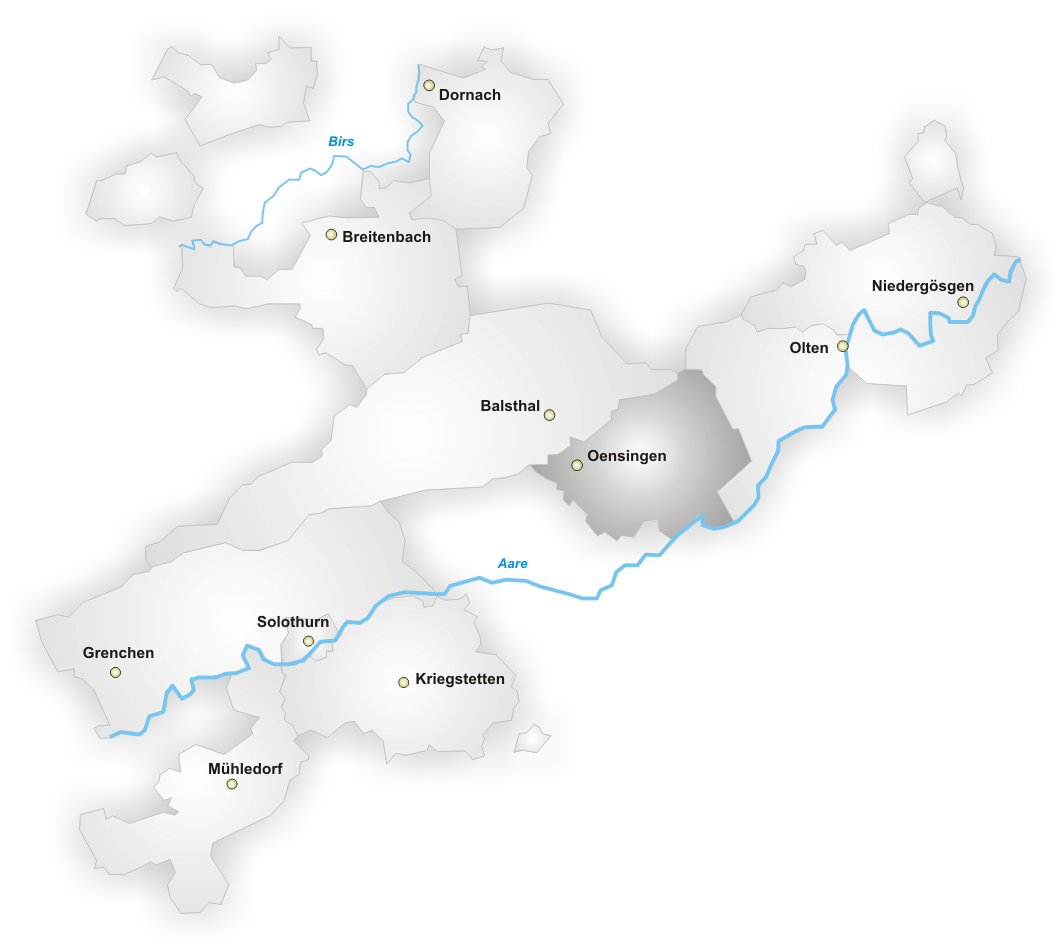
Gäu District, canton of Solothurn

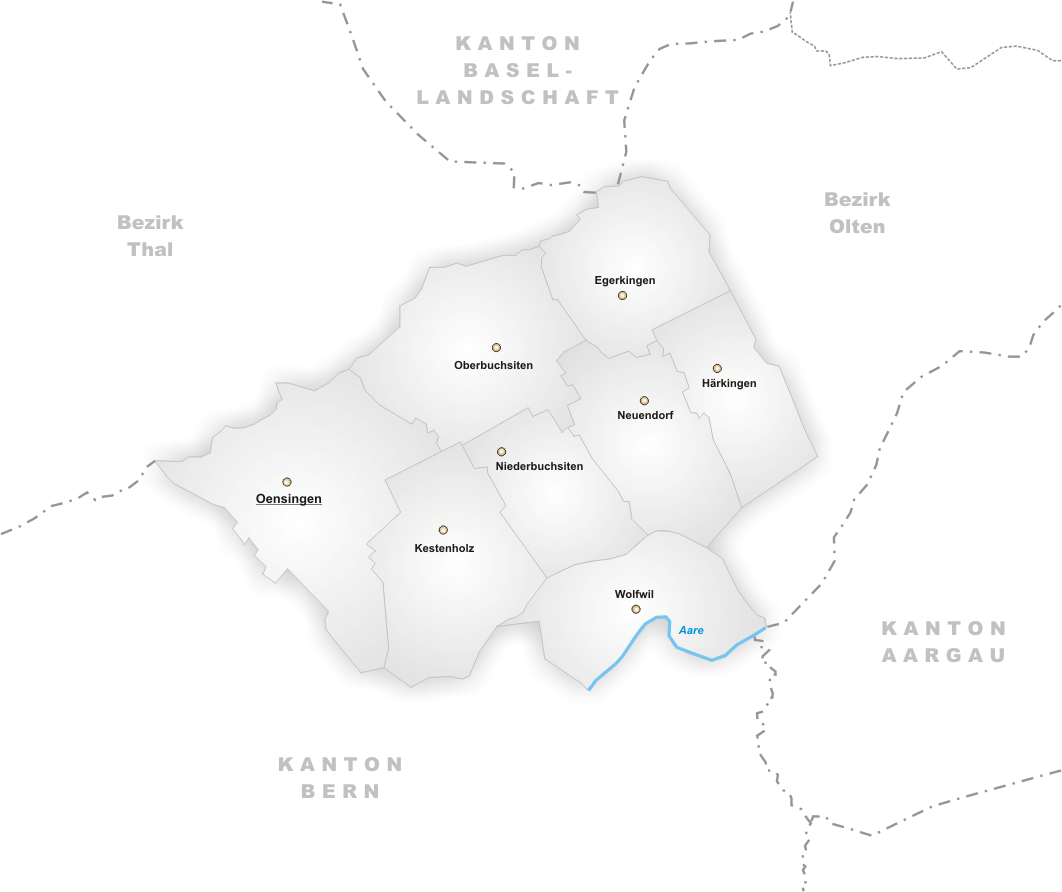
Municipalities of Gäu District

Gäu District is one of the ten districts of the canton of Solothurn in Switzerland, situated in the centre of the canton. It has a population of 22,005 (as of 31 December 2020). Together with Thal District, it forms the Amtei (electoral district) of Thal-Gäu.

== Municipalities ==
Gäu District contains the following municipalities:

Coat of arms	Municipality	Population (31 December 2020)	Area, km^{2}
Egerkingen	Egerkingen	4,041	6.93
Härkingen	Härkingen	1,644	5.57
Kestenholz	Kestenholz	1,848	8.59
Neuendorf	Neuendorf	2,277	7.13
Niederbuchsiten	Niederbuchsiten	1,260	5.49
Oberbuchsiten	Oberbuchsiten	2,296	9.39
Oensingen	Oensingen	6,276	12.03
Wolfwil	Wolfwil	2,363	6.89
	Total	22,005	62.02

== Geography ==
Gäu has an area, as of 2009, of 62.01 square kilometers (23.94 sq mi). Of this area, 27.74 km^{2} (10.71 sq mi) or 44.7% is used for agricultural purposes, while 23.36 km^{2} (9.02 sq mi) or 37.7% is forested. Of the rest of the land, 10.41 km^{2} (4.02 sq mi) or 16.8% is settled (buildings or roads), 0.44 km^{2} (0.17 sq mi) or 0.7% is either rivers or lakes and 0.06 km^{2} (15 acres) or 0.1% is unproductive land.

Of the built up area, industrial buildings made up 3.1% of the total area while housing and buildings made up 6.6% and transportation infrastructure made up 5.0%. Power and water infrastructure as well as other special developed areas made up 1.5% of the area Out of the forested land, 36.4% of the total land area is heavily forested and 1.2% is covered with orchards or small clusters of trees. Of the agricultural land, 41.9% is used for growing crops, while 1.2% is used for orchards or vine crops and 1.6% is used for alpine pastures. All the water in the district is flowing water.

== Coat of arms ==
The blazon of the municipal coat of arms is Tierced per fess Gules Argent and Sable.

== Demographics ==
Gäu has a population (as of December 2020) of 22,005.

Most of the population (as of 2000) speaks German (15,113 or 90.3%), with Albanian being second most common (353 or 2.1%) and Serbo-Croatian being third (309 or 1.8%). There are 82 people who speak French and 7 people who speak Romansh.

As of 2008, the gender distribution of the population was 50.5% male and 49.5% female. The population was made up of 7,235 Swiss men (40.2% of the population) and 1,856 (10.3%) non-Swiss men. There were 7,356 Swiss women (40.8%) and 1,566 (8.7%) non-Swiss women. Of the population in the district 6,092 or about 36.4% were born in Gäu and lived there in 2000. There were 3,970 or 23.7% who were born in the same canton, while 3,794 or 22.7% were born somewhere else in Switzerland, and 2,343 or 14.0% were born outside of Switzerland.

In 2008 there were 151 live births to Swiss citizens and 40 births to non-Swiss citizens, and in same time span there were 118 deaths of Swiss citizens and 6 non-Swiss citizen deaths. Ignoring immigration and emigration, the population of Swiss citizens increased by 33 while the foreign population increased by 34. There were 13 Swiss men and 15 Swiss women who immigrated back to Switzerland. At the same time, there were 64 non-Swiss men and 73 non-Swiss women who immigrated from another country to Switzerland. The total Swiss population change in 2008 (from all sources, including moves across municipal borders) was an increase of 129 and the non-Swiss population increased by 134 people. This represents a population growth rate of 1.5%.

As of 2000, there were 7,040 people who were single and never married in the district. There were 8,034 married individuals, 882 widows or widowers and 781 individuals who are divorced.

There were 1,856 households that consist of only one person and 525 households with five or more people. Out of a total of 6,707 households that answered this question, 27.7% were households made up of just one person and 61 were adults who lived with their parents. Of the rest of the households, there are 1,984 married couples without children, 2,306 married couples with children There were 311 single parents with a child or children. There were 87 households that were made up unrelated people and 102 households that were made some sort of institution or another collective housing.

The historical population is given in the following chart:

== Politics ==
In the 2007 federal election the most popular party was the SVP which received 29.77% of the vote. The next three most popular parties were the CVP (29.24%), the FDP (23.3%) and the SP (11.06%). In the federal election, a total of 6,158 votes were cast, and the voter turnout was 52.5%.

== Religion ==
From the 2000 census, 9,422 or 56.3% were Roman Catholic, while 3,682 or 22.0% belonged to the Swiss Reformed Church. Of the rest of the population, there were 323 members of an Orthodox church (or about 1.93% of the population), there were 29 individuals (or about 0.17% of the population) who belonged to the Christian Catholic Church, and there were 196 individuals (or about 1.17% of the population) who belonged to another Christian church. There was 1 individual who was Jewish, and 980 (or about 5.86% of the population) who were Islamic. There were 62 individuals who were Buddhist, 34 individuals who were Hindu and 6 individuals who belonged to another church. 1,562 (or about 9.33% of the population) belonged to no church, are agnostic or atheist, and 440 individuals (or about 2.63% of the population) did not answer the question.

== Education ==
In Gäu about 6,556 or (39.2%) of the population have completed non-mandatory upper secondary education, and 1,493 or (8.9%) have completed additional higher education (either University or a Fachhochschule). Of the 1,493 who completed tertiary schooling, 72.8% were Swiss men, 17.3% were Swiss women, 6.7% were non-Swiss men and 3.2% were non-Swiss women.

During the 2010-2011 school year there were a total of 451 students in the Gäu school system. The education system in the Canton of Solothurn requires students to attend six years of primary school, with some of the children attending smaller, specialized classes. In the Gäu district system there were no students in primary school but 21 students in the special, smaller classes. The secondary school program consists of three lower, obligatory years of schooling, followed by three to five years of optional, advanced schools. 430 lower secondary students attend school in the district schools.
