= Kestenholz =

- Municipality
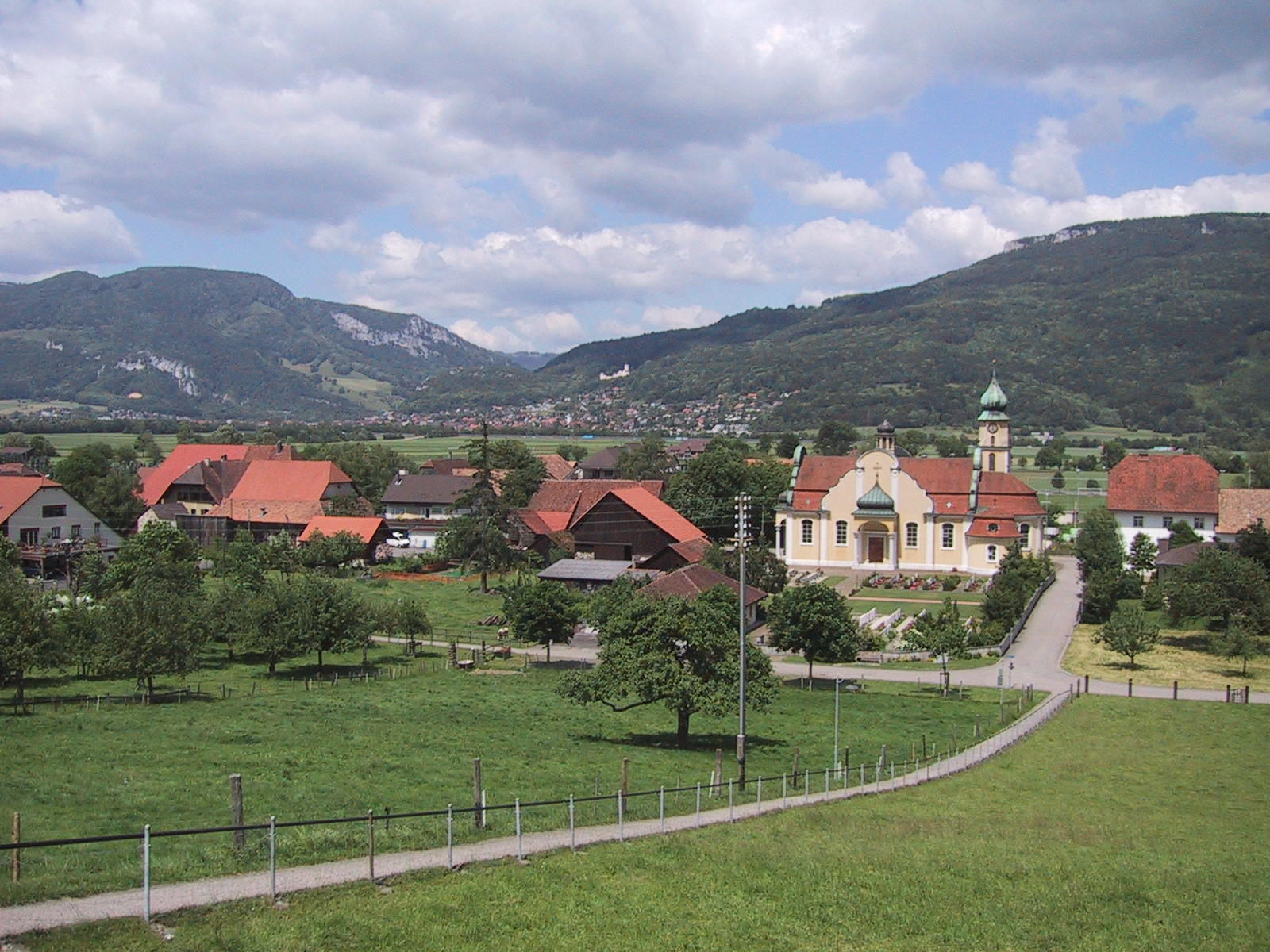
- Kestenholz village

- Flag Coat of arms
- Location of Kestenholz
- Location within Switzerland Location within Canton of Solothurn
- Coordinates: 47°17′N 7°45′E
- Country: Switzerland
- Canton: Solothurn
- District: Gäu

Area
  - Total: 8.58 km^{2} (3.31 sq mi)
- Elevation: 450 m (1,480 ft)

Population (December 2020)
  - Total: 1,848
  - Density: 215/km^{2} (558/sq mi)
- Time zone: UTC+01:00 (CET)
  - Summer (DST): UTC+02:00 (CEST)
- Postal code: 4703
- SFOS number: 2403
- ISO 3166 code: CH-SO
- Surrounded by: Niederbipp (BE), Niederbuchsiten, Oberbuchsiten, Oensingen, Schwarzhäusern (BE), Wolfwil
- Website: www.kestenholz.ch

Kestenholz is a municipality in the district of Gäu in the canton of Solothurn in Switzerland.

== History ==
Kestenholz is first mentioned around 1280-1340 as Im Kestenholtz. In 1323 it was mentioned as ze obern Kappellon.

== Geography ==
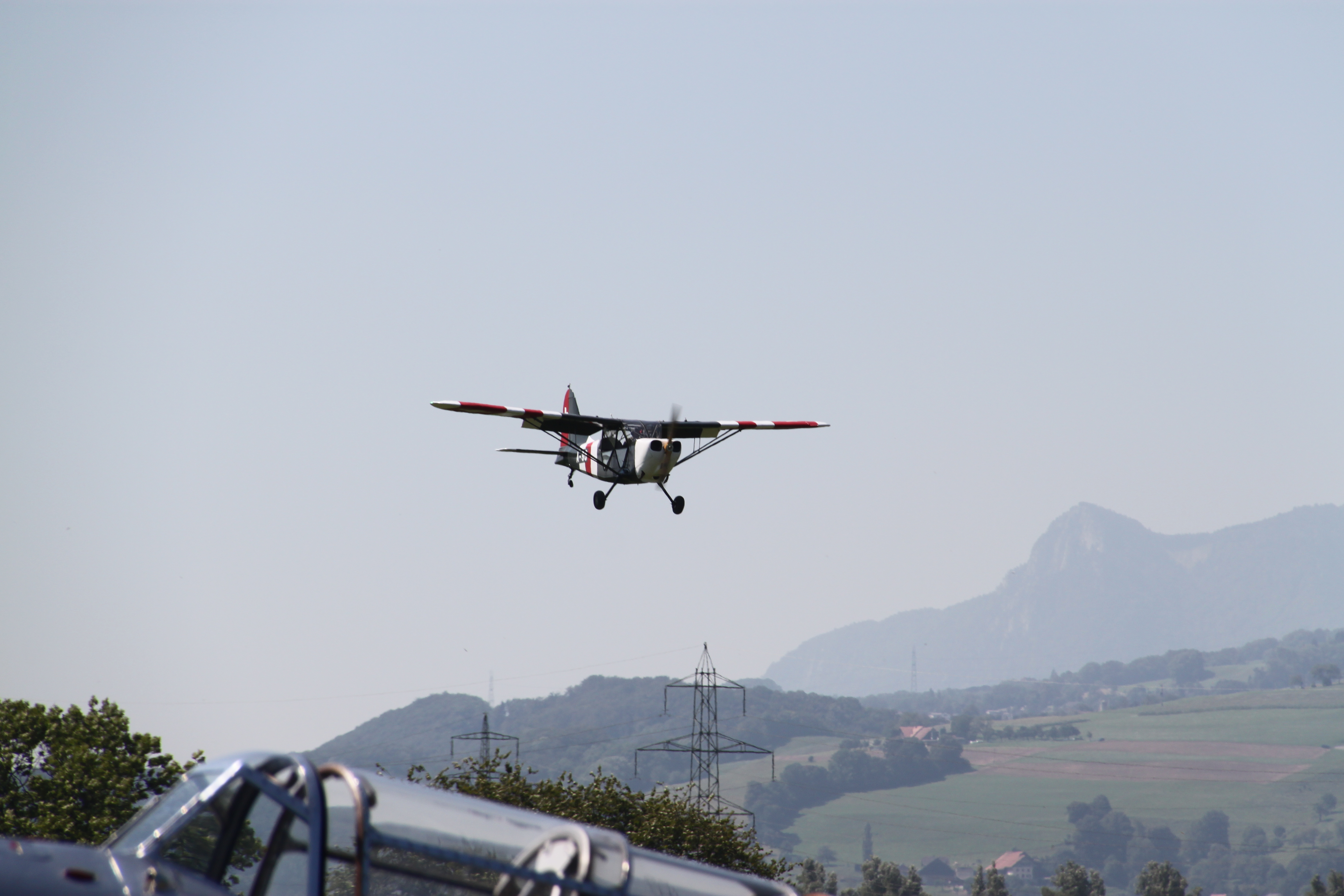
Kestenholz during the Oldtimerflugtage in 2009

Aerial view (1950)

Kestenholz has an area, as of 2009, of 8.58 square kilometers (3.31 sq mi). Of this area, 4.5 km^{2} (1.7 sq mi) or 52.4% is used for agricultural purposes, while 3.27 km^{2} (1.26 sq mi) or 38.1% is forested. Of the rest of the land, 0.81 km^{2} (0.31 sq mi) or 9.4% is settled (buildings or roads), 0.02 km^{2} (4.9 acres) or 0.2% is either rivers or lakes.

Of the built up area, housing and buildings made up 4.7% and transportation infrastructure made up 2.9%. Out of the forested land, all of the forested land area is covered with heavy forests. Of the agricultural land, 42.4% is used for growing crops and 8.9% is pastures, while 1.2% is used for orchards or vine crops. All the water in the municipality is flowing water.

The municipality is located in the Gäu district, on the southern edge of the Dünnern. It consists of the linear village of Kestenholz and the settlement of Rain.

== Coat of arms ==
The blazon of the municipal coat of arms is Argent a Chestnut Tree Maroon leaved Vert issuant from a Bar wavy Gules.

== Demographics ==
Kestenholz has a population (as of December 2020) of 1,848. As of 2008, 5.9% of the population are resident foreign nationals. Over the last 10 years (1999–2009 ) the population has changed at a rate of 4.6%.

Most of the population (as of 2000) speaks German (1,550 or 95.9%), with Italian being second most common (18 or 1.1%) and Albanian being third (15 or 0.9%). There are 11 people who speak French and 1 person who speaks Romansh.

As of 2008, the gender distribution of the population was 50.2% male and 49.8% female. The population was made up of 783 Swiss men (46.4% of the population) and 65 (3.8%) non-Swiss men. There were 788 Swiss women (46.7%) and 53 (3.1%) non-Swiss women. Of the population in the municipality 743 or about 45.9% were born in Kestenholz and lived there in 2000. There were 420 or 26.0% who were born in the same canton, while 324 or 20.0% were born somewhere else in Switzerland, and 118 or 7.3% were born outside of Switzerland.

In 2008 there were 15 live births to Swiss citizens and 1 birth to non-Swiss citizens, and in same time span there were 8 deaths of Swiss citizens and 1 non-Swiss citizen death. Ignoring immigration and emigration, the population of Swiss citizens increased by 7 while the foreign population remained the same. There were 2 Swiss men and 1 Swiss woman who emigrated from Switzerland. At the same time, there were 4 non-Swiss men and 3 non-Swiss women who immigrated from another country to Switzerland. The total Swiss population change in 2008 (from all sources, including moves across municipal borders) was an increase of 6 and the non-Swiss population decreased by 4 people. This represents a population growth rate of 0.1%.

The age distribution, as of 2000, in Kestenholz is; 163 children or 10.1% of the population are between 0 and 6 years old and 258 teenagers or 16.0% are between 7 and 19. Of the adult population, 95 people or 5.9% of the population are between 20 and 24 years old. 541 people or 33.5% are between 25 and 44, and 357 people or 22.1% are between 45 and 64. The senior population distribution is 157 people or 9.7% of the population are between 65 and 79 years old and there are 46 people or 2.8% who are over 80.

As of 2000, there were 699 people who were single and never married in the municipality. There were 777 married individuals, 78 widows or widowers and 63 individuals who are divorced.

As of 2000, there were 647 private households in the municipality, and an average of 2.5 persons per household. There were 177 households that consist of only one person and 61 households with five or more people. Out of a total of 650 households that answered this question, 27.2% were households made up of just one person and there were 7 adults who lived with their parents. Of the rest of the households, there are 185 married couples without children, 240 married couples with children There were 30 single parents with a child or children. There were 8 households that were made up of unrelated people and 3 households that were made up of some sort of institution or another collective housing.

In 2000 there were 316 single-family homes (or 70.9% of the total) out of a total of 446 inhabited buildings. There were 70 multi-family buildings (15.7%), along with 47 multi-purpose buildings that were mostly used for housing (10.5%) and 13 other use buildings (commercial or industrial) that also had some housing (2.9%). Of the single-family homes 25 were built before 1919, while 56 were built between 1990 and 2000. The greatest number of single-family homes (70) were built between 1971 and 1980.

In 2000 there were 666 apartments in the municipality. The most common apartment size was 4 rooms of which there were 196. There were 20 single-room apartments and 307 apartments with five or more rooms. Of these apartments, a total of 639 apartments (95.9% of the total) were permanently occupied, while 7 apartments (1.1%) were seasonally occupied and 20 apartments (3.0%) were empty. As of 2009, the construction rate of new housing units was 4.8 new units per 1000 residents. The vacancy rate for the municipality, in 2010, was 1.38%.

The historical population is given in the following chart:

== Politics ==
In the 2007 federal election the most popular party was the CVP which received 34.06% of the vote. The next three most popular parties were the SVP (25.03%), the FDP (20.31%) and the SP (12.64%). In the federal election, a total of 698 votes were cast, and the voter turnout was 58.0%.

== Economy ==
As of 2010, Kestenholz had an unemployment rate of 1.7%. As of 2008, there were 56 people employed in the primary economic sector and about 20 businesses involved in this sector. 142 people were employed in the secondary sector and there were 17 businesses in this sector. 748 people were employed in the tertiary sector, with 49 businesses in this sector. There were 927 residents of the municipality who were employed in some capacity, of which females made up 43.0% of the workforce.

In 2008 the total number of full-time equivalent jobs was 615. The number of jobs in the primary sector was 37, of which 31 were in agriculture and 6 were in forestry or lumber production. The number of jobs in the secondary sector was 130 of which 81 or (62.3%) were in manufacturing and 49 (37.7%) were in construction. The number of jobs in the tertiary sector was 448. In the tertiary sector; 211 or 47.1% were in wholesale or retail sales or the repair of motor vehicles, 13 or 2.9% were in the movement and storage of goods, 22 or 4.9% were in a hotel or restaurant, 1 was in the information industry, 4 or 0.9% were the insurance or financial industry, 165 or 36.8% were technical professionals or scientists, 14 or 3.1% were in education and 8 or 1.8% were in health care.

In 2000, there were 346 workers who commuted into the municipality and 676 workers who commuted away. The municipality is a net exporter of workers, with about 2.0 workers leaving the municipality for every one entering. Of the working population, 11.1% used public transportation to get to work, and 62.6% used a private car.

== Religion ==
From the 2000 census, 1,181 or 73.0% were Roman Catholic, while 289 or 17.9% belonged to the Swiss Reformed Church. Of the rest of the population, there was 1 member of an Orthodox church who belonged, there were 3 individuals (or about 0.19% of the population) who belonged to the Christian Catholic Church, and there were 14 individuals (or about 0.87% of the population) who belonged to another Christian church. There were 27 (or about 1.67% of the population) who were Islamic. 89 (or about 5.50% of the population) belonged to no church, are agnostic or atheist, and 12 individuals (or about 0.74% of the population) did not answer the question.

== Education ==
In Kestenholz about 689 or (42.6%) of the population have completed non-mandatory upper secondary education, and 166 or (10.3%) have completed additional higher education (either university or a Fachhochschule). Of the 166 who completed tertiary schooling, 77.7% were Swiss men, 14.5% were Swiss women, 4.8% were non-Swiss men and 3.0% were non-Swiss women.

During the 2010-2011 school year there were a total of 193 students in the Kestenholz school system. The education system in the Canton of Solothurn allows young children to attend two years of non-obligatory Kindergarten. During that school year, there were 55 children in kindergarten. The canton's school system requires students to attend six years of primary school, with some of the children attending smaller, specialized classes. In the municipality there were 138 students in primary school. The secondary school program consists of three lower, obligatory years of schooling, followed by three to five years of optional, advanced schools. All the lower secondary students from Kestenholz attend their school in a neighboring municipality.

As of 2000, there were 94 students from Kestenholz who attended schools outside the municipality.
