= Wolfwil =

- Municipality
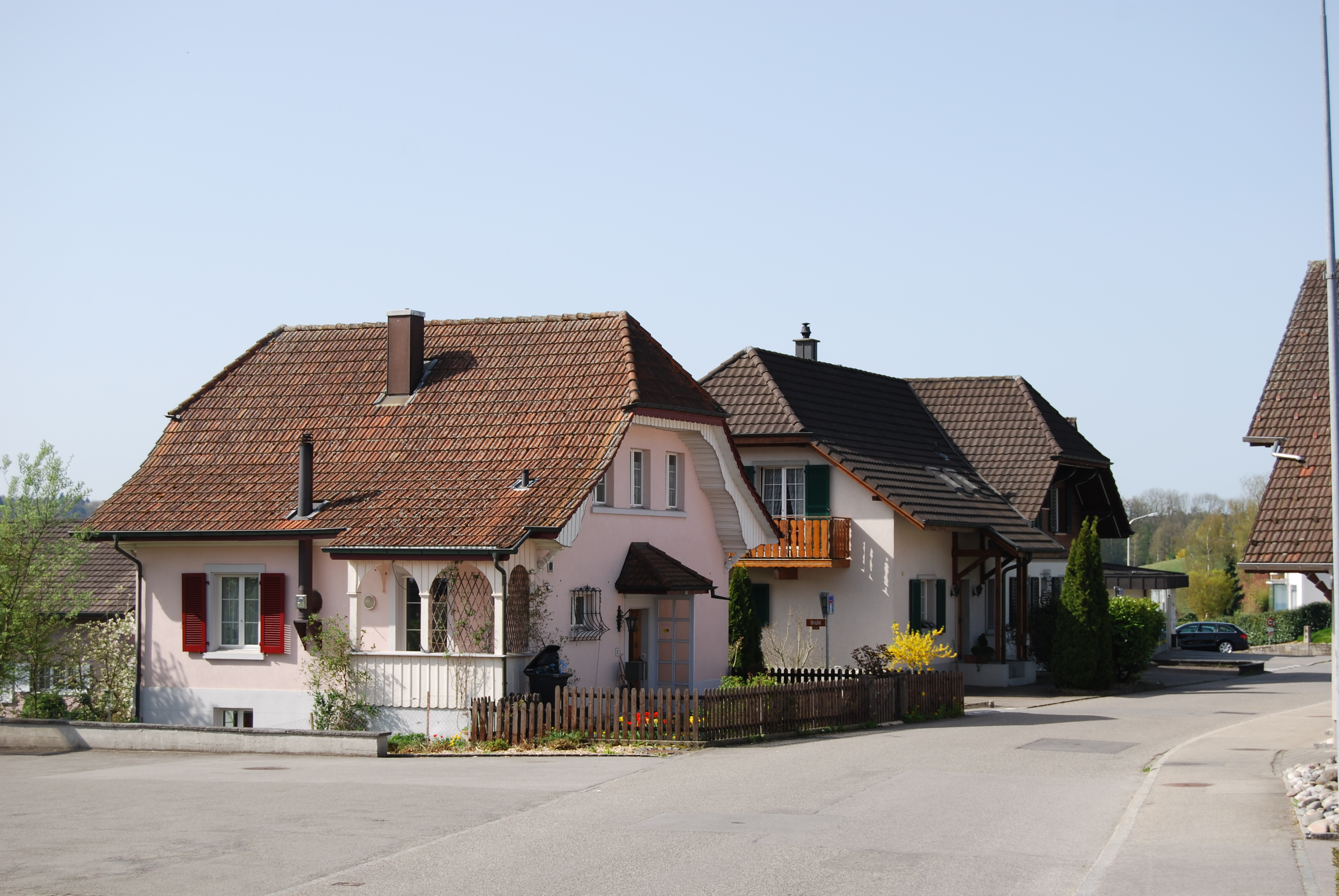

- Coat of arms
- Location of Wolfwil
- Location within Switzerland Location within Canton of Solothurn
- Coordinates: 47°16′N 7°48′E
- Country: Switzerland
- Canton: Solothurn
- District: Gäu

Area
  - Total: 6.88 km^{2} (2.66 sq mi)
- Elevation: 427 m (1,401 ft)

Population (December 2020)
  - Total: 2,363
  - Density: 343/km^{2} (890/sq mi)
- Time zone: UTC+01:00 (CET)
  - Summer (DST): UTC+02:00 (CEST)
- Postal code: 4628
- SFOS number: 2408
- ISO 3166 code: CH-SO
- Surrounded by: Fulenbach, Kestenholz, Murgenthal (AG), Neuendorf, Niederbuchsiten, Schwarzhäusern (BE), Wynau (BE)
- Website: www.wolfwil.ch

Wolfwil is a municipality in the district of Gäu in the canton of Solothurn in Switzerland.

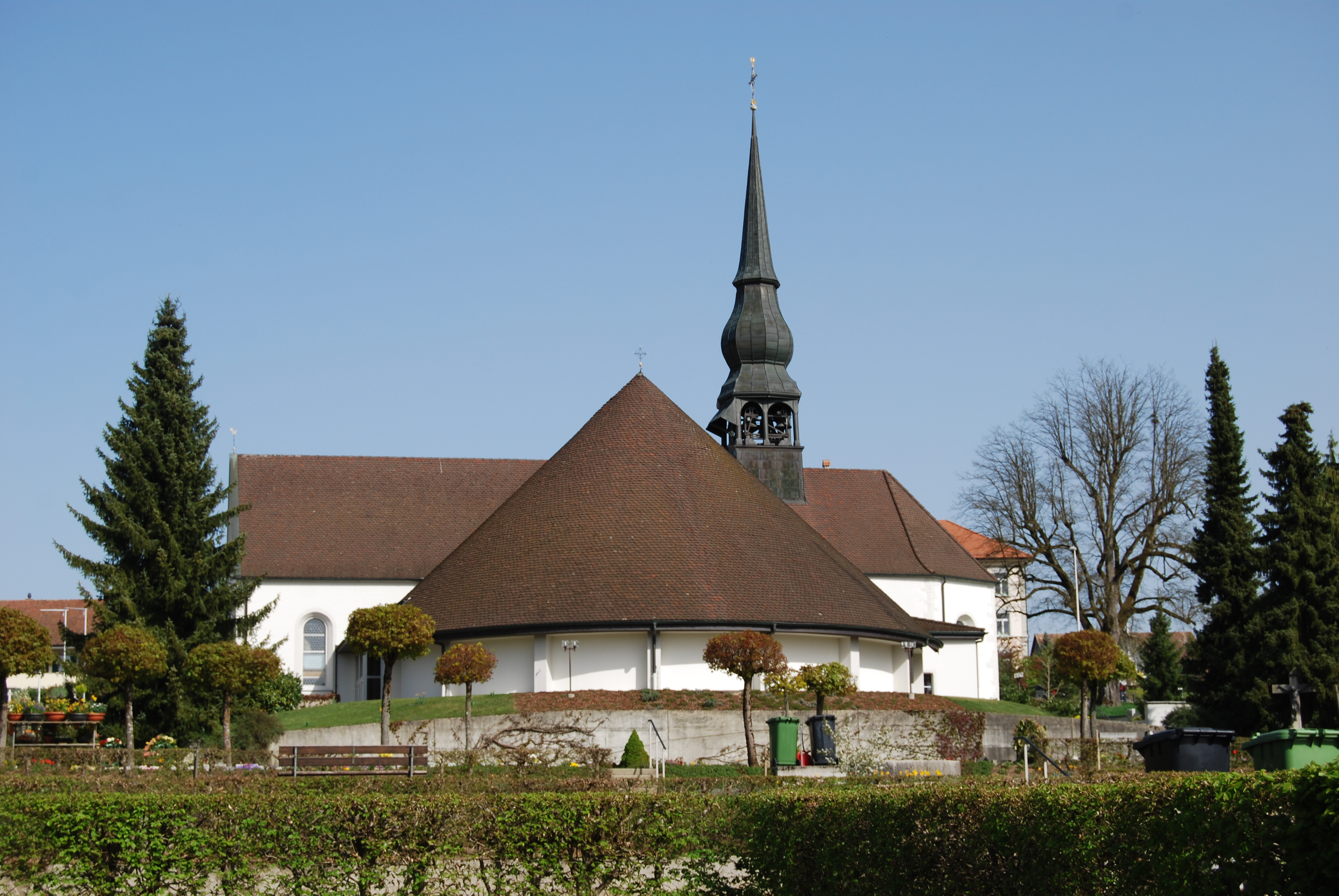
Wolfwil

== History ==
Wolfwil is first mentioned in 1266 as Wolfwiler.

== Geography ==
Aerial view (1948)

Wolfwil has an area, as of 2009, of 6.88 square kilometers (2.66 sq mi). Of this area, 3.73 km^{2} (1.44 sq mi) or 54.2% is used for agricultural purposes, while 1.95 km^{2} (0.75 sq mi) or 28.3% is forested. Of the rest of the land, 0.92 km^{2} (0.36 sq mi) or 13.4% is settled (buildings or roads), 0.27 km^{2} (0.10 sq mi) or 3.9% is either rivers or lakes and 0.01 km^{2} (2.5 acres) or 0.1% is unproductive land.

Of the built up area, industrial buildings made up 1.5% of the total area while housing and buildings made up 7.4% and transportation infrastructure made up 3.3%. Out of the forested land, 27.0% of the total land area is heavily forested and 1.3% is covered with orchards or small clusters of trees. Of the agricultural land, 44.8% is used for growing crops and 8.7% is pastures. All the water in the municipality is flowing water.

The municipality is located in the Gäu district, in the Aaregäu region. It consists of the linear village of Wolfwil and the settlements of Far and Oberer Schweissacher.

== Coat of arms ==
The blazon of the municipal coat of arms is Argent a Wolf Gules passant over a Base of the same inscribed WW of the first.

== Demographics ==
Wolfwil has a population (as of December 2020) of 2,363. As of 2008, 5.7% of the population are resident foreign nationals. Over the last 10 years (1999–2009 ) the population has changed at a rate of 0.6%.

Most of the population (as of 2000) speaks German (1,876 or 96.8%), with Albanian being second most common (22 or 1.1%) and Italian being third (18 or 0.9%). There are 3 people who speak French.

As of 2008, the gender distribution of the population was 48.1% male and 51.9% female. The population was made up of 911 Swiss men (45.0% of the population) and 63 (3.1%) non-Swiss men. There were 978 Swiss women (48.3%) and 72 (3.6%) non-Swiss women. Of the population in the municipality 980 or about 50.5% were born in Wolfwil and lived there in 2000. There were 356 or 18.4% who were born in the same canton, while 433 or 22.3% were born somewhere else in Switzerland, and 123 or 6.3% were born outside of Switzerland.

In 2008 there were 18 live births to Swiss citizens and 1 birth to non-Swiss citizens, and in same time span there were 23 deaths of Swiss citizens. Ignoring immigration and emigration, the population of Swiss citizens decreased by 5 while the foreign population increased by 1. There were 4 Swiss women who immigrated back to Switzerland. At the same time, there were 7 non-Swiss men and 7 non-Swiss women who immigrated from another country to Switzerland. The total Swiss population change in 2008 (from all sources, including moves across municipal borders) was a decrease of 7 and the non-Swiss population increased by 12 people. This represents a population growth rate of 0.2%.

The age distribution, as of 2000, in Wolfwil is; 152 children or 7.8% of the population are between 0 and 6 years old and 331 teenagers or 17.1% are between 7 and 19. Of the adult population, 85 people or 4.4% of the population are between 20 and 24 years old. 573 people or 29.6% are between 25 and 44, and 460 people or 23.7% are between 45 and 64. The senior population distribution is 262 people or 13.5% of the population are between 65 and 79 years old and there are 76 people or 3.9% who are over 80.

As of 2000, there were 751 people who were single and never married in the municipality. There were 1,006 married individuals, 117 widows or widowers and 65 individuals who are divorced.

As of 2000, there were 782 private households in the municipality, and an average of 2.5 persons per household. There were 197 households that consist of only one person and 60 households with five or more people. Out of a total of 788 households that answered this question, 25.0% were households made up of just one person and there were 8 adults who lived with their parents. Of the rest of the households, there are 262 married couples without children, 272 married couples with children There were 36 single parents with a child or children. There were 7 households that were made up of unrelated people and 6 households that were made up of some sort of institution or another collective housing.

In 2000 there were 441 single family homes (or 70.7% of the total) out of a total of 624 inhabited buildings. There were 84 multi-family buildings (13.5%), along with 80 multi-purpose buildings that were mostly used for housing (12.8%) and 19 other use buildings (commercial or industrial) that also had some housing (3.0%). Of the single family homes 36 were built before 1919, while 60 were built between 1990 and 2000. The greatest number of single family homes (97) were built between 1946 and 1960.

In 2000 there were 818 apartments in the municipality. The most common apartment size was 5 rooms of which there were 241. There were 14 single room apartments and 382 apartments with five or more rooms. Of these apartments, a total of 762 apartments (93.2% of the total) were permanently occupied, while 28 apartments (3.4%) were seasonally occupied and 28 apartments (3.4%) were empty. As of 2009, the construction rate of new housing units was 5.5 new units per 1000 residents. The vacancy rate for the municipality, in 2010, was 0.23%.

The historical population is given in the following chart:

== Politics ==
In the 2007 federal election the most popular party was the FDP which received 35.63% of the vote. The next three most popular parties were the CVP (34.78%), the SVP (18.3%) and the SP (5.88%). In the federal election, a total of 986 votes were cast, and the voter turnout was 63.3%.

== Economy ==
As of 2010, Wolfwil had an unemployment rate of 2.6%. As of 2008, there were 47 people employed in the primary economic sector and about 19 businesses involved in this sector. 302 people were employed in the secondary sector and there were 31 businesses in this sector. 255 people were employed in the tertiary sector, with 58 businesses in this sector. There were 1,020 residents of the municipality who were employed in some capacity, of which females made up 41.8% of the workforce.

In 2008 the total number of full-time equivalent jobs was 519. The number of jobs in the primary sector was 34, all of which were in agriculture. The number of jobs in the secondary sector was 282 of which 176 or (62.4%) were in manufacturing and 106 (37.6%) were in construction. The number of jobs in the tertiary sector was 203. In the tertiary sector; 74 or 36.5% were in wholesale or retail sales or the repair of motor vehicles, 49 or 24.1% were in the movement and storage of goods, 12 or 5.9% were in a hotel or restaurant, 1 was in the information industry, 6 or 3.0% were the insurance or financial industry, 24 or 11.8% were technical professionals or scientists, 17 or 8.4% were in education and 7 or 3.4% were in health care.

In 2000, there were 387 workers who commuted into the municipality and 691 workers who commuted away. The municipality is a net exporter of workers, with about 1.8 workers leaving the municipality for every one entering. Of the working population, 10.9% used public transportation to get to work, and 63.5% used a private car.

== Religion ==
From the 2000 census, 1,328 or 68.5% were Roman Catholic, while 385 or 19.9% belonged to the Swiss Reformed Church. Of the rest of the population, there were 9 members of an Orthodox church (or about 0.46% of the population), there were 6 individuals (or about 0.31% of the population) who belonged to the Christian Catholic Church, and there were 28 individuals (or about 1.44% of the population) who belonged to another Christian church. There were 27 (or about 1.39% of the population) who were Islamic. There were 3 individuals who were Buddhist. 128 (or about 6.60% of the population) belonged to no church, are agnostic or atheist, and 25 individuals (or about 1.29% of the population) did not answer the question.

== Education ==
In Wolfwil about 804 or (41.5%) of the population have completed non-mandatory upper secondary education, and 143 or (7.4%) have completed additional higher education (either university or a Fachhochschule). Of the 143 who completed tertiary schooling, 78.3% were Swiss men, 18.2% were Swiss women.

During the 2010–2011 school year there were a total of 150 students in the Wolfwil school system. The education system in the Canton of Solothurn allows young children to attend two years of non-obligatory Kindergarten. During that school year, there were 45 children in kindergarten. The canton's school system requires students to attend six years of primary school, with some of the children attending smaller, specialized classes. In the municipality there were 105 students in primary school. The secondary school program consists of three lower, obligatory years of schooling, followed by three to five years of optional, advanced schools. All the lower secondary students from Wolfwil attend their school in a neighboring municipality.

As of 2000, there were 72 students in Wolfwil who came from another municipality, while 44 residents attended schools outside the municipality.
