= Niederbuchsiten =

- Municipality
- Flag Coat of arms
- Location of Niederbuchsiten
- Location within Switzerland Location within Canton of Solothurn
- Coordinates: 47°18′N 7°46′E
- Country: Switzerland
- Canton: Solothurn
- District: Gäu

Area
  - Total: 5.48 km^{2} (2.12 sq mi)
- Elevation: 465 m (1,526 ft)

Population (December 2020)
  - Total: 1,260
  - Density: 230/km^{2} (596/sq mi)
- Time zone: UTC+01:00 (CET)
  - Summer (DST): UTC+02:00 (CEST)
- Postal code: 4626
- SFOS number: 2405
- ISO 3166 code: CH-SO
- Surrounded by: Kestenholz, Neuendorf, Oberbuchsiten, Wolfwil
- Website: www.niederbuchsiten.ch

Niederbuchsiten is a municipality in the district of Gäu in the canton of Solothurn in Switzerland.

== History ==
Niederbuchsiten is first mentioned in 1040 as vico Buxita. In 1299 it was mentioned as Nidrabuchsiten.

== Geography ==
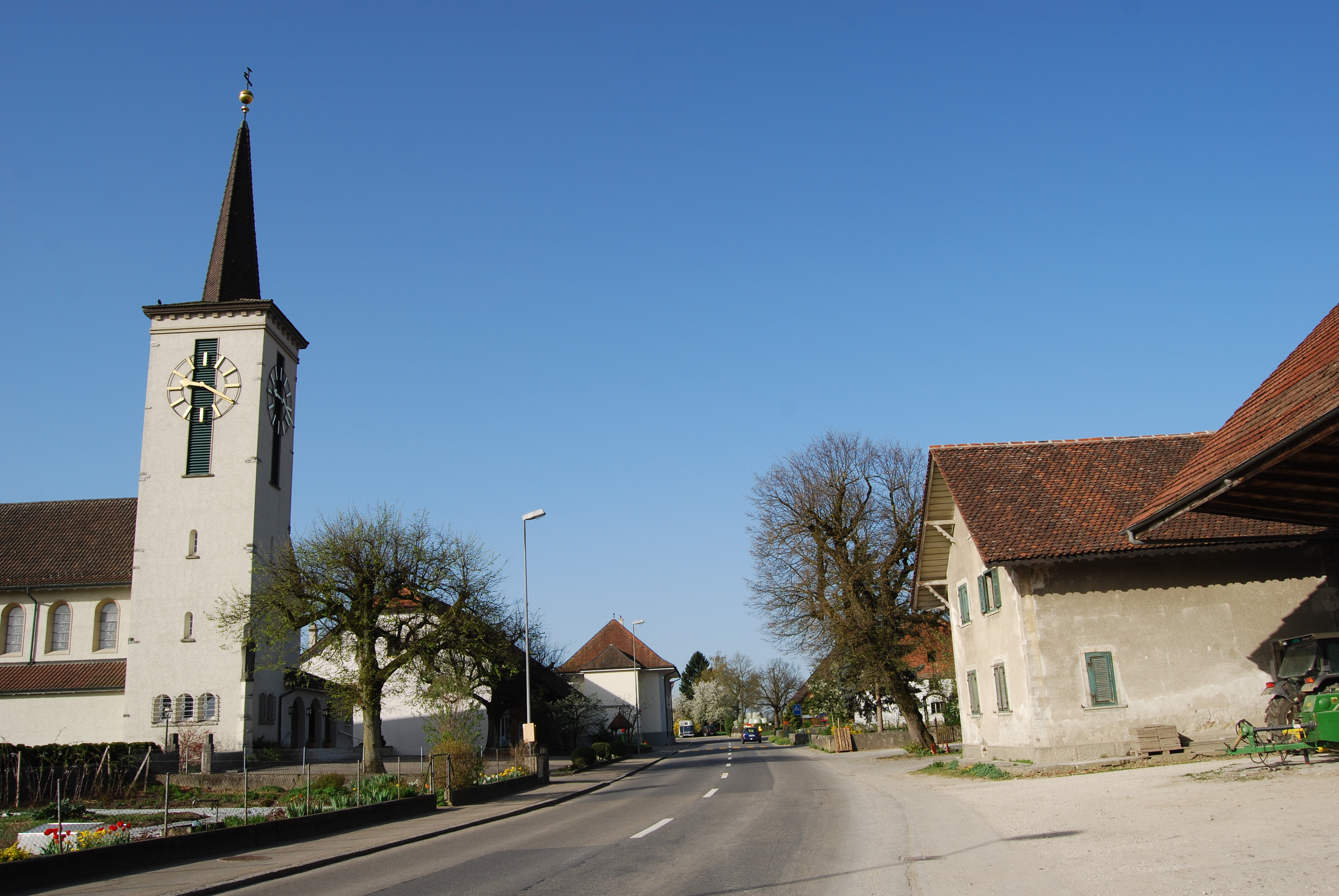
Niederbuchsiten

Niederbuchsiten has an area, as of 2009, of 5.48 square kilometers (2.12 sq mi). Of this area, 3.03 km^{2} (1.17 sq mi) or 55.3% is used for agricultural purposes, while 1.96 km^{2} (0.76 sq mi) or 35.8% is forested. Of the rest of the land, 0.5 km^{2} (0.19 sq mi) or 9.1% is settled (buildings or roads).

Of the built up area, housing and buildings made up 5.7% and transportation infrastructure made up 2.4%. Out of the forested land, all of the forested land area is covered with heavy forests. Of the agricultural land, 45.4% is used for growing crops and 7.1% is pastures, while 2.7% is used for orchards or vine crops.

The municipality is located in the Gäu district, along the banks of the Dünnern. It is located at an elevation of 443 m (1,453 ft), south of Oberbuchsiten and the A1 motorway. It consists of the linear village of Niederbuchsiten.

== Coat of arms ==
The blazon of the municipal coat of arms is Azure on a Book Or bound Gules three Apples of the second.

== Demographics ==
Niederbuchsiten has a population (as of December 2020) of 1,260. As of 2008, 7.5% of the population are resident foreign nationals. Over the last 10 years (1999–2009 ) the population has changed at a rate of 3.7%.

Most of the population (as of 2000) speaks German (904 or 95.5%), with Turkish being second most common (14 or 1.5%) and Italian being third (6 or 0.6%). There is 1 person who speaks French.

As of 2008, the gender distribution of the population was 51.5% male and 48.5% female. The population was made up of 454 Swiss men (46.6% of the population) and 48 (4.9%) non-Swiss men. There were 431 Swiss women (44.2%) and 42 (4.3%) non-Swiss women. Of the population in the municipality 388 or about 41.0% were born in Niederbuchsiten and lived there in 2000. There were 245 or 25.9% who were born in the same canton, while 191 or 20.2% were born somewhere else in Switzerland, and 81 or 8.6% were born outside of Switzerland.

In 2008 there were 9 live births to Swiss citizens and 1 birth to non-Swiss citizens, and in same time span there were 10 deaths of Swiss citizens. Ignoring immigration and emigration, the population of Swiss citizens decreased by 1 while the foreign population increased by 1. There was 1 Swiss man and 1 Swiss woman who emigrated from Switzerland. At the same time, there was 1 non-Swiss man and 5 non-Swiss women who immigrated from another country to Switzerland. The total Swiss population change in 2008 (from all sources, including moves across municipal borders) was an increase of 2 and the non-Swiss population decreased by 12 people. This represents a population growth rate of -1.0%.

The age distribution, as of 2000, in Niederbuchsiten is; 81 children or 8.6% of the population are between 0 and 6 years old and 152 teenagers or 16.1% are between 7 and 19. Of the adult population, 35 people or 3.7% of the population are between 20 and 24 years old. 339 people or 35.8% are between 25 and 44, and 198 people or 20.9% are between 45 and 64. The senior population distribution is 104 people or 11.0% of the population are between 65 and 79 years old and there are 38 people or 4.0% who are over 80.

As of 2000, there were 398 people who were single and never married in the municipality. There were 443 married individuals, 59 widows or widowers and 47 individuals who are divorced.

As of 2000, there were 359 private households in the municipality, and an average of 2.5 persons per household. There were 91 households that consist of only one person and 29 households with five or more people. Out of a total of 371 households that answered this question, 24.5% were households made up of just one person and there were 3 adults who lived with their parents. Of the rest of the households, there are 107 married couples without children, 134 married couples with children There were 19 single parents with a child or children. There were 5 households that were made up of unrelated people and 12 households that were made up of some sort of institution or another collective housing.

In 2000 there were 152 single family homes (or 65.8% of the total) out of a total of 231 inhabited buildings. There were 34 multi-family buildings (14.7%), along with 37 multi-purpose buildings that were mostly used for housing (16.0%) and 8 other use buildings (commercial or industrial) that also had some housing (3.5%). Of the single family homes 14 were built before 1919, while 24 were built between 1990 and 2000. The greatest number of single family homes (43) were built between 1981 and 1990.

In 2000 there were 388 apartments in the municipality. The most common apartment size was 4 rooms of which there were 116. There were 5 single room apartments and 146 apartments with five or more rooms. Of these apartments, a total of 348 apartments (89.7% of the total) were permanently occupied, while 22 apartments (5.7%) were seasonally occupied and 18 apartments (4.6%) were empty. As of 2009, the construction rate of new housing units was 3.1 new units per 1000 residents. The vacancy rate for the municipality, in 2010, was 0.95%.

The historical population is given in the following chart:

== Sights ==
The entire village of Niederbuchsiten is part of the Inventory of Swiss Heritage Sites.

== Politics ==
In the 2007 federal election the most popular party was the SVP which received 34.21% of the vote. The next three most popular parties were the CVP (33.37%), the FDP (20.94%) and the SP (7.03%). In the federal election, a total of 384 votes were cast, and the voter turnout was 52.4%.

== Economy ==
The head office of JURA Elektroapparate AG is located in Niederbuchsiten.

As of 2010, Niederbuchsiten had an unemployment rate of 1.8%. As of 2008, there were 60 people employed in the primary economic sector and about 21 businesses involved in this sector. 75 people were employed in the secondary sector and there were 7 businesses in this sector. 509 people were employed in the tertiary sector, with 26 businesses in this sector. There were 506 residents of the municipality who were employed in some capacity, of which females made up 41.3% of the workforce.

In 2008 the total number of full-time equivalent jobs was 549. The number of jobs in the primary sector was 35, all of which were in agriculture. The number of jobs in the secondary sector was 65 of which 39 or (60.0%) were in manufacturing and 26 (40.0%) were in construction. The number of jobs in the tertiary sector was 449. In the tertiary sector; 357 or 79.5% were in wholesale or retail sales or the repair of motor vehicles, 19 or 4.2% were in the movement and storage of goods, 7 or 1.6% were in a hotel or restaurant, 1 was in the information industry, 2 or 0.4% were the insurance or financial industry, 17 or 3.8% were technical professionals or scientists, 6 or 1.3% were in education and 38 or 8.5% were in health care.

In 2000, there were 356 workers who commuted into the municipality and 383 workers who commuted away. The municipality is a net exporter of workers, with about 1.1 workers leaving the municipality for every one entering. Of the working population, 11.1% used public transportation to get to work, and 60.5% used a private car.

== Religion ==
From the 2000 census, 588 or 62.1% were Roman Catholic, while 152 or 16.1% belonged to the Swiss Reformed Church. Of the rest of the population, there were 2 members of an Orthodox church (or about 0.21% of the population), there were 3 individuals (or about 0.32% of the population) who belonged to the Christian Catholic Church, and there were 9 individuals (or about 0.95% of the population) who belonged to another Christian church. There were 54 (or about 5.70% of the population) who were Islamic. There was 1 person who was Buddhist, 4 individuals who were Hindu and 1 individual who belonged to another church. 98 (or about 10.35% of the population) belonged to no church, are agnostic or atheist, and 35 individuals (or about 3.70% of the population) did not answer the question.

== Education ==
In Niederbuchsiten about 366 or (38.6%) of the population have completed non-mandatory upper secondary education, and 61 or (6.4%) have completed additional higher education (either university or a Fachhochschule). Of the 61 who completed tertiary schooling, 70.5% were Swiss men, 23.0% were Swiss women.

During the 2010-2011 school year there were a total of 88 students in the Niederbuchsiten school system. The education system in the Canton of Solothurn allows young children to attend two years of non-obligatory Kindergarten. During that school year, there were 20 children in kindergarten. The canton's school system requires students to attend six years of primary school, with some of the children attending smaller, specialized classes. In the municipality there were 68 students in primary school. The secondary school program consists of three lower, obligatory years of schooling, followed by three to five years of optional, advanced schools. All the lower secondary students from Niederbuchsiten attend their school in a neighboring municipality.

As of 2000, there were 8 students in Niederbuchsiten who came from another municipality, while 52 residents attended schools outside the municipality.
