= Oberbuchsiten =

- Municipality
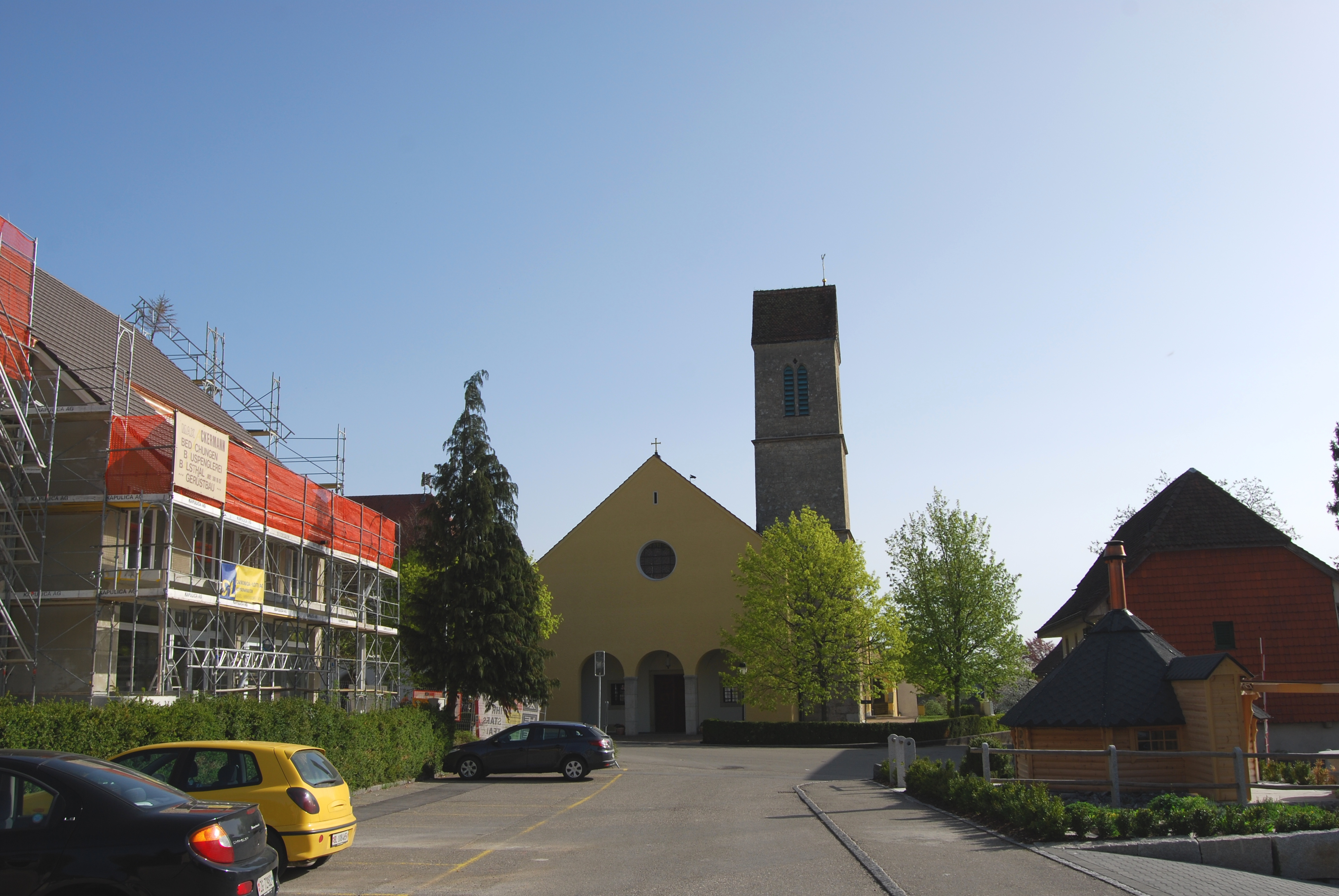

- Coat of arms
- Location of Oberbuchsiten
- Location within Switzerland Location within Canton of Solothurn
- Coordinates: 47°18′N 7°46′E
- Country: Switzerland
- Canton: Solothurn
- District: Gäu

Area
  - Total: 9.4 km^{2} (3.6 sq mi)
- Elevation: 442 m (1,450 ft)

Population (December 2020)
  - Total: 2,296
  - Density: 240/km^{2} (630/sq mi)
- Time zone: UTC+01:00 (CET)
  - Summer (DST): UTC+02:00 (CEST)
- Postal code: 4625
- SFOS number: 2406
- ISO 3166 code: CH-SO
- Surrounded by: Balsthal, Egerkingen, Holderbank, Kestenholz, Neuendorf, Niederbuchsiten, Oensingen
- Website: www.oberbuchsiten.ch

Oberbuchsiten is a municipality in the district of Gäu in the canton of Solothurn in Switzerland.

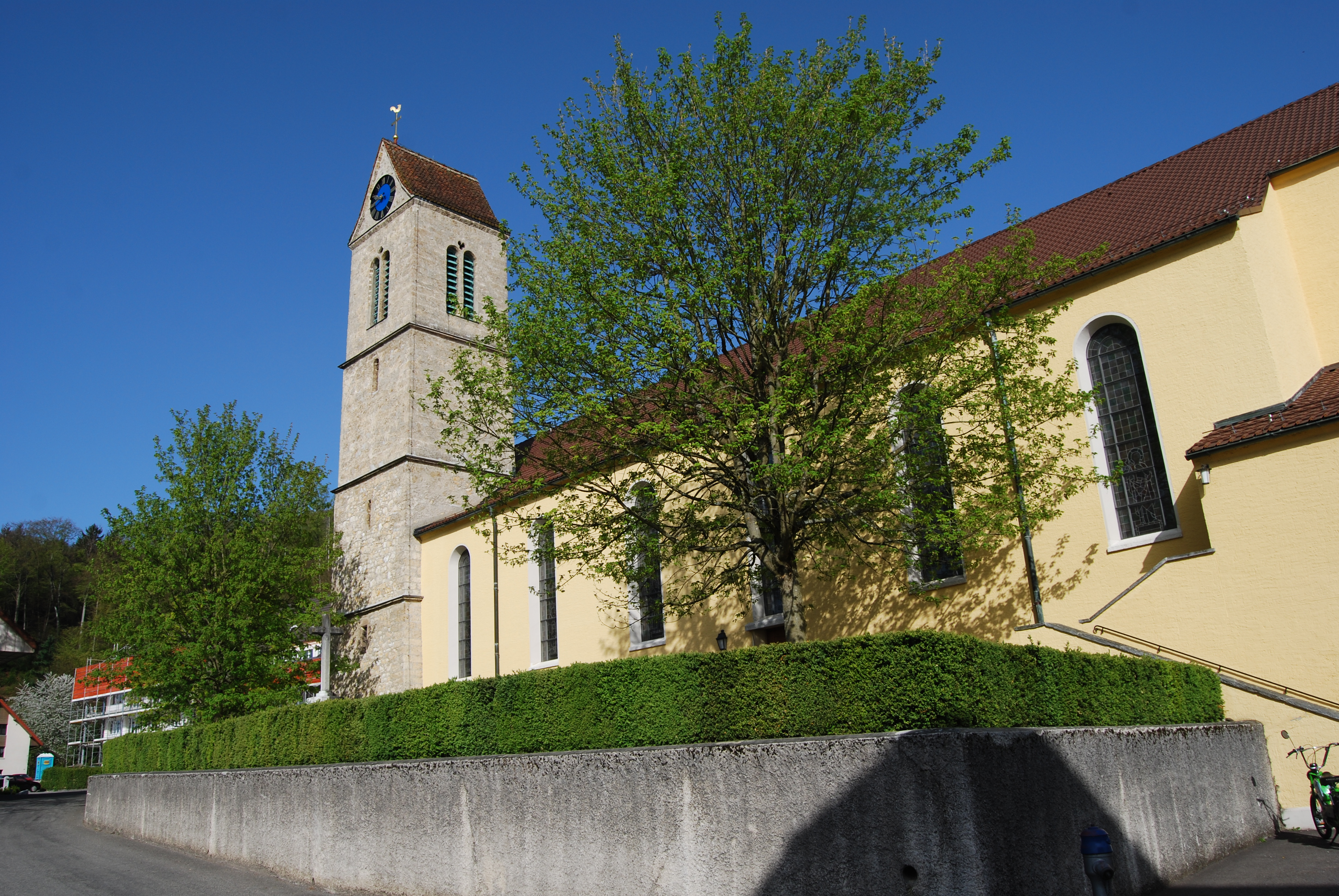
Oberbuchsiten

== History ==
Oberbuchsiten is first mentioned in 1040 as vico Buxita. In 1308 it was mentioned as ze Obern Buchsiten.

== Geography ==
Aerial view (1953)

Oberbuchsiten has an area, as of 2009, of 9.4 square kilometers (3.6 sq mi). Of this area, 3.62 km^{2} (1.40 sq mi) or 38.5% is used for agricultural purposes, while 4.67 km^{2} (1.80 sq mi) or 49.7% is forested. Of the rest of the land, 1.03 km^{2} (0.40 sq mi) or 11.0% is settled (buildings or roads), 0.04 km^{2} (9.9 acres) or 0.4% is either rivers or lakes and 0.02 km^{2} (4.9 acres) or 0.2% is unproductive land.

Of the built up area, industrial buildings made up 1.7% of the total area while housing and buildings made up 4.8% and transportation infrastructure made up 3.6%. Out of the forested land, 47.2% of the total land area is heavily forested and 2.4% is covered with orchards or small clusters of trees. Of the agricultural land, 21.7% is used for growing crops and 7.4% is pastures and 8.7% is used for alpine pastures. All the water in the municipality is flowing water.

The municipality is located in the Gäu district, on the alluvial fan of the Mülibach at the foot of the Jura Mountains.

== Coat of arms ==
The blazon of the municipal coat of arms is Or a Box Tree Vert issuant from a Mount of 3 Coupeaux of the same.

== Demographics ==
Oberbuchsiten has a population (as of December 2020) of 2,296. As of 2008, 21.0% of the population are resident foreign nationals. Over the last 10 years (1999–2009 ) the population has changed at a rate of 3.3%.

Most of the population (as of 2000) speaks German (1,564 or 85.0%), with Albanian being second most common (79 or 4.3%) and Italian being third (41 or 2.2%). There are 15 people who speak French and 1 person who speaks Romansh.

As of 2008, the gender distribution of the population was 49.5% male and 50.5% female. The population was made up of 692 Swiss men (37.1% of the population) and 230 (12.3%) non-Swiss men. There were 781 Swiss women (41.9%) and 161 (8.6%) non-Swiss women. Of the population in the municipality 578 or about 31.4% were born in Oberbuchsiten and lived there in 2000. There were 463 or 25.1% who were born in the same canton, while 401 or 21.8% were born somewhere else in Switzerland, and 282 or 15.3% were born outside of Switzerland.

In 2008 there were 15 live births to Swiss citizens and 6 births to non-Swiss citizens, and in same time span there were 15 deaths of Swiss citizens. Ignoring immigration and emigration, the population of Swiss citizens remained the same while the foreign population increased by 6. There were 4 Swiss men and 3 Swiss women who immigrated back to Switzerland. At the same time, there were 7 non-Swiss men and 12 non-Swiss women who immigrated from another country to Switzerland. The total Swiss population change in 2008 (from all sources, including moves across municipal borders) was a decrease of 4 and the non-Swiss population increased by 23 people. This represents a population growth rate of 1.0%.

The age distribution, as of 2000, in Oberbuchsiten is; 181 children or 9.8% of the population are between 0 and 6 years old and 304 teenagers or 16.5% are between 7 and 19. Of the adult population, 97 people or 5.3% of the population are between 20 and 24 years old. 642 people or 34.9% are between 25 and 44, and 392 people or 21.3% are between 45 and 64. The senior population distribution is 183 people or 9.9% of the population are between 65 and 79 years old and there are 42 people or 2.3% who are over 80.

As of 2000, there were 784 people who were single and never married in the municipality. There were 892 married individuals, 81 widows or widowers and 84 individuals who are divorced.

As of 2000, there were 709 private households in the municipality, and an average of 2.4 persons per household. There were 202 households that consist of only one person and 51 households with five or more people. Out of a total of 716 households that answered this question, 28.2% were households made up of just one person and there were 5 adults who lived with their parents. Of the rest of the households, there are 219 married couples without children, 244 married couples with children There were 28 single parents with a child or children. There were 11 households that were made up of unrelated people and 7 households that were made up of some sort of institution or another collective housing.

In 2000 there were 291 single family homes (or 65.5% of the total) out of a total of 444 inhabited buildings. There were 82 multi-family buildings (18.5%), along with 53 multi-purpose buildings that were mostly used for housing (11.9%) and 18 other use buildings (commercial or industrial) that also had some housing (4.1%). Of the single family homes 36 were built before 1919, while 39 were built between 1990 and 2000. The greatest number of single family homes (58) were built between 1981 and 1990.

In 2000 there were 753 apartments in the municipality. The most common apartment size was 4 rooms of which there were 215. There were 37 single room apartments and 301 apartments with five or more rooms. Of these apartments, a total of 680 apartments (90.3% of the total) were permanently occupied, while 35 apartments (4.6%) were seasonally occupied and 38 apartments (5.0%) were empty. As of 2009, the construction rate of new housing units was 2.7 new units per 1000 residents. The vacancy rate for the municipality, in 2010, was 2.08%.

The historical population is given in the following chart:

== Sights ==
The entire village of Oberbuchsiten is part of the Inventory of Swiss Heritage Sites.

== Politics ==
In the 2007 federal election the most popular party was the CVP which received 33.2% of the vote. The next three most popular parties were the SVP (30.12%), the FDP (19.78%) and the SP (10.25%). In the federal election, a total of 618 votes were cast, and the voter turnout was 51.4%.

== Economy ==
As of 2010, Oberbuchsiten had an unemployment rate of 3.4%. As of 2008, there were 29 people employed in the primary economic sector and about 10 businesses involved in this sector. 207 people were employed in the secondary sector and there were 23 businesses in this sector. 371 people were employed in the tertiary sector, with 52 businesses in this sector. There were 985 residents of the municipality who were employed in some capacity, of which females made up 43.9% of the workforce.

In 2008 the total number of full-time equivalent jobs was 525. The number of jobs in the primary sector was 18, of which 11 were in agriculture and 7 were in forestry or lumber production. The number of jobs in the secondary sector was 193 of which 66 or (34.2%) were in manufacturing and 124 (64.2%) were in construction. The number of jobs in the tertiary sector was 314. In the tertiary sector; 100 or 31.8% were in wholesale or retail sales or the repair of motor vehicles, 41 or 13.1% were in the movement and storage of goods, 26 or 8.3% were in a hotel or restaurant, 1 was in the information industry, 4 or 1.3% were the insurance or financial industry, 46 or 14.6% were technical professionals or scientists, 11 or 3.5% were in education and 25 or 8.0% were in health care.

In 2000, there were 272 workers who commuted into the municipality and 789 workers who commuted away. The municipality is a net exporter of workers, with about 2.9 workers leaving the municipality for every one entering. Of the working population, 13.8% used public transportation to get to work, and 64% used a private car.

== Religion ==
From the 2000 census, 1,009 or 54.8% were Roman Catholic, while 386 or 21.0% belonged to the Swiss Reformed Church. Of the rest of the population, there were 19 members of an Orthodox church (or about 1.03% of the population), there were 4 individuals (or about 0.22% of the population) who belonged to the Christian Catholic Church, and there were 19 individuals (or about 1.03% of the population) who belonged to another Christian church. There were 98 (or about 5.32% of the population) who were Islamic. There were 5 individuals who were Buddhist, 7 individuals who were Hindu and 1 individual who belonged to another church. 177 (or about 9.61% of the population) belonged to no church, are agnostic or atheist, and 116 individuals (or about 6.30% of the population) did not answer the question.

== Education ==
In Oberbuchsiten about 690 or (37.5%) of the population have completed non-mandatory upper secondary education, and 162 or (8.8%) have completed additional higher education (either university or a Fachhochschule). Of the 162 who completed tertiary schooling, 70.4% were Swiss men, 19.8% were Swiss women, 6.2% were non-Swiss men and 3.7% were non-Swiss women.

During the 2010-2011 school year there were a total of 179 students in the Oberbuchsiten school system. The education system in the Canton of Solothurn allows young children to attend two years of non-obligatory Kindergarten. During that school year, there were 42 children in kindergarten. The canton's school system requires students to attend six years of primary school, with some of the children attending smaller, specialized classes. In the municipality there were 137 students in primary school. The secondary school program consists of three lower, obligatory years of schooling, followed by three to five years of optional, advanced schools. All the lower secondary students from Oberbuchsiten attend their school in a neighboring municipality.

As of 2000, there were 8 students in Oberbuchsiten who came from another municipality, while 122 residents attended schools outside the municipality.
