= Neuendorf, Switzerland =

Neuendorf
- Municipality
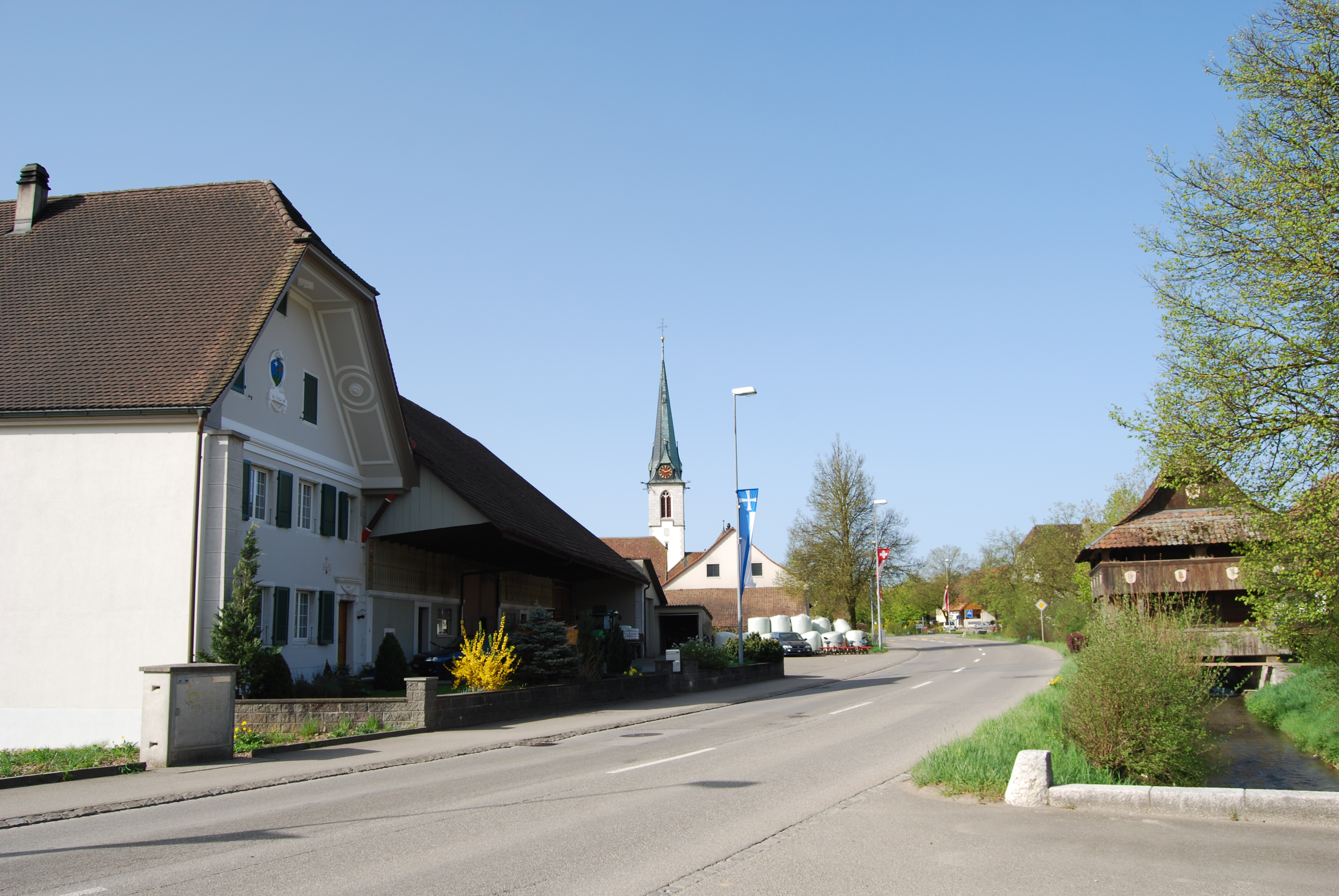

- Flag Coat of arms
- Location of Neuendorf
- Location within Switzerland Location within Canton of Solothurn
- Coordinates: 47°18′N 7°48′E
- Country: Switzerland
- Canton: Solothurn
- District: Gäu

Area
  - Total: 7.16 km^{2} (2.76 sq mi)
- Elevation: 437 m (1,434 ft)

Population (December 2020)
  - Total: 2,277
  - Density: 318/km^{2} (824/sq mi)
- Time zone: UTC+01:00 (CET)
  - Summer (DST): UTC+02:00 (CEST)
- Postal code: 4623
- SFOS number: 2404
- ISO 3166 code: CH-SO
- Surrounded by: Egerkingen, Fulenbach, Härkingen, Niederbuchsiten, Oberbuchsiten, Wolfwil
- Website: www.neuendorf.ch

Neuendorf (Swiss Standard German pronunciation: [ˈnɔʏənˌdɔrf]) is a municipality in the district of Gäu in the canton of Solothurn in Switzerland.

== History ==
Neuendorf is first mentioned in 1417 as Núwen Dorff.

== Geography ==
Aerial view (1962)

Neuendorf has an area, as of 2009, of 7.16 square kilometers (2.76 sq mi). Of this area, 3.51 km^{2} (1.36 sq mi) or 49.0% is used for agricultural purposes, while 2.37 km^{2} (0.92 sq mi) or 33.1% is forested. Of the rest of the land, 1.24 km^{2} (0.48 sq mi) or 17.3% is settled (buildings or roads), 0.01 km^{2} (2.5 acres) or 0.1% is either rivers or lakes.

Of the built up area, industrial buildings made up 4.3% of the total area while housing and buildings made up 6.0% and transportation infrastructure made up 4.6%. Power and water infrastructure as well as other special developed areas made up 1.4% of the area Out of the forested land, all of the forested land area is covered with heavy forests. Of the agricultural land, 41.3% is used for growing crops and 5.2% is pastures, while 2.5% is used for orchards or vine crops. All the water in the municipality is flowing water.

The municipality is located in the Gäu district, near the Dünnern river. It consists of the linear village of Neuendorf.

== Coat of arms ==
The blazon of the municipal coat of arms is Azure a Cross pattee couped Argent.

== Demographics ==
Neuendorf has a population (as of December 2020) of 2,277. As of 2008, 9.3% of the population are resident foreign nationals. Over the last 10 years (1999–2009 ) the population has changed at a rate of 9.1%.

Most of the population (as of 2000) speaks German (1,733 or 96.5%), with Albanian being second most common (14 or 0.8%) and Italian being third (11 or 0.6%). There are 8 people who speak French.

As of 2008, the gender distribution of the population was 50.5% male and 49.5% female. The population was made up of 879 Swiss men (45.1% of the population) and 106 (5.4%) non-Swiss men. There were 880 Swiss women (45.1%) and 85 (4.4%) non-Swiss women. Of the population in the municipality 698 or about 38.9% were born in Neuendorf and lived there in 2000. There were 467 or 26.0% who were born in the same canton, while 419 or 23.3% were born somewhere else in Switzerland, and 152 or 8.5% were born outside of Switzerland.

In 2008 there were 23 live births to Swiss citizens and 4 births to non-Swiss citizens, and in same time span there were 12 deaths of Swiss citizens. Ignoring immigration and emigration, the population of Swiss citizens increased by 11 while the foreign population increased by 4. There was 1 Swiss man who immigrated back to Switzerland and 1 Swiss woman who emigrated from Switzerland. At the same time, there were 12 non-Swiss men and 7 non-Swiss women who immigrated from another country to Switzerland. The total Swiss population change in 2008 (from all sources, including moves across municipal borders) was a decrease of 8 and the non-Swiss population increased by 13 people. This represents a population growth rate of 0.3%.

The age distribution, as of 2000, in Neuendorf is; 157 children or 8.7% of the population are between 0 and 6 years old and 352 teenagers or 19.6% are between 7 and 19. Of the adult population, 98 people or 5.5% of the population are between 20 and 24 years old. 626 people or 34.9% are between 25 and 44, and 375 people or 20.9% are between 45 and 64. The senior population distribution is 154 people or 8.6% of the population are between 65 and 79 years old and there are 34 people or 1.9% who are over 80.

As of 2000, there were 806 people who were single and never married in the municipality. There were 841 married individuals, 66 widows or widowers and 83 individuals who are divorced.

As of 2000, there were 679 private households in the municipality, and an average of 2.6 persons per household. There were 166 households that consist of only one person and 67 households with five or more people. Out of a total of 689 households that answered this question, 24.1% were households made up of just one person and there were 6 adults who lived with their parents. Of the rest of the households, there are 196 married couples without children, 265 married couples with children There were 34 single parents with a child or children. There were 12 households that were made up of unrelated people and 10 households that were made up of some sort of institution or another collective housing.

In 2000 there were 280 single family homes (or 66.4% of the total) out of a total of 422 inhabited buildings. There were 75 multi-family buildings (17.8%), along with 55 multi-purpose buildings that were mostly used for housing (13.0%) and 12 other use buildings (commercial or industrial) that also had some housing (2.8%). Of the single family homes 21 were built before 1919, while 72 were built between 1990 and 2000. The greatest number of single family homes (77) were built between 1981 and 1990.

In 2000 there were 727 apartments in the municipality. The most common apartment size was 4 rooms of which there were 208. There were 33 single room apartments and 289 apartments with five or more rooms. Of these apartments, a total of 664 apartments (91.3% of the total) were permanently occupied, while 29 apartments (4.0%) were seasonally occupied and 34 apartments (4.7%) were empty. As of 2009, the construction rate of new housing units was 1.6 new units per 1000 residents. The vacancy rate for the municipality, in 2010, was 4.27%.

The historical population is given in the following chart:

== Sights ==
The entire village of Neuendorf is part of the Inventory of Swiss Heritage Sites.

== Politics ==
In the 2007 federal election the most popular party was the CVP which received 36.55% of the vote. The next three most popular parties were the SVP (31.92%), the FDP (16.76%) and the SP (8.56%). In the federal election, a total of 716 votes were cast, and the voter turnout was 51.8%.

== Economy ==
As of 2010, Neuendorf had an unemployment rate of 2%. As of 2008, there were 71 people employed in the primary economic sector and about 21 businesses involved in this sector. 120 people were employed in the secondary sector and there were 23 businesses in this sector. 2,041 people were employed in the tertiary sector, with 57 businesses in this sector. There were 1,018 residents of the municipality who were employed in some capacity, of which females made up 43.0% of the workforce.

In 2008 the total number of full-time equivalent jobs was 1,994. The number of jobs in the primary sector was 46, of which 42 were in agriculture and 4 were in forestry or lumber production. The number of jobs in the secondary sector was 111 of which 66 or (59.5%) were in manufacturing, 2 or (1.8%) were in mining and 41 (36.9%) were in construction. The number of jobs in the tertiary sector was 1,837. In the tertiary sector; 661 or 36.0% were in wholesale or retail sales or the repair of motor vehicles, 1,069 or 58.2% were in the movement and storage of goods, 9 or 0.5% were in a hotel or restaurant, 2 or 0.1% were the insurance or financial industry, 10 or 0.5% were technical professionals or scientists, 54 or 2.9% were in education and 9 or 0.5% were in health care.

In 2000, there were 1,548 workers who commuted into the municipality and 709 workers who commuted away. The municipality is a net importer of workers, with about 2.2 workers entering the municipality for every one leaving. About 1.6% of the workforce coming into Neuendorf are coming from outside Switzerland. Of the working population, 10.8% used public transportation to get to work, and 63.7% used a private car.

== Religion ==
From the 2000 census, 1,163 or 64.8% were Roman Catholic, while 356 or 19.8% belonged to the Swiss Reformed Church. Of the rest of the population, there were 12 members of an Orthodox church (or about 0.67% of the population), there was 1 individual who belongs to the Christian Catholic Church, and there were 29 individuals (or about 1.61% of the population) who belonged to another Christian church. There was 1 individual who was Jewish, and 46 (or about 2.56% of the population) who were Islamic. 141 (or about 7.85% of the population) belonged to no church, are agnostic or atheist, and 47 individuals (or about 2.62% of the population) did not answer the question.

== Education ==
In Neuendorf about 739 or (41.1%) of the population have completed non-mandatory upper secondary education, and 163 or (9.1%) have completed additional higher education (either university or a Fachhochschule). Of the 163 who completed tertiary schooling, 70.6% were Swiss men, 20.9% were Swiss women, 4.9% were non-Swiss men and 3.7% were non-Swiss women.

During the 2010–2011 school year there were a total of 233 students in the Neuendorf school system. The education system in the Canton of Solothurn allows young children to attend two years of non-obligatory Kindergarten. During that school year, there were 52 children in kindergarten. The canton's school system requires students to attend six years of primary school, with some of the children attending smaller, specialized classes. In the municipality there were 181 students in primary school. The secondary school program consists of three lower, obligatory years of schooling, followed by three to five years of optional, advanced schools. All the lower secondary students from Neuendorf attend their school in a neighboring municipality.

As of 2000, there were 145 students in Neuendorf who came from another municipality, while 61 residents attended schools outside the municipality.
