= Härkingen =

- Municipality
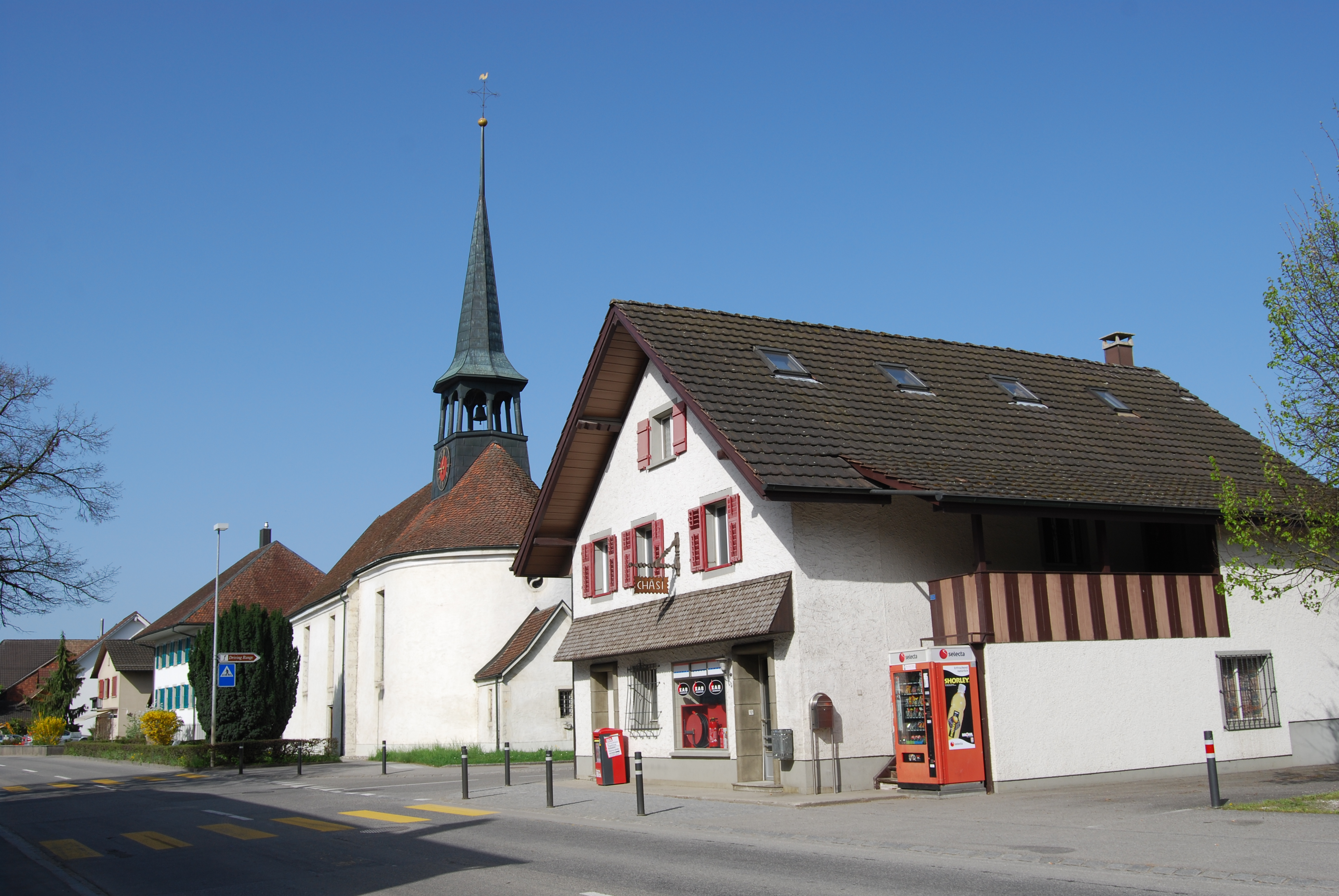

- Flag Coat of arms
- Location of Härkingen
- Location within Switzerland Location within Canton of Solothurn
- Coordinates: 47°19′N 7°49′E
- Country: Switzerland
- Canton: Solothurn
- District: Gäu

Area
  - Total: 5.50 km^{2} (2.12 sq mi)
- Elevation: 430 m (1,410 ft)

Population (December 2020)
  - Total: 1,644
  - Density: 299/km^{2} (774/sq mi)
- Time zone: UTC+01:00 (CET)
  - Summer (DST): UTC+02:00 (CEST)
- Postal code: 4624
- SFOS number: 2402
- ISO 3166 code: CH-SO
- Surrounded by: Egerkingen, Fulenbach, Gunzgen, Neuendorf
- Website: www.haerkingen.ch

Härkingen is a municipality in the district of Gäu in the canton of Solothurn in Switzerland.

== History ==
Härkingen is first mentioned in 1080 as quendam comitatum nomine Härichingen in pago Buchsgeowe situm (Kopie). In 1101 it was mentioned as 03 apud Harichingen.

== Geography ==
Aerial view (1970)

Härkingen has an area, as of 2009, of 5.5 square kilometers (2.1 sq mi). Of this area, 2.84 km^{2} (1.10 sq mi) or 51.6% is used for agricultural purposes, while 1.21 km^{2} (0.47 sq mi) or 22.0% is forested. Of the rest of the land, 1.52 km^{2} (0.59 sq mi) or 27.6% is settled (buildings or roads).

Of the built up area, industrial buildings made up 5.3% of the total area while housing and buildings made up 6.2% and transportation infrastructure made up 8.5%. Power and water infrastructure as well as other special developed areas made up 7.1% of the area Out of the forested land, 20.4% of the total land area is heavily forested and 1.6% is covered with orchards or small clusters of trees. Of the agricultural land, 44.9% is used for growing crops and 5.5% is pastures, while 1.3% is used for orchards or vine crops.

The municipality is located in the Gäu district, in the Dünnern valley south of the division of the A1 and A2 motorways.

== Coat of arms ==
The blazon of the municipal coat of arms is Azure an Oak Stump with two branches leaved and acorned Or rising from a Mount of 3 Coupeaux Vert.

== Demographics ==
Härkingen has a population (as of December 2020) of 1,644. As of 2008, 11.7% of the population are resident foreign nationals. Over the last 10 years (1999–2009 ) the population has changed at a rate of 9.9%.

Most of the population (as of 2000) speaks German (1,105 or 92.4%), with Italian being second most common (22 or 1.8%) and Albanian being third (20 or 1.7%). There are 7 people who speak French.

As of 2008, the gender distribution of the population was 51.8% male and 48.2% female. The population was made up of 581 Swiss men (44.4% of the population) and 98 (7.5%) non-Swiss men. There were 551 Swiss women (42.1%) and 80 (6.1%) non-Swiss women. Of the population in the municipality 414 or about 34.6% were born in Härkingen and lived there in 2000. There were 357 or 29.8% who were born in the same canton, while 265 or 22.2% were born somewhere else in Switzerland, and 131 or 11.0% were born outside of Switzerland.

In 2008 there were 14 live births to Swiss citizens and 1 birth to non-Swiss citizens, and in same time span there were 6 deaths of Swiss citizens. Ignoring immigration and emigration, the population of Swiss citizens increased by 8 while the foreign population increased by 1. There were 12 Swiss men and 4 Swiss women who immigrated back to Switzerland. At the same time, there were 3 non-Swiss men who emigrated from Switzerland to another country and 5 non-Swiss women who immigrated from another country to Switzerland. The total Swiss population change in 2008 (from all sources, including moves across municipal borders) was an increase of 44 and the non-Swiss population decreased by 5 people. This represents a population growth rate of 3.2%.

The age distribution, as of 2000, in Härkingen is; 103 children or 8.6% of the population are between 0 and 6 years old and 237 teenagers or 19.8% are between 7 and 19. Of the adult population, 43 people or 3.6% of the population are between 20 and 24 years old. 395 people or 33.0% are between 25 and 44, and 278 people or 23.2% are between 45 and 64. The senior population distribution is 101 people or 8.4% of the population are between 65 and 79 years old and there are 39 people or 3.3% who are over 80.

As of 2000, there were 499 people who were single and never married in the municipality. There were 593 married individuals, 48 widows or widowers and 56 individuals who are divorced.

As of 2000, there were 454 private households in the municipality, and an average of 2.6 persons per household. There were 111 households that consist of only one person and 41 households with five or more people. Out of a total of 467 households that answered this question, 23.8% were households made up of just one person and there were 4 adults who lived with their parents. Of the rest of the households, there are 130 married couples without children, 185 married couples with children There were 17 single parents with a child or children. There were 7 households that were made up of unrelated people and 13 households that were made up of some sort of institution or another collective housing.

In 2000 there were 233 single family homes (or 73.0% of the total) out of a total of 319 inhabited buildings. There were 42 multi-family buildings (13.2%), along with 31 multi-purpose buildings that were mostly used for housing (9.7%) and 13 other use buildings (commercial or industrial) that also had some housing (4.1%). Of the single family homes 14 were built before 1919, while 50 were built between 1990 and 2000. The greatest number of single family homes (60) were built between 1981 and 1990.

In 2000 there were 491 apartments in the municipality. The most common apartment size was 4 rooms of which there were 143. There were 25 single room apartments and 210 apartments with five or more rooms. Of these apartments, a total of 445 apartments (90.6% of the total) were permanently occupied, while 33 apartments (6.7%) were seasonally occupied and 13 apartments (2.6%) were empty. As of 2009, the construction rate of new housing units was 10 new units per 1000 residents. The vacancy rate for the municipality, in 2010, was 1.05%.

The historical population is given in the following chart:

== Politics ==
In the 2007 federal election the most popular party was the SVP which received 33.59% of the vote. The next three most popular parties were the CVP (26.19%), the FDP (19.72%) and the SP (13.53%). In the federal election, a total of 495 votes were cast, and the voter turnout was 56.6%.

== Economy ==
As of 2010, Härkingen had an unemployment rate of 2.7%. As of 2008, there were 31 people employed in the primary economic sector and about 10 businesses involved in this sector. 255 people were employed in the secondary sector and there were 30 businesses in this sector. 1,487 people were employed in the tertiary sector, with 90 businesses in this sector. There were 646 residents of the municipality who were employed in some capacity, of which females made up 39.9% of the workforce.

In 2008 the total number of full-time equivalent jobs was 1,598. The number of jobs in the primary sector was 22, all of which were in agriculture. The number of jobs in the secondary sector was 240 of which 110 or (45.8%) were in manufacturing, 9 or (3.8%) were in mining and 115 (47.9%) were in construction. The number of jobs in the tertiary sector was 1,336. In the tertiary sector; 307 or 23.0% were in wholesale or retail sales or the repair of motor vehicles, 879 or 65.8% were in the movement and storage of goods, 37 or 2.8% were in a hotel or restaurant, 67 or 5.0% were in the information industry, 2 or 0.1% were the insurance or financial industry, 13 or 1.0% were technical professionals or scientists, 6 or 0.4% were in education and 12 or 0.9% were in health care.

In 2000, there were 1,308 workers who commuted into the municipality and 469 workers who commuted away. The municipality is a net importer of workers, with about 2.8 workers entering the municipality for every one leaving. Of the working population, 9.8% used public transportation to get to work, and 64.4% used a private car.

== Religion ==
From the 2000 census, 720 or 60.2% were Roman Catholic, while 252 or 21.1% belonged to the Swiss Reformed Church. Of the rest of the population, there were 15 members of an Orthodox church (or about 1.25% of the population), there were 2 individuals (or about 0.17% of the population) who belonged to the Christian Catholic Church, and there were 9 individuals (or about 0.75% of the population) who belonged to another Christian church. There were 20 (or about 1.67% of the population) who were Islamic. There were 5 individuals who were Buddhist. 146 (or about 12.21% of the population) belonged to no church, are agnostic or atheist, and 27 individuals (or about 2.26% of the population) did not answer the question.

== Education ==
In Härkingen about 442 or (37.0%) of the population have completed non-mandatory upper secondary education, and 126 or (10.5%) have completed additional higher education (either university or a Fachhochschule). Of the 126 who completed tertiary schooling, 71.4% were Swiss men, 15.9% were Swiss women, 9.5% were non-Swiss men.

During the 2010-2011 school year there were a total of 95 students in the Härkingen school system. The education system in the Canton of Solothurn allows young children to attend two years of non-obligatory Kindergarten. During that school year, there were 19 children in kindergarten. The canton's school system requires students to attend six years of primary school, with some of the children attending smaller, specialized classes. In the municipality there were 76 students in primary school. The secondary school program consists of three lower, obligatory years of schooling, followed by three to five years of optional, advanced schools. All the lower secondary students from Härkingen attend their school in a neighboring municipality.

As of 2000, there were 4 students in Härkingen who came from another municipality, while 89 residents attended schools outside the municipality.

== Transport ==
Härkingen respectively Niederbipp are scheduled as one of the eight hubs of the proposed Cargo Sous Terrain, an underground cargo transport system those first phase is planned by the early 2030s.
