= Wynau =

- Municipality
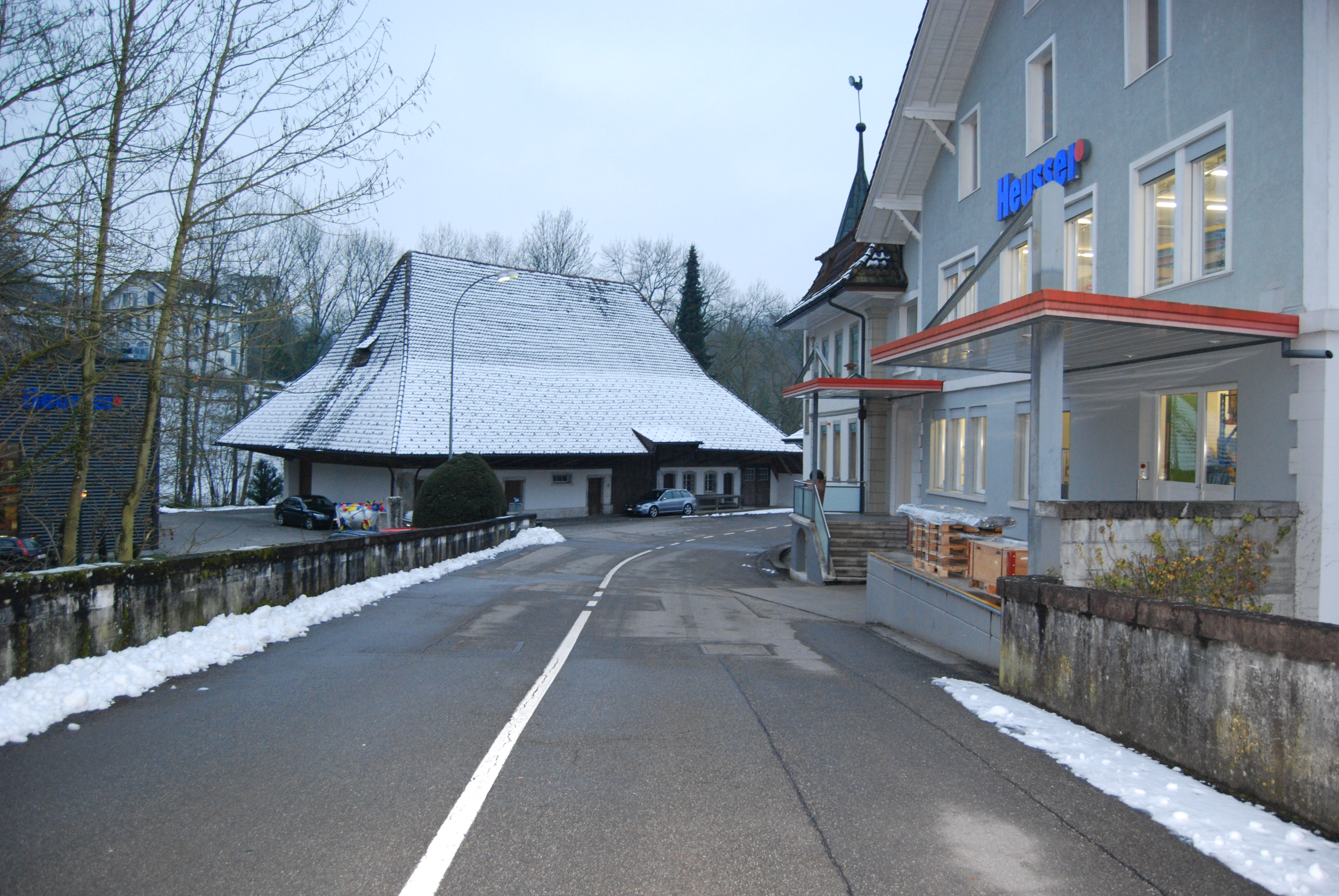
- Wynau village

- Flag Coat of arms
- Location of Wynau
- Location within Switzerland Location within Canton of Bern
- Coordinates: 47°15′N 7°48′E
- Country: Switzerland
- Canton: Bern
- District: Oberaargau

Area
  - Total: 5.1 km^{2} (2.0 sq mi)
- Elevation: 414 m (1,358 ft)

Population (December 2020)
  - Total: 1,624
  - Density: 320/km^{2} (820/sq mi)
- Time zone: UTC+01:00 (CET)
  - Summer (DST): UTC+02:00 (CEST)
- Postal code: 4923
- SFOS number: 345
- ISO 3166 code: CH-BE
- Surrounded by: Aarwangen, Murgenthal (AG), Roggwil, Schwarzhäusern, Wolfwil (SO)
- Website: www.wynau.ch

Wynau is a municipality in the Oberaargau administrative district in the canton of Bern in Switzerland.

== History ==
Aerial view by Walter Mittelholzer (1918–1937)

Wynau is first mentioned in 1201 as Wimenouwe.

Evidence of prehistoric settlements at Wynau include; individual Bronze Age items along the Aare river, the remains of a Roman manor at Hoferrain-Birchi and a sunken Roman ship with a rudder in the Aare. Possibly medieval graves have been found on the Höchi along with clearly medieval graves at Aegerten.

During the 13th and 14th centuries, the main landholders were the local nobles, the Lord of Bechburg, the Count of Falkenstein and the Knight of Aarwangen. Over time St. Urban's Abbey acquired these nobles' land in Wynau. In 1406, Bern acquired land and rights in the region from the Counts of Kyburg. With that foothold, in 1413 Bern negotiated an agreement with St. Urban's which brought Wynau and the upper Murgenthal (Murg valley) under Bernese control. Following the 1798 French invasion, under the Helvetic Republic, it was part of the district of Langenthal. After the collapse of the Republic, in 1803, it was transferred to the Aarwangen district.

The church of St. Mauritius was first mentioned in 1201. The late-Romanesque basilica church was probably built in the 10th–11th century, on top of an older Carolingian building. From 1270–80 the church was expanded. During the Late Middle Ages it was the center of a deaconate within the Diocese of Constance which included the villages of Aarwangen (until 1577), Roggwil (until 1664) and Murgenthal (settlements of Balzenwil, Gruben and Walliswil until 1664, Riken and Glashütten until 1824).

Bern built a salt warehouse in the municipality, followed by a customs house on the border with the Canton of Aargau in 1800. During the 18th century, cottage industry cotton weaving and coal mining began to supplement agriculture in the local economy. After 1800, many of the farms changed from traditional agriculture to dairy and livestock production. In 1862 the Roggwil-Wynau railroad opened, which connected the village with the larger Bern-Olten railroad. However, very few businesses or industries settled in the municipality. A large proportion of the population commuted and still commutes to Langenthal and Roggwil for work. In 1894–96 a power station was built on the river and in 1903 it was wholly acquired by the municipality. The power station was renovated in 1992–96.

== Geography ==
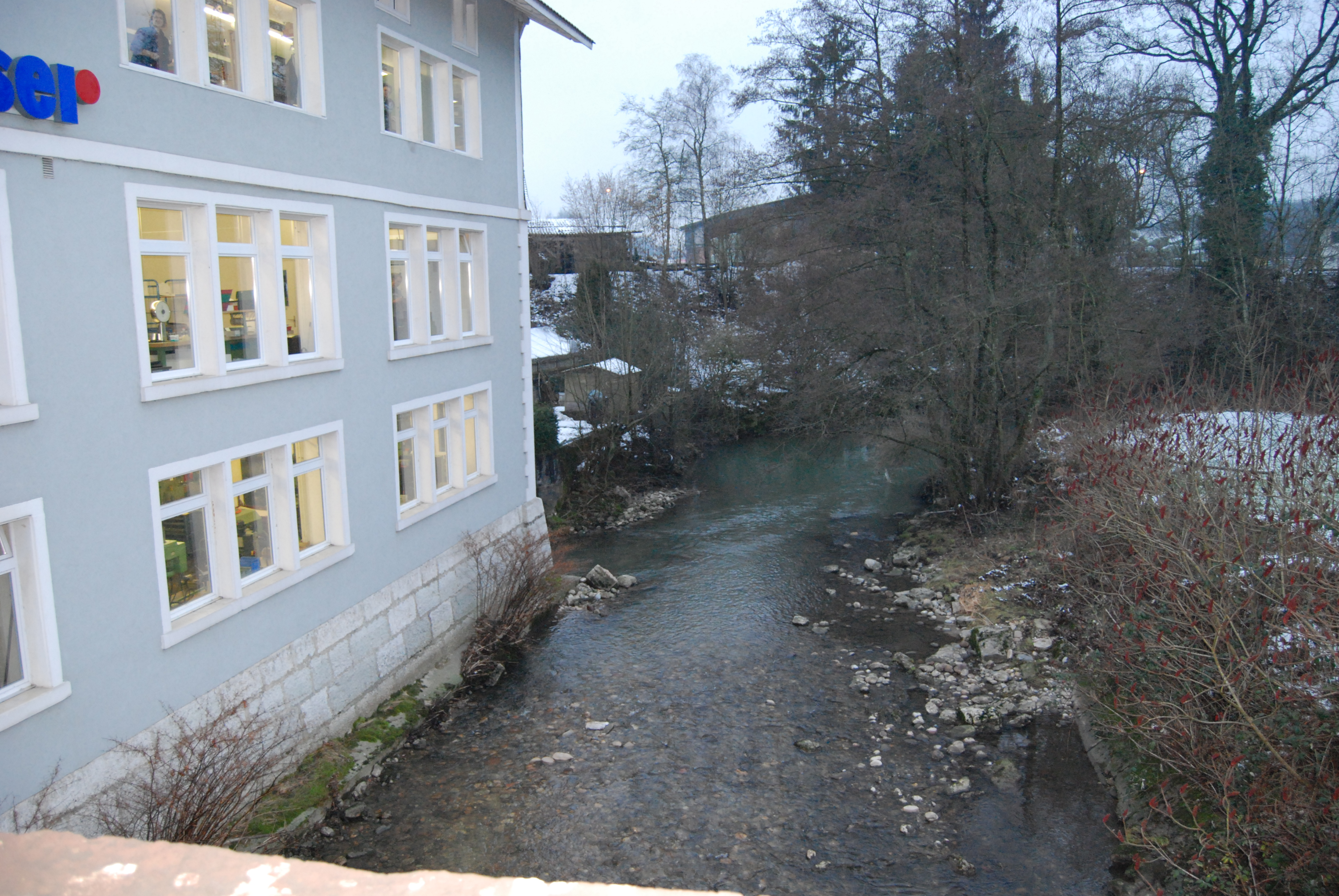
The Murg river in Wynau

Wynau has an area of 5.07 km^{2} (1.96 sq mi). Of this area, 1.91 km^{2} (0.74 mi^{2}) or 37.5% is used for agricultural purposes, while 2.03 km^{2} (0.78 mi^{2}) or 39.9% is forested. Of the rest of the land, 0.91 km^{2} (0.35 mi^{2}) or 17.9% is settled (buildings or roads), 0.27 km^{2} (0.10 mi^{2}) or 5.3% is either rivers or lakes.

Of the built up area, housing and buildings made up 8.3% and transportation infrastructure made up 3.9%. Power and water infrastructure as well as other special developed areas made up 3.7% of the area Out of the forested land, 38.3% of the total land area is heavily forested and 1.6% is covered with orchards or small clusters of trees. Of the agricultural land, 27.3% is used for growing crops and 7.3% is pastures, while 2.9% is used for orchards or vine crops. All the water in the municipality is flowing water.

The municipality is located between the Aare and Murg rivers and the heights known as the Höchi. It consists of the village sections of Dorf, Ägerten, Hubel, Birch and Einschlag and the hamlets of Ober-Wynau und Ober-Murgenthal.

On 31 December 2009 Amtsbezirk Aarwangen, the municipality's former district, was dissolved. On the following day, 1 January 2010, it joined the newly created Verwaltungskreis Oberaargau.

== Coat of arms ==
The blazon of the municipal coat of arms is Argent a grape Azure slipped and leaved Vert. This may be an example of canting with the grapes symbolizing wine (German: Wein) which is pronounced similar to Wynau.

== Demographics ==
Wynau has a population (as of December 2020) of 1,624. As of 2010, 17.0% of the population are resident foreign nationals. Over the last 10 years (2000–2010) the population has changed at a rate of −6.9%. Migration accounted for −0.5%, while births and deaths accounted for −2.5%.

Most of the population (as of 2000) speaks German (1,416 or 89.4%) as their first language, Albanian is the second most common (67 or 4.2%) and Italian is the third (35 or 2.2%). There are 9 people who speak French and 1 person who speaks Romansh.

As of 2008, the population was 51.3% male and 48.7% female. The population was made up of 646 Swiss men (41.9% of the population) and 144 (9.4%) non-Swiss men. There were 632 Swiss women (41.0%) and 118 (7.7%) non-Swiss women. Of the population in the municipality, 466 or about 29.4% were born in Wynau and lived there in 2000. There were 484 or 30.6% who were born in the same canton, while 359 or 22.7% were born somewhere else in Switzerland, and 229 or 14.5% were born outside of Switzerland.

As of 2010, children and teenagers (0–19 years old) make up 18% of the population, while adults (20–64 years old) make up 64.2% and seniors (over 64 years old) make up 17.9%.

As of 2000, there were 602 people who were single and never married in the municipality. There were 808 married individuals, 95 widows or widowers and 79 individuals who are divorced.

As of 2000, there were 203 households that consist of only one person and 46 households with five or more people. In 2000, a total of 637 apartments (90.0% of the total) were permanently occupied, while 27 apartments (3.8%) were seasonally occupied and 44 apartments (6.2%) were empty. As of 2010, the construction rate of new housing units was 1.3 new units per 1000 residents. The vacancy rate for the municipality, in 2011, was 0.66%.

The historical population is given in the following chart:

== Heritage sites of national significance ==
The rectory, the Swiss Reformed church and the Speicherstöckli are listed as Swiss heritage site of national significance.

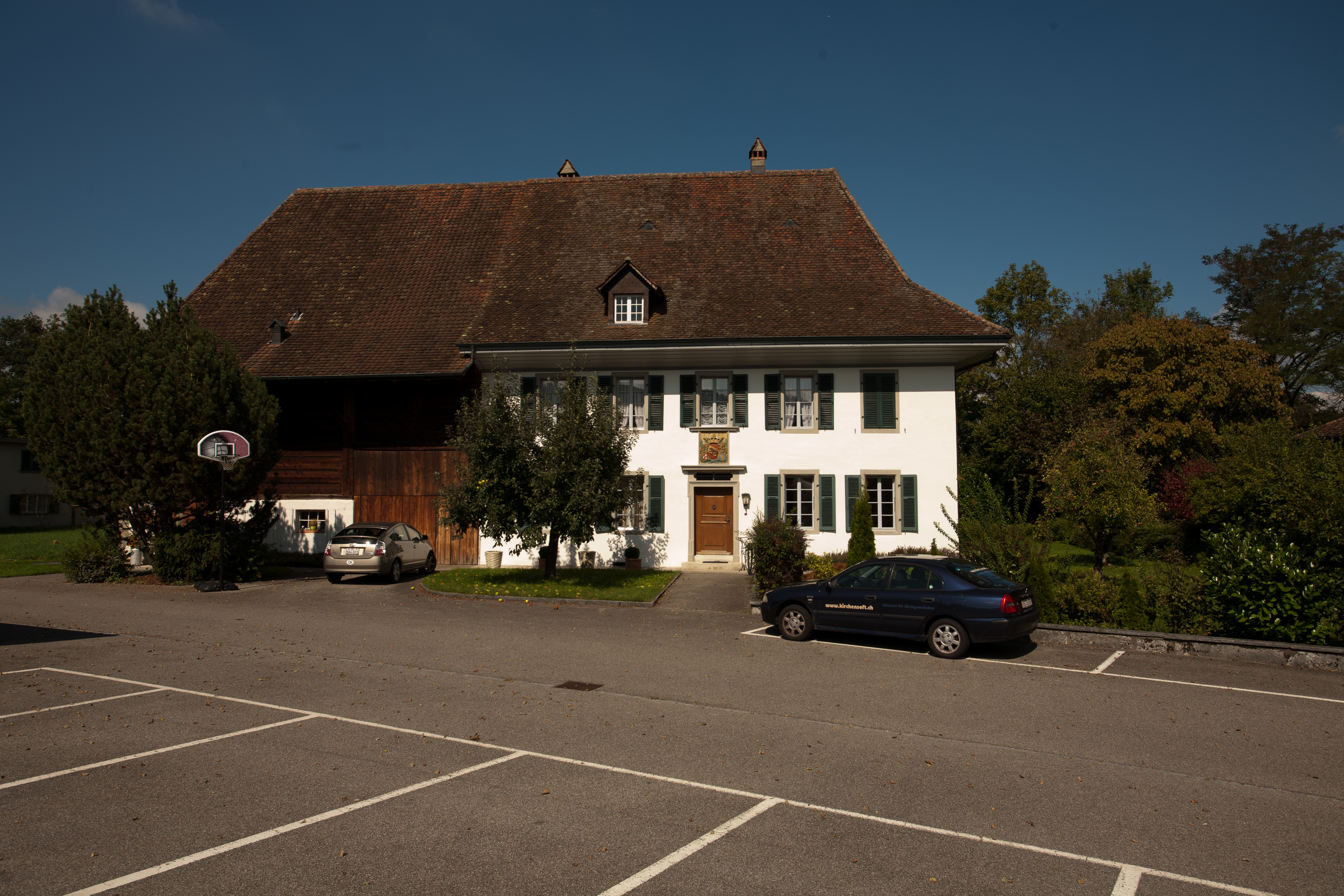
Rectory

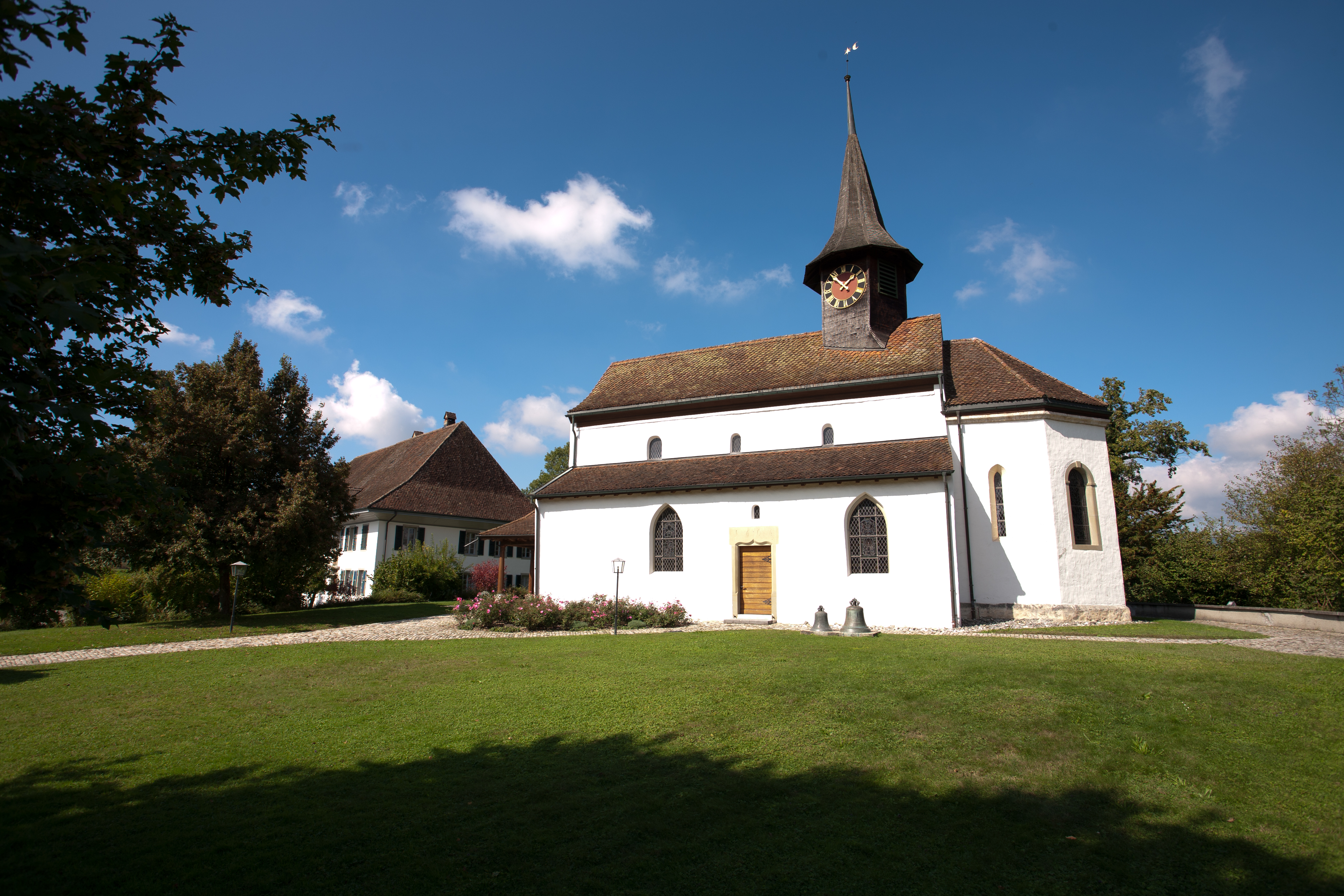
Wynau's Reformed church

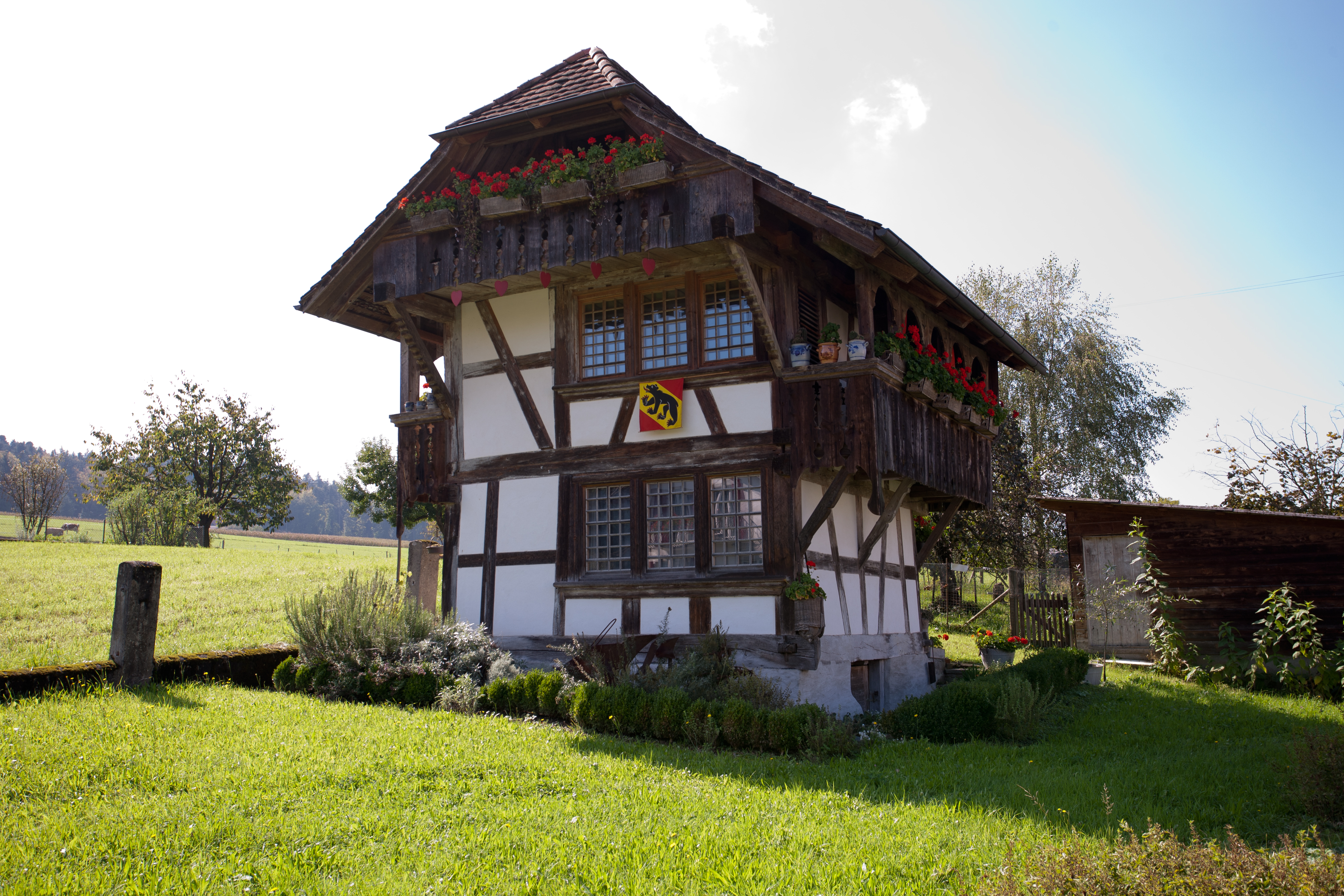
The Speicherstöckli

== Politics ==
In the 2011 federal election the most popular party was the SVP which received 35.3% of the vote. The next three most popular parties were the SPS (24%), the BDP Party (15.3%) and the FDP (9.2%). In the federal election, a total of 481 votes were cast, and the voter turnout was 43.5%.

== Economy ==
In 1894–96, the first hydroelectric power station on the river Aare was built at Wynau by the German company Siemens & Halske. In 1903, the "Elektricitätswerke Wynau AG" was sold to Langenthal and other municipalities (including Wynau) in the surrounding area. It was only then that Wynau began to buy electric energy from the power station located on its territory. The dam and powerhouse were completely reconstructed in 1992–96.

As of 2011, Wynau had an unemployment rate of 3.46%. As of 2008, there were a total of 490 people employed in the municipality. Of these, there were 45 people employed in the primary economic sector and about 16 businesses involved in this sector. 149 people were employed in the secondary sector and there were 21 businesses in this sector. 296 people were employed in the tertiary sector, with 43 businesses in this sector.

In 2008 there were a total of 420 full-time equivalent jobs. The number of jobs in the primary sector was 24, of which 22 were in agriculture and 2 were in forestry or lumber production. The number of jobs in the secondary sector was 139 of which 83 or (59.7%) were in manufacturing, 6 or (4.3%) were in mining and 31 (22.3%) were in construction. The number of jobs in the tertiary sector was 257. In the tertiary sector; 212 or 36.1% were in wholesale or retail sales or the repair of motor vehicles, 11 or 1.9% were in the movement and storage of goods, 52 or 8.9% were in a hotel or restaurant, 10 or 1.7% were the insurance or financial industry, 72 or 12.3% were technical professionals or scientists, 52 or 8.9% were in education and 86 or 14.7% were in health care.

In 2000, there were 202 workers who commuted into the municipality and 585 workers who commuted away. The municipality is a net exporter of workers, with about 2.9 workers leaving the municipality for every one entering. Of the working population, 10.4% used public transportation to get to work, and 60.8% used a private car.

== Religion ==
From the 2000 census, 240 or 15.2% were Roman Catholic, while 985 or 62.2% belonged to the Swiss Reformed Church. Of the rest of the population, there were 7 members of an Orthodox church (or about 0.44% of the population), and there were 138 individuals (or about 8.71% of the population) who belonged to another Christian church. There were 105 (or about 6.63% of the population) who were Islamic. There were 2 individuals who were Buddhist, 16 individuals who were Hindu and 1 individual who belonged to another church. 100 (or about 6.31% of the population) belonged to no church, are agnostic or atheist, and 58 individuals (or about 3.66% of the population) did not answer the question.

== Education ==
In Wynau about 606 or (38.3%) of the population have completed non-mandatory upper secondary education, and 135 or (8.5%) have completed additional higher education (either university or a Fachhochschule). Of the 135 who completed tertiary schooling, 71.1% were Swiss men, 18.5% were Swiss women, 8.9% were non-Swiss men.

The Canton of Bern school system provides one year of non-obligatory Kindergarten, followed by six years of Primary school. This is followed by three years of obligatory lower Secondary school where the students are separated according to ability and aptitude. Following the lower Secondary students may attend additional schooling or they may enter an apprenticeship.

During the 2009–10 school year, there were a total of 128 students attending classes in Wynau. There was one kindergarten class with a total of 24 students in the municipality. Of the kindergarten students, 58.3% were permanent or temporary residents of Switzerland (not citizens) and 54.2% have a different mother language than the classroom language. The municipality had 4 primary classes and 87 students. Of the primary students, 24.1% were permanent or temporary residents of Switzerland (not citizens) and 37.9% have a different mother language than the classroom language. During the same year, there were 2 lower secondary classes with a total of 17 students. There were 41.2% who were permanent or temporary residents of Switzerland (not citizens) and 47.1% have a different mother language than the classroom language.

As of 2000, there were 48 students in Wynau who came from another municipality, while 80 residents attended schools outside the municipality.

== Climate ==
Climate data for Wynau, elevation 422 m (1,385 ft), (1991–2020)
Month	Jan	Feb	Mar	Apr	May	Jun	Jul	Aug	Sep	Oct	Nov	Dec	Year
Mean daily maximum °C (°F)	3.4 (38.1)	5.5 (41.9)	10.8 (51.4)	15.3 (59.5)	19.5 (67.1)	23.3 (73.9)	25.2 (77.4)	24.8 (76.6)	20.0 (68.0)	14.2 (57.6)	7.7 (45.9)	3.8 (38.8)	14.5 (58.1)
Daily mean °C (°F)	0.7 (33.3)	1.3 (34.3)	5.2 (41.4)	9.2 (48.6)	13.5 (56.3)	17.3 (63.1)	19.0 (66.2)	18.4 (65.1)	14.2 (57.6)	9.7 (49.5)	4.6 (40.3)	1.5 (34.7)	9.6 (49.3)
Mean daily minimum °C (°F)	−2.2 (28.0)	−2.5 (27.5)	0.2 (32.4)	3.3 (37.9)	7.8 (46.0)	11.6 (52.9)	13.3 (55.9)	13.1 (55.6)	9.5 (49.1)	6.1 (43.0)	1.7 (35.1)	−1.1 (30.0)	5.1 (41.2)
Average precipitation mm (inches)	82.7 (3.26)	66.8 (2.63)	73.7 (2.90)	75.6 (2.98)	110.5 (4.35)	103.4 (4.07)	117.0 (4.61)	115.0 (4.53)	89.5 (3.52)	89.6 (3.53)	82.4 (3.24)	100.7 (3.96)	1,106.9 (43.58)
Average precipitation days (≥ 1.0 mm)	10.2	9.3	9.8	9.8	12.2	10.9	11.1	11.3	9.2	10.5	10.5	11.6	126.4
Average relative humidity (%)	86	82	77	73	75	74	74	78	82	87	88	88	80
Mean monthly sunshine hours	38.8	75.7	133.7	170.0	192.0	218.9	239.6	214.4	153.4	89.6	40.6	29.4	1,596.1
Percentage possible sunshine	17	30	40	45	44	49	54	53	45	31	18	14	40
Source 1: NOAA
Source 2: MeteoSwiss
