= Fulenbach =

- Municipality
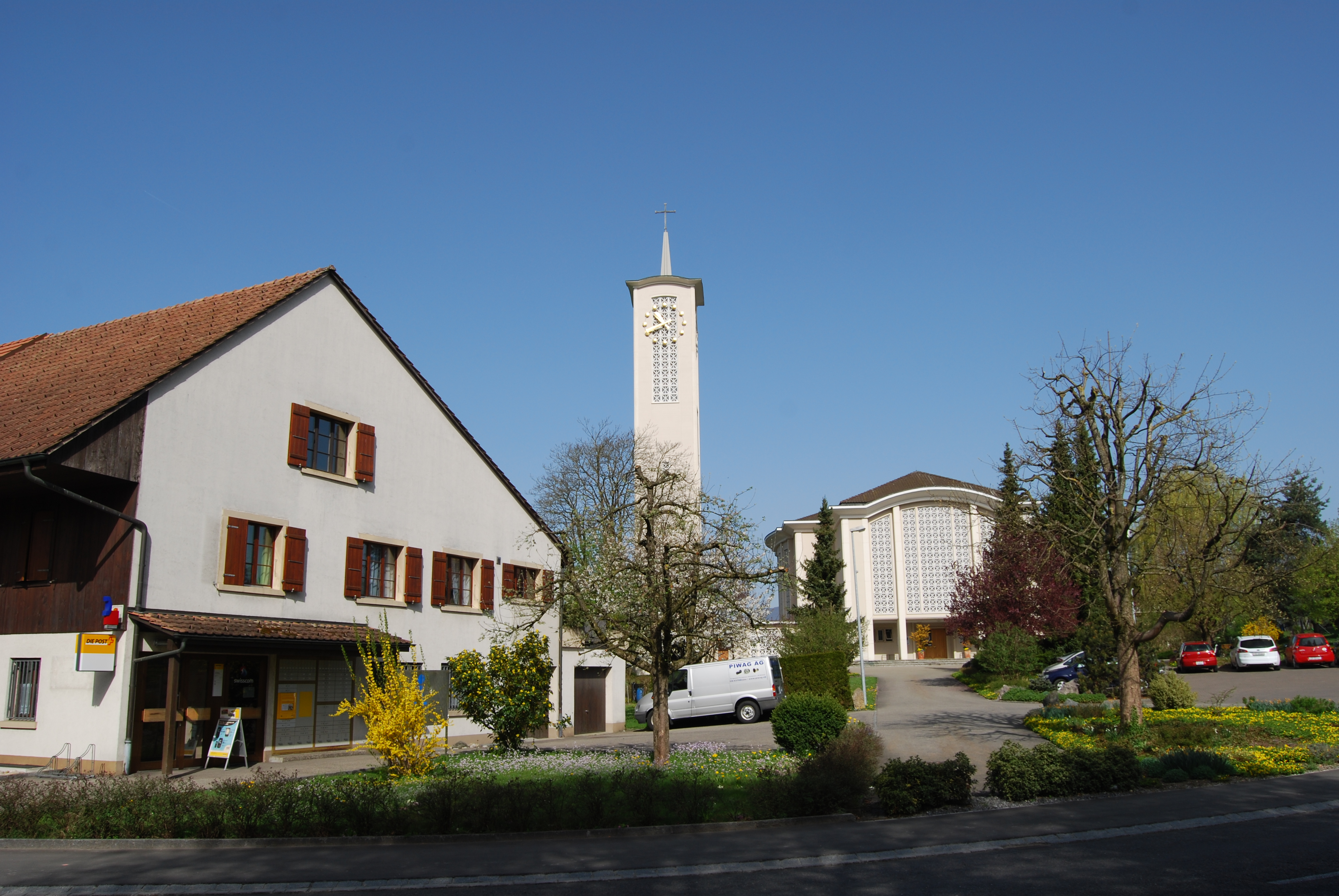
- The Catholic church in Fulenbach village

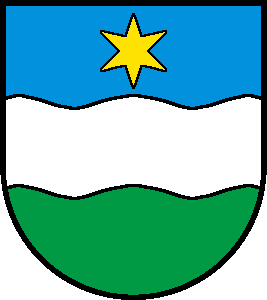
- Coat of arms
- Location of Fulenbach
- Location within Switzerland Location within Canton of Solothurn
- Coordinates: 47°17′N 7°50′E
- Country: Switzerland
- Canton: Solothurn
- District: Olten

Area
  - Total: 4.52 km^{2} (1.75 sq mi)
- Elevation: 429 m (1,407 ft)

Population (December 2020)
  - Total: 1,772
  - Density: 392/km^{2} (1,020/sq mi)
- Time zone: UTC+01:00 (CET)
  - Summer (DST): UTC+02:00 (CEST)
- Postal code: 4629
- SFOS number: 2575
- ISO 3166 code: CH-SO
- Surrounded by: Boningen, Gunzgen, Härkingen, Murgenthal (AG), Neuendorf, Wolfwil
- Website: fulenbach.ch

Fulenbach (High Alemannic: Fulebach) is a municipality in the district of Olten in the canton of Solothurn in Switzerland.

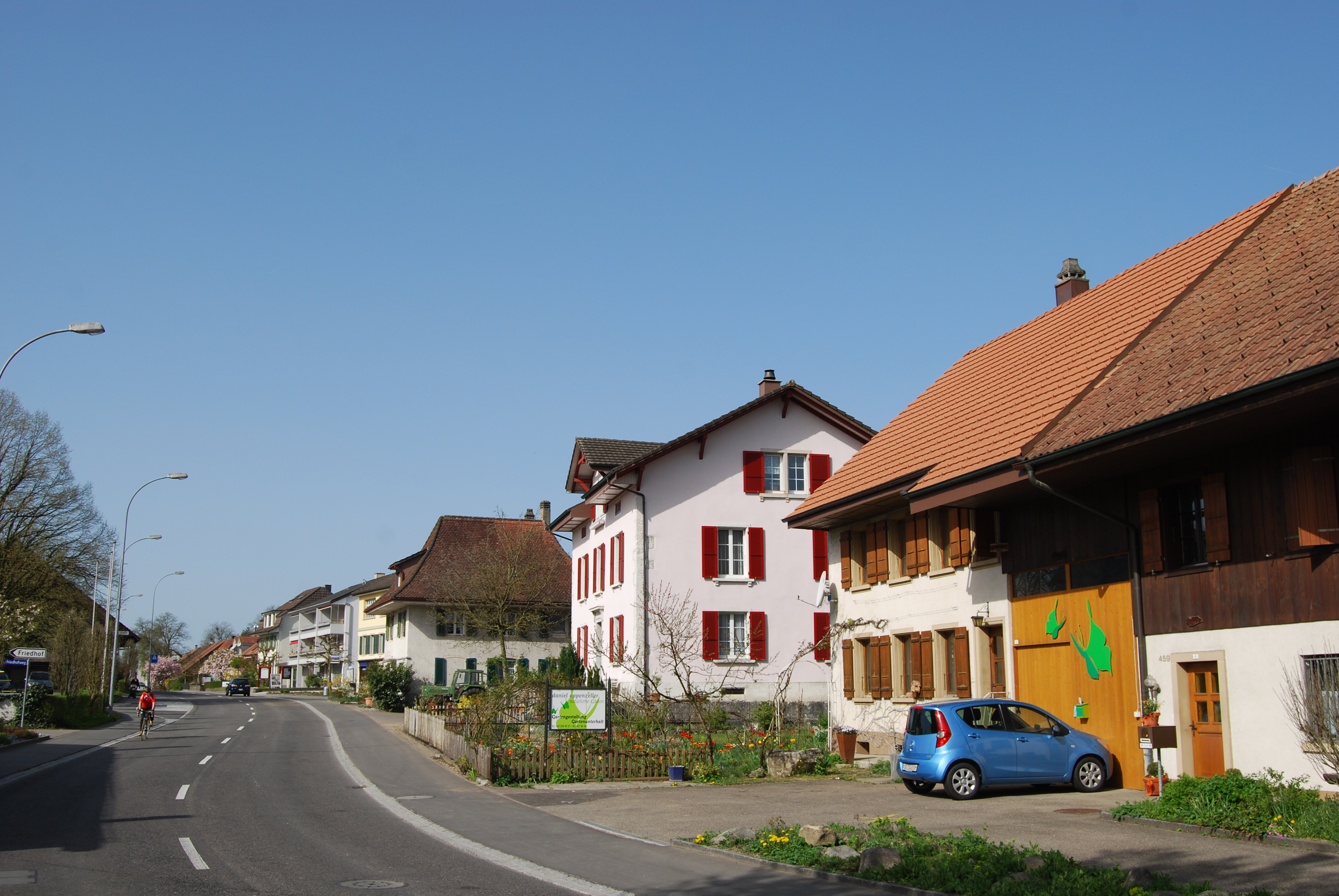
Fulenbach

== History ==
Fulenbach is first mentioned in 1226 as in villa Vulenbah. In 1260 it was mentioned as Fulenbach.

== Geography ==
Aerial view from 300 m by Walter Mittelholzer (1923)

Fulenbach has an area, as of 2009, of 4.52 square kilometers (1.75 sq mi). Of this area, 2.23 km^{2} (0.86 sq mi) or 49.3% is used for agricultural purposes, while 1.31 km^{2} (0.51 sq mi) or 29.0% is forested. Of the rest of the land, 0.77 km^{2} (0.30 sq mi) or 17.0% is settled (buildings or roads), 0.16 km^{2} (0.062 sq mi) or 3.5% is either rivers or lakes and 0.01 km^{2} (2.5 acres) or 0.2% is unproductive land.

Of the built up area, industrial buildings made up 1.5% of the total area while housing and buildings made up 11.1% and transportation infrastructure made up 2.9%. Out of the forested land, 27.7% of the total land area is heavily forested and 1.3% is covered with orchards or small clusters of trees. Of the agricultural land, 36.3% is used for growing crops and 11.7% is pastures, while 1.3% is used for orchards or vine crops. All the water in the municipality is flowing water.

The municipality is located in the Olten district, in the Aaregäu on a terrace near the Aare river. It consists of the linear village of Fulenbach, the settlement of Stadtacker (which grew up on the site of the medieval town of Fridau after its destruction in 1375) and the outer settlements of Ewigkeit, Färch and Fulenbacher Bad.

== Coat of arms ==
The blazon of the municipal coat of arms is Tierced per fess wavy Azure, Argent and Vert and in the first a Mullet Or.

== Demographics ==
Fulenbach has a population (as of December 2020) of 1,772. As of 2008, 8.7% of the population are resident foreign nationals. Over the last 10 years (1999–2009 ) the population has changed at a rate of 5.6%.

Most of the population (as of 2000) speaks German (1,362 or 93.9%), with Albanian being second most common (31 or 2.1%) and Italian being third (10 or 0.7%). There are 7 people who speak French and 3 people who speak Romansh.

As of 2008, the gender distribution of the population was 49.6% male and 50.4% female. The population was made up of 711 Swiss men (44.8% of the population) and 76 (4.8%) non-Swiss men. There were 742 Swiss women (46.7%) and 59 (3.7%) non-Swiss women. Of the population in the municipality 569 or about 39.2% were born in Fulenbach and lived there in 2000. There were 292 or 20.1% who were born in the same canton, while 420 or 29.0% were born somewhere else in Switzerland, and 131 or 9.0% were born outside of Switzerland.

In 2008 there were 14 live births to Swiss citizens and 1 birth to non-Swiss citizens, and in same time span there were 12 deaths of Swiss citizens. Ignoring immigration and emigration, the population of Swiss citizens increased by 2 while the foreign population increased by 1. There was 1 Swiss man and 1 Swiss woman who immigrated back to Switzerland. At the same time, there were 7 non-Swiss men and 4 non-Swiss women who immigrated from another country to Switzerland. The total Swiss population change in 2008 (from all sources, including moves across municipal borders) was an increase of 10 and the non-Swiss population increased by 17 people. This represents a population growth rate of 1.7%.

The age distribution, as of 2000, in Fulenbach is; 93 children or 6.4% of the population are between 0 and 6 years old and 270 teenagers or 18.6% are between 7 and 19. Of the adult population, 90 people or 6.2% of the population are between 20 and 24 years old. 444 people or 30.6% are between 25 and 44, and 376 people or 25.9% are between 45 and 64. The senior population distribution is 126 people or 8.7% of the population are between 65 and 79 years old and there are 51 people or 3.5% who are over 80.

As of 2000, there were 590 people who were single and never married in the municipality. There were 716 married individuals, 75 widows or widowers and 69 individuals who are divorced.

As of 2000, there were 564 private households in the municipality, and an average of 2.6 persons per household. There were 137 households that consist of only one person and 50 households with five or more people. Out of a total of 574 households that answered this question, 23.9% were households made up of just one person and there were 2 adults who lived with their parents. Of the rest of the households, there are 177 married couples without children, 214 married couples with children There were 27 single parents with a child or children. There were 7 households that were made up of unrelated people and 10 households that were made up of some sort of institution or another collective housing.

In 2000 there were 291 single family homes (or 71.9% of the total) out of a total of 405 inhabited buildings. There were 50 multi-family buildings (12.3%), along with 45 multi-purpose buildings that were mostly used for housing (11.1%) and 19 other use buildings (commercial or industrial) that also had some housing (4.7%). Of the single family homes 23 were built before 1919, while 27 were built between 1990 and 2000. The greatest number of single family homes (70) were built between 1981 and 1990.

In 2000 there were 589 apartments in the municipality. The most common apartment size was 4 rooms of which there were 176. There were 13 single room apartments and 269 apartments with five or more rooms. Of these apartments, a total of 556 apartments (94.4% of the total) were permanently occupied, while 20 apartments (3.4%) were seasonally occupied and 13 apartments (2.2%) were empty. As of 2009, the construction rate of new housing units was 5.7 new units per 1000 residents. The vacancy rate for the municipality, in 2010, was 1.97%.

The historical population is given in the following chart:

== Politics ==
In the 2007 federal election the most popular party was the CVP which received 29.43% of the vote. The next three most popular parties were the SVP (26.59%), the FDP (17.83%) and the SP (15.33%). In the federal election, a total of 625 votes were cast, and the voter turnout was 53.0%.

== Economy ==
As of 2010, Fulenbach had an unemployment rate of 2.7%. As of 2008, there were 51 people employed in the primary economic sector and about 17 businesses involved in this sector. 224 people were employed in the secondary sector and there were 27 businesses in this sector. 211 people were employed in the tertiary sector, with 44 businesses in this sector. There were 823 residents of the municipality who were employed in some capacity, of which females made up 41.9% of the workforce.

In 2008 the total number of full-time equivalent jobs was 407. The number of jobs in the primary sector was 38, of which 25 were in agriculture and 12 were in forestry or lumber production. The number of jobs in the secondary sector was 209 of which 124 or (59.3%) were in manufacturing and 85 (40.7%) were in construction. The number of jobs in the tertiary sector was 160. In the tertiary sector; 46 or 28.8% were in wholesale or retail sales or the repair of motor vehicles, 11 or 6.9% were in the movement and storage of goods, 42 or 26.3% were in a hotel or restaurant, 3 or 1.9% were in the information industry, 5 or 3.1% were the insurance or financial industry, 11 or 6.9% were technical professionals or scientists, 15 or 9.4% were in education and 8 or 5.0% were in health care.

In 2000, there were 224 workers who commuted into the municipality and 593 workers who commuted away. The municipality is a net exporter of workers, with about 2.6 workers leaving the municipality for every one entering. Of the working population, 12.5% used public transportation to get to work, and 60.4% used a private car.

== Religion ==
From the 2000 census, 851 or 58.7% were Roman Catholic, while 379 or 26.1% belonged to the Swiss Reformed Church. Of the rest of the population, there were 2 members of an Orthodox church (or about 0.14% of the population), there were 5 individuals (or about 0.34% of the population) who belonged to the Christian Catholic Church, and there were 18 individuals (or about 1.24% of the population) who belonged to another Christian church. There were 83 (or about 5.72% of the population) who were Islamic. There was 1 person who was Buddhist and 1 individual who belonged to another church. 70 (or about 4.83% of the population) belonged to no church, are agnostic or atheist, and 40 individuals (or about 2.76% of the population) did not answer the question.

== Education ==
In Fulenbach about 635 or (43.8%) of the population have completed non-mandatory upper secondary education, and 116 or (8.0%) have completed additional higher education (either university or a Fachhochschule). Of the 116 who completed tertiary schooling, 80.2% were Swiss men, 14.7% were Swiss women, 4.3% were non-Swiss men.

During the 2010–2011 school year there were a total of 157 students in the Fulenbach school system. The education system in the Canton of Solothurn allows young children to attend two years of non-obligatory Kindergarten. During that school year, there were 41 children in kindergarten. The canton's school system requires students to attend six years of primary school, with some of the children attending smaller, specialized classes. In the municipality there were 116 students in primary school. The secondary school program consists of three lower, obligatory years of schooling, followed by three to five years of optional, advanced schools. All the lower secondary students from Fulenbach attend their school in a neighboring municipality.

As of 2000, there were 40 students in Fulenbach who came from another municipality, while 105 residents attended schools outside the municipality.
