= Gunzgen =

- Municipality
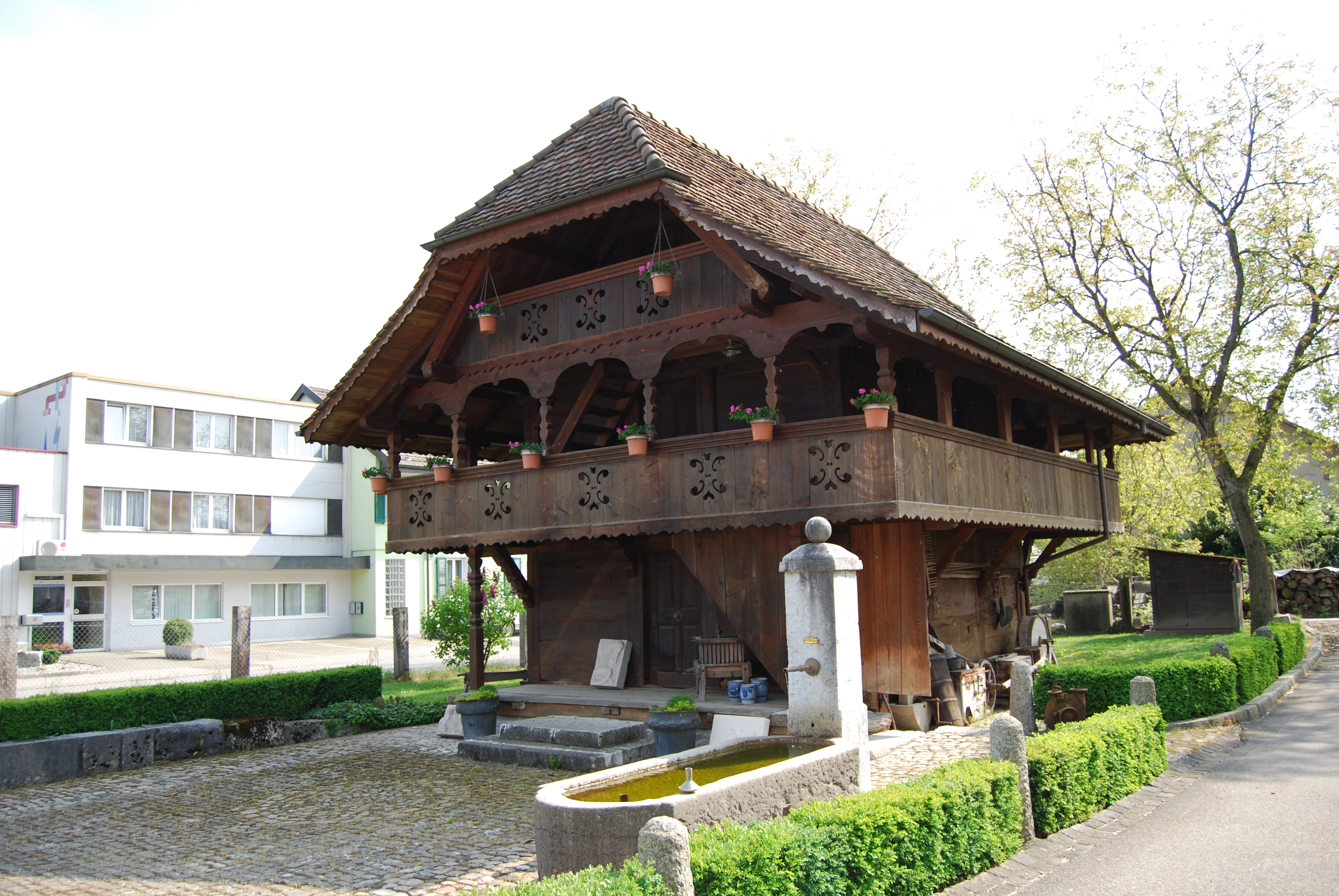
- Gunzgen village

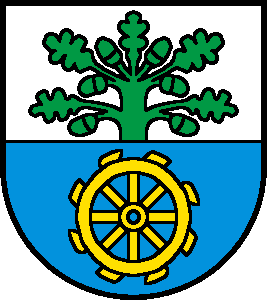
- Coat of arms
- Location of Gunzgen
- Location within Switzerland Location within Canton of Solothurn
- Coordinates: 47°19′N 7°50′E
- Country: Switzerland
- Canton: Solothurn
- District: Olten

Area
  - Total: 3.94 km^{2} (1.52 sq mi)
- Elevation: 429 m (1,407 ft)

Population (December 2020)
  - Total: 1,689
  - Density: 429/km^{2} (1,110/sq mi)
- Time zone: UTC+01:00 (CET)
  - Summer (DST): UTC+02:00 (CEST)
- Postal code: 4617
- SFOS number: 2578
- ISO 3166 code: CH-SO
- Surrounded by: Boningen, Egerkingen, Fulenbach, Hägendorf, Härkingen, Kappel
- Website: gunzgen.ch

Gunzgen is a municipality in the district of Olten in the canton of Solothurn in Switzerland.

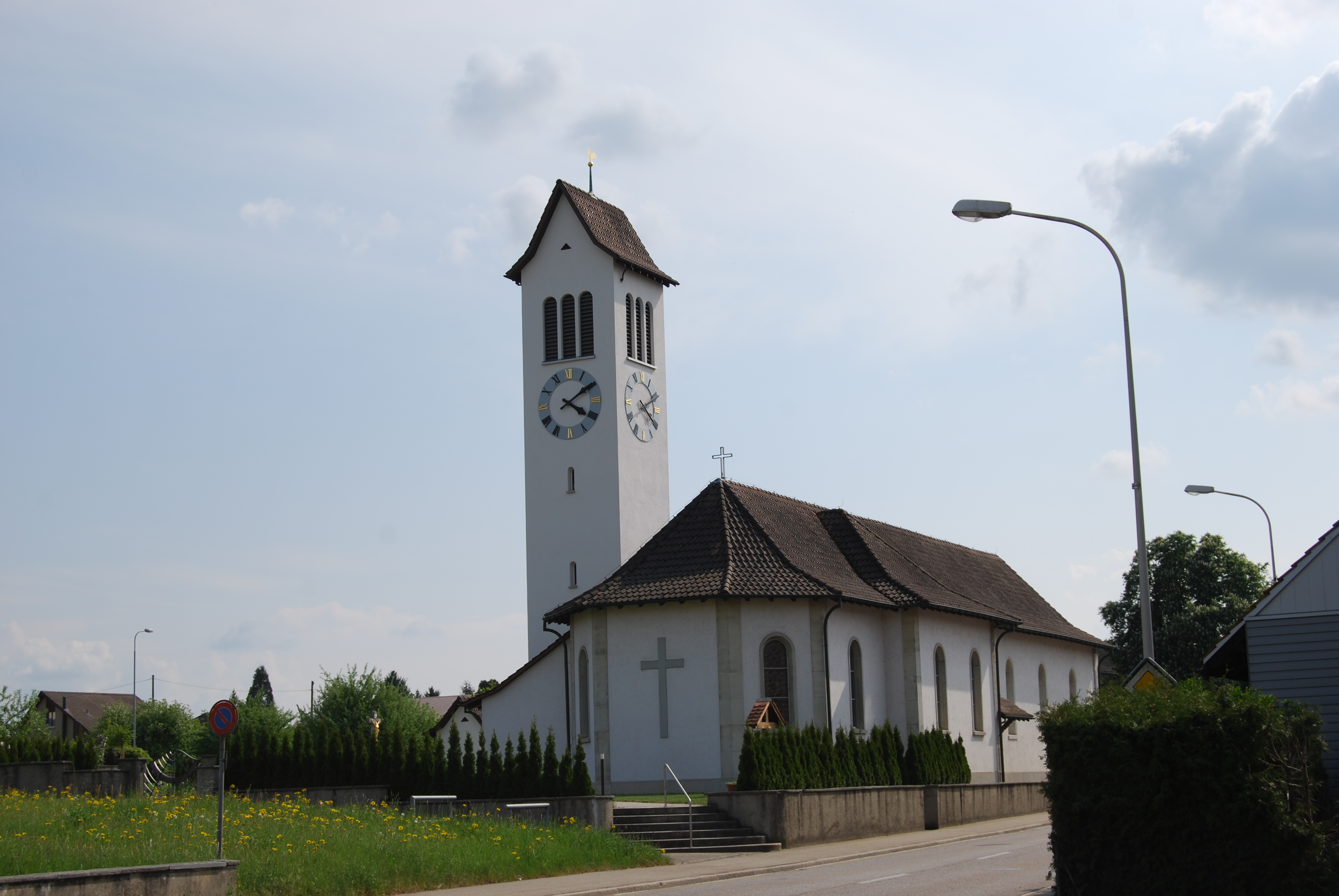
Gunzgen

== History ==
Gunzgen is first mentioned in 1226 as Gunzichon. In 1320 it was mentioned as Gunzkon.

== Geography ==
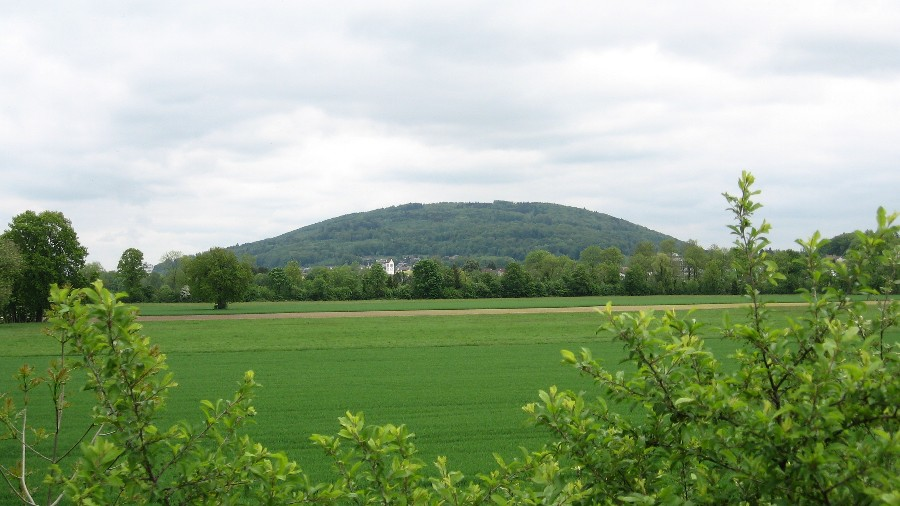
Mt. Born with Gunzgen at the base

Gunzgen has an area, as of 2009, of 3.94 square kilometers (1.52 sq mi). Of this area, 1.82 km^{2} (0.70 sq mi) or 46.2% is used for agricultural purposes, while 0.97 km^{2} (0.37 sq mi) or 24.6% is forested. Of the rest of the land, 1.08 km^{2} (0.42 sq mi) or 27.4% is settled (buildings or roads), 0.03 km^{2} (7.4 acres) or 0.8% is either rivers or lakes and 0.01 km^{2} (2.5 acres) or 0.3% is unproductive land.

Of the built up area, industrial buildings made up 6.3% of the total area while housing and buildings made up 7.9% and transportation infrastructure made up 7.6%. Power and water infrastructure as well as other special developed areas made up 5.3% of the area Out of the forested land, all of the forested land area is covered with heavy forests. Of the agricultural land, 32.2% is used for growing crops and 11.7% is pastures, while 2.3% is used for orchards or vine crops. Of the water in the municipality, 0.3% is in lakes and 0.5% is in rivers and streams.

The municipality is located in the Olten district, in the Mittelgäu along the Dünnern river. The municipal borders changed during the Dünnern River Correction in 1933–43. It consists of the linear village of Gunzgen and the settlement of Allmend which is separated from the main village by the A1 and A2 motorways.

== Coat of arms ==
The blazon of the municipal coat of arms is Per fess Argent an Oak issuant leaved and acorned Vert and Azure a Mill Wheel Or.

== Demographics ==
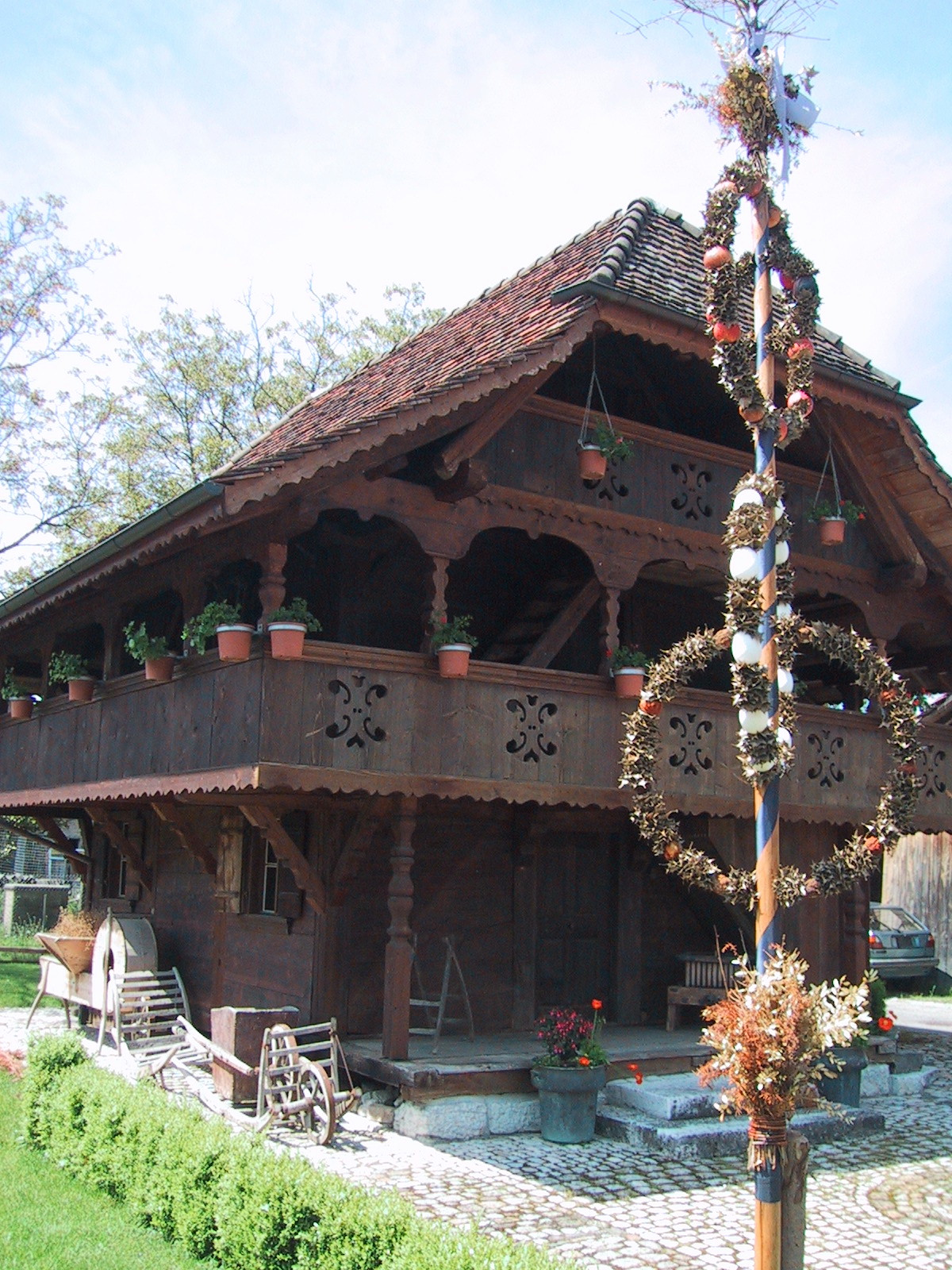
House in Gunzgen, along the main road

Gunzgen has a population (as of December 2020) of 1,689. As of 2008, 9.6% of the population are resident foreign nationals. Over the last 10 years (1999–2009 ) the population has changed at a rate of 13.8%.

Most of the population (as of 2000) speaks German (1,366 or 95.7%), with Italian being second most common (14 or 1.0%) and Italian being third (14 or 1.0%). There are 4 people who speak French and 2 people who speak Romansh.

As of 2008, the gender distribution of the population was 50.3% male and 49.7% female. The population was made up of 718 Swiss men (44.4% of the population) and 96 (5.9%) non-Swiss men. There were 716 Swiss women (44.3%) and 88 (5.4%) non-Swiss women. Of the population in the municipality 408 or about 28.6% were born in Gunzgen and lived there in 2000. There were 456 or 31.9% who were born in the same canton, while 393 or 27.5% were born somewhere else in Switzerland, and 125 or 8.8% were born outside of Switzerland.

In 2008 there were 13 live births to Swiss citizens and 1 birth to non-Swiss citizens, and in same time span there were 9 deaths of Swiss citizens. Ignoring immigration and emigration, the population of Swiss citizens increased by 4 while the foreign population increased by 1. There was 1 Swiss man who immigrated back to Switzerland and 1 Swiss woman who emigrated from Switzerland. At the same time, there were 3 non-Swiss men and 2 non-Swiss women who immigrated from another country to Switzerland. The total Swiss population change in 2008 (from all sources, including moves across municipal borders) was an increase of 13 and the non-Swiss population increased by 1 people. This represents a population growth rate of 0.9%.

The age distribution, as of 2000, in Gunzgen is; 121 children or 8.5% of the population are between 0 and 6 years old and 241 teenagers or 16.9% are between 7 and 19. Of the adult population, 67 people or 4.7% of the population are between 20 and 24 years old. 516 people or 36.1% are between 25 and 44, and 341 people or 23.9% are between 45 and 64. The senior population distribution is 130 people or 9.1% of the population are between 65 and 79 years old and there are 12 people or 0.8% who are over 80.

As of 2000, there were 580 people who were single and never married in the municipality. There were 714 married individuals, 59 widows or widowers and 75 individuals who are divorced.

As of 2000, there were 586 private households in the municipality, and an average of 2.4 persons per household. There were 166 households that consist of only one person and 41 households with five or more people. Out of a total of 595 households that answered this question, 27.9% were households made up of just one person and there were 4 adults who lived with their parents. Of the rest of the households, there are 198 married couples without children, 195 married couples with children There were 18 single parents with a child or children. There were 5 households that were made up of unrelated people and 9 households that were made up of some sort of institution or another collective housing.

In 2000 there were 250 single-family homes (or 69.8% of the total) out of a total of 358 inhabited buildings. There were 62 multi-family buildings (17.3%), along with 28 multi-purpose buildings that were mostly used for housing (7.8%) and 18 other use buildings (commercial or industrial) that also had some housing (5.0%). Of the single-family homes 18 were built before 1919, while 61 were built between 1990 and 2000. The greatest number of single-family homes (55) were built between 1981 and 1990.

In 2000 there were 634 apartments in the municipality. The most common apartment size was 4 rooms of which there were 196. There were 15 single-room apartments and 247 apartments with five or more rooms. Of these apartments, a total of 576 apartments (90.9% of the total) were permanently occupied, while 26 apartments (4.1%) were seasonally occupied and 32 apartments (5.0%) were empty. As of 2009, the construction rate of new housing units was 3.7 new units per 1000 residents. The vacancy rate for the municipality, in 2010, was 0%.

The historical population is given in the following chart:

== Politics ==
In the 2007 federal election the most popular party was the CVP which received 46.45% of the vote. The next three most popular parties were the SVP (24.42%), the FDP (12.43%) and the SP (12.09%). In the federal election, a total of 575 votes were cast, and the voter turnout was 49.8%.

== Economy ==
As of 2010, Gunzgen had an unemployment rate of 3%. As of 2008, there were 29 people employed in the primary economic sector and about 11 businesses involved in this sector. 207 people were employed in the secondary sector and there were 20 businesses in this sector. 537 people were employed in the tertiary sector, with 49 businesses in this sector. There were 826 residents of the municipality who were employed in some capacity, of which females made up 42.7% of the workforce.

In 2008 the total number of full-time equivalent jobs was 693. The number of jobs in the primary sector was 20, of which 17 were in agriculture and 3 were in forestry or lumber production. The number of jobs in the secondary sector was 197 of which 98 or (49.7%) were in manufacturing, 14 or (7.1%) were in mining and 81 (41.1%) were in construction. The number of jobs in the tertiary sector was 476. In the tertiary sector; 47 or 9.9% were in wholesale or retail sales or the repair of motor vehicles, 303 or 63.7% were in the movement and storage of goods, 67 or 14.1% were in a hotel or restaurant, 13 or 2.7% were in the information industry, 2 or 0.4% were the insurance or financial industry, 3 or 0.6% were technical professionals or scientists, 21 or 4.4% were in education.

In 2000, there were 384 workers who commuted into the municipality and 640 workers who commuted away. The municipality is a net exporter of workers, with about 1.7 workers leaving the municipality for every one entering. Of the working population, 10.8% used public transportation to get to work, and 68.3% used a private car.

== Religion ==
From the 2000 census, 759 or 53.2% were Roman Catholic, while 344 or 24.1% belonged to the Swiss Reformed Church. Of the rest of the population, there were 11 members of an Orthodox church (or about 0.77% of the population), there were 9 individuals (or about 0.63% of the population) who belonged to the Christian Catholic Church, and there were 17 individuals (or about 1.19% of the population) who belonged to another Christian church. There were 44 (or about 3.08% of the population) who were Islamic. There was 1 person who was Buddhist and 1 individual who belonged to another church. 207 (or about 14.50% of the population) belonged to no church, are agnostic or atheist, and 35 individuals (or about 2.45% of the population) did not answer the question.

== Education ==
In Gunzgen about 618 or (43.3%) of the population have completed non-mandatory upper secondary education, and 140 or (9.8%) have completed additional higher education (either university or a Fachhochschule). Of the 140 who completed tertiary schooling, 72.9% were Swiss men, 20.0% were Swiss women, 5.0% were non-Swiss men.

During the 2010–2011 school year there were a total of 138 students in the Gunzgen school system. The education system in the Canton of Solothurn allows young children to attend two years of non-obligatory Kindergarten. During that school year, there were 25 children in kindergarten. The canton's school system requires students to attend six years of primary school, with some of the children attending smaller, specialized classes. In the municipality there were 104 students in primary school and 9 students in the special, smaller classes. The secondary school program consists of three lower, obligatory years of schooling, followed by three to five years of optional, advanced schools. All the lower secondary students from Gunzgen attend their school in a neighboring municipality.

As of 2000, there were 46 students in Gunzgen who came from another municipality, while 102 residents attended schools outside the municipality.
