= Boningen =

Town in Switzerland

- Municipality
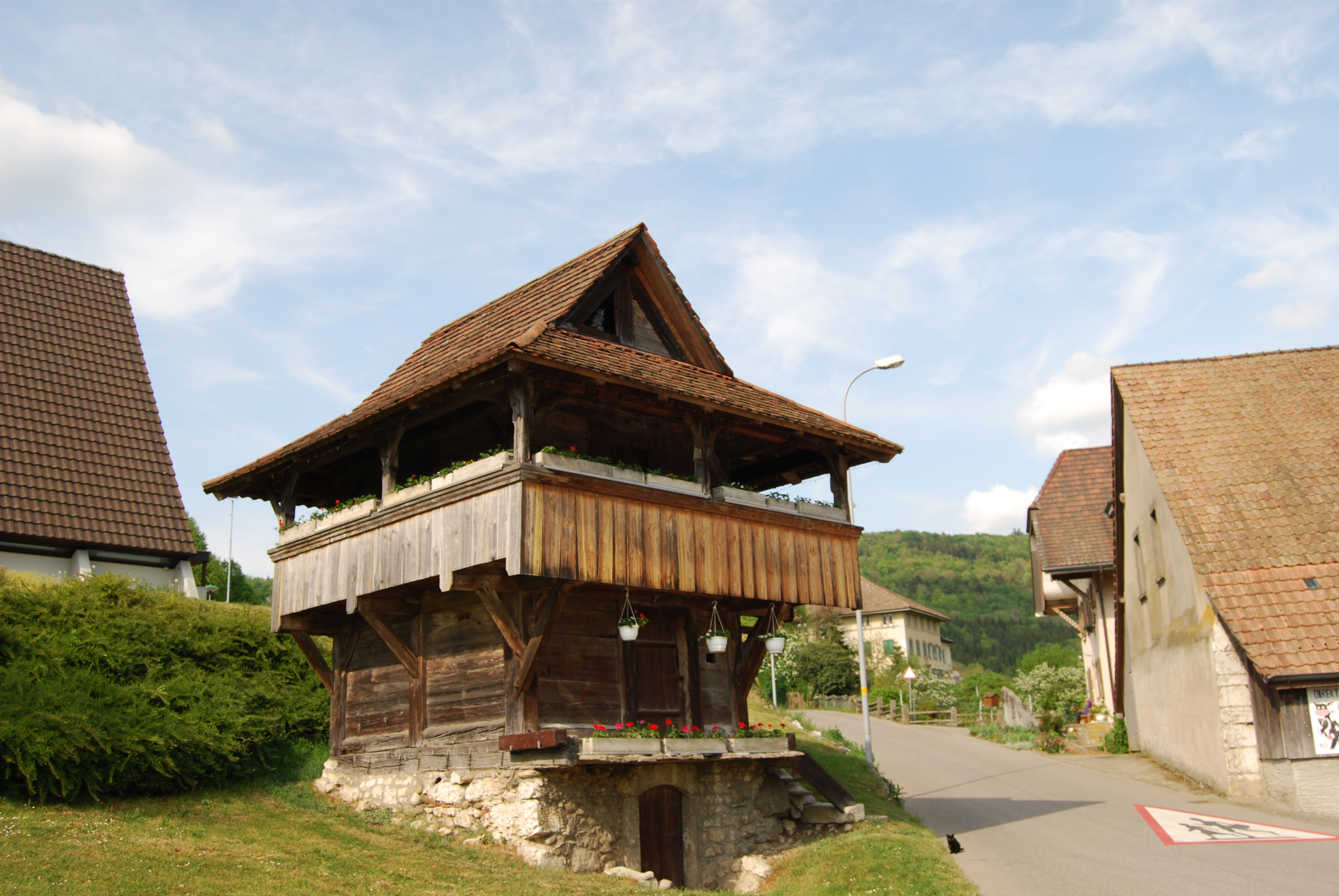

- Coat of arms
- Location of Boningen
- Location within Switzerland Location within Canton of Solothurn
- Coordinates: 47°19′N 7°52′E
- Country: Switzerland
- Canton: Solothurn
- District: Olten

Area
  - Total: 2.78 km^{2} (1.07 sq mi)
- Elevation: 410 m (1,350 ft)

Population (December 2020)
  - Total: 793
  - Density: 285/km^{2} (739/sq mi)
- Time zone: UTC+01:00 (CET)
  - Summer (DST): UTC+02:00 (CEST)
- Postal code: 4618
- SFOS number: 2571
- ISO 3166 code: CH-SO
- Surrounded by: Fulenbach, Gunzgen, Kappel, Murgenthal (AG), Olten, Rothrist (AG)
- Website: boningen.ch

Boningen is a municipality in the district of Olten in the canton of Solothurn in Switzerland.

== History ==
Boningen is first mentioned in 1226 as in villa Bonningen.

== Geography ==
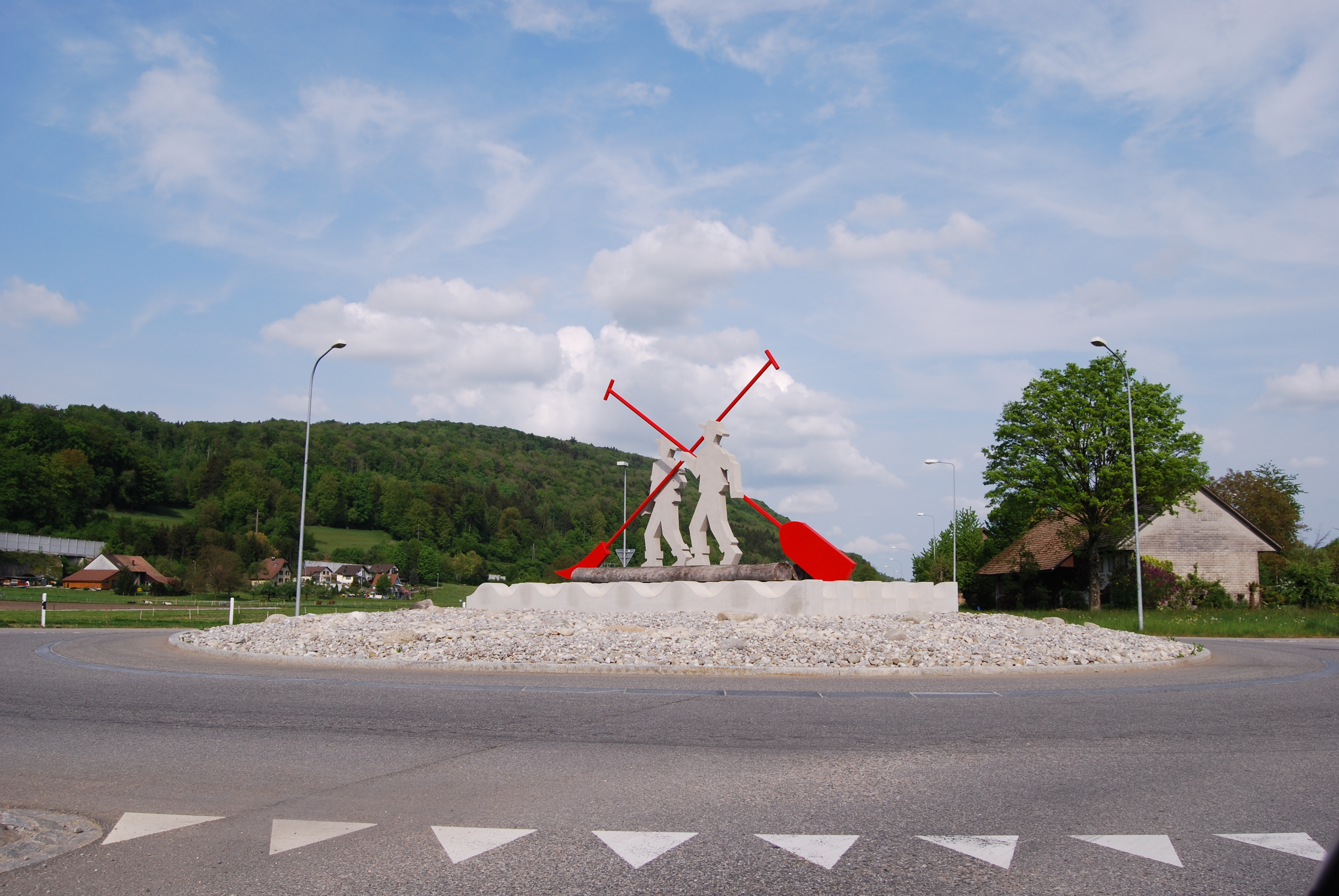
Traffic circle and hills around Boningen

Boningen has an area, as of 2009, of 2.78 square kilometers (1.07 sq mi). Of this area, 1.06 km^{2} (0.41 sq mi) or 38.1% is used for agricultural purposes, while 0.77 km^{2} (0.30 sq mi) or 27.7% is forested. Of the rest of the land, 0.71 km^{2} (0.27 sq mi) or 25.5% is settled (buildings or roads), 0.26 km^{2} (0.10 sq mi) or 9.4% is either rivers or lakes and 0.01 km^{2} (2.5 acres) or 0.4% is unproductive land.

Of the built up area, industrial buildings made up 3.2% of the total area while housing and buildings made up 7.2% and transportation infrastructure made up 5.0%. Power and water infrastructure as well as other special developed areas made up 10.1% of the area Out of the forested land, 23.4% of the total land area is heavily forested and 4.3% is covered with orchards or small clusters of trees. Of the agricultural land, 26.6% is used for growing crops and 10.1% is pastures, while 1.4% is used for orchards or vine crops. Of the water in the municipality, 0.4% is in lakes and 9.0% is in rivers and streams.

The municipality is located in the Olten district, in the Aaregäu between the Aare river and the southern foot of Born mountain. It consists of the village of Boningen and the settlement of Gsteigli.

== Coat of arms ==
The blazon of the municipal coat of arms is Argent a Pike and an Oar Gules in saltire.

== Demographics ==
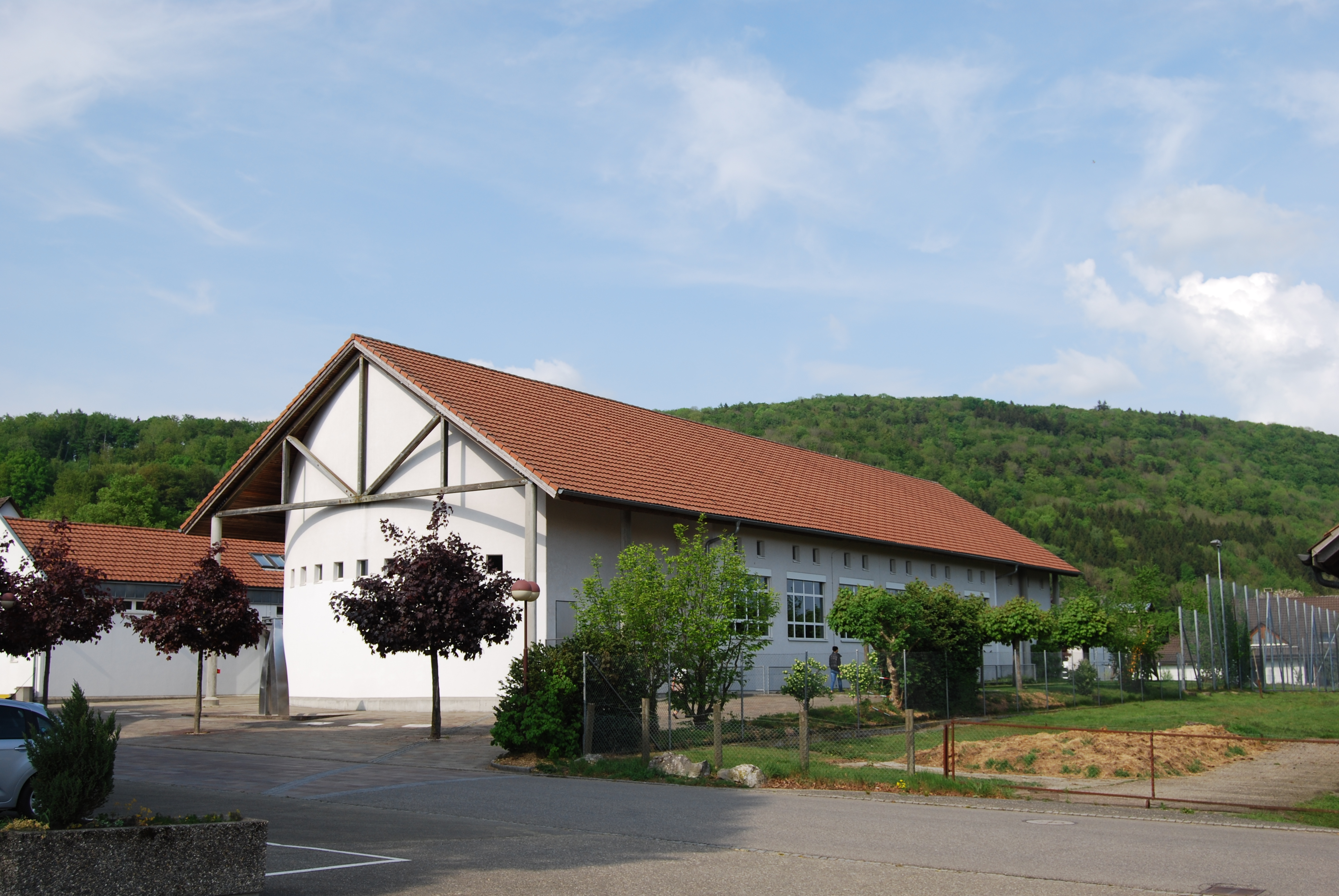
Multi-purpose building in Boningen

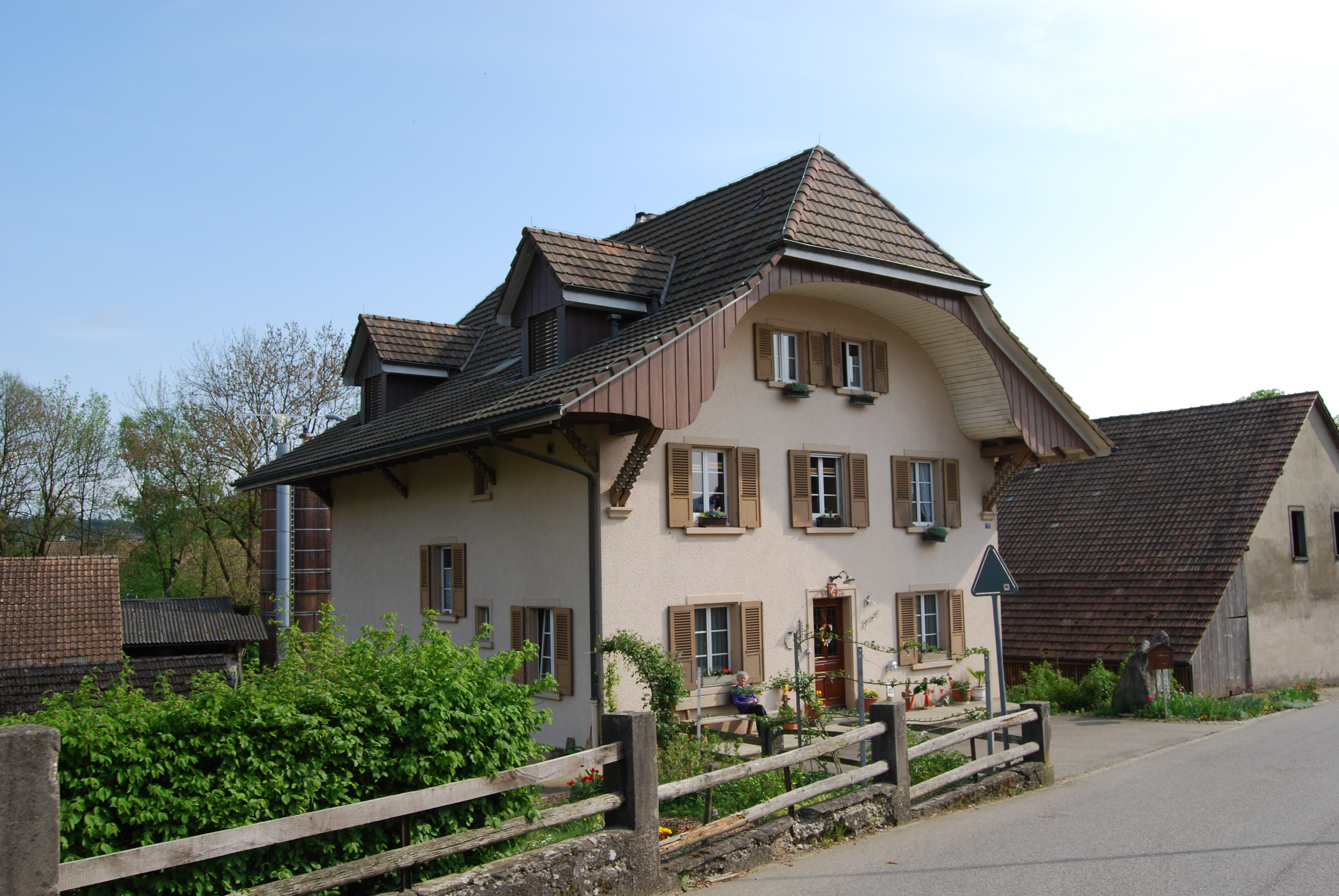
Houses in Boningen

Boningen has a population (as of December 2020) of 793. As of 2008, 12.0% of the population are resident foreign nationals. Over the last 10 years (1999–2009 ) the population has changed at a rate of 10.3%.

Most of the population (as of 2000) speaks German (609 or 95.8%), with Serbo-Croatian being second most common (10 or 1.6%) and Italian being third (4 or 0.6%). There is 1 person who speaks French.

As of 2008, the gender distribution of the population was 49.2% male and 50.8% female. The population was made up of 312 Swiss men (43.4% of the population) and 42 (5.8%) non-Swiss men. There were 316 Swiss women (43.9%) and 49 (6.8%) non-Swiss women. Of the population in the municipality 201 or about 31.6% were born in Boningen and lived there in 2000. There were 205 or 32.2% who were born in the same canton, while 159 or 25.0% were born somewhere else in Switzerland, and 56 or 8.8% were born outside of Switzerland.

In 2008 there were 5 live births to Swiss citizens and 1 birth to non-Swiss citizens. Ignoring immigration and emigration, the population of Swiss citizens increased by 5 while the foreign population increased by 1. There was 1 Swiss woman who emigrated from Switzerland. At the same time, there was 1 non-Swiss man and 3 non-Swiss women who immigrated from another country to Switzerland. The total Swiss population change in 2008 (from all sources, including moves across municipal borders) was an increase of 23 and the non-Swiss population increased by 20 people. This represents a population growth rate of 6.5%.

The age distribution, as of 2000, in Boningen is; 55 children or 8.6% of the population are between 0 and 6 years old and 125 teenagers or 19.7% are between 7 and 19. Of the adult population, 41 people or 6.4% of the population are between 20 and 24 years old. 231 people or 36.3% are between 25 and 44, and 121 people or 19.0% are between 45 and 64. The senior population distribution is 51 people or 8.0% of the population are between 65 and 79 years old and there are 12 people or 1.9% who are over 80.

As of 2000, there were 297 people who were single and never married in the municipality. There were 289 married individuals, 23 widows or widowers and 27 individuals who are divorced.

As of 2000, there were 254 private households in the municipality, and an average of 2.5 persons per household. There were 69 households that consist of only one person and 27 households with five or more people. Out of a total of 257 households that answered this question, 26.8% were households made up of just one person and there were 1 adults who lived with their parents. Of the rest of the households, there are 74 married couples without children, 90 married couples with children There were 17 single parents with a child or children. There were 3 households that were made up of unrelated people and 3 households that were made up of some sort of institution or another collective housing.

In 2000 there were 116 single-family homes (or 71.2% of the total) out of a total of 163 inhabited buildings. There were 27 multi-family buildings (16.6%), along with 15 multi-purpose buildings that were mostly used for housing (9.2%) and 5 other use buildings (commercial or industrial) that also had some housing (3.1%). Of the single-family homes 8 were built before 1919, while 21 were built between 1990 and 2000. The greatest number of single-family homes (46) were built between 1981 and 1990.

In 2000 there were 257 apartments in the municipality. The most common apartment size was 4 rooms of which there were 79. There were 4 single-room apartments and 97 apartments with five or more rooms. Of these apartments, a total of 244 apartments (94.9% of the total) were permanently occupied, while 5 apartments (1.9%) were seasonally occupied and 8 apartments (3.1%) were empty. As of 2009, the construction rate of new housing units was 8.4 new units per 1000 residents. The vacancy rate for the municipality, in 2010, was 0.67%.

The historical population is given in the following chart:

== Politics ==
In the 2007 federal election the most popular party was the SVP which received 33.91% of the vote. The next three most popular parties were the CVP (20.16%), the FDP (19.29%) and the SP (17.61%). In the federal election, a total of 238 votes were cast, and the voter turnout was 49.8%.

== Economy ==
As of 2010, Boningen had an unemployment rate of 2.5%. As of 2008, there were 21 people employed in the primary economic sector and about 7 businesses involved in this sector. 79 people were employed in the secondary sector and there were 8 businesses in this sector. 70 people were employed in the tertiary sector, with 9 businesses in this sector. There were 346 residents of the municipality who were employed in some capacity, of which females made up 40.8% of the workforce.

In 2008 the total number of full-time equivalent jobs was 146. The number of jobs in the primary sector was 13, all of which were in agriculture. The number of jobs in the secondary sector was 72 of which 36 or (50.0%) were in manufacturing, 26 or (36.1%) were in mining and 4 (5.6%) were in construction. The number of jobs in the tertiary sector was 61. In the tertiary sector; 32 or 52.5% were in wholesale or retail sales or the repair of motor vehicles, 23 or 37.7% were in the movement and storage of goods, 2 or 3.3% were technical professionals or scientists, 1 was in education.

In 2000, there were 86 workers who commuted into the municipality and 278 workers who commuted away. The municipality is a net exporter of workers, with about 3.2 workers leaving the municipality for every one entering. Of the working population, 12.4% used public transportation to get to work, and 68.2% used a private car.

== Religion ==
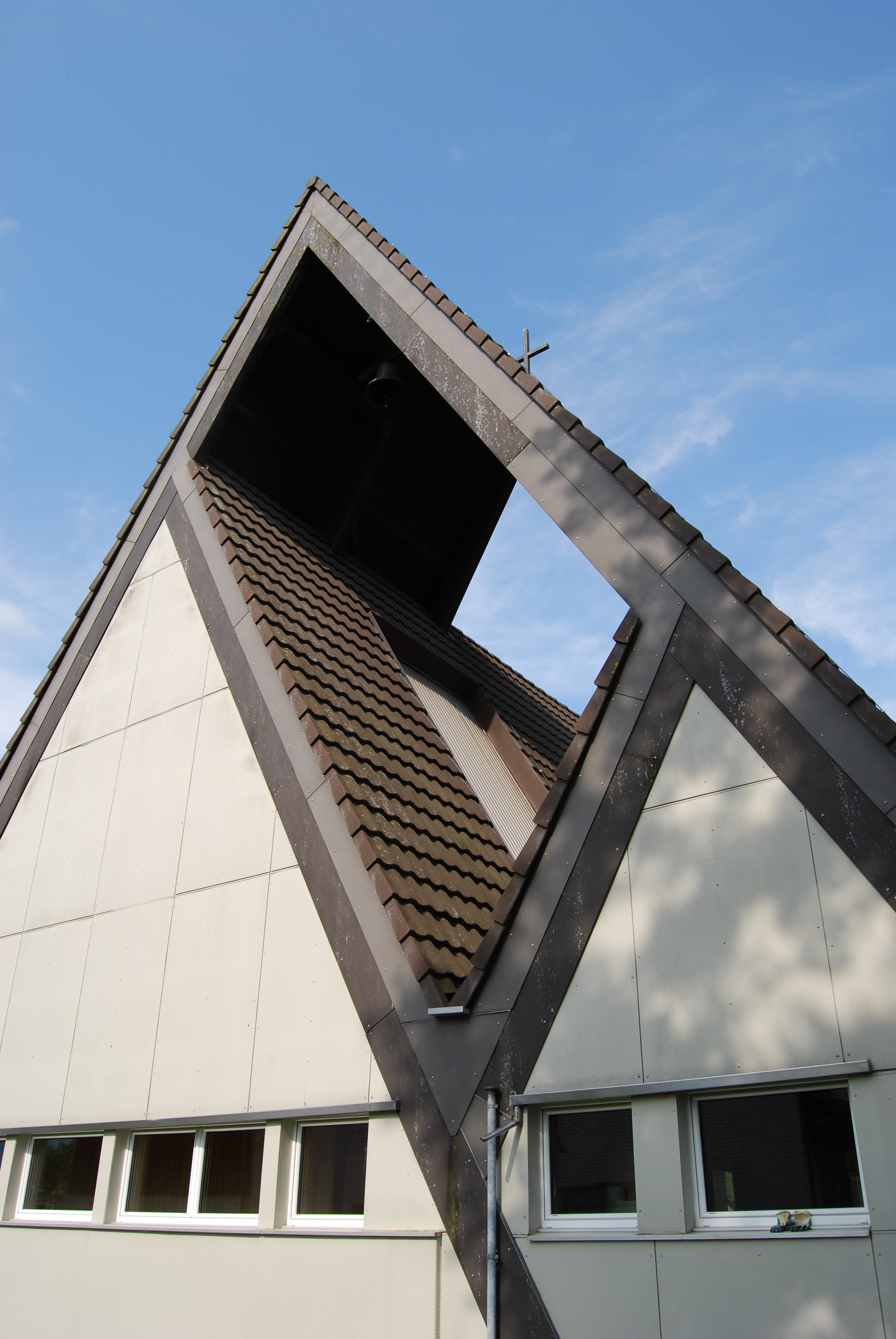
Boningen village church

From the 2000 census, 346 or 54.4% were Roman Catholic, while 200 or 31.4% belonged to the Swiss Reformed Church. Of the rest of the population, there were 10 members of an Orthodox church (or about 1.57% of the population), there were 9 individuals (or about 1.42% of the population) who belonged to the Christian Catholic Church, and there were 7 individuals (or about 1.10% of the population) who belonged to another Christian church. There were 3 (or about 0.47% of the population) who were Islamic. There were 4 individuals who were Buddhist. 49 (or about 7.70% of the population) belonged to no church, are agnostic or atheist, and 8 individuals (or about 1.26% of the population) did not answer the question.

== Education ==
In Boningen about 240 or (37.7%) of the population have completed non-mandatory upper secondary education, and 57 or (9.0%) have completed additional higher education (either university or a Fachhochschule). Of the 57 who completed tertiary schooling, 73.7% were Swiss men, 21.1% were Swiss women.

During the 2010–2011 school year there were a total of 63 students in the Boningen school system. The education system in the Canton of Solothurn allows young children to attend two years of non-obligatory Kindergarten. During that school year, there were 15 children in kindergarten. The canton's school system requires students to attend six years of primary school, with some of the children attending smaller, specialized classes. In the municipality there were 48 students in primary school. The secondary school program consists of three lower, obligatory years of schooling, followed by three to five years of optional, advanced schools. All the lower secondary students from Boningen attend their school in a neighboring municipality.

As of 2000, there was one student in Boningen who came from another municipality, while 61 residents attended schools outside the municipality.
