= Egerkingen =

- Municipality
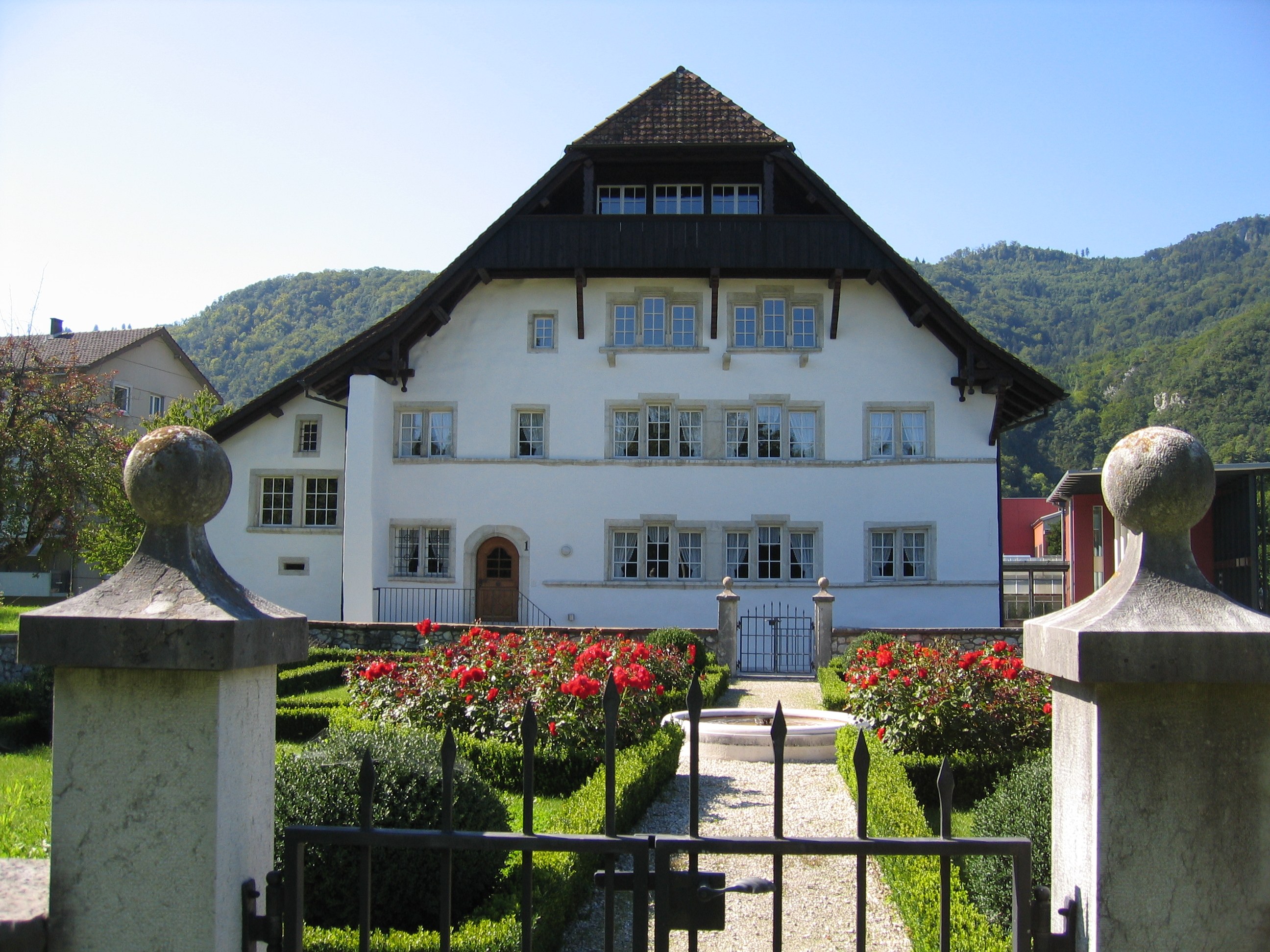
- Old Mill in Egerkingen

- Coat of arms
- Location of Egerkingen
- Location within Switzerland Location within Canton of Solothurn
- Coordinates: 47°19′N 7°48′E
- Country: Switzerland
- Canton: Solothurn
- District: Gäu

Area
  - Total: 6.94 km^{2} (2.68 sq mi)
- Elevation: 440 m (1,440 ft)

Population (December 2020)
  - Total: 4,041
  - Density: 582/km^{2} (1,510/sq mi)
- Time zone: UTC+01:00 (CET)
  - Summer (DST): UTC+02:00 (CEST)
- Postal code: 4622
- SFOS number: 2401
- ISO 3166 code: CH-SO
- Surrounded by: Gunzgen, Hägendorf, Härkingen, Holderbank, Langenbruck (BL), Neuendorf, Oberbuchsiten
- Website: www.egerkingen.ch

Egerkingen is a municipality in the district of Gäu in the canton of Solothurn in Switzerland.

== History ==
Egerkingen is first mentioned in 1201 as in Egrichen. In 1212 it was mentioned as in Egerchingen.

== Geography ==
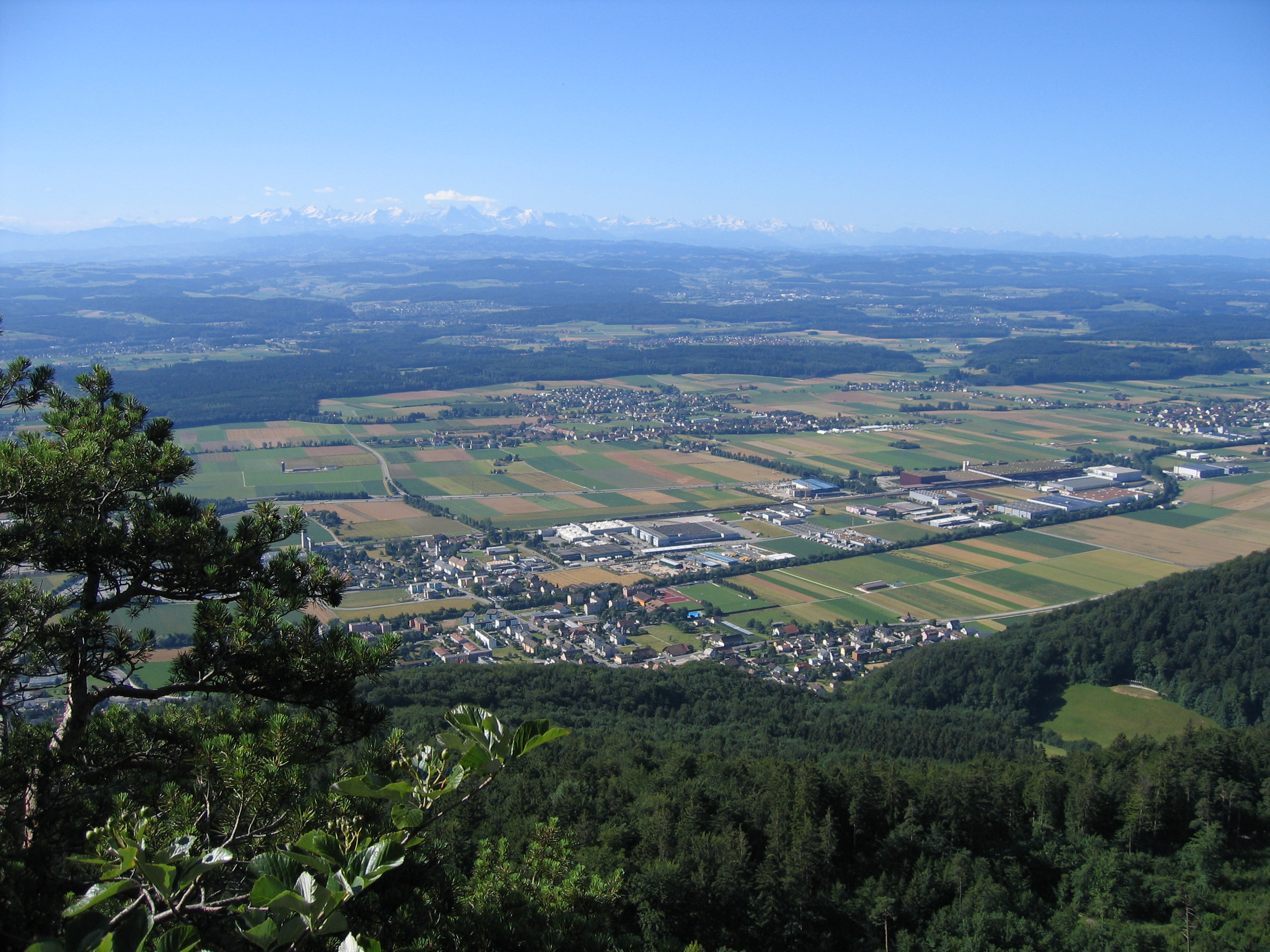
View from the Höchi Flue in Egenkingen

Aerial view (1958)

Egerkingen has an area, as of 2009, of 6.94 square kilometers (2.68 sq mi). Of this area, 1.72 km^{2} (0.66 sq mi) or 24.8% is used for agricultural purposes, while 3.44 km^{2} (1.33 sq mi) or 49.6% is forested. Of the rest of the land, 1.74 km^{2} (0.67 sq mi) or 25.1% is settled (buildings or roads), 0.02 km^{2} (4.9 acres) or 0.3% is either rivers or lakes.

Of the built up area, industrial buildings made up 5.5% of the total area while housing and buildings made up 9.2% and transportation infrastructure made up 8.6%. Power and water infrastructure as well as other special developed areas made up 1.2% of the area. Out of the forested land, 48.1% of the total land area is heavily forested and 1.4% is covered with orchards or small clusters of trees. Of the agricultural land, 17.6% is used for growing crops and 5.3% is pastures, while 1.2% is used for orchards or vine crops. All the water in the municipality is flowing water.

The municipality is located in the Gäu district, at the southern foot of the Jura Mountains between Olten and Oensingen.

== Coat of arms ==
The blazon of the municipal coat of arms is Azure two Fir Trees issuant from as many Mounts all Vert between three Fleurs-de-lis or the middle one inverted.

== Demographics ==
Egerkingen has a population (as of December 2020) of 4,041. As of 2008, 26.5% of the population are resident foreign nationals. Over the last 10 years (1999–2009 ) the population has changed at a rate of 14.1%.

Most of the population (as of 2000) speaks German (2,522 or 87.4%), with Serbo-Croatian being second most common (81 or 2.8%) and Turkish being third (56 or 1.9%). There are 14 people who speak French and 2 people who speak Romansh.

As of 2008, the gender distribution of the population was 50.5% male and 49.5% female. The population was made up of 1,114 Swiss men (35.2% of the population) and 486 (15.4%) non-Swiss men. There were 1,127 Swiss women (35.6%) and 439 (13.9%) non-Swiss women. Of the population in the municipality 892 or about 30.9% were born in Egerkingen and lived there in 2000. There were 680 or 23.6% who were born in the same canton, while 662 or 23.0% were born somewhere else in Switzerland, and 535 or 18.6% were born outside of Switzerland.

In 2008 there were 29 live births to Swiss citizens and 16 births to non-Swiss citizens, and in same time span there were 15 deaths of Swiss citizens and 2 non-Swiss citizen deaths. Ignoring immigration and emigration, the population of Swiss citizens increased by 14 while the foreign population increased by 14. There were 4 Swiss men who emigrated from Switzerland and 6 Swiss women who immigrated back to Switzerland. At the same time, there were 12 non-Swiss men and 17 non-Swiss women who immigrated from another country to Switzerland. The total Swiss population change in 2008 (from all sources, including moves across municipal borders) was an increase of 71 and the non-Swiss population increased by 60 people. This represents a population growth rate of 4.6%.

The age distribution, as of 2000, in Egerkingen is; 221 children or 7.7% of the population are between 0 and 6 years old and 463 teenagers or 16.1% are between 7 and 19. Of the adult population, 168 people or 5.8% of the population are between 20 and 24 years old. 982 people or 34.0% are between 25 and 44, and 665 people or 23.1% are between 45 and 64. The senior population distribution is 280 people or 9.7% of the population are between 65 and 79 years old and there are 105 people or 3.6% who are over 80.

As of 2000, there were 1,187 people who were single and never married in the municipality. There were 1,359 married individuals, 178 widows or widowers and 160 individuals who are divorced.

As of 2000, there were 1,138 private households in the municipality, and an average of 2.4 persons per household. There were 338 households that consist of only one person and 84 households with five or more people. Out of a total of 1,152 households that answered this question, 29.3% were households made up of just one person and there were 6 adults who lived with their parents. Of the rest of the households, there are 352 married couples without children, 374 married couples with children There were 55 single parents with a child or children. There were 13 households that were made up of unrelated people and 14 households that were made up of some sort of institution or another collective housing.

In 2000 there were 378 single family homes (or 64.0% of the total) out of a total of 591 inhabited buildings. There were 123 multi-family buildings (20.8%), along with 55 multi-purpose buildings that were mostly used for housing (9.3%) and 35 other use buildings (commercial or industrial) that also had some housing (5.9%). Of the single family homes 45 were built before 1919, while 77 were built between 1990 and 2000. The greatest number of single family homes (62) were built between 1971 and 1980.

In 2000 there were 1,202 apartments in the municipality. The most common apartment size was 4 rooms of which there were 398. There were 45 single room apartments and 399 apartments with five or more rooms. Of these apartments, a total of 1,123 apartments (93.4% of the total) were permanently occupied, while 54 apartments (4.5%) were seasonally occupied and 25 apartments (2.1%) were empty. As of 2009, the construction rate of new housing units was 5.3 new units per 1000 residents. The vacancy rate for the municipality, in 2010, was 1.35%.

The historical population is given in the following chart:

== Politics ==
In the 2007 federal election the most popular party was the SVP which received 34.29% of the vote. The next three most popular parties were the CVP (27.47%), the FDP (24.92%) and the SP (8.23%). In the federal election, a total of 884 votes were cast, and the voter turnout was 48.4%.

== Economy ==
As of 2010, Egerkingen had an unemployment rate of 4.2%. As of 2008, there were 30 people employed in the primary economic sector and about 10 businesses involved in this sector. 675 people were employed in the secondary sector and there were 29 businesses in this sector. 1,815 people were employed in the tertiary sector, with 177 businesses in this sector. There were 1,599 residents of the municipality who were employed in some capacity, of which females made up 42.5% of the workforce.

In 2008 the total number of full-time equivalent jobs was 2,095. The number of jobs in the primary sector was 17, all of which were in agriculture. The number of jobs in the secondary sector was 625 of which 550 or (88.0%) were in manufacturing, 4 or (0.6%) were in mining and 71 (11.4%) were in construction. The number of jobs in the tertiary sector was 1,453. In the tertiary sector; 672 or 46.2% were in wholesale or retail sales or the repair of motor vehicles, 115 or 7.9% were in the movement and storage of goods, 258 or 17.8% were in a hotel or restaurant, 11 or 0.8% were in the information industry, 38 or 2.6% were the insurance or financial industry, 96 or 6.6% were technical professionals or scientists, 42 or 2.9% were in education and 110 or 7.6% were in health care.

In 2000, there were 1,826 workers who commuted into the municipality and 1,028 workers who commuted away. The municipality is a net importer of workers, with about 1.8 workers entering the municipality for every one leaving. Of the working population, 9.9% used public transportation to get to work, and 60.2% used a private car.

== Religion ==
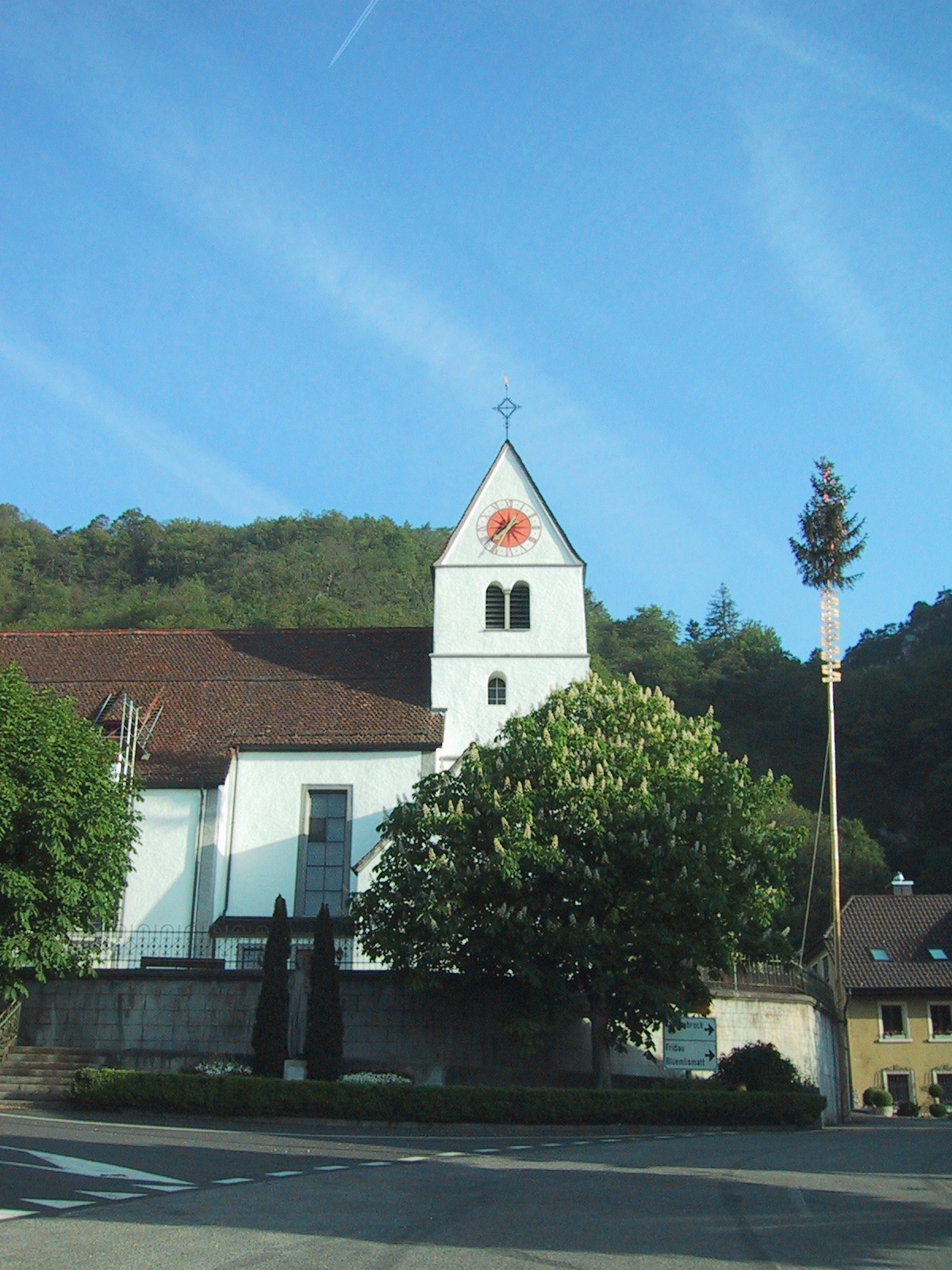
Egerkingen church

From the 2000 census, 1,540 or 53.4% were Roman Catholic, while 620 or 21.5% belonged to the Swiss Reformed Church. Of the rest of the population, there were 64 members of an Orthodox church (or about 2.22% of the population), there were 4 individuals (or about 0.14% of the population) who belonged to the Christian Catholic Church, and there were 25 individuals (or about 0.87% of the population) who belonged to another Christian church. There were 221 (or about 7.66% of the population) who were Islamic. There were 24 individuals who were Buddhist, 13 individuals who were Hindu and 1 individual who belonged to another church. 321 (or about 11.13% of the population) belonged to no church, are agnostic or atheist, and 51 individuals (or about 1.77% of the population) did not answer the question.

== Education ==
In Egerkingen about 1,105 or (38.3%) of the population have completed non-mandatory upper secondary education, and 254 or (8.8%) have completed additional higher education (either university or a Fachhochschule). Of the 254 who completed tertiary schooling, 72.0% were Swiss men, 16.5% were Swiss women, 9.1% were non-Swiss men and 2.4% were non-Swiss women.

During the 2010-2011 school year there were a total of 277 students in the Egerkingen school system. The education system in the Canton of Solothurn allows young children to attend two years of non-obligatory Kindergarten. During that school year, there were 73 children in kindergarten. The canton's school system requires students to attend six years of primary school, with some of the children attending smaller, specialized classes. In the municipality there were 204 students in primary school. The secondary school program consists of three lower, obligatory years of schooling, followed by three to five years of optional, advanced schools. All the lower secondary students from Egerkingen attend their school in a neighboring municipality.

As of 2000, there were 67 students in Egerkingen who came from another municipality, while 116 residents attended schools outside the municipality.

== Notable people ==
- Reto Von Arx, ice hockey player for the HC Davos
