= Kappel, Switzerland =

Kappel
- Municipality
- Flag Coat of arms
- Location of Kappel
- Location within Switzerland Location within Canton of Solothurn
- Coordinates: 47°20′N 7°51′E
- Country: Switzerland
- Canton: Solothurn
- District: Olten

Area
  - Total: 5.09 km^{2} (1.97 sq mi)
- Elevation: 425 m (1,394 ft)

Population (December 2020)
  - Total: 3,278
  - Density: 644/km^{2} (1,670/sq mi)
- Time zone: UTC+01:00 (CET)
  - Summer (DST): UTC+02:00 (CEST)
- Postal code: 4616
- SFOS number: 2580
- ISO 3166 code: CH-SO
- Surrounded by: Boningen, Gunzgen, Hägendorf, Olten, Rickenbach, Wangen bei Olten
- Website: kappel.ch

Kappel is a municipality in the district of Olten in the canton of Solothurn in Switzerland.

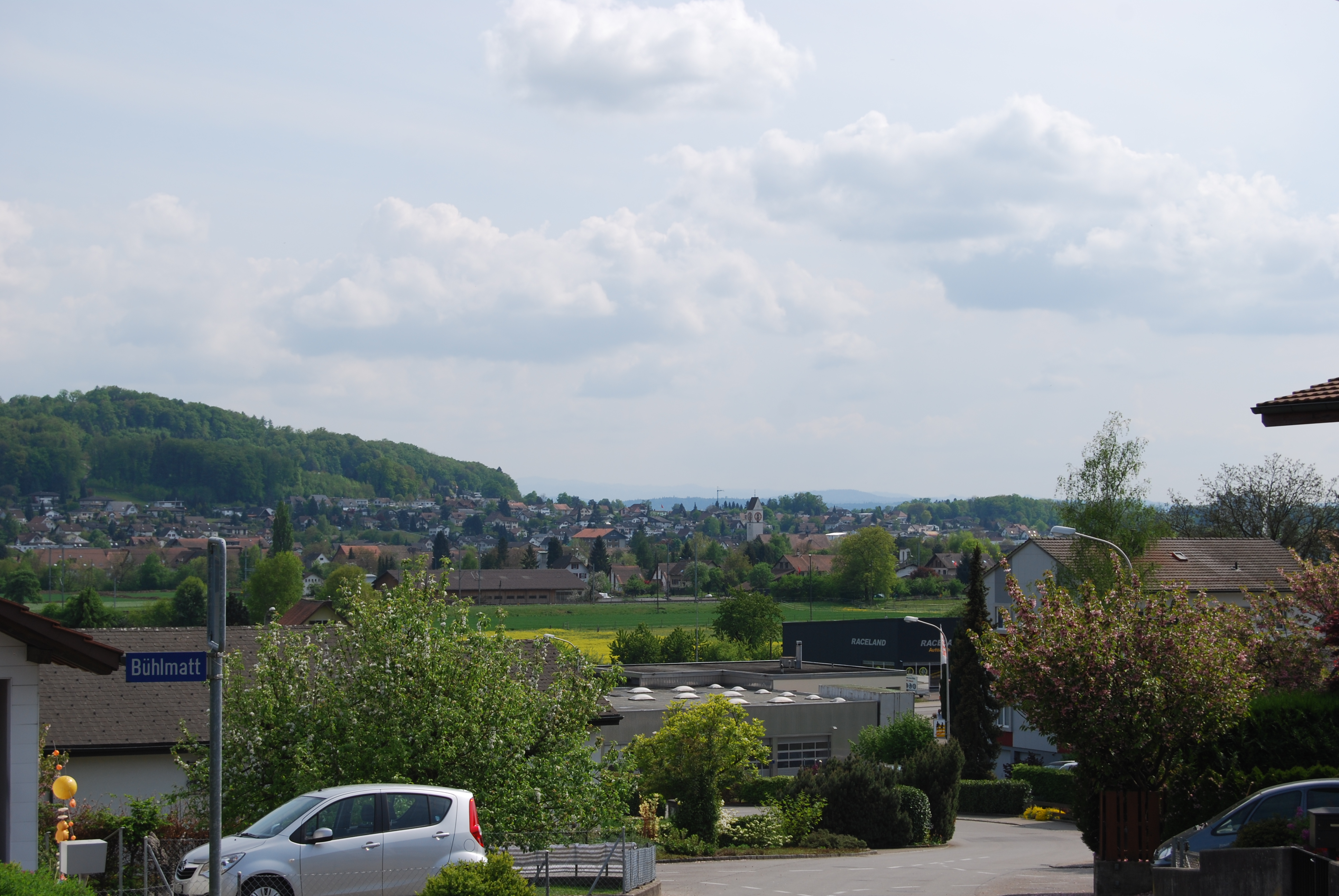
Kappel

== History ==
Kappel is first mentioned in 1260 as Capella. In 1312, it was mentioned as Nydern Capellen to distinguish it from the village of Oberkappelen, now Kestenholz.

== Geography ==
Aerial view (1970)

Kappel has an area, as of 2009, of 5.09 square kilometers (1.97 sq mi). Of this area, 1.67 km^{2} (0.64 sq mi) or 32.8% is used for agricultural purposes, while 2.48 km^{2} (0.96 sq mi) or 48.7% is forested. Of the rest of the land, 0.94 km^{2} (0.36 sq mi) or 18.5% is settled (buildings or roads), 0.01 km^{2} (2.5 acres) or 0.2% is either rivers or lakes.

Of the built up area, housing and buildings made up 12.4% and transportation infrastructure made up 3.9%. Out of the forested land, 46.6% of the total land area is heavily forested and 2.2% is covered with orchards or small clusters of trees. Of the agricultural land, 20.0% is used for growing crops and 9.8% is pastures, while 2.9% is used for orchards or vine crops. All the water in the municipality is flowing water.

The municipality is located in the Olten district, in the Dünnern valley, north-west of Mt. Born. It consists of the village of Kappel.

== Coat of arms ==
The blazon of the municipal coat of arms is Or a Chapel Sable issuant from a Base wavy Sable and Argent.

== Demographics ==
Kappel has a population (as of December 2020) of 3,278. As of 2008, 12.8% of the population are resident foreign nationals. Over the last 10 years (1999–2009) the population has changed at a rate of 14%.

Most of the population (as of 2000) speaks German (2,324 or 93.5%), with French being second most common (29 or 1.2%) and Albanian being third (29 or 1.2%). There is 1 person who speaks Romansh.

As of 2008, the gender distribution of the population was 50.0% male and 50.0% female. The population was made up of 1,195 Swiss men (42.0% of the population) and 229 (8.0%) non-Swiss men. There were 1,233 Swiss women (43.3%) and 189 (6.6%) non-Swiss women. Of the population in the municipality 611 or about 24.6% were born in Kappel and lived there in 2000. There were 854 or 34.4% who were born in the same canton, while 657 or 26.4% were born somewhere else in Switzerland, and 308 or 12.4% were born outside of Switzerland.

In 2008 there were 11 live births to Swiss citizens and 7 births to non-Swiss citizens, and in same time span there were 17 deaths of Swiss citizens. Ignoring immigration and emigration, the population of Swiss citizens decreased by 6 while the foreign population increased by 7. There were 4 Swiss men who immigrated back to Switzerland. At the same time, there were 8 non-Swiss men and 5 non-Swiss women who immigrated from another country to Switzerland. The total Swiss population change in 2008 (from all sources, including moves across municipal borders) was a decrease of 11 and the non-Swiss population increased by 36 people. This represents a population growth rate of 0.9%.

The age distribution, as of 2000, in Kappel is; 167 children or 6.7% of the population are between 0 and 6 years old and 448 teenagers or 18.0% are between 7 and 19. Of the adult population, 124 people or 5.0% of the population are between 20 and 24 years old. 805 people or 32.4% are between 25 and 44, and 634 people or 25.5% are between 45 and 64. The senior population distribution is 249 people or 10.0% of the population are between 65 and 79 years old and there are 59 people or 2.4% who are over 80.

As of 2000, there were 989 people who were single and never married in the municipality. There were 1,254 married individuals, 119 widows or widowers and 124 individuals who are divorced.

As of 2000, there were 991 private households in the municipality, and an average of 2.5 persons per household. There were 245 households that consist of only one person and 81 households with five or more people. Out of a total of 1,000 households that answered this question, 24.5% were households made up of just one person and there were 11 adults who lived with their parents. Of the rest of the households, there are 325 married couples without children, 356 married couples with children There were 45 single parents with a child or children. There were 9 households that were made up of unrelated people and 9 households that were made up of some sort of institution or another collective housing.

In 2000 there were 497 single family homes (or 78.9% of the total) out of a total of 630 inhabited buildings. There were 77 multi-family buildings (12.2%), along with 40 multi-purpose buildings that were mostly used for housing (6.3%) and 16 other use buildings (commercial or industrial) that also had some housing (2.5%). Of the single family homes 17 were built before 1919, while 126 were built between 1990 and 2000. The greatest number of single family homes (113) were built between 1981 and 1990.

In 2000 there were 1,126 apartments in the municipality. The most common apartment size was 4 rooms of which there were 355. There were 23 single room apartments and 458 apartments with five or more rooms. Of these apartments, a total of 979 apartments (86.9% of the total) were permanently occupied, while 51 apartments (4.5%) were seasonally occupied and 96 apartments (8.5%) were empty. As of 2009, the construction rate of new housing units was 34.4 new units per 1000 residents. The vacancy rate for the municipality, in 2010, was 1.5%.

The historical population is given in the following chart:

== Politics ==
In the 2007 federal election the most popular party was the SVP which received 31.99% of the vote. The next three most popular parties were the CVP (26.86%), the SP (17.39%) and the FDP (15.57%). In the federal election, a total of 1,062 votes were cast, and the voter turnout was 54.6%.

== Economy ==
As of 2010, Kappel had an unemployment rate of 3.1%. As of 2008, there were 22 people employed in the primary economic sector and about 8 businesses involved in this sector. 133 people were employed in the secondary sector and there were 19 businesses in this sector. 271 people were employed in the tertiary sector, with 57 businesses in this sector. There were 1,395 residents of the municipality who were employed in some capacity, of which females made up 43.4% of the workforce.

In 2008 the total number of full-time equivalent jobs was 350. The number of jobs in the primary sector was 13, all of which were in agriculture. The number of jobs in the secondary sector was 118 of which 29 or (24.6%) were in manufacturing and 83 (70.3%) were in construction. The number of jobs in the tertiary sector was 219. In the tertiary sector; 69 or 31.5% were in wholesale or retail sales or the repair of motor vehicles, 35 or 16.0% were in the movement and storage of goods, 21 or 9.6% were in a hotel or restaurant, 1 was in the information industry, 5 or 2.3% were the insurance or financial industry, 14 or 6.4% were technical professionals or scientists, 18 or 8.2% were in education and 21 or 9.6% were in health care.

In 2000, there were 172 workers who commuted into the municipality and 1,163 workers who commuted away. The municipality is a net exporter of workers, with about 6.8 workers leaving the municipality for every one entering. Of the working population, 14.5% used public transportation to get to work, and 63.8% used a private car.

== Religion ==
From the 2000 census, 1,371 or 55.1% were Roman Catholic, while 562 or 22.6% belonged to the Swiss Reformed Church. Of the rest of the population, there were 27 members of an Orthodox church (or about 1.09% of the population), there were 19 individuals (or about 0.76% of the population) who belonged to the Christian Catholic Church, and there were 46 individuals (or about 1.85% of the population) who belonged to another Christian church. There were 93 (or about 3.74% of the population) who were Islamic. There were 4 individuals who were Buddhist, 3 individuals who were Hindu and 2 individuals who belonged to another church. 294 (or about 11.83% of the population) belonged to no church, are agnostic or atheist, and 65 individuals (or about 2.61% of the population) did not answer the question.

== Education ==
In Kappel about 1,016 or (40.9%) of the population have completed non-mandatory upper secondary education, and 287 or (11.5%) have completed additional higher education (either university or a Fachhochschule). Of the 287 who completed tertiary schooling, 79.4% were Swiss men, 13.9% were Swiss women, 3.5% were non-Swiss men and 3.1% were non-Swiss women.

During the 2010–2011 school year there were a total of 244 students in the Kappel school system. The education system in the Canton of Solothurn allows young children to attend two years of non-obligatory Kindergarten. During that school year, there were 59 children in kindergarten. The canton's school system requires students to attend six years of primary school, with some of the children attending smaller, specialized classes. In the municipality there were 185 students in primary school. The secondary school program consists of three lower, obligatory years of schooling, followed by three to five years of optional, advanced schools. All the lower secondary students from Kappel attend their school in a neighboring municipality. As of 2000, there were 15 students in Kappel who came from another municipality, while 204 residents attended schools outside the municipality.
