= Starrkirch-Wil =

- Municipality
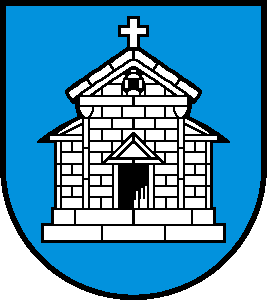
- Coat of arms
- Location of Starrkirch-Wil
- Location within Switzerland Location within Canton of Solothurn
- Coordinates: 47°21′N 7°55′E
- Country: Switzerland
- Canton: Solothurn
- District: Olten

Area
  - Total: 1.84 km^{2} (0.71 sq mi)
- Elevation: 419 m (1,375 ft)

Population (December 2020)
  - Total: 1,753
  - Density: 953/km^{2} (2,470/sq mi)
- Time zone: UTC+01:00 (CET)
  - Summer (DST): UTC+02:00 (CEST)
- Postal code: 4656
- SFOS number: 2584
- ISO 3166 code: CH-SO
- Surrounded by: Aarburg (AG), Dulliken, Oftringen (AG), Olten (SO)
- Website: starrkirch-wil.ch

Starrkirch-Wil is a municipality in the district of Olten in the canton of Solothurn in Switzerland.

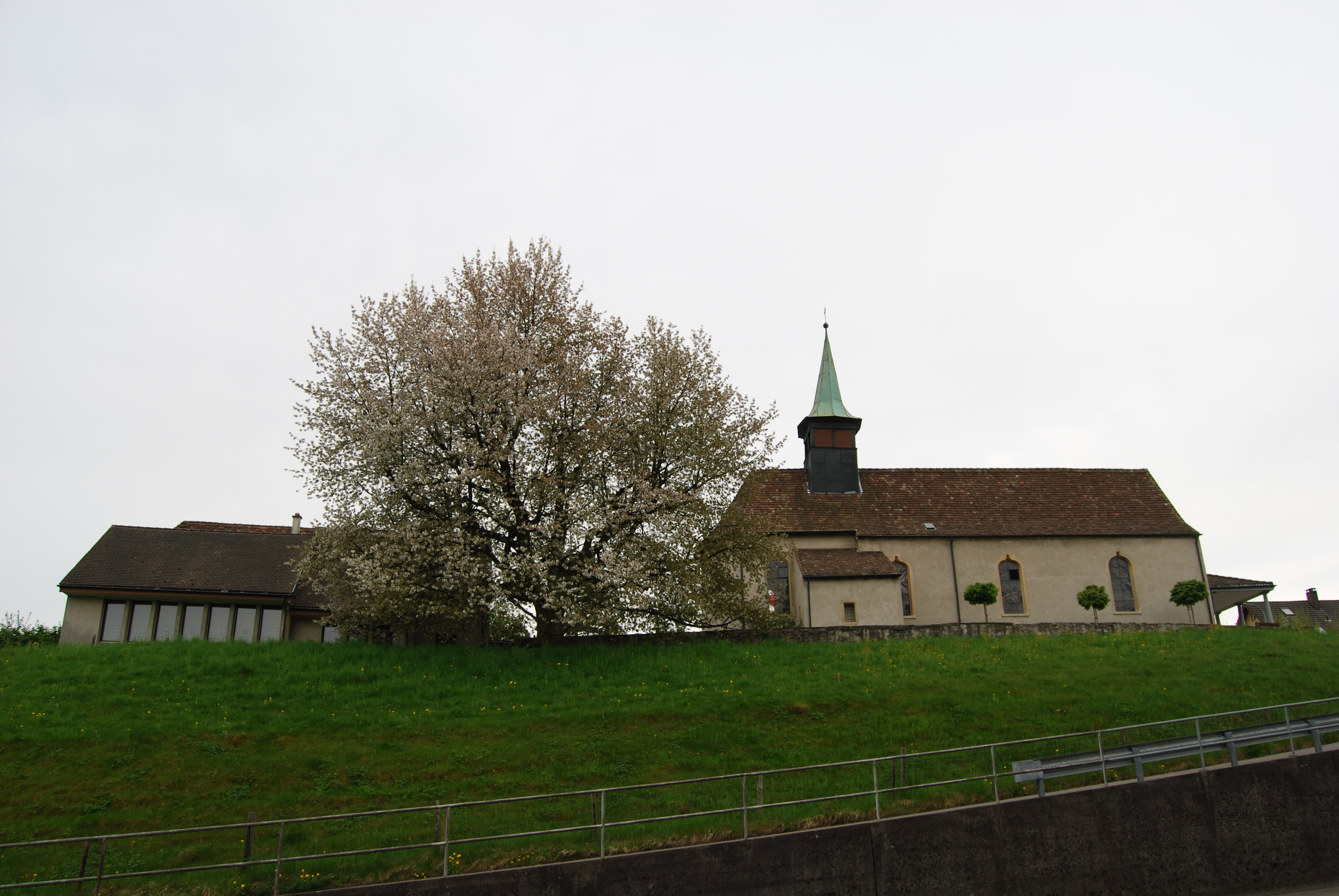
Starrkirch-Wil

== History ==
Starrkirch is first mentioned in 1036 as Starchenchilcha. In 1288 Wil was mentioned as Wile.

== Geography ==
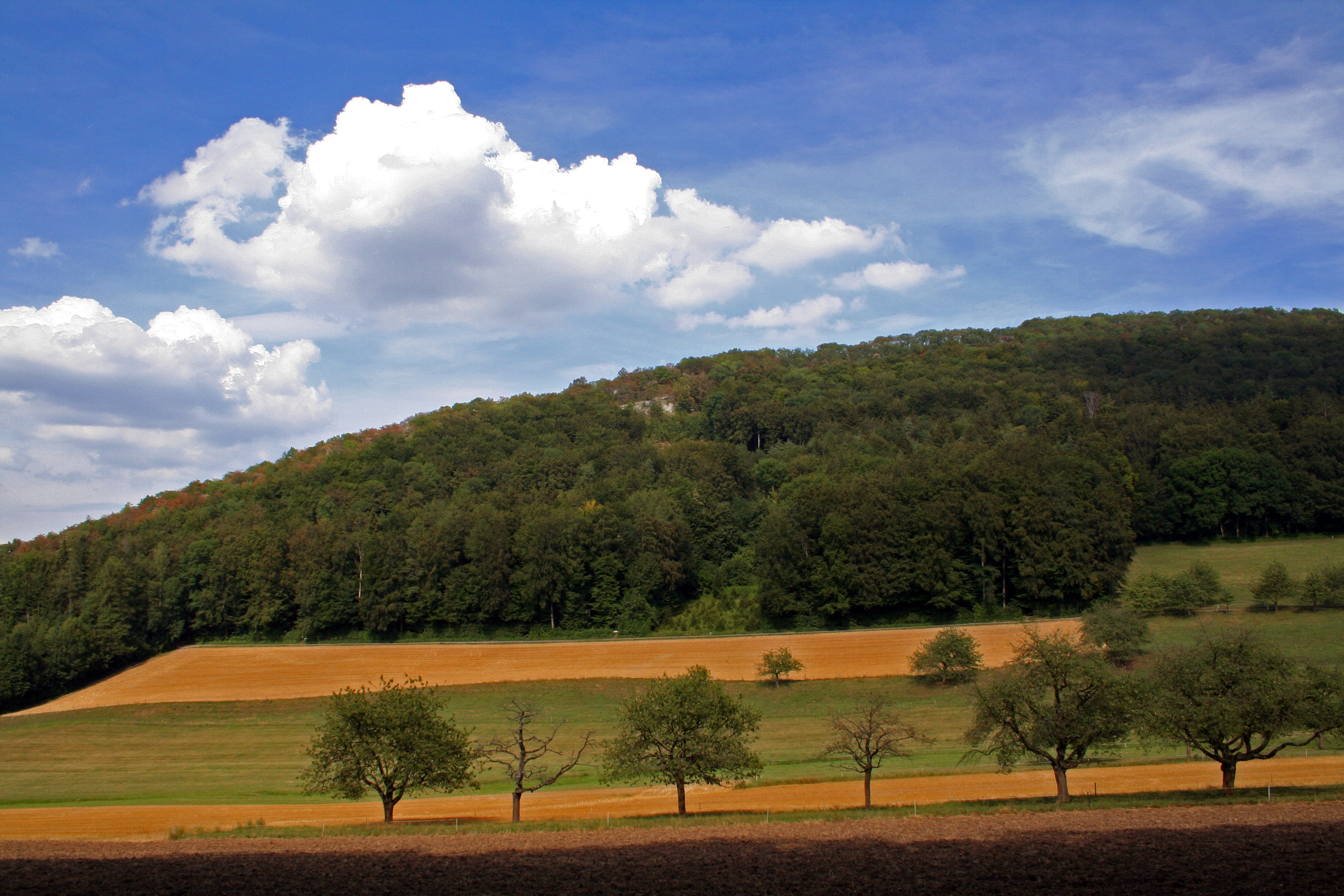
Engelberg mountain at Starrkirch-Wil

Starrkirch-Wil has an area, as of 2009, of 1.84 square kilometers (0.71 sq mi). Of this area, 0.42 km^{2} (0.16 sq mi) or 22.8% is used for agricultural purposes, while 0.89 km^{2} (0.34 sq mi) or 48.4% is forested. Of the rest of the land, 0.53 km^{2} (0.20 sq mi) or 28.8% is settled (buildings or roads).

Of the built up area, housing and buildings made up 18.5% and transportation infrastructure made up 7.1%. Power and water infrastructure as well as other special developed areas made up 1.1% of the area while parks, green belts and sports fields made up 2.2%. Out of the forested land, 47.3% of the total land area is heavily forested and 1.1% is covered with orchards or small clusters of trees. Of the agricultural land, 13.0% is used for growing crops and 8.7% is pastures, while 1.1% is used for orchards or vine crops.

The municipality is located in the Olten district, between the Aare river and the northern slope of the Engelberg mountain chain. It consists of the main villages of Starrkirch and Wil, settlement of Wartburg and the settlement around the ruins of Vordere Wartburg Castle, which is commonly called Sälischlössli.

== Coat of arms ==
The blazon of the municipal coat of arms is Azure a Church Argent massoned Sable.

== Demographics ==
Starrkirch-Wil has a population (as of December 2020) of 1,753. As of 2008, 11.8% of the population are resident foreign nationals. Over the last 10 years (1999–2009 ) the population has changed at a rate of 27.9%.

Most of the population (as of 2000) speaks German (1,170 or 93.4%), with Italian being second most common (27 or 2.2%) and Spanish being third (8 or 0.6%). There are 6 people who speak French.

As of 2008, the gender distribution of the population was 49.8% male and 50.2% female. The population was made up of 699 Swiss men (43.3% of the population) and 104 (6.4%) non-Swiss men. There were 716 Swiss women (44.4%) and 95 (5.9%) non-Swiss women. Of the population in the municipality 249 or about 19.9% were born in Starrkirch-Wil and lived there in 2000. There were 452 or 36.1% who were born in the same canton, while 372 or 29.7% were born somewhere else in Switzerland, and 144 or 11.5% were born outside of Switzerland.

In 2008 there were 12 live births to Swiss citizens and 5 births to non-Swiss citizens, and in same time span there were 14 deaths of Swiss citizens. Ignoring immigration and emigration, the population of Swiss citizens decreased by 2 while the foreign population increased by 5. There was 1 Swiss man and 2 Swiss women who emigrated from Switzerland. At the same time, there were 6 non-Swiss men who immigrated from another country to Switzerland and 1 non-Swiss woman who emigrated from Switzerland to another country. The total Swiss population change in 2008 (from all sources, including moves across municipal borders) was an increase of 25 and the non-Swiss population increased by 1 people. This represents a population growth rate of 1.6%.

The age distribution, as of 2000, in Starrkirch-Wil is; 102 children or 8.1% of the population are between 0 and 6 years old and 155 teenagers or 12.4% are between 7 and 19. Of the adult population, 69 people or 5.5% of the population are between 20 and 24 years old. 379 people or 30.2% are between 25 and 44, and 350 people or 27.9% are between 45 and 64. The senior population distribution is 147 people or 11.7% of the population are between 65 and 79 years old and there are 51 people or 4.1% who are over 80.

As of 2000, there were 451 people who were single and never married in the municipality. There were 702 married individuals, 57 widows or widowers and 43 individuals who are divorced.

As of 2000, there were 528 private households in the municipality, and an average of 2.4 persons per household. There were 132 households that consist of only one person and 19 households with five or more people. Out of a total of 531 households that answered this question, 24.9% were households made up of just one person and there were 2 adults who lived with their parents. Of the rest of the households, there are 185 married couples without children, 180 married couples with children There were 23 single parents with a child or children. There were 6 households that were made up of unrelated people and 3 households that were made up of some sort of institution or another collective housing.

In 2000 there were 305 single family homes (or 80.9% of the total) out of a total of 377 inhabited buildings. There were 48 multi-family buildings (12.7%), along with 16 multi-purpose buildings that were mostly used for housing (4.2%) and 8 other use buildings (commercial or industrial) that also had some housing (2.1%). Of the single family homes 26 were built before 1919, while 72 were built between 1990 and 2000. The greatest number of single family homes (53) were built between 1946 and 1960.

In 2000 there were 553 apartments in the municipality. The most common apartment size was 4 rooms of which there were 193. There were 8 single room apartments and 246 apartments with five or more rooms. Of these apartments, a total of 515 apartments (93.1% of the total) were permanently occupied, while 15 apartments (2.7%) were seasonally occupied and 23 apartments (4.2%) were empty. As of 2009, the construction rate of new housing units was 0 new units per 1000 residents. The vacancy rate for the municipality, in 2010, was 1.88%.

The historical population is given in the following chart:

== Politics ==
In the 2007 federal election the most popular party was the SP which received 29.54% of the vote. The next three most popular parties were the FDP (22.06%), the SVP (21.46%) and the CVP (14.97%). In the federal election, a total of 687 votes were cast, and the voter turnout was 61.5%.

== Economy ==
As of 2010, Starrkirch-Wil had an unemployment rate of 3%. As of 2008, there were 6 people employed in the primary economic sector and about 3 businesses involved in this sector. 21 people were employed in the secondary sector and there were 5 businesses in this sector. 243 people were employed in the tertiary sector, with 35 businesses in this sector. There were 678 residents of the municipality who were employed in some capacity, of which females made up 42.8% of the workforce.

In 2008 the total number of full-time equivalent jobs was 171. The number of jobs in the primary sector was 3, all of which were in agriculture. The number of jobs in the secondary sector was 16 of which 2 or (12.5%) were in manufacturing and 14 (87.5%) were in construction. The number of jobs in the tertiary sector was 152. In the tertiary sector; 18 or 11.8% were in wholesale or retail sales or the repair of motor vehicles, 6 or 3.9% were in the movement and storage of goods, 28 or 18.4% were in a hotel or restaurant, 6 or 3.9% were technical professionals or scientists, 13 or 8.6% were in education and 4 or 2.6% were in health care.

In 2000, there were 90 workers who commuted into the municipality and 600 workers who commuted away. The municipality is a net exporter of workers, with about 6.7 workers leaving the municipality for every one entering. Of the working population, 18.7% used public transportation to get to work, and 59.4% used a private car.

== Religion ==
From the 2000 census, 499 or 39.8% were Roman Catholic, while 409 or 32.6% belonged to the Swiss Reformed Church. Of the rest of the population, there were 5 members of an Orthodox church (or about 0.40% of the population), there were 34 individuals (or about 2.71% of the population) who belonged to the Christian Catholic Church, and there were 39 individuals (or about 3.11% of the population) who belonged to another Christian church. There were 24 (or about 1.92% of the population) who were Islamic. There were 2 individuals who were Buddhist. 206 (or about 16.44% of the population) belonged to no church, are agnostic or atheist, and 35 individuals (or about 2.79% of the population) did not answer the question.

== Education ==
In Starrkirch-Wil about 560 or (44.7%) of the population have completed non-mandatory upper secondary education, and 220 or (17.6%) have completed additional higher education (either university or a Fachhochschule). Of the 220 who completed tertiary schooling, 72.3% were Swiss men, 22.7% were Swiss women, 3.2% were non-Swiss men.

During the 2010-2011 school year there were a total of 162 students in the Starrkirch-Wil school system. The education system in the Canton of Solothurn allows young children to attend two years of non-obligatory Kindergarten. During that school year, there were 38 children in kindergarten. The canton's school system requires students to attend six years of primary school, with some of the children attending smaller, specialized classes. In the municipality there were 124 students in primary school. The secondary school program consists of three lower, obligatory years of schooling, followed by three to five years of optional, advanced schools. All the lower secondary students from Starrkirch-Wil attend their school in a neighboring municipality.

As of 2000, there was one student in Starrkirch-Wil who came from another municipality, while 71 residents attended schools outside the municipality.
