= Kantonales Kulturzentrum Palais Besenval =

Cantonal cultural center of Solothurn

Coordinates: 47.206769°N 7.538812°E

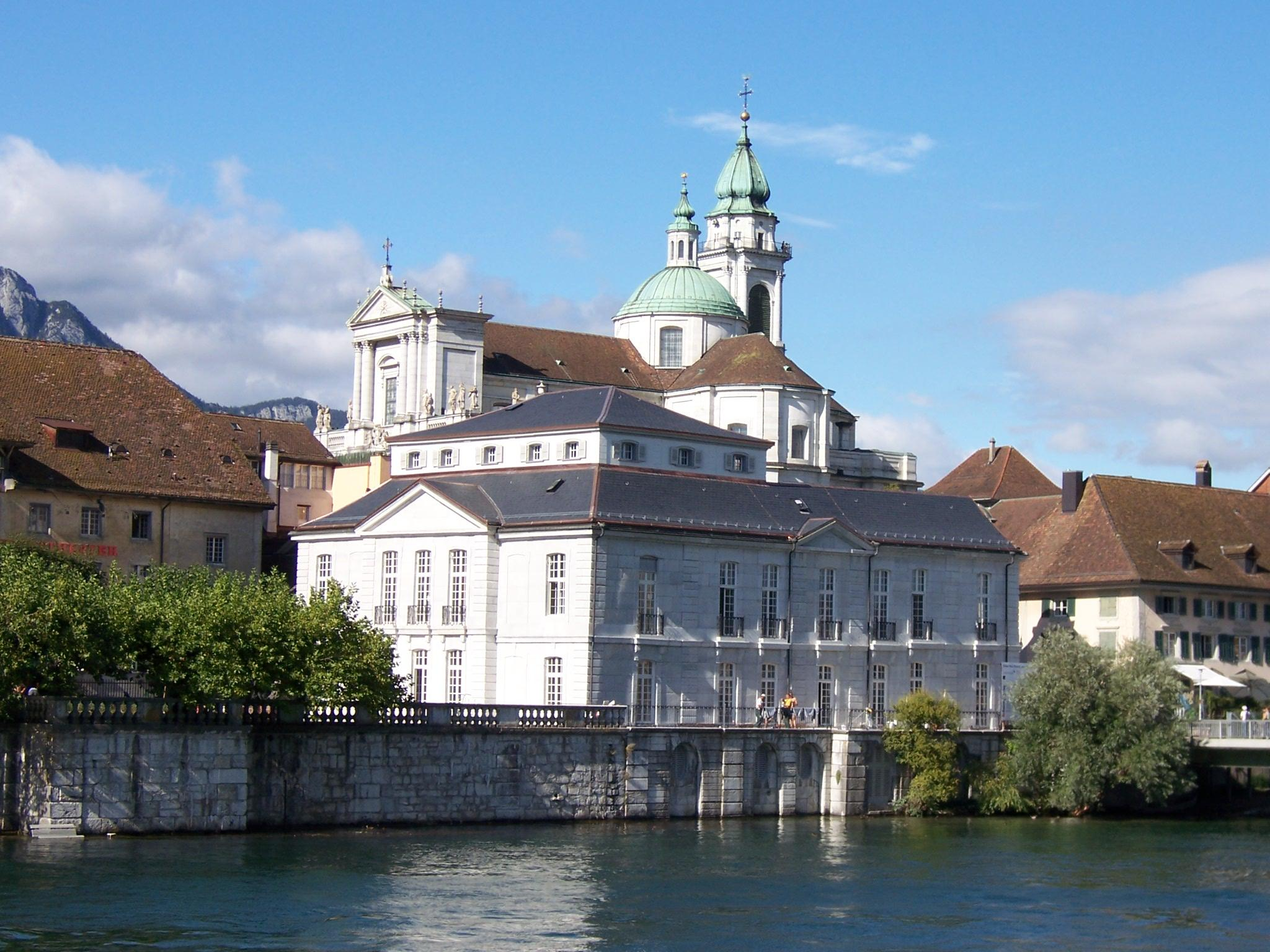
The Kulturzentrum was located in the Palais Besenval.

The Kantonales Kulturzentrum Palais Besenval (″Cantonal Cultural Center Palais Besenval″) was a state cultural center in the Swiss town of Solothurn that existed from 1990 to 2000. It was located in the Palais Besenval at Kronengasse 1 and served mainly as a Kunsthalle (art exposition hall).

== History ==
The cultural center was founded on May 6, 1990, by the Kuratorium für Kulturförderung des Kantons Solothurn (″Board of Trustees for Cultural Promotion of the Canton of Solothurn″). It occupied the ground floor (two exhibition rooms with a total of 230 m^{2} and a documentation center) and the garden (560 m^{2}) of the Palais Besenval, while the upper floor was occupied by the Solothurn Office of Justice. The logo of the cultural center was designed by Hans Küchler.

The purpose of the cultural center was the ″inner cantonal exchange of contemporary art″, the ″expansion of the cultural network within the canton″, the ″promotion of cultural exchange beyond the canton's borders″ and the ″documentation on art, culture and customs″. Like the Begegnungszentrum Waldegg for the intercantonal area, the Palais Besenval saw itself as an ″intra-cantonal bridge from person to person, from region to region...″ (Peter André Bloch, 1990). The cultural center mainly organized art exhibitions. Several times, the board of trustees combined fine art with literature, such as with the exposition of Friedrich Dürrenmatt′s Bilder, Zeichnungen und Skizzen (″pictures, drawings and sketches″) at the Solothurn Literature Days (1991), or the ″friendship of painters″ between Hermann Hesse and Cuno Amiet (1998).

After ten years of operation, the cultural center fell victim to the tax policy austerity package SO Plus: the Executive Council of Solothurn decided to close the cultural center and advertised the ground floor and the garden of the Besenval Palace for rent. With its exhibition Totentanz from April to May 2000, the cultural center heralded its end. On August 31, 2000, the Cantonal Cultural Center Palais Besenval was dissolved. In the following years, the canton centralized its cultural activities at Waldegg Castle.

== Exhibitions (selection) ==
Title	Year	Catalogue
Eröffnung des Palais Besenval	1990	OCLC 75598097
Friedrich Dürrenmatt: Bilder, Zeichnungen, Skizzen aus der Sammlung Hans und Kathy Liechti	1991	ISBN 9783952011911
Benno Geiger 1903–1979	1991	OCLC 84346861
Weissbuch Schwarzbubenland	1991	ISBN 9783952011904
Annemarie Würgler: plastische Arbeiten	1992	OCLC 983477580
Alois Winiger: „dein und mein Alltag“	1993	OCLC 83742770
Aussenwelten–Innenwelten: Landschaft in zeitgenössischer Kunst	1994	OCLC 75675114
Körpersprache: Ursula Baur, Marianne Flück-Derendinger, Rosmarie Gehriger, Sandra Meister, Barbara Meyer Cesta	1996	ISBN 9783952011997
Franz Anatol Wyss: Übersicht: Zeichnungen und Original-Druckgrafik zum Jubiläum 30 Jahre künstlerische Arbeit	1996	OCLC 80109908
Auf dem 47. Breitengrad	1997	OCLC 81374955
August Jaeger 1881–1954	1998	ISBN 9783906592008
Die Hoffnung stirbt zuletzt: Belarus im Jahre Zwölf nach Tschernobyl	1998	ISBN 9783855026371
Hermann Hesse und Cuno Amiet – eine Malerfreundschaft	1998	OCLC 313526364
Rom Foto	1998	ISBN 9783906592022
Meditationsweg Einsiedelei: der Solothurner Kreuzweg bei der Verena-Schlucht	1999	OCLC 1084736909
Oder in Venedig: Fotomontagen	1999	ISBN 9783858811141
