= Palais Besenval =

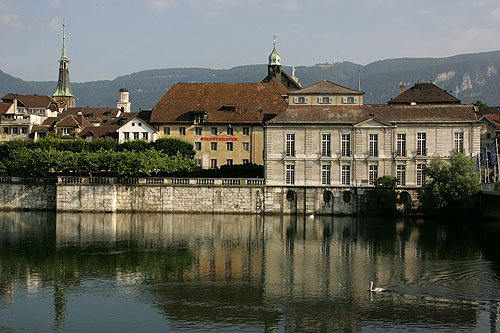
- Interactive map of the Palais Besenval area

General information
- Architectural style: Baroque architecture
- Location: Solothurn, Switzerland
- Coordinates: 47.206769°N 7.538812°E

The Palais Besenval is a baroque palace at Kronengasse 1 in the Swiss city of Solothurn.

== History ==
The palace is named after the brothers Johann Viktor II. Besenval (1671–1736) and Peter Joseph Besenval (1675–1736), on whose behalf the building was erected. It was built from 1703 to 1706 alongside the Aare as a hotel entre cour et jardin, modeled on French noble townhouses. The complex consists, from east to west, of the areas of the courtyard (Cour d’honneur), main wing (Corps de Logis) and a Baroque garden. The south facade of the two-storey palace facing the Aare is designed almost symmetrically.

After the death of the Besenval brothers in 1736, the palace passed to Peter Joseph's daughter Maria Johanna Margaritha Viktoria Besenval (1704–1793). She married the later mayor Franz Viktor Augustin von Roll (1700–1773), which brought the Palais to the von Roll family. Her only son Franz Joseph von Roll (1743-1815) took over the inheritance in 1793 and passed it on to his youngest son Friedrich von Roll (1773-1845) in 1815. During the Roll era, the Besenval coat of arms on the south facade gable was probably removed.

The canton of Solothurn bought the property in 1829 and the building became the residence of the Bishop of Basel. He resided in the palace until the Kulturkampf in 1873. From 1879 the building served as a student food house of the Kantonsschule Solothurn. After a public discussion about a possible demolition, the building was renovated and restored from 1950 to 1952 and then used by the cantonal administration. In 1988/89 the palace was renovated for use as a cantonal cultural center until 2000. It was renovated in 2005/06 and has since been used as a restaurant and seminar center. Before this renovation, an archaeological investigation of the area was carried out, which revealed a section of the medieval city wall.

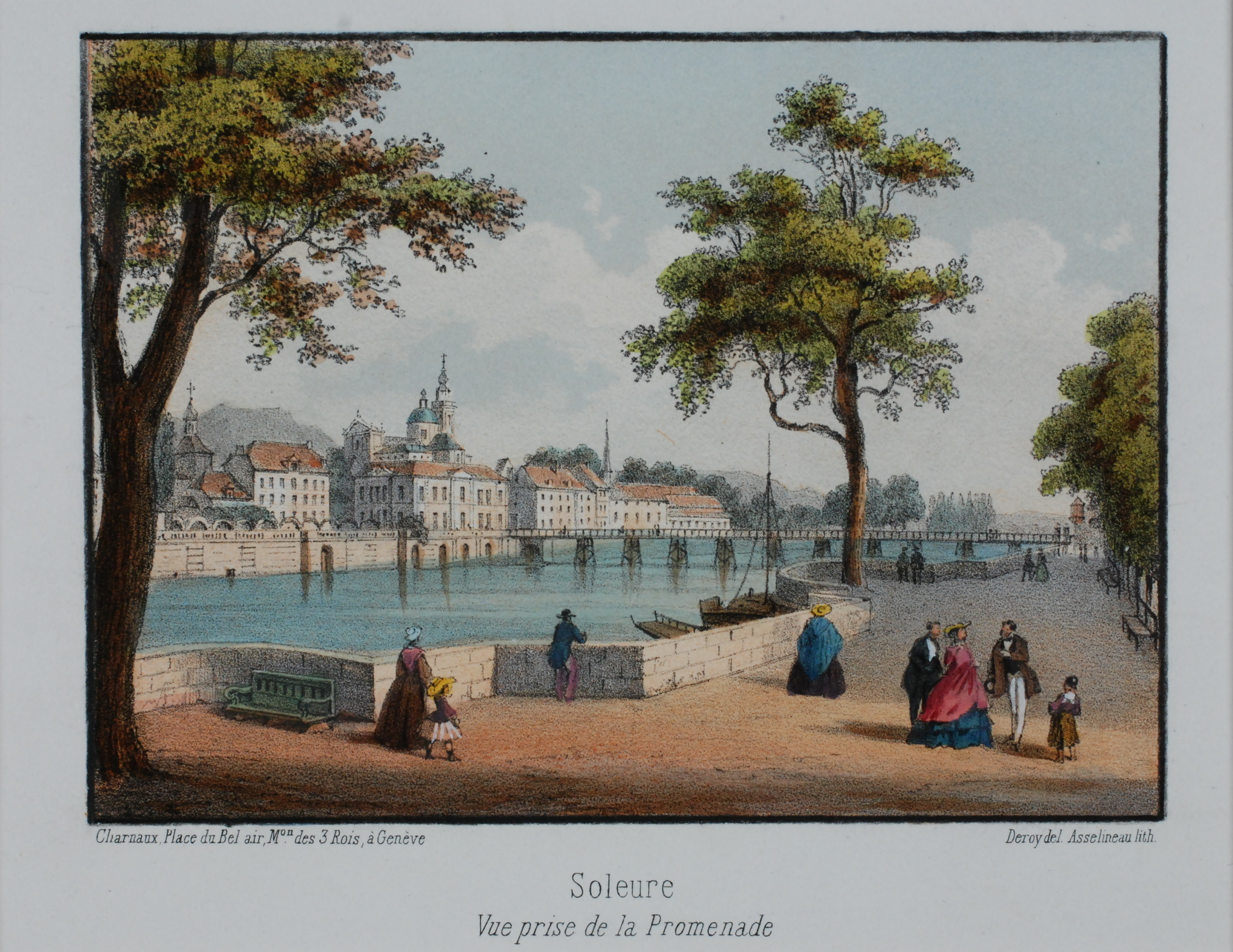
The Palais Besenval seen from the other bank of the river Aare, around 1850
