= List of mayors of Solothurn =

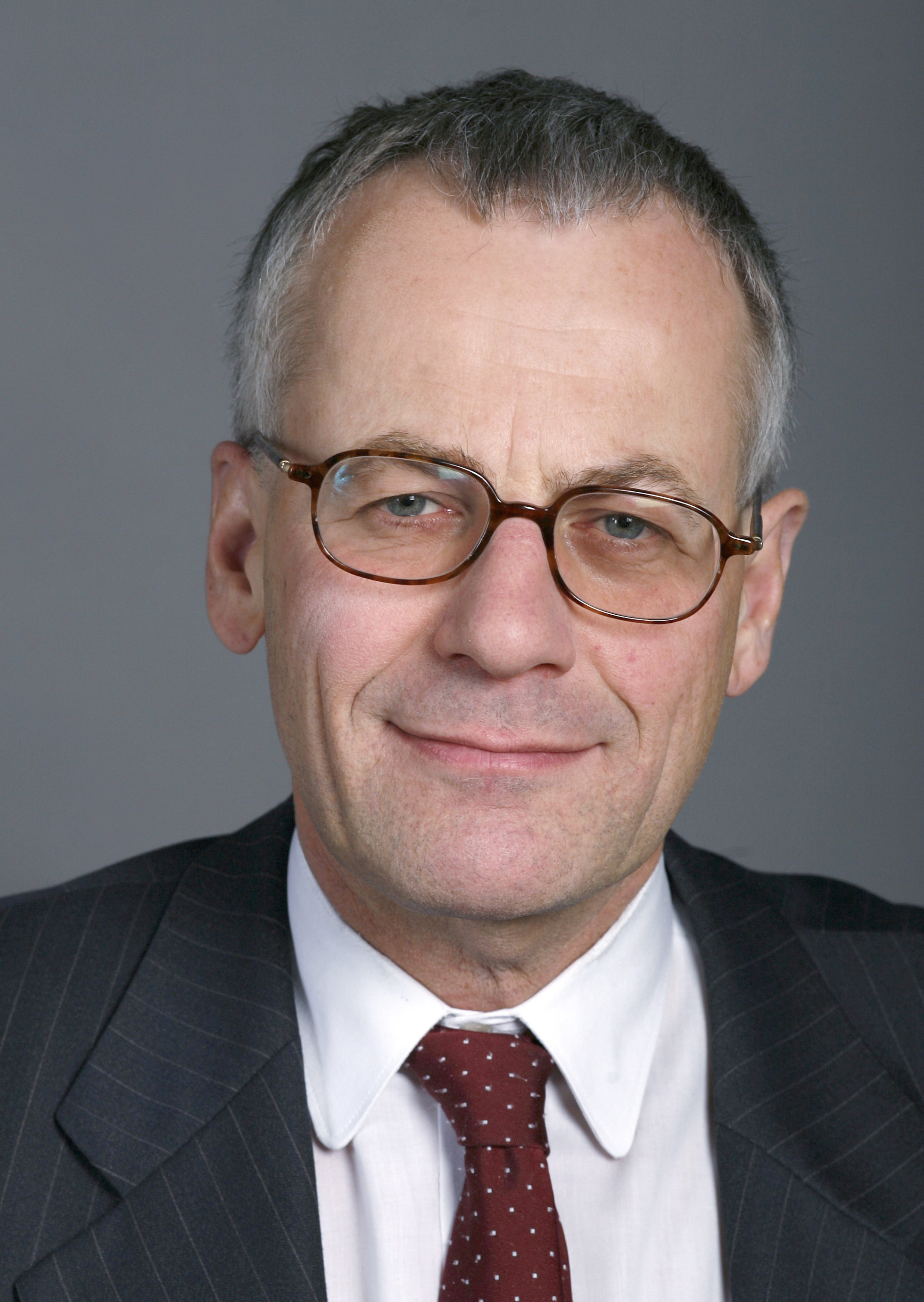
Kurt Fluri, mayor of Solothurn from 1993

Coat of arms of Solothurn

This is a list of mayors of the city of Solothurn, Switzerland. The mayor (Stadtpräsident, earlier Stadtammann) chairs the city council (Gemeinderat), Solothurn's executive with 30 members.

Mayor (Stadtpräsident/Stadtammann) of Solothurn
Term	Mayor	Lifespan	Party	Notes
1832–1839	Dominik Wysswald			
1840	Franz Bünzli	(1811–1872)		
1841–1844	Jakob Amiet-Lutiger			
1844–1871	Franz Bünzli	(1811–1872)		
1871–1875	Constanz Glutz von Blotzheim	(1825–1902)		
1875–1877	Josef von Sury	(1817–1887)	conservative	
1877–1892	Constanz Glutz von Blotzheim	(1825–1902)	conservative	
1892–1906	Wilhelm Vigier	(1839–1908)	radical-liberal	nephew of Wilhelm Vigier (1823–1886)
1906–1908	Johann Spillmann			
1908–1915	Hans Jecker	(1870–1946)	FDP/PRD	
1916–1933	Walter Hirt	(1869–1948)	FDP/PRD	
1933–1953	Paul Haefelin	(1889–1972)	FDP/PRD	
1953–1968	Robert Kurt	(died 1968)	FDP/PRD	
1969–1981	Fritz Schneider	(died 2003)	FDP/PRD	
1981–1992	Urs Scheidegger	(born 1943)	FDP/PRD	
1993–2021	Kurt Fluri	(born 1955)	FDP/PRD	
