= Kurt Fluri =

Swiss politician (born 1955)

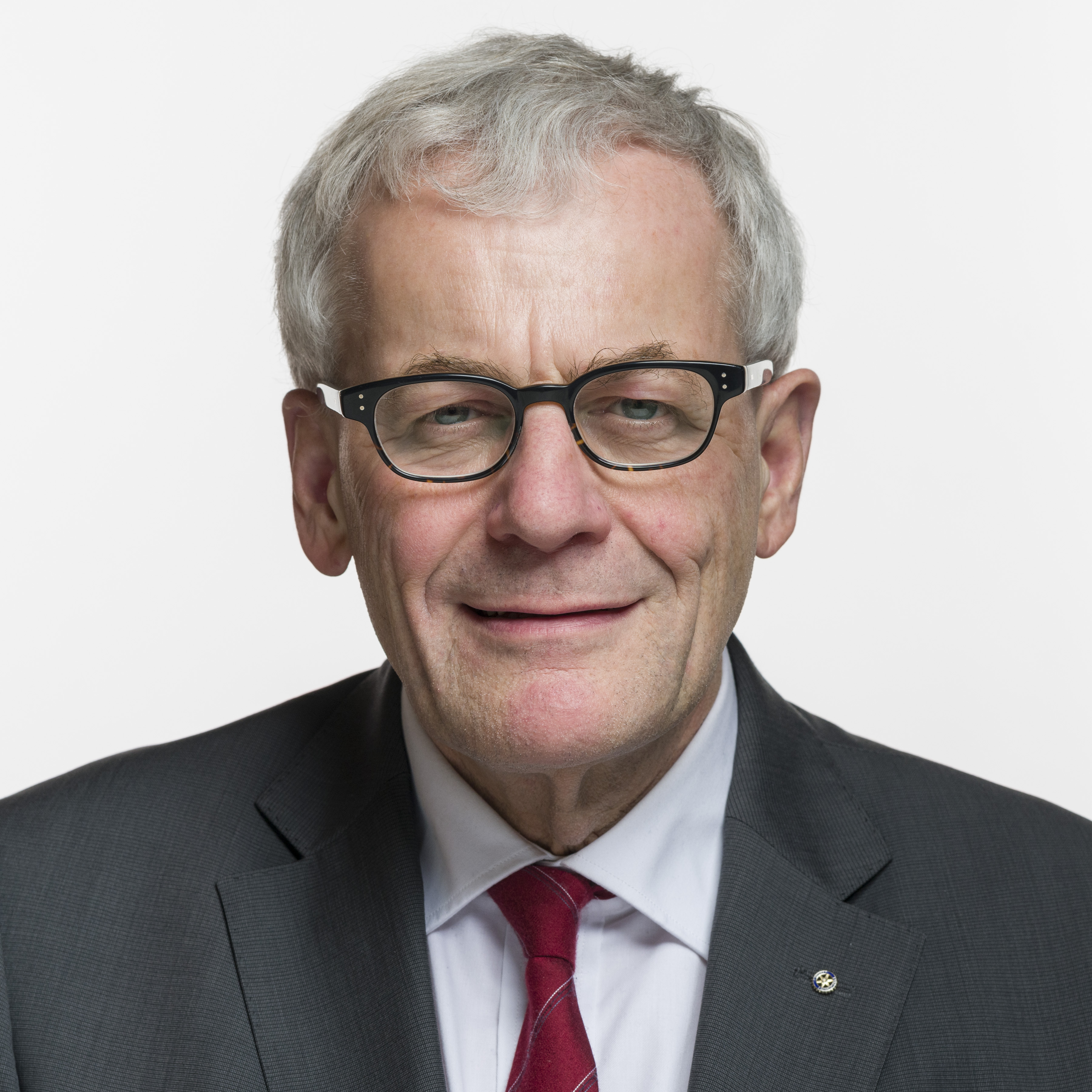
Kurt Fluri (2019)

Kurt Fluri (born August 1955 in Solothurn) is a Swiss politician of FDP.The Liberals (FDP), and a member of the National Council of Switzerland.

Fluri studied law at the University of Bern and University of Basel. He became a lawyer and notary of the canton of Solothurn after nine years as a lawyer. In 1985 he was elected to the Municipal Council of the town of Solothurn, and in 1989, he was elected to the cantonal parliament of Solothurn. He was also Chairman of the FDP group from 1999 to 2003. From 1993 to 2021 he was mayor of Solothurn. After his election to the National Council, 2003, he gave up his seat in the cantonal parliament. Kurt Fluri is active today in the national Staatspolitischen Kommission and the Commission for Legal Affairs in the National Council.
