= Solothurn =

Town in Switzerland

- Municipality
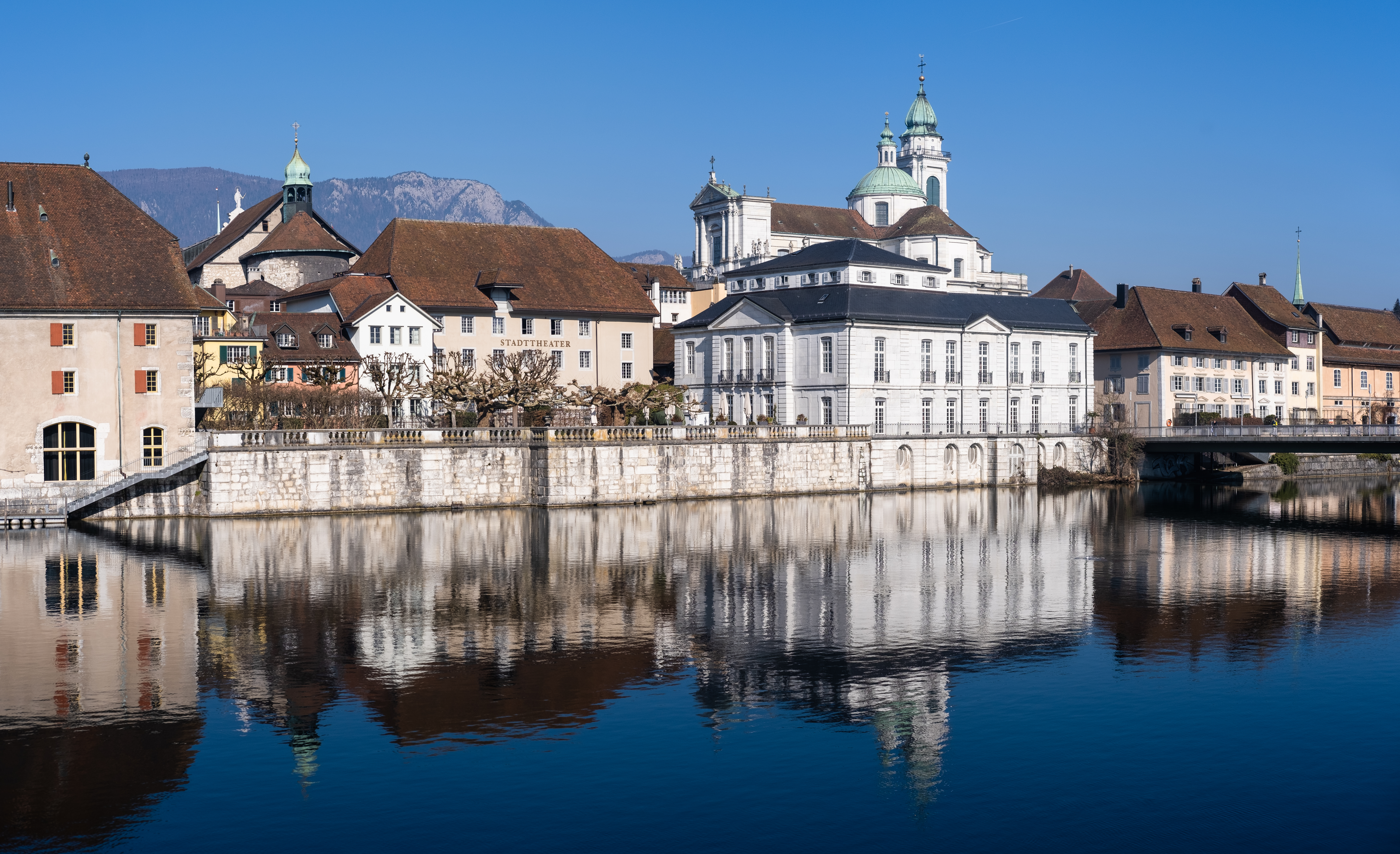
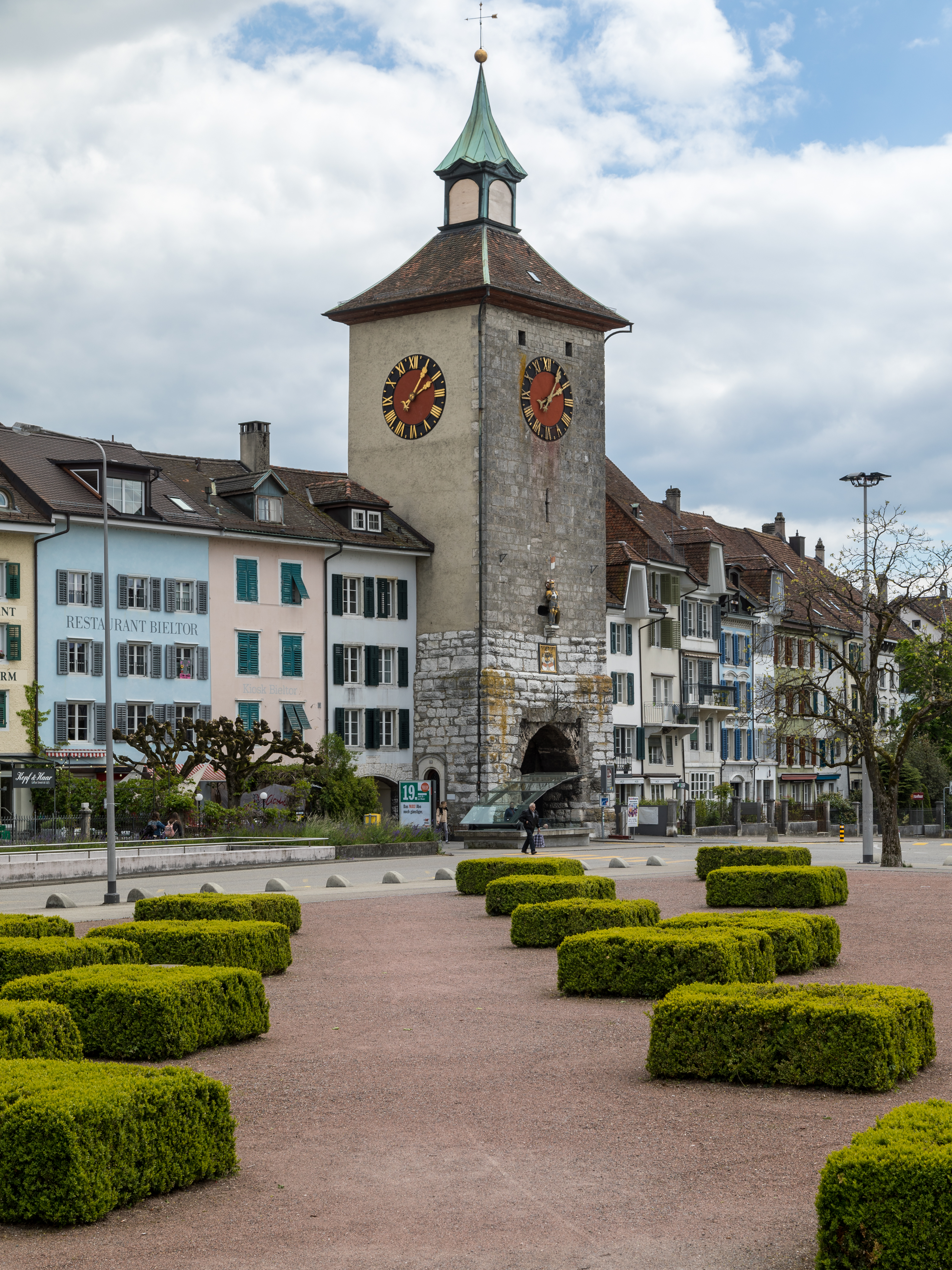
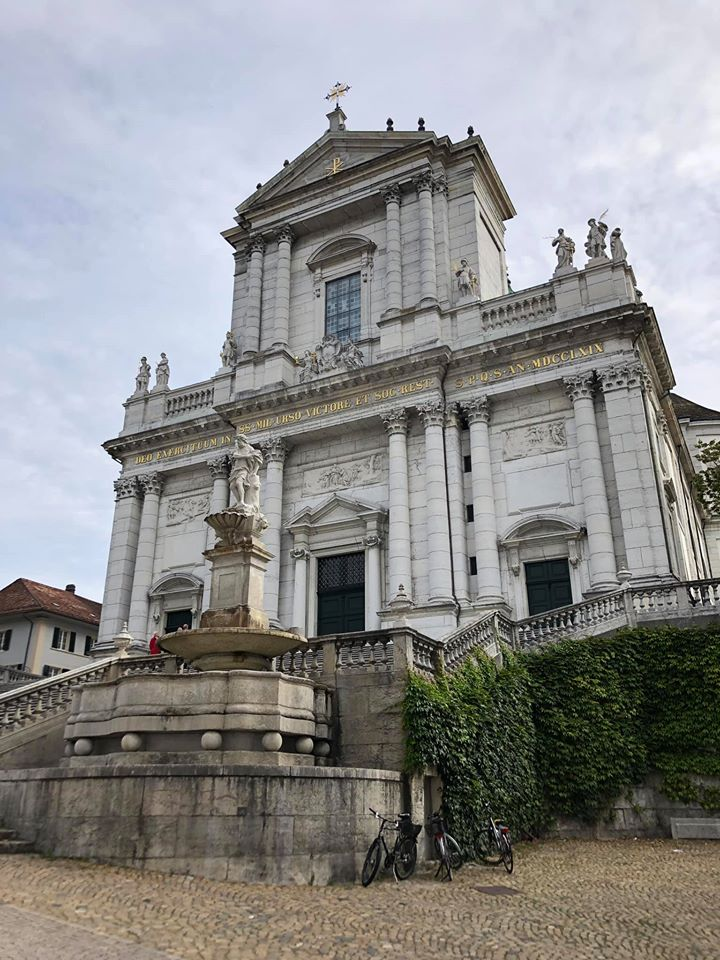
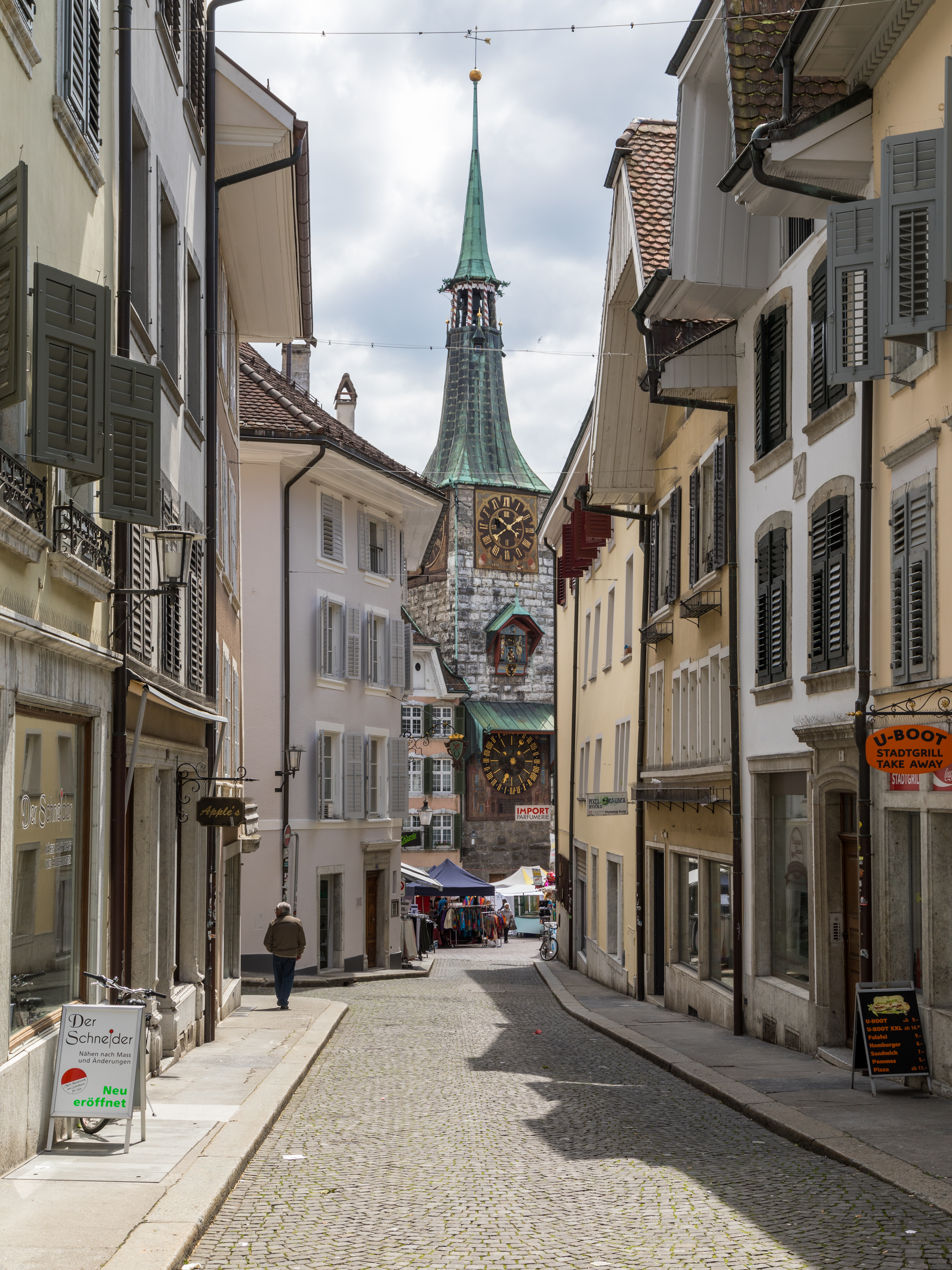
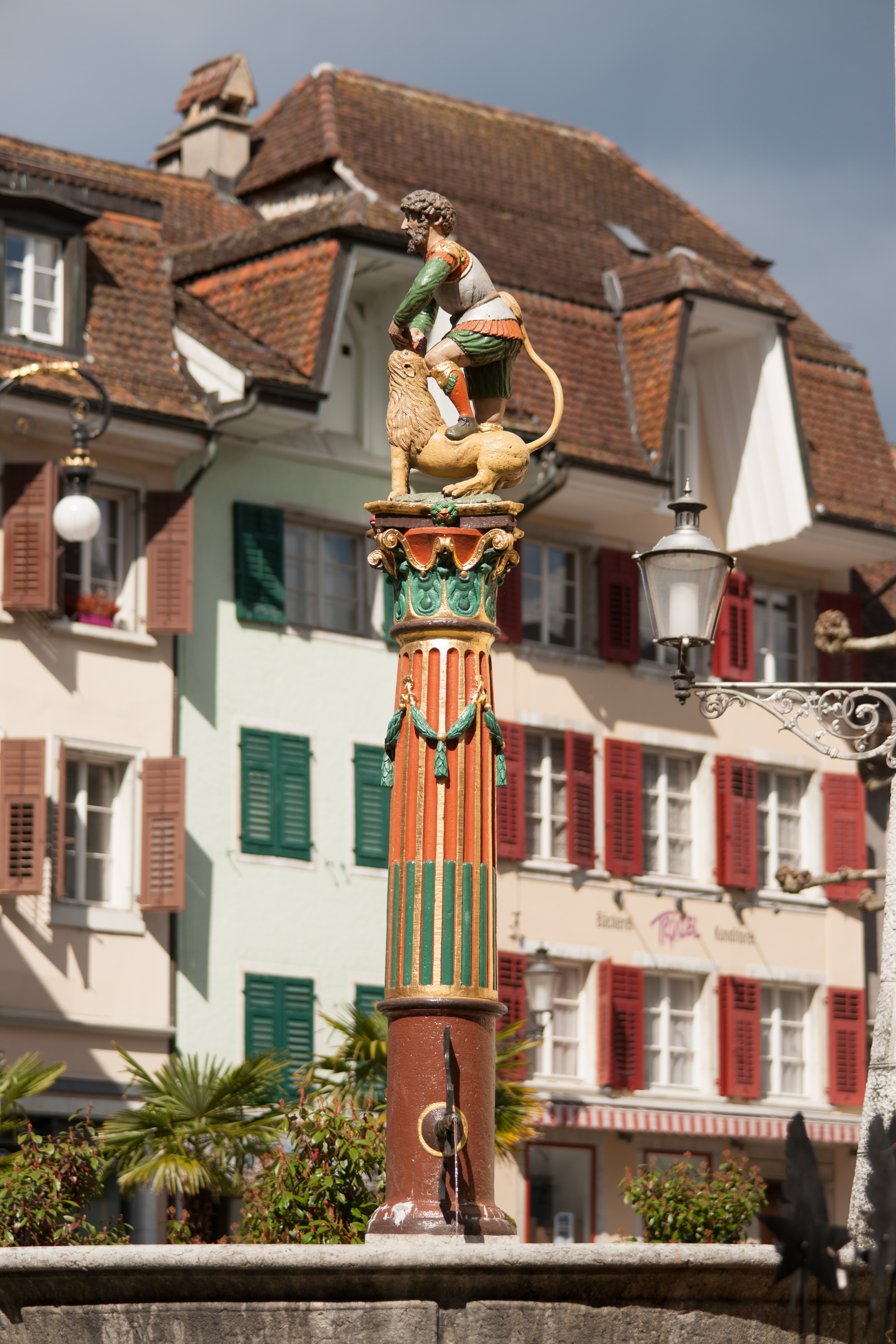
- Clockwise from top: Aare river and St. Ursus cathedral (background); St. Ursus Cathedral; Simson fountain; Old town street and Zeitglockenturm; Biel gate tower (Bieltorturm)

- Flag Coat of arms
- Location of Solothurn
- Location within Switzerland Location within Canton of Solothurn
- Coordinates: 47°12′30″N 7°32′14″E
- Country: Switzerland
- Canton: Solothurn
- District: Solothurn

Government
  - Executive: Gemeinderat with 30 members
  - Mayor: Stadtpräsidentin (list); Stefanie Ingold SPS/PSS (as of 2021)
  - Parliament: none (Gemeindeversammlung)

Area
  - Total: 6.28 km^{2} (2.42 sq mi)
- Elevation (Chapel of St Peter): 432 m (1,417 ft)

Population (December 2020)
  - Total: 16,802
  - Density: 2,680/km^{2} (6,930/sq mi)
- Demonym: German: Solothurner(in)
- Time zone: UTC+01:00 (CET)
  - Summer (DST): UTC+02:00 (CEST)
- Postal code: 4500
- SFOS number: 2601
- ISO 3166 code: CH-SO
- Surrounded by: Bellach, Biberist, Feldbrunnen-Sankt Niklaus, Langendorf, Rüttenen, Zuchwil
- Twin towns: Heilbronn (Germany), Kraków (Poland), Le Landeron (Switzerland)
- Website: www.stadt-solothurn.ch

Solothurn (/ˈsoʊlətʊərn, ˈzoʊ-/ SOH-lə-toorn, ZOH-; Swiss Standard German: [ˈzoːlotʊrn]; French: Soleure [sɔlœʁ]; Italian: Soletta [soˈletta]; Romansh: Soloturn) is a town, a municipality, and the capital of the canton of Solothurn in Switzerland. It is located in the north-west of Switzerland on the banks of the Aare and on the foot of the Weissenstein Jura Mountains.

The city is the only municipality of the district of the same name.

The city got its name from Salodurum, a Roman-era settlement. From 1530 to 1792 it was the seat of the French ambassador to Switzerland. The pedestrian-only old town was built between 1530 and 1792 and shows an impressive array of Baroque architecture, combining Italian Grandezza, French style, and Swiss ideas. The city has eighteen structures listed as heritage sites.

== History ==
=== Pre-Roman settlement ===
The oldest finds from Solothurn probably date from the Paleolithic era. The remains of a Mesolithic camp were discovered in 1986 during renovations of the former Kino Elite building. From the Neolithic, Bronze and Iron Age, only a few scattered items have been discovered.

=== Roman settlement ===
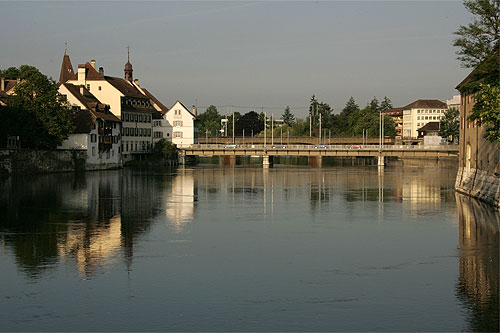
Modern Wengi bridge; the Roman bridge was north of this point.

The Roman settlement at Solothurn was probably built around AD 15–25 as a road station and bridge head on the road from Aventicum to Augusta Raurica or Vindonissa. A small vicus or settlement quickly developed around the castrum. Solothurn is first mentioned in 219 as vico salod[uro] on the so-called Eponastein. The name may indicate either that a Celtic settlement existed on the site before or just be a testimony to the mixed Gallo-Roman culture in the north-west provinces of the Roman Empire. It came to be known as Salodurum, this name believed to derive from a Celtic language, possibly meaning "Salo's fort," from the personal name Salo + Proto-Celtic *dūnom, meaning "fort" or "stronghold," likely influenced by the Latin durus, meaning "hard" or "strong," as in other place names. Its strategical importance lay in the position at the approach to the Rhine from southeast. In the 2nd–3rd century AD, the vicus expanded rapidly to fill almost all of what is now the old town of Solothurn, including a portion of today's suburb south of the Aare.

The Roman bridge was probably somewhat above the current Wengibrücke. The Roman era river bed was 40–80 meters (130–260 ft) north of the present Aare. The main street of the Vicus was well below the present main street. In addition to the normal government of the settlement, there were two mayors (magistri), and a six-member college (seviri Augustales), which was entrusted with supporting the imperial cult. Salodurum was also home to a guard detachment of the XXII Legion, whose high command was stationed in Mainz in Germany. According to inscriptions, there was a temple of Jupiter, a temple of Apollo Augustus and an altar to the goddess of horses Epona, who was popular in the Roman military and of Celtic origin. However, the locations of those three temples is not known. There was bath house on the main street and a pottery district in the northwest of the town which have been documented archaeologically. A cemetery with urns and cremation burials on the eastern end of the Vicus was discovered in 1762–63 during the demolition of the old church of St. Ursus. In addition, two Roman tombs were discovered in the same area.

Around 325–350, the unfortified settlement along the road was transformed into a fortified camp or castrum, which covered only half of the former settlement area. A 2–3 meters (6.6–9.8 ft) thick and 9 m (30 ft) high wall was built around the settlement. The new, fortified town was bell-shaped, and is still visible in the cadastral map of the town. At various points in the town, large and small pieces of the old Roman wall are still visible in the houses of the old town. The location of a gate in the north and a tower in the south-east corner are known and it is likely that there were additional gates and towers. Almost nothing is known about the buildings inside the walls.

=== Early Middle Ages ===
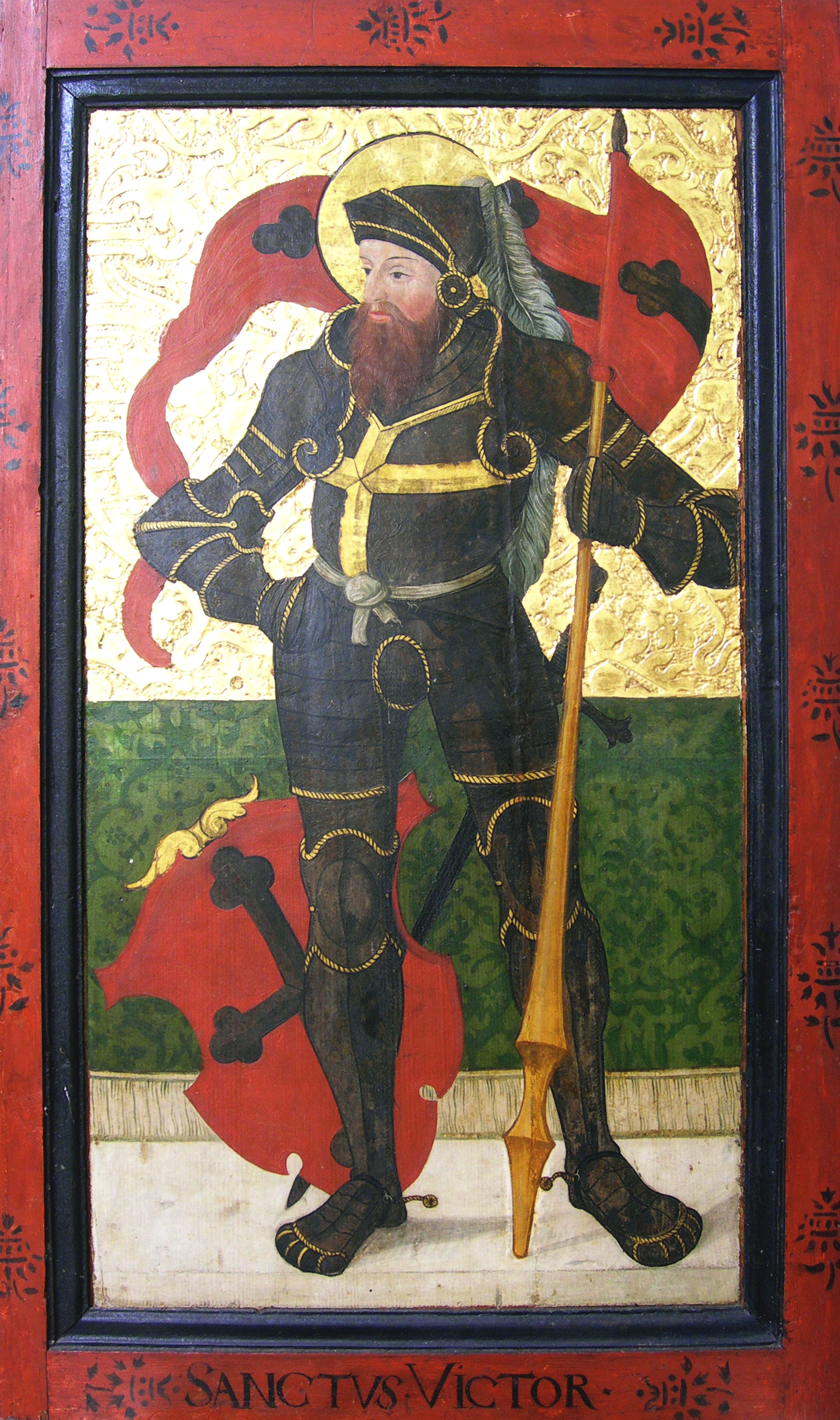
St. Victor of Solothurn

In the Early Middle Ages there were two settlement centres, a secular settlement in the former castrum and a religious settlement on the grounds of the late-Roman cemeteries outside the walls. Both the religious histories and archeological discoveries indicate that both areas remained inhabited continuously into the Early Middle Ages. The former chapel of St. Stephen inside the castrum was built on the foundation of an earlier, late-Roman building. A burial memorial in the cemetery of the nearby St. Peter's Chapel dates to around the collapse of the Roman Empire. By the middle of the 5th century, St. Eucherius of Lyon mentions the martyrdom of St. Ursus and St. Victor and a cult of saints in Solothurn. About 500 AD, the Burgundian Princess Sedeleuba took the bones of St. Victor to Geneva, while the bones of St. Ursus remained in Solothurn. The church dedicated to the veneration of Saint Ursus is first mentioned in 870.

=== Medieval city ===
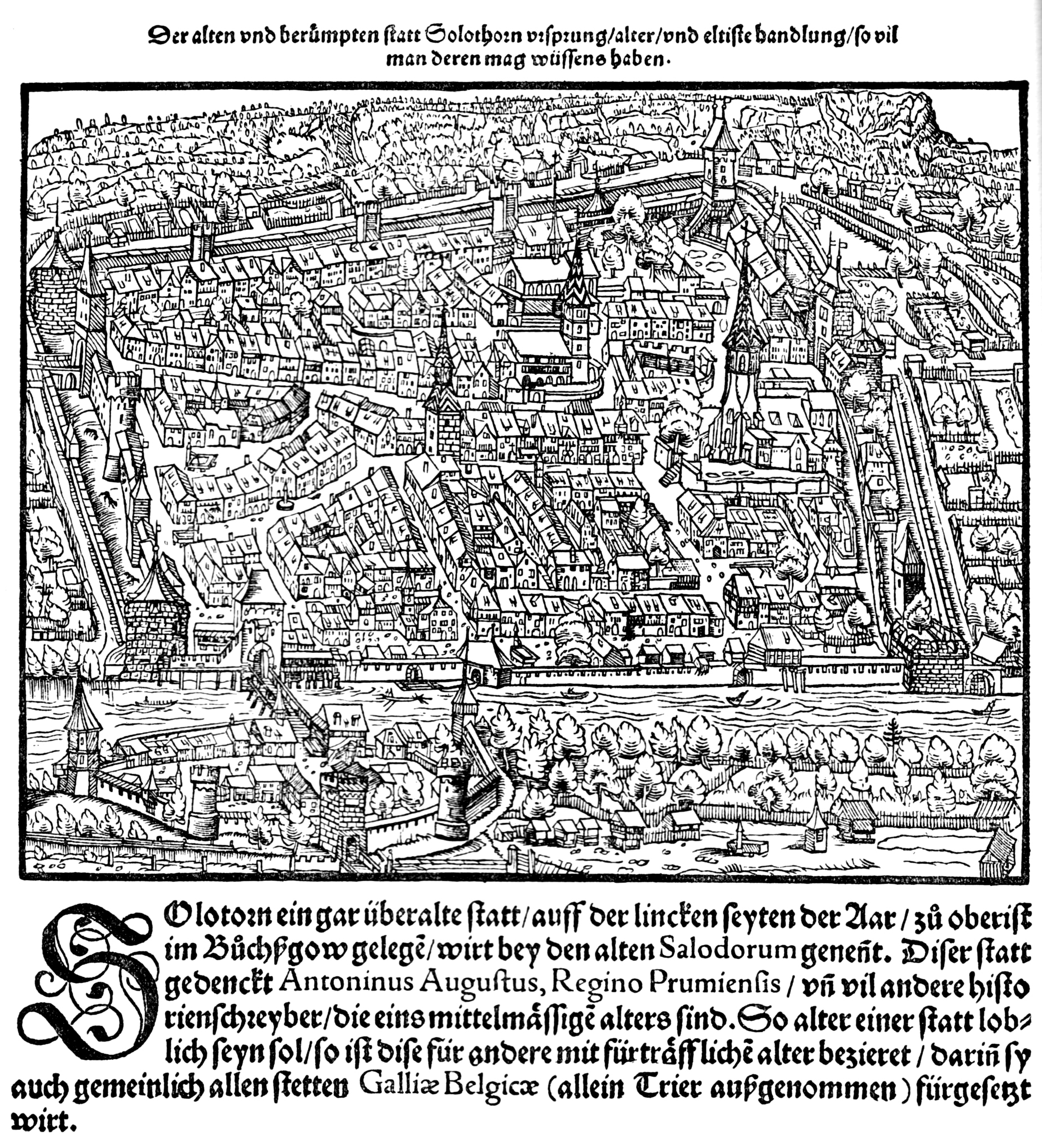
Solothurn in 1548

During the Early Middle Ages, Solothurn was part of the Kingdom of Lotharingia (Lorraine). After the collapse of Lotharingia, it became part of the Second Kingdom of Burgundy. In 1033, the Kingdom of Burgundy became part of the Holy Roman Empire and Solothurn gained some independence. In 1038, Emperor Conrad II held court at Solothurn and there crowned his son, Henry III King of Burgundy. The royal court resided in Solothurn on several occasions until 1052, however, there is no evidence of a permanent royal palace. In 1127, it was acquired by the dukes of Zähringen. Under the rule of the Zähringens, in 1146, Solothurn's coins are first mentioned. In 1182, causidicus or Zähringen appointed judges first appeared in Solothurn. After the extinction of the Zähringer line in 1218 it became a free imperial city under the Holy Roman Emperor. In 1252, the town council and Schultheiss or mayor became mostly independent and had their own town seals. In 1251 it was mentioned as saluerre and in 1275 as Solotren. Starting around 1200, there was a council of nobles in the town.

In 1252, a group of nobles that could witness and support deeds, known as consuls et cives Solodorenses, first appears in the town. Initially the nobles exercised power over the entire town. However, the guild movement of the 14th century resulted in a reduction in the power of the nobles and also a restricted guild system in Solothurn. By around 1350, an eleven-member Altrat (Council of Elders) and a 22-member Jungrat (Younger Council) existed in the city. Each of the eleven guilds were represented by a member of the Altrat and two members of the Jungrat. These 33 councillors exercised, together with the mayor, the power of government and helped appoint lawmakers. The members of the two councils were elected each year by the citizens of the city, after which the councils and mayor appointed many of the government officials. The noble families retained some power as the guilds became part of the city council. However, in 1459 the last noble family died out and positions on the council fell to wealthy farmers, butchers and millers.

Until the pogrom on 1348 during an outbreak of the plague, there was a small Jewish community in Solothurn.

Over the 13th to 15th centuries, the citizens of the city slowly emancipated themselves from the higher nobility. In 1276 and 1280 Emperor Rudolf I codified the previously poorly defined rights of the city and granted it the privilege de non Evocando or the right that their citizens were protected from trial in foreign courts. In 1344 Solothurn acquired the right to appoint their own Schultheiss from the Count of Buchegg, which was confirmed by Emperor Charles IV in 1360. In 1409, Emperor Ruprecht extended the de non Evocando privilege to include the royal High Court as well.

As the city grew in power, it bound the Monastery of St. Ursus more closely to the city. In 1251 the city defeated claims made by the Monastery on the right to appoint the Schultheiss. Shortly after the acquisition of the right to the Schultheiss office in 1344, the city came into possession of the vogt right over the Monastery by granting citizenship rights to the former vogt (bailiff), Burkhard Senn the Elder. In 1512–20 the city received the right to appoint canons and provosts from the Pope.

After the alliance with Bern in 1295, it became part of the Swiss Confederation. In 1382 the Habsburgs attacked the city, involving Solothurn in the Battle of Sempach. By the treaty of two years later, the Habsburgs renounced all claims to the territory of the city. The latter was expanded by acquisition of neighbouring lands in the 15th century, roughly up to the today's canton area.

In 1481, it obtained full membership in the Swiss Confederation.

=== Buildings in the medieval city ===
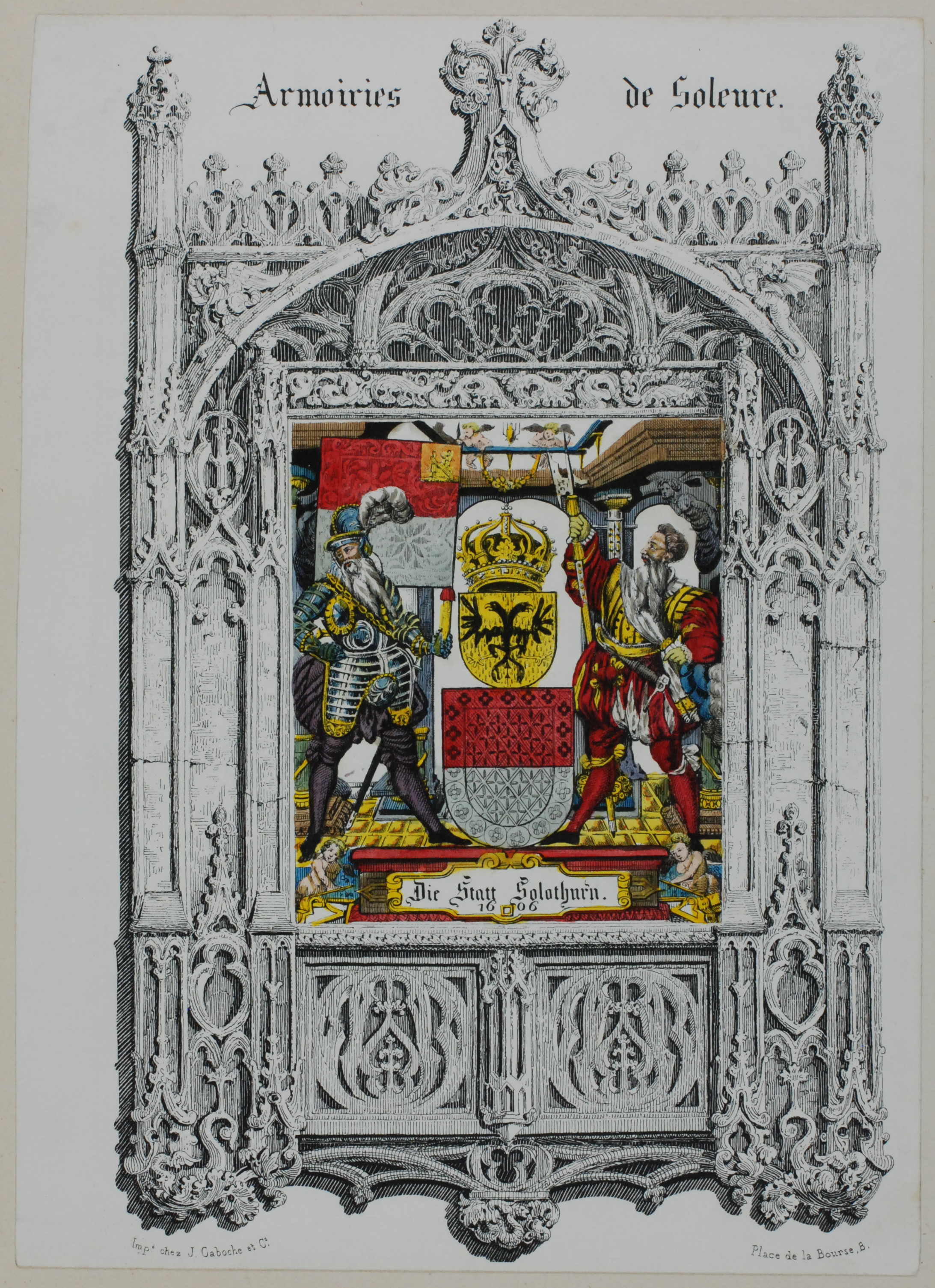
17th-century coat of arms of the city.

Before 1200 there was a Zähringer fortified tower north of the Monastery of St. Ursus. In the first half of the 13th century, a city wall was built around the area of the former castrum as well as the adjoining industrial area to the east and the churches of St. Peter and St. Urs. Near the Monastery of St. Ursus, a Franciscan monastery was built, and after 1280 it formed the northern city wall on the eastern part of the city. In 1532, the French embassy with a church and stately home was built in the eastern half of the city. In the western part of Solothurn, the city hall was built. First it was along the main street and in 1476 it moved south of the Franciscan monastery. A main market place grew up along the main street, and in the first half of the 17th century it moved to the northern banks of the Aare. The city hall, market place and clock tower formed the political and economic centre of city life.

=== Early modern Solothurn ===
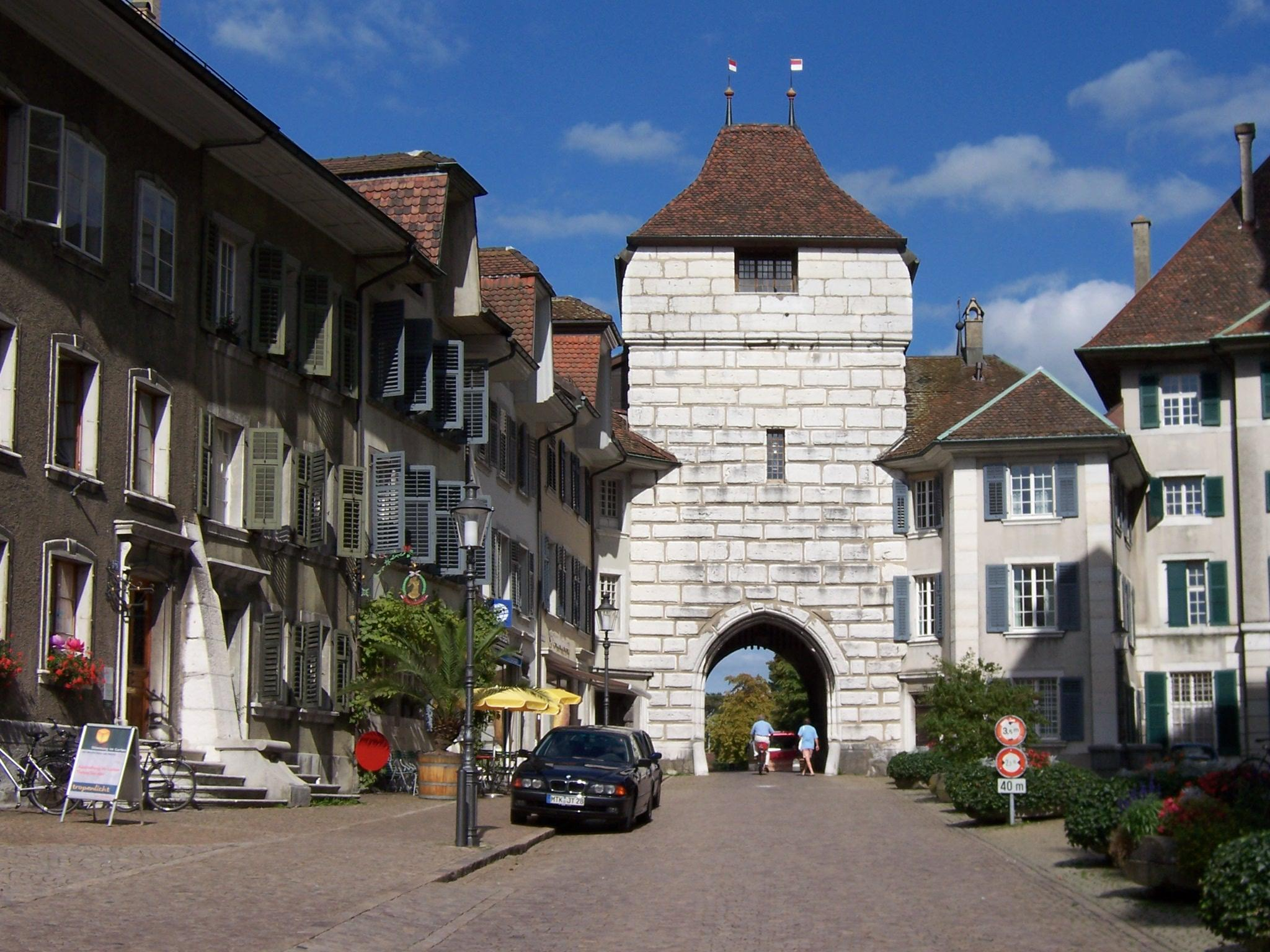
The Basel gate was added in the 16th century

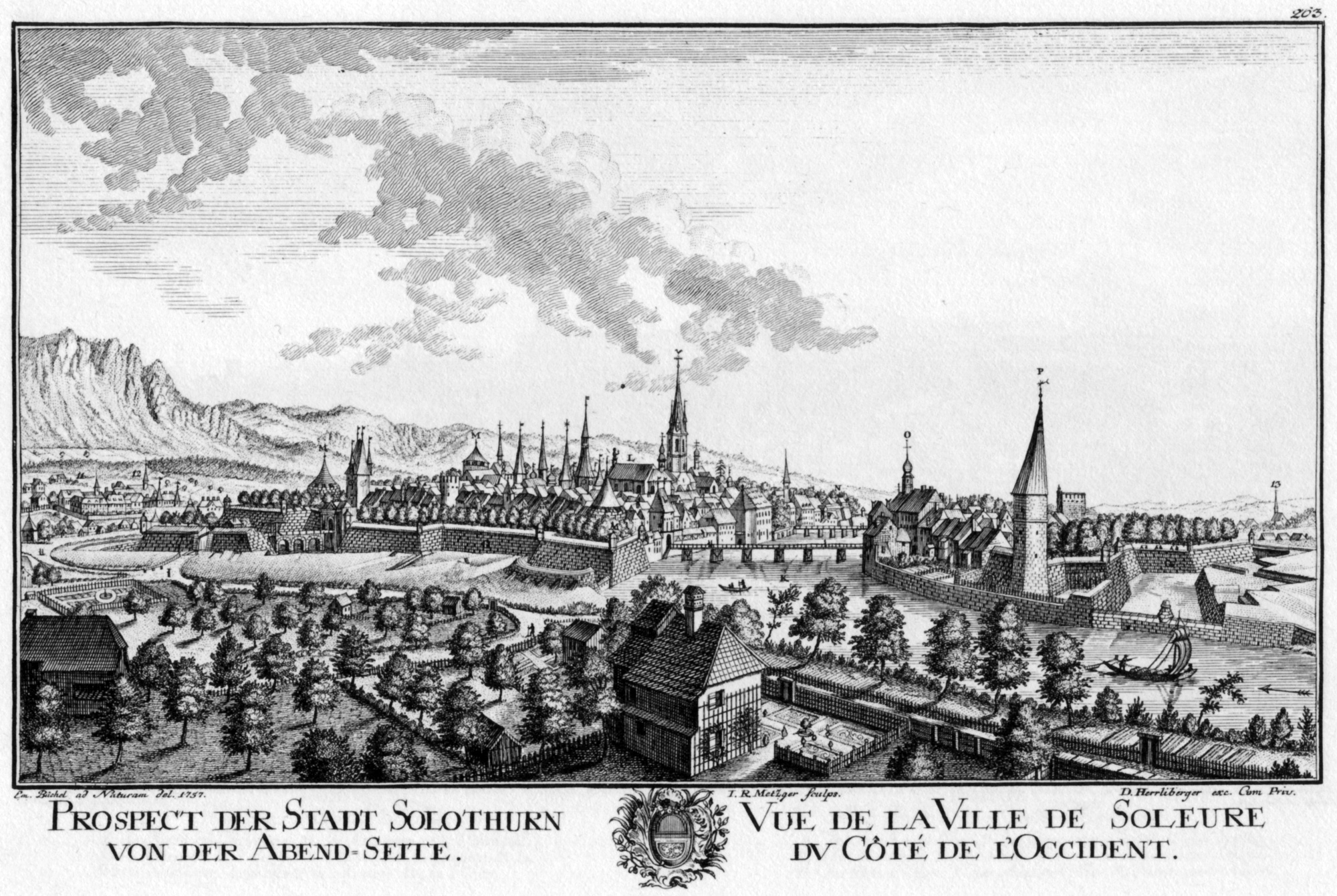
Solothurn in 1757

The medieval cooperative election of the mayor and councillors led to the creation of a nearly hereditary oligarchy by the 15th century. By the second half of the 16th century, the political voice of citizens was nearly totally suppressed. By the second half of the 17th century, the government was run by a small group of patricians. The oligarchs were weakened in the 18th century, when in 1718–21 the city council managed to regain some powers. However, in 1682, a new citizenship law prevented wealthy families who had moved into Solothurn from becoming members of the council. While this law reduced the number of people who could be on the city council, the introduction of a secret ballot procedure in 1764 and measures against vote-buying in 1774 allowed more and more non-patrician burghers to join the council.

During the heyday of the patricians in the 17th and 18th centuries, a number of elegant town houses (Reinert House 1692–93, Palais Besenval 1703–06) and summer residences outside the city (Sommerhaus Vigier 1648–50, Waldegg Castle 1682–86 (now in nearby Feldbrunnen-St. Niklaus), Steinbrugg Castle 1665–68 and Blumenstein Castle 1725–28) were built. A number of new public buildings were also added including; the Arsenal (1610–19), the city hall (Rathaus) with its north staircase tower (1632–34) and its eastern façade (Archive tower 1624, completed 1703–14), the Jesuit church (1680–89), the new Ambassadorenhof (1717–24), the Holy Spirit Hospital in a suburb (1735–1800) and the new classicist Church of St. Ursus (1763–90). In the 16th century the city walls were reinforced with the Basel gate and three round towers.

Between 1667 and 1727, following plans by Francesco Polatta, Jacques Le Prestre Tarade and Sébastien de Vauban, the city built fortifications with eleven full and half bastions. The new city wall increased the size of the city by including the eastern suburb of Kreuzacker. Until the 18th century, prisoners were housed in the towers of the medieval and early modern fortifications store. Between 1753 and 1761 a new prison was built outside the city walls, which remained in use into the 20th century. A gallows was first mentioned in 1460 and was located northeast of the city near Feldbrunnen. A second gallows was located to the southwest of the city.

From 1530 to 1792 it was the seat of the French ambassador to Switzerland.

The early modern period in Solothurn ended, as in the rest of Switzerland, with the French invasion in 1798.

=== Modern Solothurn ===
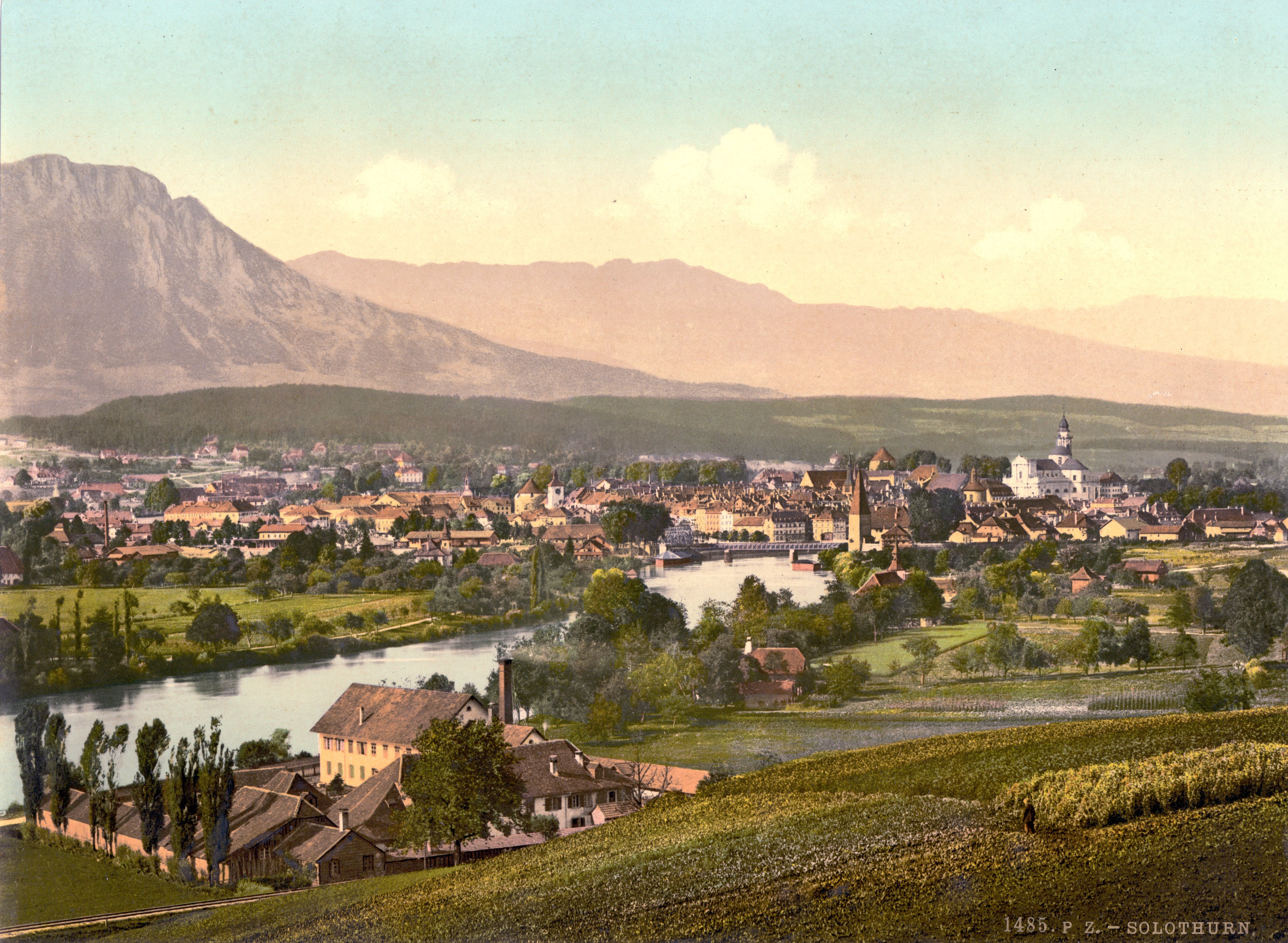
Solothurn in 1900

Following the capitulation of Solothurn on 2 March 1798, the French General Balthazar Alexis Henri Schauenburg set up a provisional government on the following day. The new government met in April to set up the new constitution. The eleven old Vogtei (baillywicks) were replaced by five districts: Solothurn, Biberist, Balsthal, Olten, and Dornach. The municipal Bürgergemeinde laid claim to the assets of the defunct city-state and in 1801 it received the Sönderungsconvention, large estates and extensive forest land outside the town. In 1831 the cantonal parliament withdrew all political power from the eleven city guilds. Over the following years (1831–1842) all the guilds were dissolved. Due to the municipal law of 1859, the enforcement of the Federal Constitution of 1874 and the Cantonal Constitution of 1875, an Einwohnergemeinde was created. The Einwohnergemeinde included all residents of the town, as opposed to the more limited Bürgergemeinde. The division of property between residents and the Bürgergemeinde proved to be lengthy and could not be completed until 1978 and then only with the help of the Executive Council.

In 1828 Solothurn became the seat of the Bishop of Basel.

Since 1897, the municipal council has been elected by proportional voting and consists of 30 members and 15 alternate members. As the executive body, it elects the council commission (seven members). Mayor and Vice-Mayor are elected by the people. The municipal assembly is the legislative body. The composition of the council remained remarkably stable between 1917 and 1973. The Liberals held an average of 60% of the seats, the Social Democrats and the Conservative People's Party (CVP today), about 20% each. In 1970, the municipality granted voting rights for women. With the emergence of new parties, the Liberals lost its dominant position. 2009, the FDP 30%, SP 23%, CVP 23%, the Greens 17% and 7% of the votes go to the SVP.

Rock band Krokus was formed in Solothurn in 1974.

== Geography ==
Aerial view (1947)

Solothurn has an area, as of 2009, of 6.28 square kilometers (2.42 sq mi). Of this area, 1.42 km^{2} (0.55 sq mi) or 22.6% is used for agricultural purposes, while 0.17 km^{2} (0.066 sq mi) or 2.7% is forested. Of the rest of the land, 4.37 km^{2} (1.69 sq mi) or 69.6% is settled (buildings or roads), 0.33 km^{2} (0.13 sq mi) or 5.3% is either rivers or lakes.

Of the built up area, industrial buildings made up 4.1% of the total area while housing and buildings made up 38.5% and transportation infrastructure made up 17.5%. Power and water infrastructure as well as other special developed areas made up 1.9% of the area while parks, green belts and sports fields made up 7.5%. Out of the forested land, 0.5% of the total land area is heavily forested and 2.2% is covered with orchards or small clusters of trees. Of the agricultural land, 14.2% is used for growing crops and 7.0% is pastures, while 1.4% is used for orchards or vine crops. All the water in the municipality is flowing water.

Solothurn is located in the north-west of Switzerland on the banks of the Aare and on the foot of the Weissenstein Jura Mountains.

== Coat of arms ==
The blazon of the municipal coat of arms is Per fess Gules and Argent.

== Demographics ==
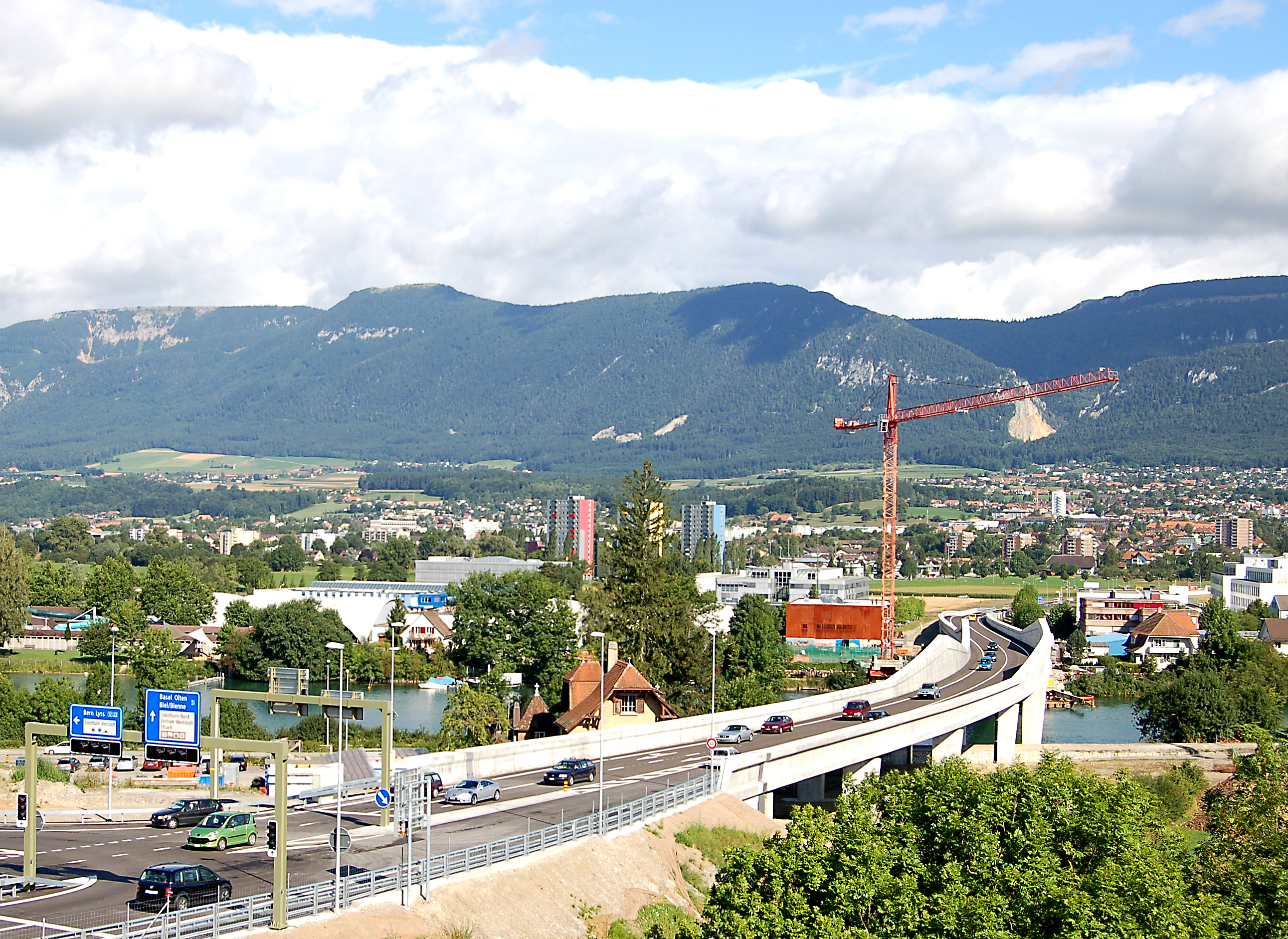
Aare Bridge and a newer section of Solothurn

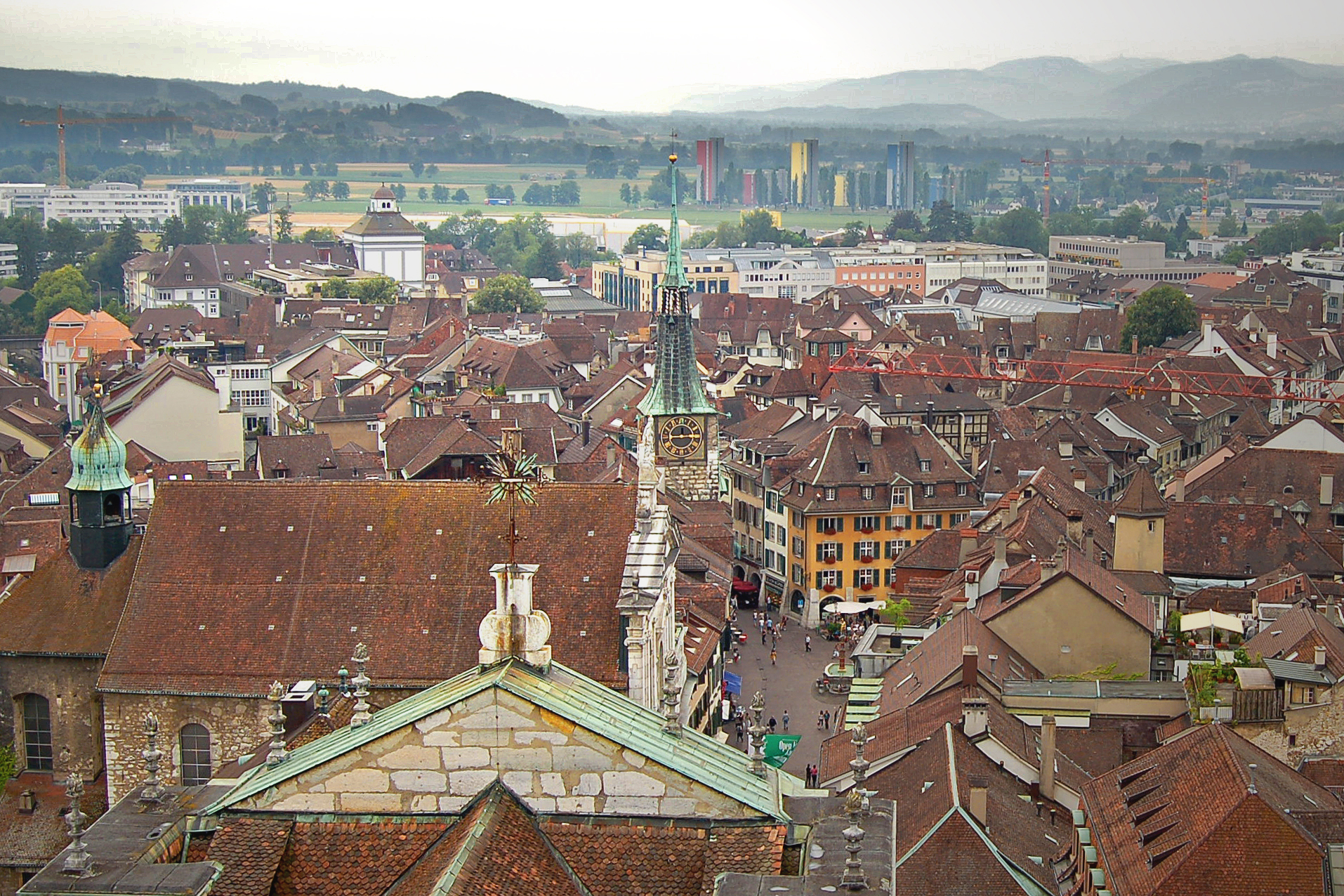
View over the old town of Solothurn

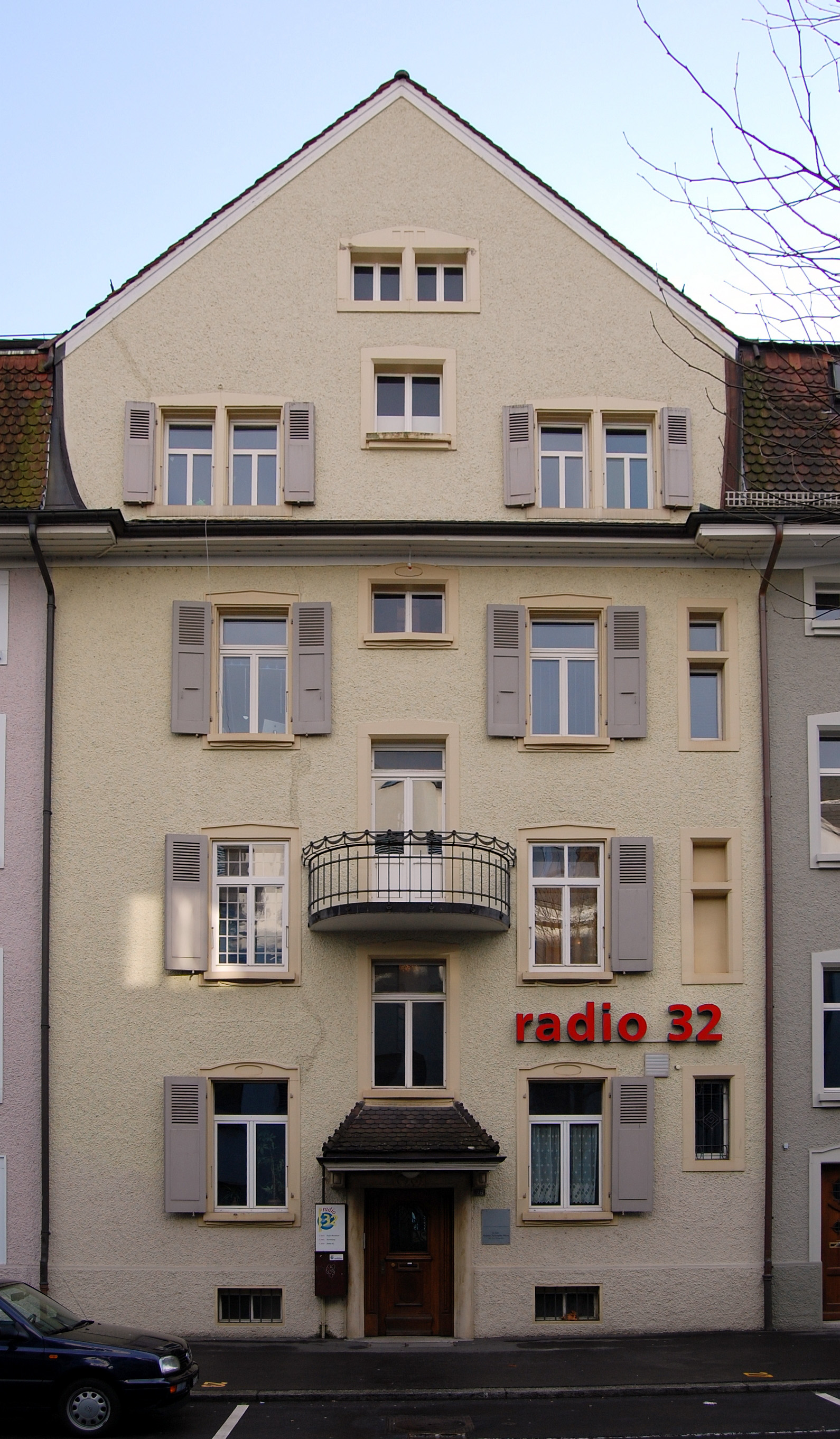
Radio 32 building in Solothurn

Solothurn has a population (as of December 2020) of 16,802. As of 2008, 21.1% of the population are resident foreign nationals. Over the last 10 years (1999–2009) the population has changed at a rate of 4.4%.

Most of the population (as of 2000) speaks German (13,270 or 85.7%), with Italian being second most common (469 or 3.0%) and Albanian being third (261 or 1.7%). There are 193 people who speak French and 19 people who speak Romansh.

As of 2008, the gender distribution of the population was 48.1% male and 51.9% female. The population was made up of 5,891 Swiss men (37.0% of the population) and 1,775 (11.1%) non-Swiss men. There were 6,669 Swiss women (41.8%) and 1,604 (10.1%) non-Swiss women. Of the population in the municipality 3,864 or about 24.9% were born in Solothurn and lived there in 2000. There were 3,630 or 23.4% who were born in the same canton, while 4,135 or 26.7% were born somewhere else in Switzerland, and 3,193 or 20.6% were born outside of Switzerland.

In 2008 there were 115 live births to Swiss citizens and 27 births to non-Swiss citizens, and in same time span there were 190 deaths of Swiss citizens and 10 non-Swiss citizen deaths. Ignoring immigration and emigration, the population of Swiss citizens decreased by 75 while the foreign population increased by 17. There were 8 Swiss men and 13 Swiss women who immigrated back to Switzerland. At the same time, there were 91 non-Swiss men and 78 non-Swiss women who immigrated from another country to Switzerland. The total Swiss population change in 2008 (from all sources, including moves across municipal borders) was an increase of 98 and the non-Swiss population increased by 161 people. This represents a population growth rate of 1.7%.

The age distribution, as of 2000, in Solothurn is; 913 children or 5.9% of the population are between 0 and 6 years old and 2,013 teenagers or 13.0% are between 7 and 19. Of the adult population, 888 people or 5.7% of the population are between 20 and 24 years old. 4,832 people or 31.2% are between 25 and 44, and 3,678 people or 23.7% are between 45 and 64. The senior population distribution is 2,068 people or 13.4% of the population are between 65 and 79 years old and there are 1,097 people or 7.1% who are over 80.

As of 2000, there were 6,784 people who were single and never married in the municipality. There were 6,403 married individuals, 1,144 widows or widowers and 1,158 individuals who are divorced.

As of 2000, there were 7,447 private households in the municipality, and an average of 1.9 persons per household. There were 3,468 households that consist of only one person and 303 households with five or more people. Out of a total of 7,625 households that answered this question, 45.5% were households made up of just one person and there were 49 adults who lived with their parents. Of the rest of the households, there are 1,907 married couples without children, 1,455 married couples with children. There were 405 single parents with a child or children. There were 163 households that were made up of unrelated people and 178 households that were made up of some sort of institution or another collective housing.

In 2000 there were 1,311 single family homes (or 44.3% of the total) out of a total of 2,957 inhabited buildings. There were 838 multi-family buildings (28.3%), along with 441 multi-purpose buildings that were mostly used for housing (14.9%) and 367 other use buildings (commercial or industrial) that also had some housing (12.4%). Of the single family homes 161 were built before 1919, while 62 were built between 1990 and 2000. The greatest number of single family homes (443) were built between 1919 and 1945.

In 2000 there were 8,586 apartments in the municipality. The most common apartment size was 3 rooms of which there were 2,954. There were 728 single room apartments and 1,634 apartments with five or more rooms. Of these apartments, a total of 7,272 apartments (84.7% of the total) were permanently occupied, while 794 apartments (9.2%) were seasonally occupied and 520 apartments (6.1%) were empty. As of 2009, the construction rate of new housing units was 3.3 new units per 1000 residents. As of 2003 the average price to rent an average apartment in Solothurn was 980.18 Swiss francs (CHF) per month (US$1043, £760, €852) approx. exchange rate from March 4, 2018). The average rate for a one-room apartment was 568.85 CHF (US$605, £438, €495), a two-room apartment was about 725.13 CHF (US$772, £558, €631), a three-room apartment was about 904.51 CHF (US$962, £696, €787) and a six or more room apartment cost an average of 1564.78 CHF (US$1665, £1204, €1361). The average apartment price in Solothurn was 87.8% of the national average of 1116 CHF. The vacancy rate for the municipality, in 2010, was 0.45%.

== Historical population ==
The historical population is given in the following chart:

== Main sights ==
The old town was built between 1530 and 1792 and shows an architectural combination of Italian Grandezza, French style and Swiss ideas.

In 1980, Solothurn was awarded the Wakker Prize for the development and preservation of its architectural heritage.

Solothurn is home to 18 structures that are listed as Swiss heritage sites of national significance. The religious buildings on the list are; the Visitation Convent, the Jesuit Church with Kollegium (Lapidarium), the Swiss Reformed Church on Westringstrasse and the St. Ursen Cathedral. There are four civic buildings on the list; the old Armory which is now the Cantonal Museum, the Rathaus (city hall), the State Archives at Bielstrasse 41 and the nearby Central Library at Bielstrasse 39. Two other museums are on the list, the Art Museum and the Naturmuseum. There are two houses and two public objects on the list; the Haller-Haus (former Bishops Palace) at Baselstrasse 61, the Sommerhaus Vigier at Untere Steingrubenstrasse 21, the Mauritius Fountain and the town clock tower. Two castles are listed; the former Blumenstein Castle and Steinbrugg Castle. Finally, the list includes the old town of Salodurum which was a Roman era Vicus and the medieval and early modern city as well as the city walls. The entire old city of Solothurn is part of the Inventory of Swiss Heritage Sites.

Sights include:

- Aarhof
- Besenval Palace
- Cathedral of St. Ursus (1762–73). It was begun by Gaetano Matteo Pisoni and completed by Paolo Antonio Pisoni. The interior has stuccoes by Francesco Pozzi and canvasses by Domenico Corvi.
- Church of the Jesuits (Jesuitenkirche, 1680–89)
- Clock tower (Zeitglockenturm, 12th century)
- Gate of Basel
- Gate of Bienne
- Kosciuszko Museum
- Krone
- Landhaus
- Museum of the Old Arsenal (1609–14), housing the most ancient collection of armour in Europe.
- Old town
- The Verena Gorge and the Verena Gorge Hermitage
- Waldegg Castle
- Weissenstein mountain
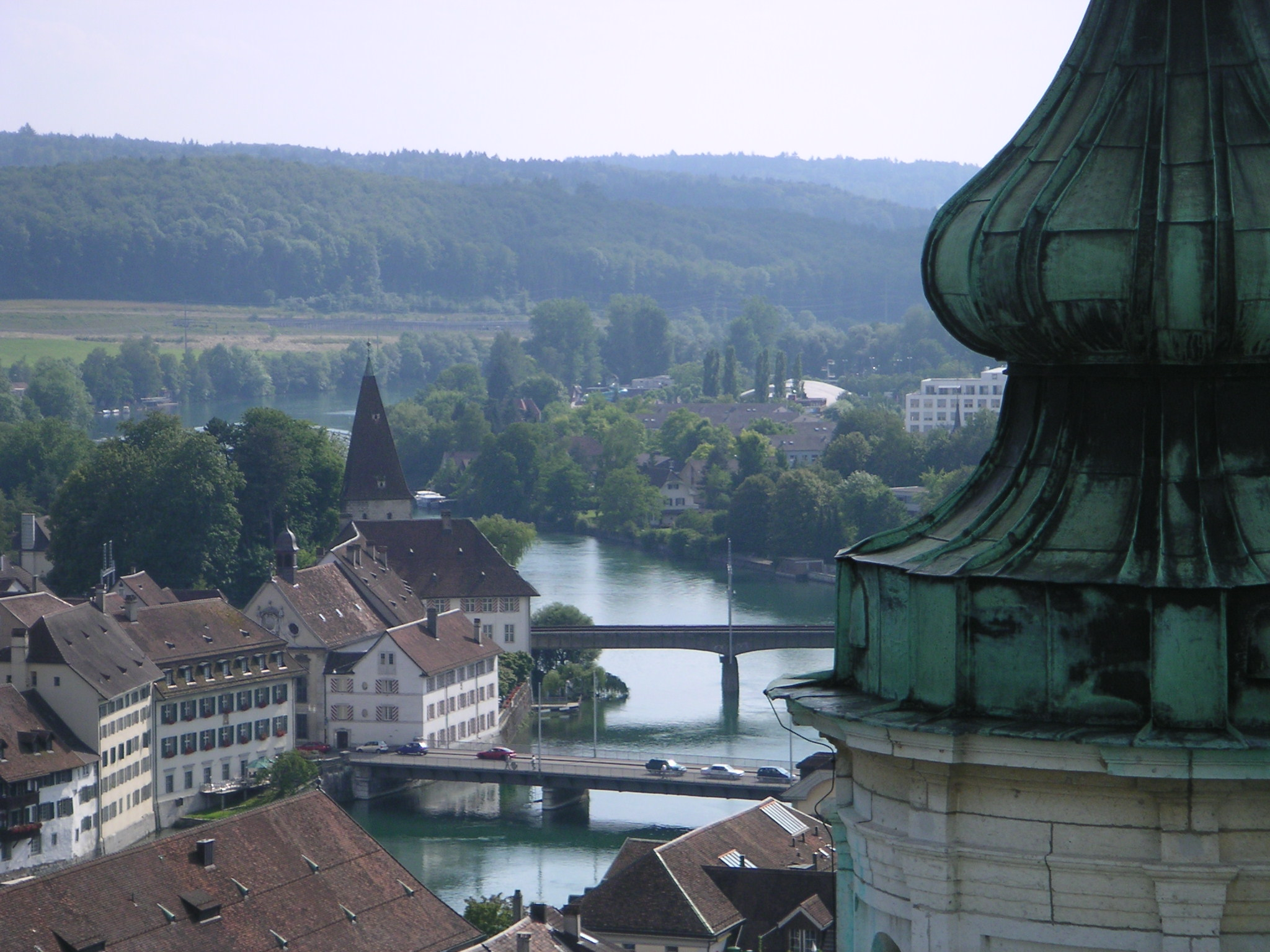
The Aare as seen from the cathedral.

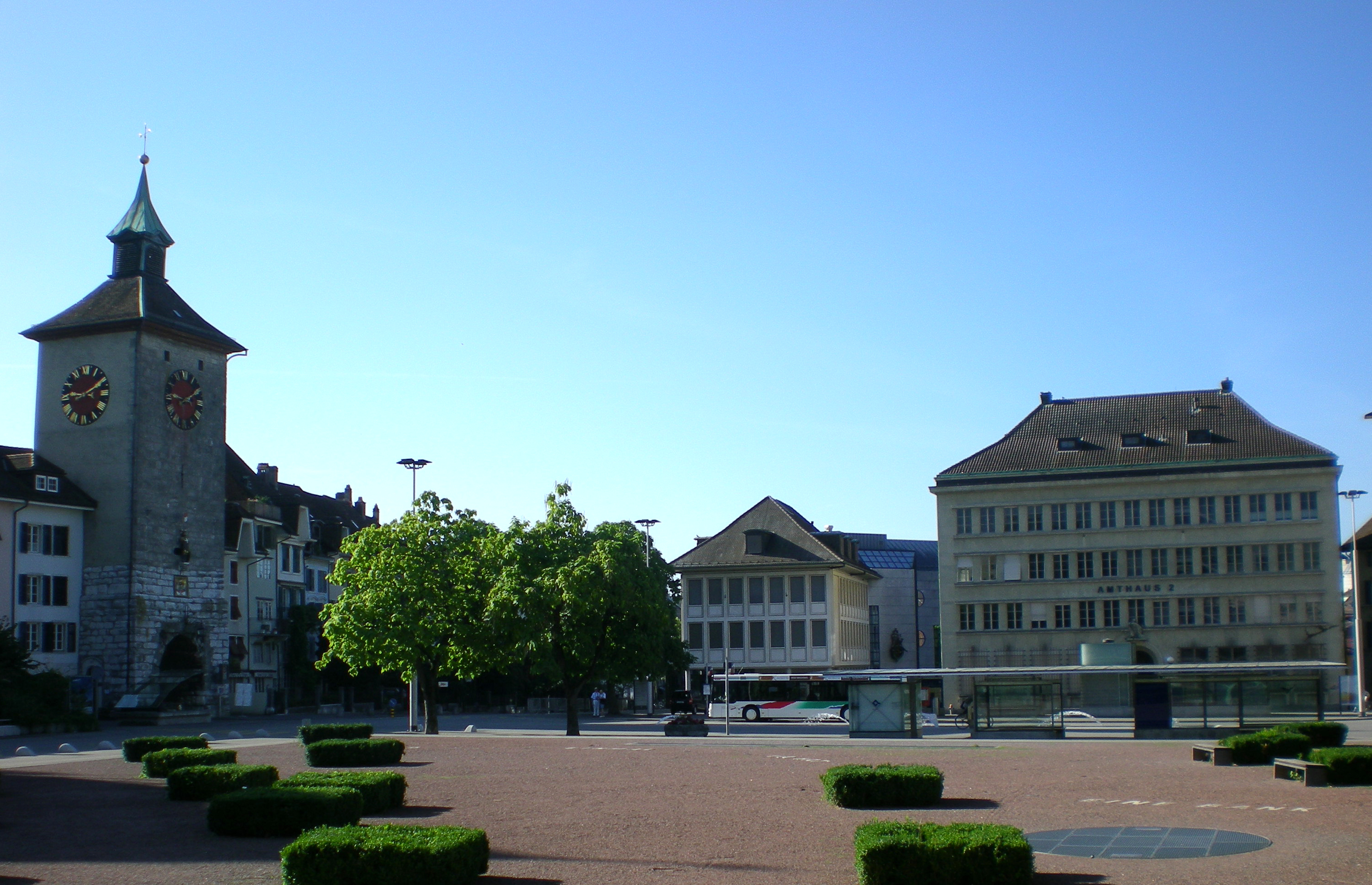
Amthausplatz

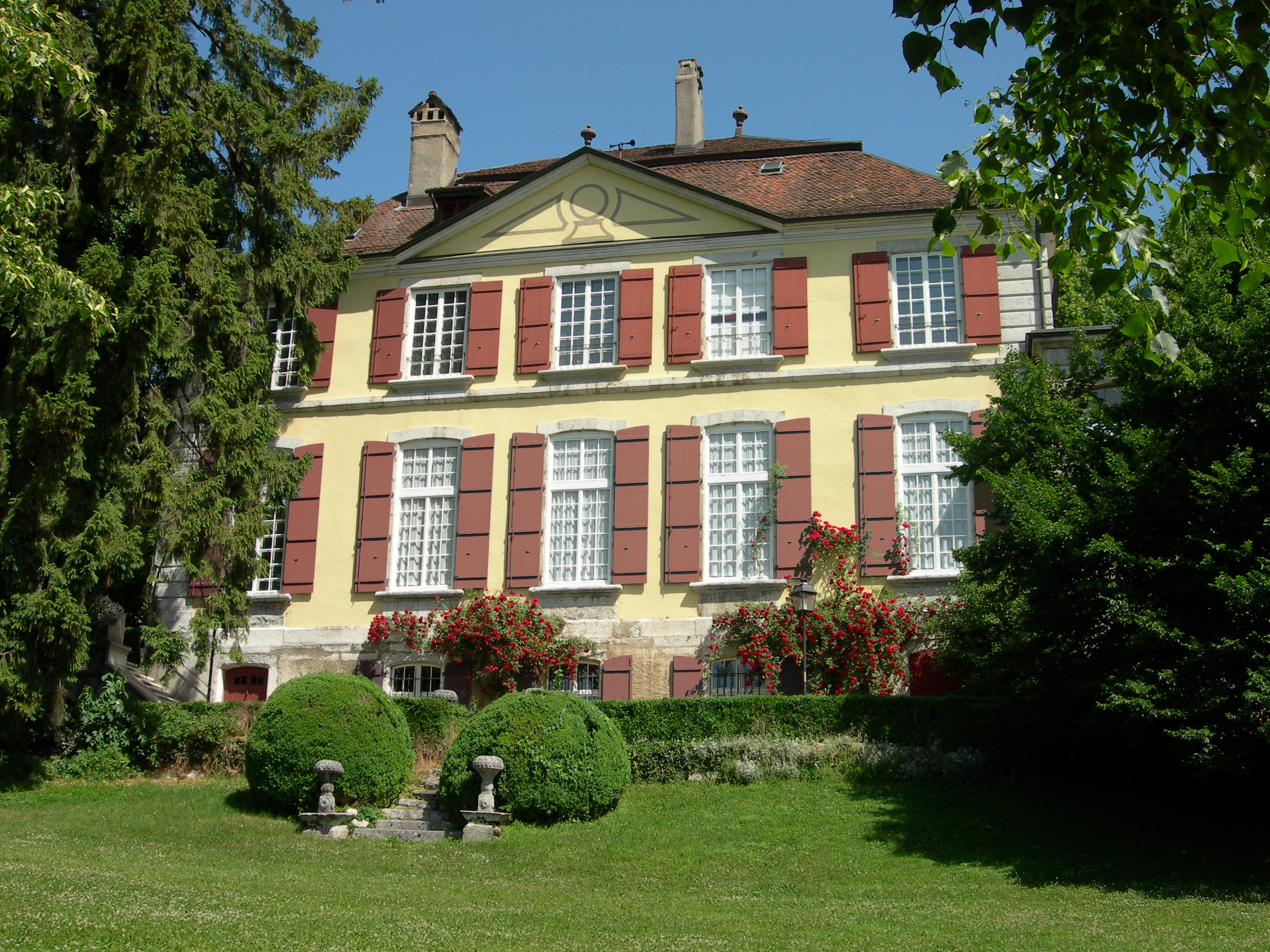
Historical Museum of Solothurn

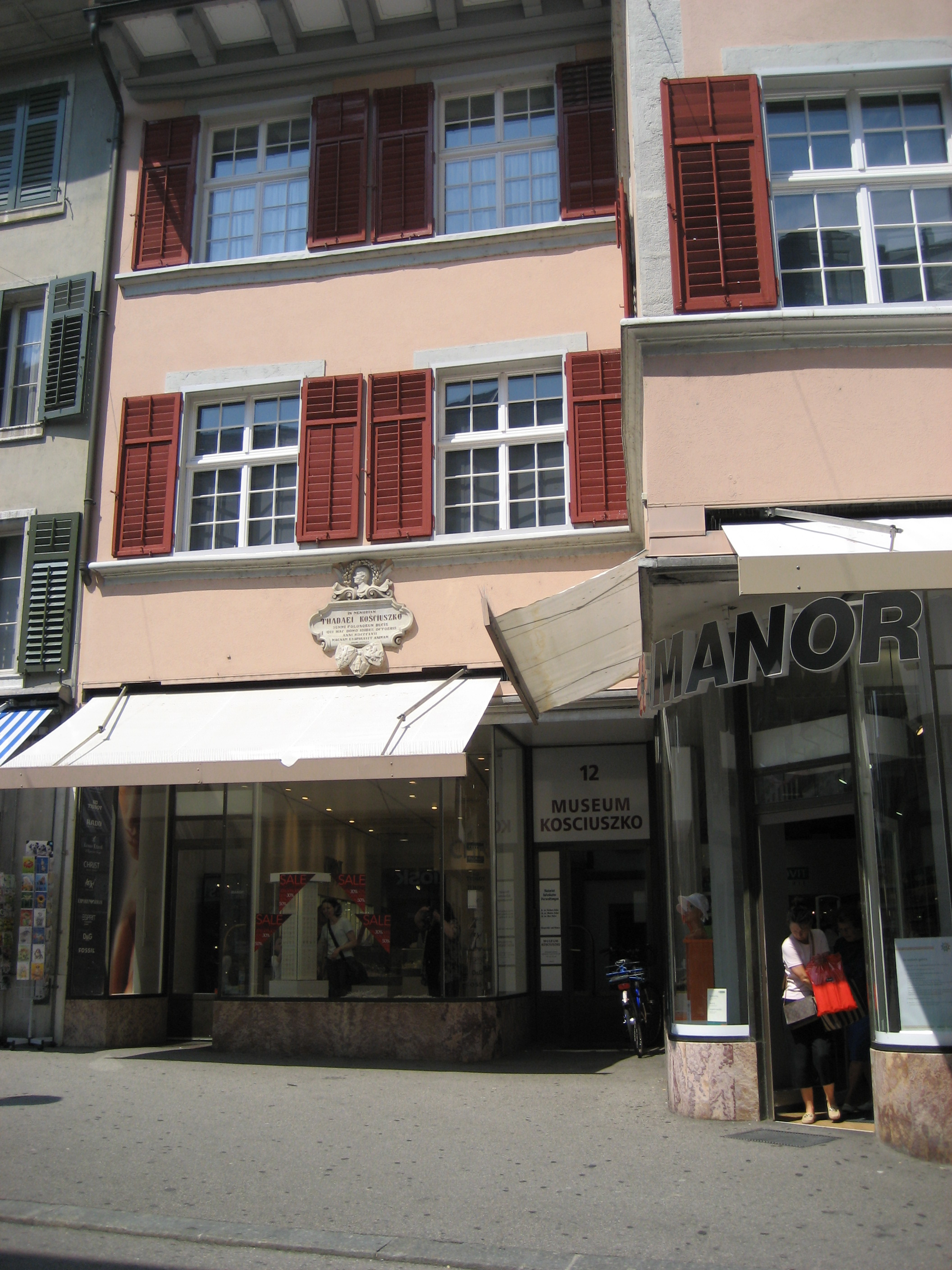
House in Solothurn where Tadeusz Kościuszko was living at the time of his death in October 1817.

== Politics ==
In the 2007 federal election the most popular party was the SP which received 24.09% of the vote. The next three most popular parties were the FDP (23.53%), the Green Party (18.56%) and the CVP (17.19%). In the federal election, a total of 5,767 votes were cast, and the voter turnout was 53.8%.

== Economy ==
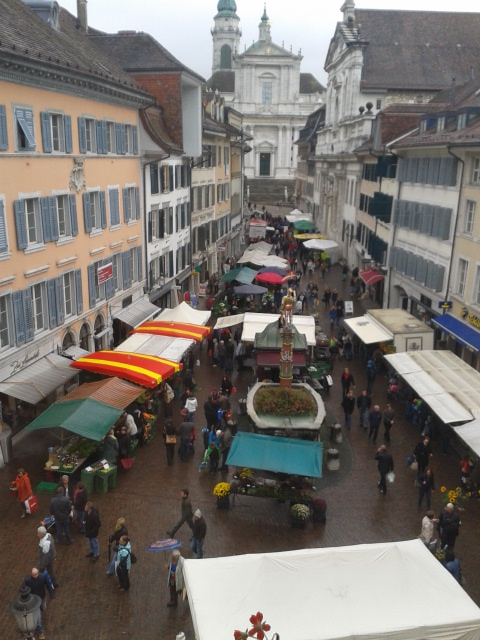
The market (as of 2015) in Solothurn.

As of 2010, Solothurn had an unemployment rate of 4.6%. As of 2008, there were 22 people employed in the primary economic sector and about 4 businesses involved in this sector. 2,587 people were employed in the secondary sector and there were 178 businesses in this sector. 14,381 people were employed in the tertiary sector, with 1,226 businesses in this sector. There were 8,023 residents of the municipality who were employed in some capacity, of which women made up 46.9% of the workforce.

In 2008 the total number of full-time equivalent jobs was 13,378. The number of jobs in the primary sector was 16, of which 7 were in agriculture and 9 were in forestry or lumber production. The number of jobs in the secondary sector was 2,430 of which 1,398 or (57.5%) were in manufacturing and 813 (33.5%) were in construction. The number of jobs in the tertiary sector was 10,932. In the tertiary sector; 1,537 or 14.1% were in wholesale or retail sales or the repair of motor vehicles, 454 or 4.2% were in the movement and storage of goods, 610 or 5.6% were in a hotel or restaurant, 583 or 5.3% were in the information industry, 975 or 8.9% were the insurance or financial industry, 1,095 or 10.0% were technical professionals or scientists, 614 or 5.6% were in education and 2,612 or 23.9% were in health care.

In 2000, there were 13,529 workers who commuted into the municipality and 3,598 workers who commuted away. The municipality is a net importer of workers, with about 3.8 workers entering the municipality for every one leaving. Of the working population, 20.1% used public transportation to get to work, and 40.3% used a private car.

== Transport ==
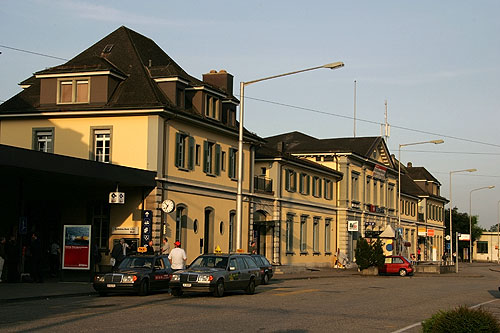
Solothurn's main railway station

Solothurn railway station is the main railway station and located south of the old town on the opposite side of the Aare river. It is served by long- and medium-distance trains (IC, RE) as well as local S-Bahn trains (e.g. Bern S-Bahn). Services are operated by Swiss Federal Railways, BLS, RBS and Aare Seeland mobil (asm). Two other railway stations on the standard gauge Jura foot line are Solothurn Allmend and Solothurn West, which are both only served by S-Bahn trains. The asm operates over the meter gauge Solothurn–Niederbipp railway line, with two additional stations within Solothurn (Solothurn Baseltor, Solothurn Sternen) and another one (St. Katharinen) located on the municipal boundary.

The A5 motorway runs south of Solothurn.

== Religion ==
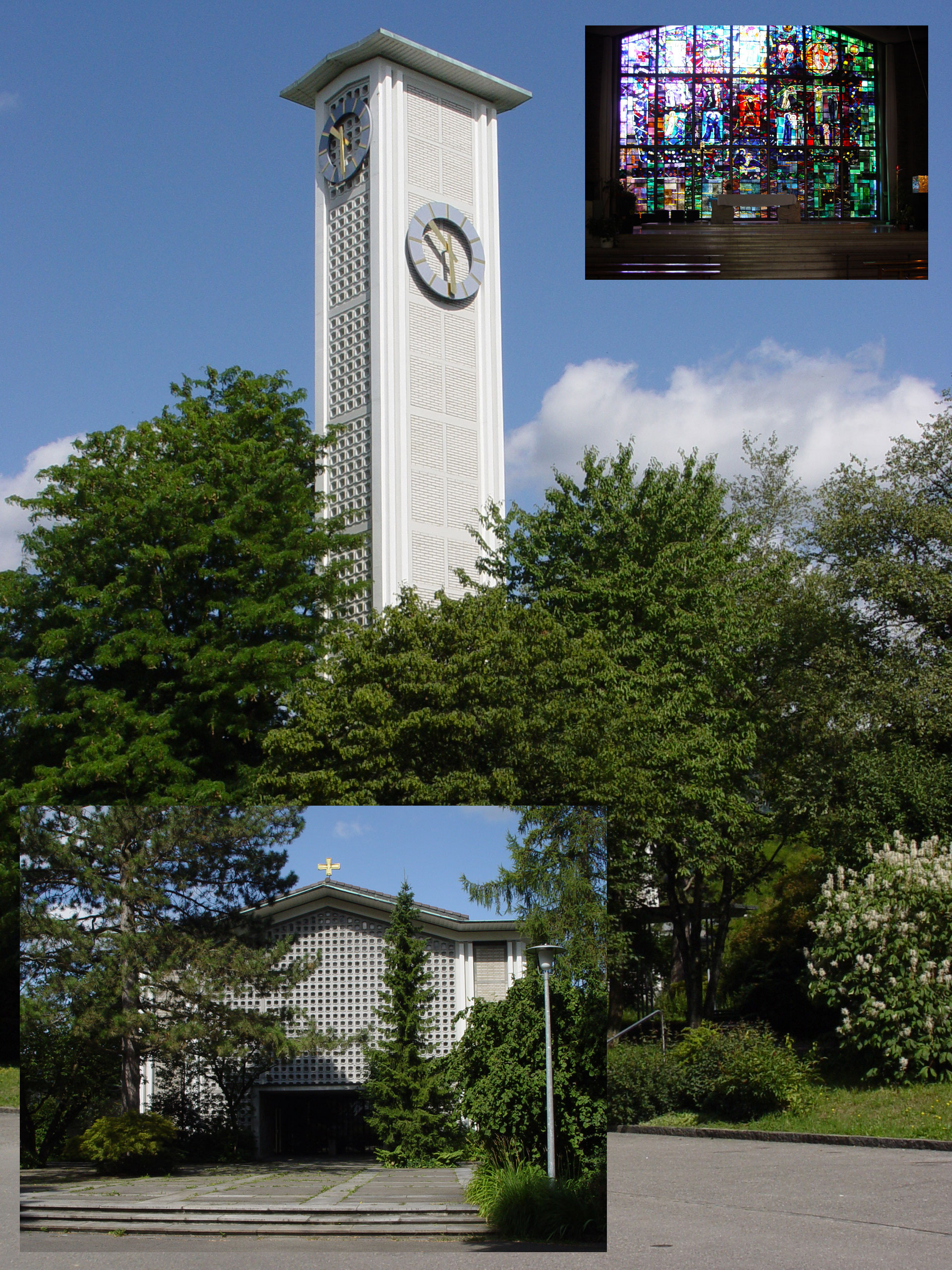
Church of St. Marien in the west of Solothurn

From the 2000 census, 5,463 or 35.3% were Roman Catholic, while 4,358 or 28.1% belonged to the Swiss Reformed Church. Of the rest of the population, there were 278 members of an Orthodox church (or about 1.79% of the population), there were 182 individuals (or about 1.18% of the population) who belonged to the Christian Catholic Church, and there were 248 individuals (or about 1.60% of the population) who belonged to another Christian church. There were 27 individuals (or about 0.17% of the population) who were Jewish, and 915 (or about 5.91% of the population) who were Islamic. There were 78 individuals who were Buddhist, 173 individuals who were Hindu and 27 individuals who belonged to another church. 3,139 (or about 20.27% of the population) belonged to no church, are agnostic or atheist, and 601 individuals (or about 3.88% of the population) did not answer the question.

== Education ==
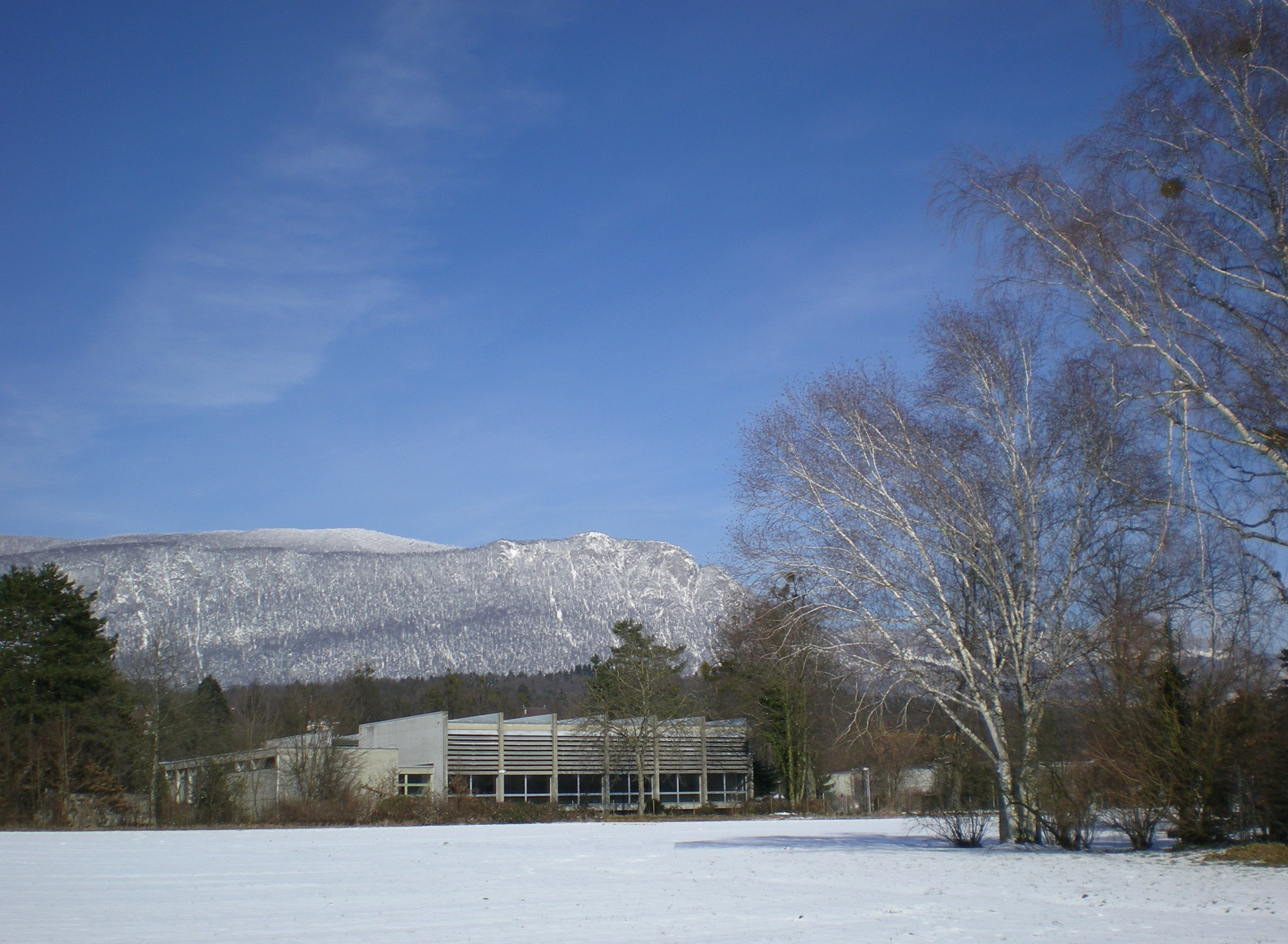
The Cantonal School (Gymnasium) in Solothurn

In Solothurn about 5,724 or (37.0%) of the population have completed non-mandatory upper secondary education, and 2,815 or (18.2%) have completed additional higher education (either university or a Fachhochschule). Of the 2,815 who completed tertiary schooling, 58.0% were Swiss men, 28.0% were Swiss women, 8.1% were non-Swiss men and 5.9% were non-Swiss women.

During the 2010–2011 school year there were a total of students in the Solothurn school system. The education system in the Canton of Solothurn allows young children to attend two years of non-obligatory Kindergarten. During that school year, there were Schülerbestand children in kindergarten. The canton's school system requires students to attend six years of primary school, with some of the children attending smaller, specialized classes. In the municipality there were 2010–2011 students in primary school. The secondary school program consists of three lower, obligatory years of schooling, followed by three to five years of optional, advanced schools. All the lower secondary students from Solothurn attend their school in a neighboring municipality. As of 2000, there were 2,517 students in Solothurn who came from another municipality, while 188 residents attended schools outside the municipality.

Solothurn is home to two libraries. These libraries include the Zentralbibliothek Solothurn and the Fachhochschule Nordwestschweiz, Pädagogische Hochschule, Standort Solothurn (a library of the Fachhochschule Nordwestschweiz). There was a combined total (as of 2008) of 1,195,394 books or other media in the libraries, and in the same year a total of 522,650 items were loaned out.

== Sport ==
FC Solothurn is the town's football club.

== The number 11 ==
Solothurn has a special affinity for the number eleven.

The Canton of Solothurn was the eleventh to become part of the Swiss Confederation. There are eleven churches and chapels, as well as eleven historical fountains and eleven towers. The St. Ursus cathedral has eleven altars and eleven bells, and the stairs in front of the cathedral have landings after every eleven steps.

A local brewery has named itself Öufi, which is Swiss German for eleven, and produces a beer with the same name.

== International relations ==
=== Twin towns—Sister cities ===
Solothurn is twinned with:

- Heilbronn, Germany, since 1981
- Le Landeron, Switzerland, since 2003

=== Partnerships ===
- Kraków in Poland, since 1990

== Notable people ==
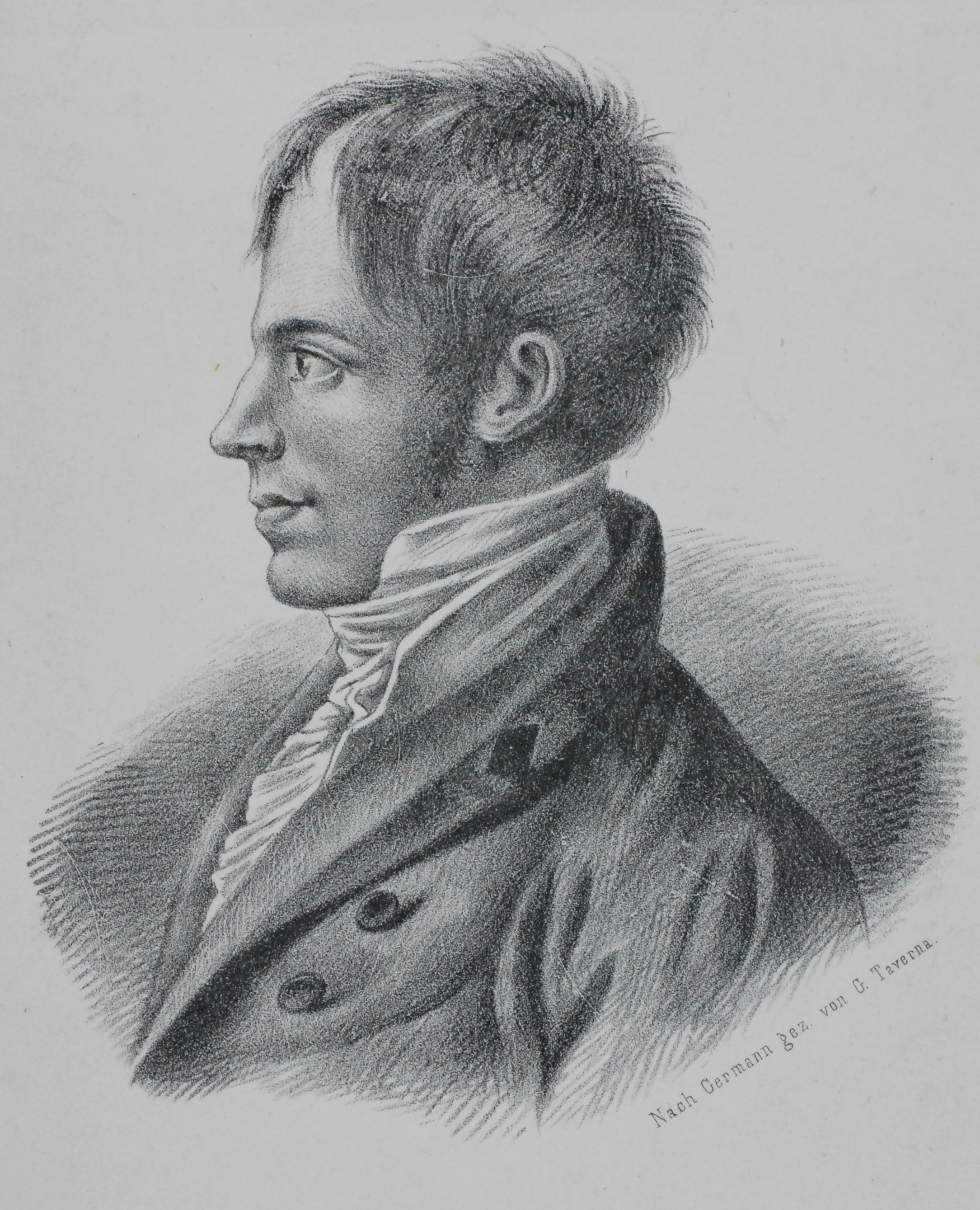
Robert Glutz, 1855

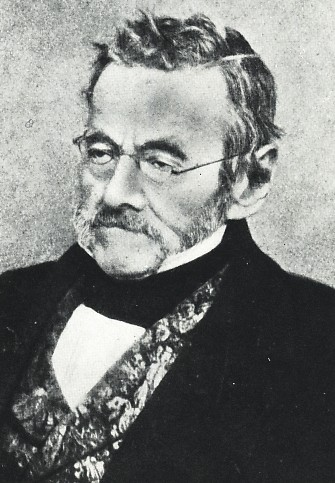
Charles Sealsfield, 1864

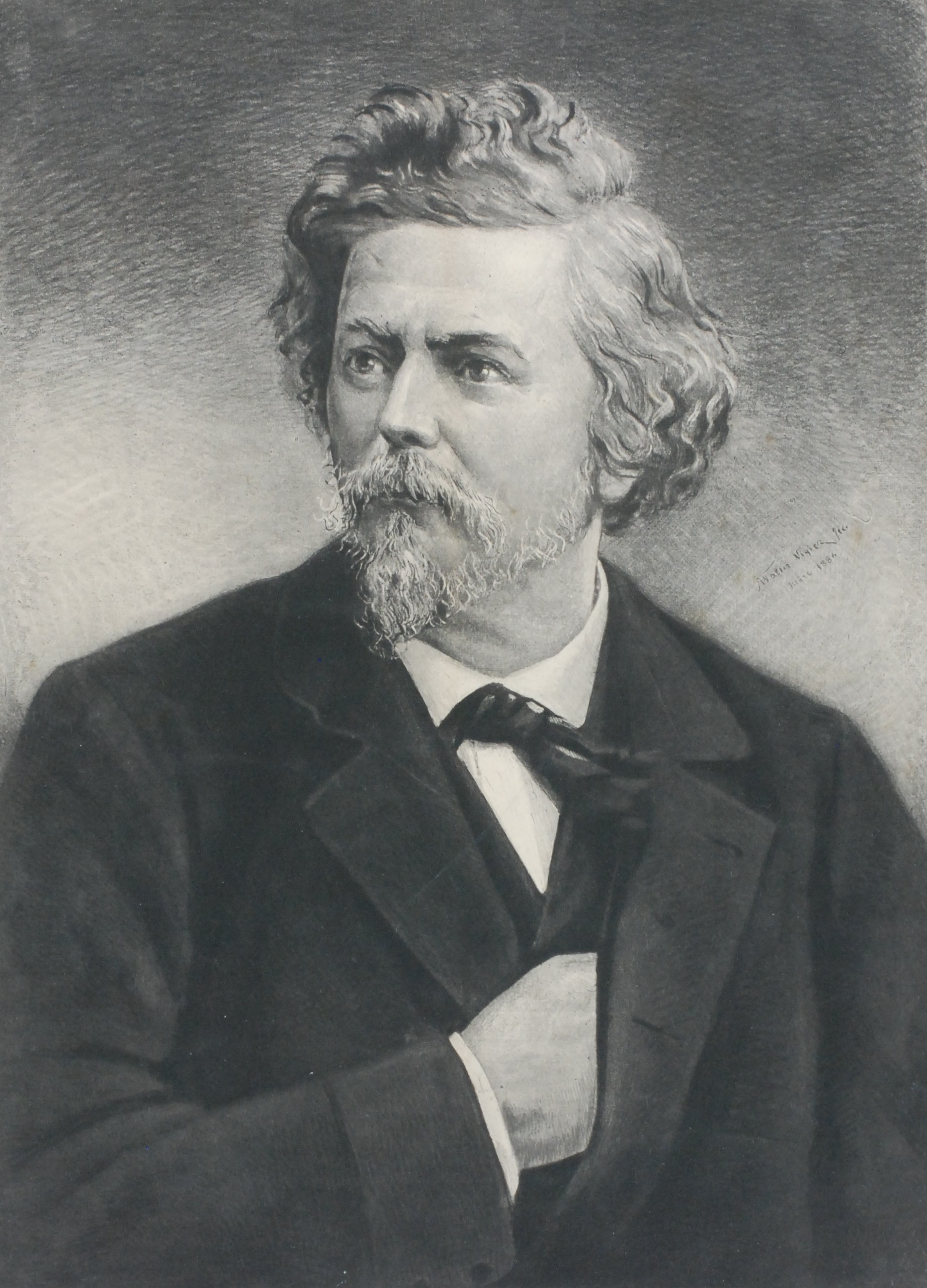
Wilhelm Vigier, 1886

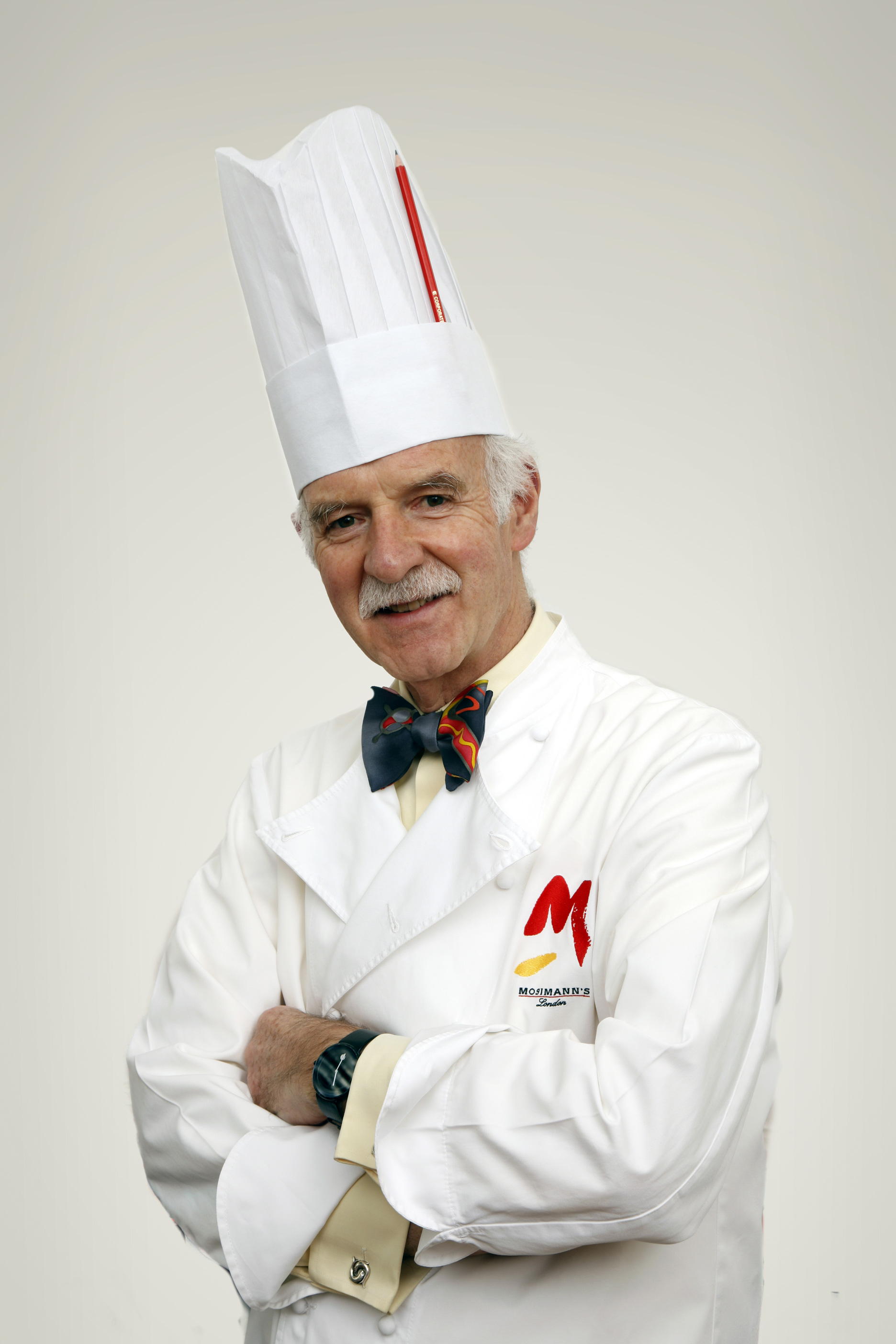
Chef Anton Mosimann, 2010

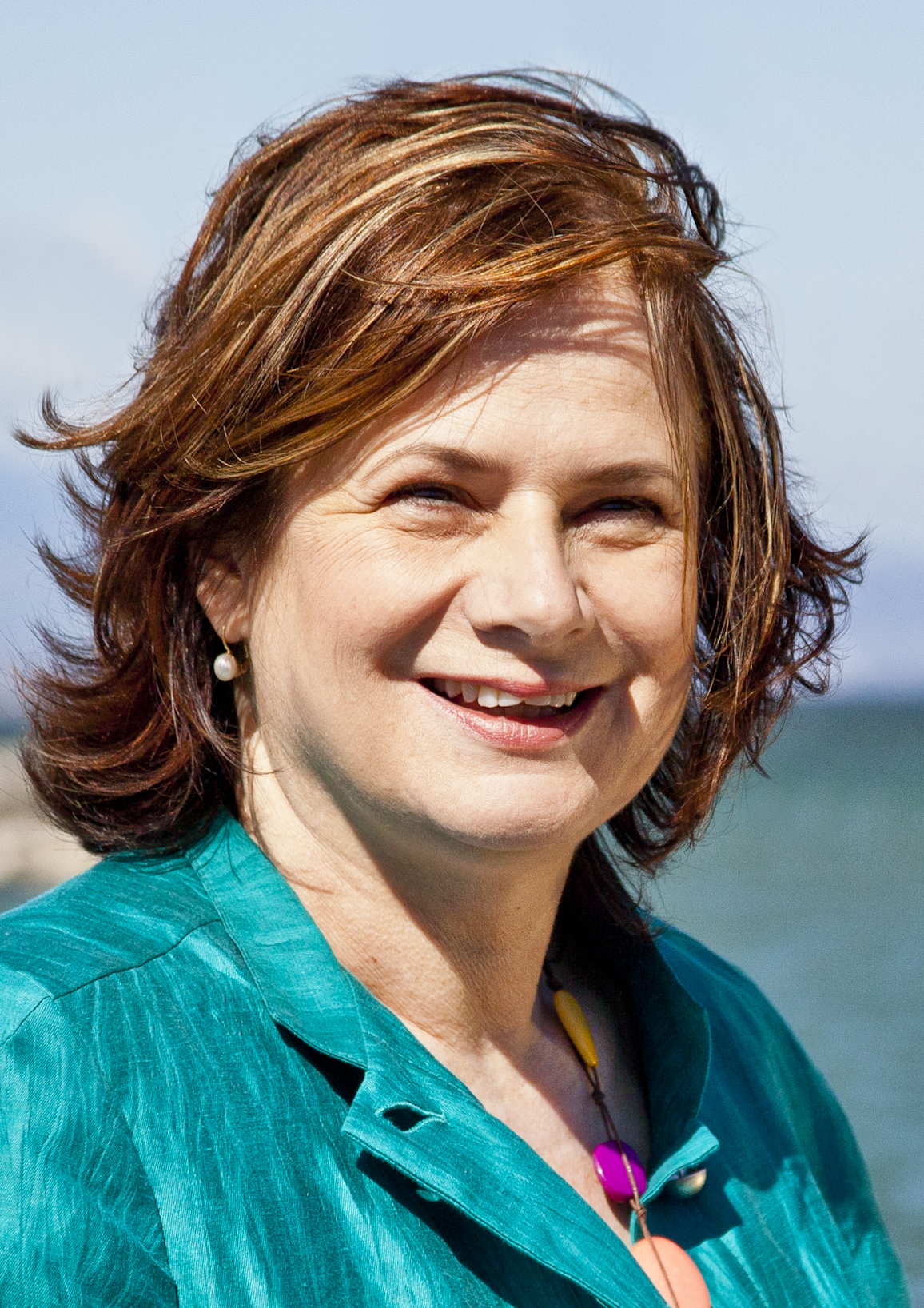
Esther Alder, 2014

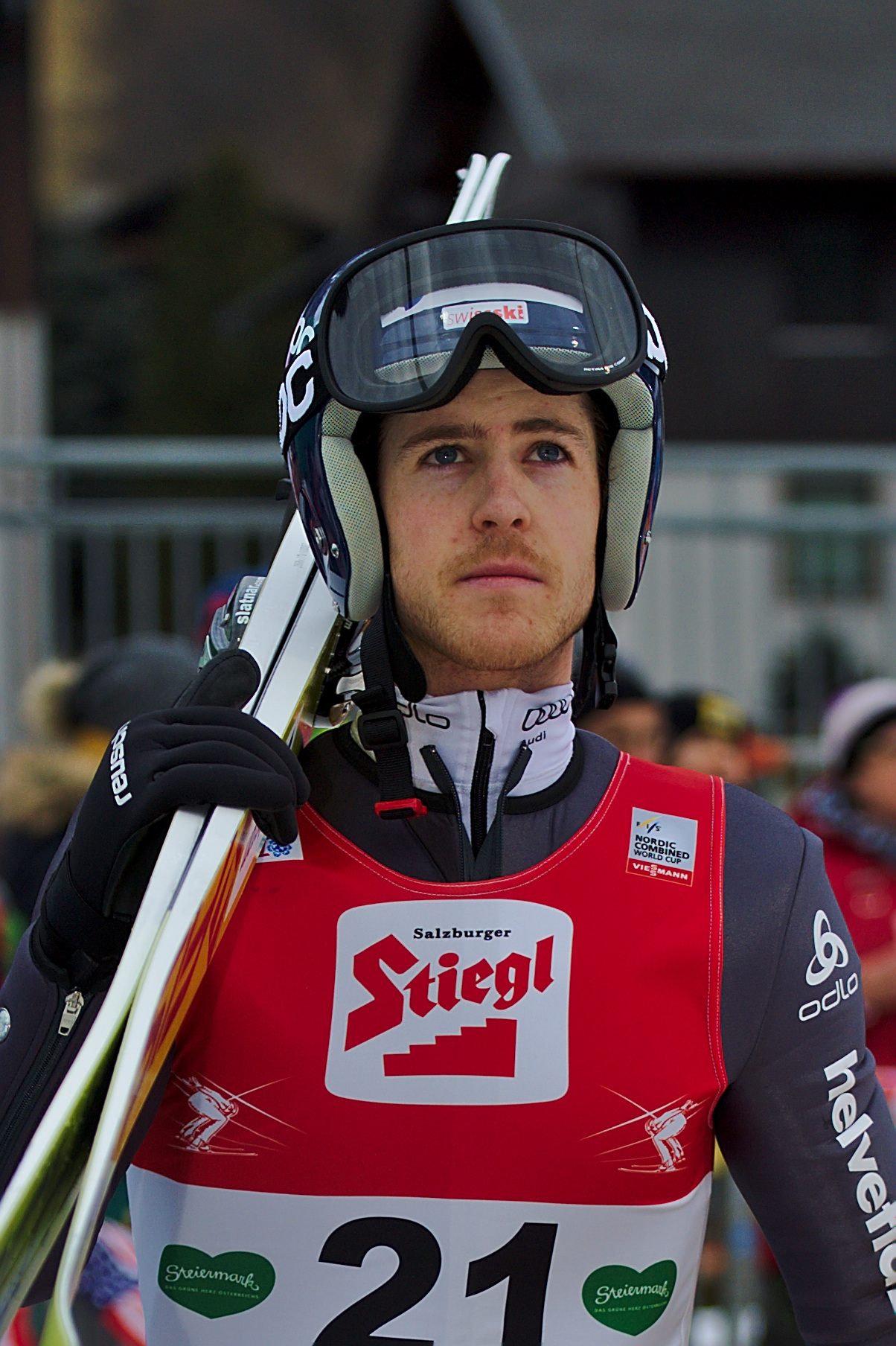
Tim Hug, 2016

=== Early times ===
- Ursus of Solothurn († c. 303), saint and patron of the Roman Catholic cathedral in Solothurn, where his body is located
- Urs Graf der Ältere (1485–1528), Renaissance goldsmith, painter, printmaker and mercenary
- Gregorius Sickinger (1558–1631), painter, draughtsman and engraver
- Georg Gotthart (1552–1619), poet and playwright

=== 17th century ===
- Jean II d'Estrées (1624–1707), Marshal of France and a naval commander of Louis XIV
- Johann Rudolf Byss (1660–1738), painter of the Netherlandish and Italian classic styles
- Franz Adam Karrer (1672–1741), senior Swiss military officer in French service

=== 18th century ===
- Franz Josef von Hallwyl (1719–1785), senior Swiss military officer in French service
- Peter Viktor, Baron von Besenval von Brunstatt (1721–1791), Swiss military officer in French service and favorite of Queen Marie Antoinette
- General Tadeusz Kościuszko (1746–1817), Polish statesman and American military leader, lived in exile in Solothurn
- Urs Glutz von Blotzheim (1751–1816), military officer and politician
- Victor von Gibelin (1771–1853), Swiss military officer in French service and politician
- Robert Glutz-Blotzheim (1786–1818), writer, librarian and historian
- Konrad Josef Glutz von Blotzheim (1789–1857), priest
- Charles Sealsfield (1793–1864), Austrian-American writer, journalist and advocate for a German democracy

=== 19th century ===
- Johann Friedrich Dietler (1804–1874), portrait painter
- Franz Krutter (1807–1873), writer, lawyer and politician
- Franz Pfeiffer (1815–1868), literary scholar who worked in Germany and Austria
- Wilhelm Vigier (1823–1886), politician, President of the Swiss Council of States 1862–1863 and 1882–1883
- Frank Buchser (1828–1890), painter of notable post–Civil War American figures
- Otto Frölicher (1840–1890), landscape painter
- Conradin Zschokke (1842–1918), engineer
- Victor Sterki (1846–1933), Swiss malacologist who lived in Ohio, USA
- Cuno Amiet (1868–1961), painter, illustrator, graphic artist and sculptor

=== 20th century ===
- Ruedi Walter (1916–1990), comedian, radio personality and stage and film actor
- Oscar Wiggli (1927–2016), composer and sculptor
- Herbert Meier (1928–2018), writer and translator
- Otto F. Walter (1928–1994), publisher and author
- Urs Jaeggi (born 1931), sociologist, painter and author
- Urs Noel Glutz von Blotzheim (born 1932), zoologist, known for his ornithological work
- Schang Hutter (1934–2021), sculptor
- Peter Bichsel (born 1935), writer and journalist, representing modern German literature
- Walter Bloch (born 1943), philosopher and writer
- Walter Schenker (1943–2018), author
- Anton Mosimann OBE, DL (born 1947), chef and restaurateur
- Markus Gygax (born 1950), former commander of the Swiss Air Force
- Chris von Rohr (born 1951), rock musician, record producer, founder of hard rock band Krokus
- Kurt Fluri (born 1955), politician, member of the National Council of Switzerland
- Esther Alder (born 1958), politician, in 2015 became the Mayor of Geneva
- Denise Wyss (born 1965), first woman to be ordained in the Old Catholic Church
- Bernhard Hess (born 1966), politician, member of the National Council 1999–2007
- Tom Misteli (born 1966), cell biologist and pioneer in the field of genome cell biology
- Martin vom Brocke (born 1969), dentist, orthodontist and author
- Adèle Thorens Goumaz (born 1971), politician, member of the National Council since 2007
- Martin Oeggerli (born 1974), photographer specializing in scientific microscopy and fine art
- Krokus (founded 1975 by Chris von Rohr), hard rock and heavy metal band
- Andreas Reize (born 19 May 1975), organist and conductor, Thomaskantor

=== Sport ===
- Edgar Buchwalder (1916–2009), cyclist, silver medalist at the 1936 Summer Olympics
- Anton Allemann (1936–2008), footballer, played 27 times for the Swiss national team
- Alex Tschui (born 1939), modern pentathlete, competed at the 1968 Summer Olympics
- Alexander Frei (born 1954), racing driver
- Marco Walker (born 1970), former footballer who played 344 games
- Alexander Popov (born 1971), Russian former swimmer, won gold in the 50m. and 100m. freestyle at the 1992 and 1996 Summer Olympics, lives in Solothurn
- Benjamin Leuenberger (born 1982), racing driver
- Tim Hug (born 1987), Nordic combined skier, competed in the 2010 Winter Olympics
- Yannick Schwaller (born 1995), curler, 2023 World Men's Curling Championship bronze medalist, 2014 World Junior Men's Curling Champion

== Climate ==
Climate data for Solothurn/Koppigen, elevation 485 m (1,591 ft), (1991–2020)
Month	Jan	Feb	Mar	Apr	May	Jun	Jul	Aug	Sep	Oct	Nov	Dec	Year
Mean daily maximum °C (°F)	3.1 (37.6)	5.2 (41.4)	10.5 (50.9)	14.9 (58.8)	18.9 (66.0)	22.9 (73.2)	25.1 (77.2)	24.6 (76.3)	19.7 (67.5)	14.1 (57.4)	7.5 (45.5)	3.5 (38.3)	14.2 (57.6)
Daily mean °C (°F)	0.4 (32.7)	1.1 (34.0)	5.2 (41.4)	8.9 (48.0)	13.2 (55.8)	16.8 (62.2)	18.7 (65.7)	18.4 (65.1)	14.0 (57.2)	9.5 (49.1)	4.3 (39.7)	1.0 (33.8)	9.3 (48.7)
Mean daily minimum °C (°F)	−2.7 (27.1)	−2.8 (27.0)	0.3 (32.5)	3.1 (37.6)	7.5 (45.5)	11.1 (52.0)	12.8 (55.0)	12.7 (54.9)	9.2 (48.6)	5.6 (42.1)	1.2 (34.2)	−1.8 (28.8)	4.7 (40.5)
Average precipitation mm (inches)	65.1 (2.56)	56.9 (2.24)	62.8 (2.47)	75.5 (2.97)	105.3 (4.15)	106.6 (4.20)	107.3 (4.22)	114.7 (4.52)	84.8 (3.34)	85.5 (3.37)	76.7 (3.02)	84.8 (3.34)	1,026 (40.39)
Average snowfall cm (inches)	11.4 (4.5)	11.6 (4.6)	5.1 (2.0)	1.8 (0.7)	0.0 (0.0)	0.0 (0.0)	0.0 (0.0)	0.0 (0.0)	0.0 (0.0)	0.6 (0.2)	5.0 (2.0)	13.5 (5.3)	49.0 (19.3)
Average precipitation days (≥ 1.0 mm)	10.1	9.3	9.5	9.5	11.9	11.4	10.8	11.2	9.1	10.3	10.6	11.4	125.1
Average snowy days (≥ 1.0 cm)	3.6	3.3	1.7	0.6	0.0	0.0	0.0	0.0	0.0	0.1	1.2	3.3	13.8
Average relative humidity (%)	86	81	75	73	74	73	71	74	79	85	88	88	79
Source 1: NOAA
Source 2: MeteoSwiss

== See also ==
- Solothurner Literaturpreis
- Kościuszko Museum, Solothurn
