= Franz Anatol Wyss =

Swiss painter

Franz Anatol Wyss (born Fulenbach, May 1, 1940) is a Swiss painter.

Wyss trained in the School of Art and Design (Kunstgewerbeschule) in Lucerne between 1960 and 1961 and then the Art School of Zurich from 1965-66 with Bruno Stamm. In 1975 he published Franz Anatol Wyss, Zürich: Druckgraphik 1966-1975 with the Kunstmuseum Olten. Since 1985 his studio has been in Murgenthal. He was noted for his "oppressive inaglios". In addition to drawings and engravings, since 1985 he has produced large format acrylic paintings. Four of his drawings are in the collection of the Gottard Bank, a collection used for decoration in the Bank as well as for exhibitions in the Galleria Gottardo and intended to represent the work of leading post-war contemporary Swiss artists.

In 1992, he showcased his work in Berlin. In 1997 he extensively visited Italy and in 1999 studied in France.

== Personal life ==
Wyss married Edith Humbel in 1970. The couple had 3 children: Katja (born 1970), Roman (born 1973), Marcel (born 1976). Rosina was born in 1978 but died three months after birth.
