= List of cultural property of national significance in Switzerland: Solothurn =

This list contains all cultural property of national significance (class A) in the canton of Solothurn from the 2009 Swiss Inventory of Cultural Property of National and Regional Significance. It is sorted by municipality and contains 35 individual buildings, 9 collections and 17 archaeological finds.

The geographic coordinates provided are in the Swiss coordinate system as given in the Inventory.

== Aeschi ==
KGS No.^{?}	Picture	Name	Street Address	CH1903 X coordinate	CH1903 Y coordinate	Location
4486		Burgäschisee; Prehistoric Lake Shore Settlement		617.700	224.250	47.168973°N 7.672092°E

== Balm bei Günsberg ==
KGS No.^{?}	Picture	Name	Street Address	CH1903 X coordinate	CH1903 Y coordinate	Location
4492	Ruins of Balmfluh Castle	Ruins of Balmfluh Castle		608.820	233.850	47.2555°N 7.555157°E

== Balsthal ==
KGS No.^{?}	Picture	Name	Street Address	CH1903 X coordinate	CH1903 Y coordinate	Location
4497	Ruins of Neu-Falkenstein Castle	Ruins of Neu-Falkenstein Castle		620.540	241.371	47.322887°N 7.710332°E
Unknown		ISOS Kleinstadt / Flecken: Balsthal				
Unknown		ISOS Spezialfall: Fabrikanlage Innere Klus				

== Beinwil ==
KGS No.^{?}	Picture	Name	Street Address	CH1903 X coordinate	CH1903 Y coordinate	Location
4506	Former Benedictine Beinwil Abbey	Former Benedictine Beinwil Abbey	Kloster 116	611.215	245.708	47.36212°N 7.587093°E
Unknown		ISOS Spezialfall: Monastery Beinwil				

== Bolken ==
KGS No.^{?}	Picture	Name	Street Address	CH1903 X coordinate	CH1903 Y coordinate	Location
9666		Inkwilersee, Paleolithic Settlement / Neolithic and Bronze Age Lake Shore Settlement		616.949	227.499	47.198217°N 7.662309°E

== Buchegg ==
KGS No.^{?}	Picture	Name	Street Address	CH1903 X coordinate	CH1903 Y coordinate	Location
Unknown		ISOS Dorf: Aetingen				
Unknown		ISOS Dorf: Gossliwil				
Unknown		ISOS Dorf: Hessigkofen				
Unknown		ISOS Dorf: Mühledorf (SO)				
Unknown		ISOS Dorf: Tscheppach				

== Büren ==
KGS No.^{?}	Picture	Name	Street Address	CH1903 X coordinate	CH1903 Y coordinate	Location
Unknown		(SO) ISOS Dorf: Büren				

== Dornach ==
KGS No.^{?}	Picture	Name	Street Address	CH1903 X coordinate	CH1903 Y coordinate	Location
4527	Goetheanum with Surrounding Buildings	Goetheanum with Surrounding Buildings	Hügelweg 45	613.695	259.492	47.486048°N 7.620344°E
10167	De Jaager House	De Jaager House	Rüttiweg 20	613.681	259.346	47.484735°N 7.620154°E
10168	Duldeck House	Duldeck House	Rüttiweg 15	613.572	259.462	47.485781°N 7.618711°E
4526	Ruins of Dorneck Castle	Ruins of Dorneck Castle		614.280	258.820	47.479992°N 7.628084°E
Unknown		ISOS Spezialfall: Goetheanum				

== Eppenberg-Wöschnau ==
KGS No.^{?}	Picture	Name	Street Address	CH1903 X coordinate	CH1903 Y coordinate	Location
4536		Buechholz, Iron Age Hilltop Settlement		644.300	247.900	47.380442°N 8.025256°E

== Erlinsbach ==
KGS No.^{?}	Picture	Name	Street Address	CH1903 X coordinate	CH1903 Y coordinate	Location
Unknown		ISOS Dorf: Niedererlinsbach				

== Feldbrunnen-St. Niklaus ==
KGS No.^{?}	Picture	Name	Street Address	CH1903 X coordinate	CH1903 Y coordinate	Location
4539	Waldegg Castle	Waldegg Castle	Waldegg 1–4	608.315	230.278	47.223378°N 7.54842°E
Unknown		ISOS ISOS Spezialfall: Waldegg / Feldbrunnnen-St.Niklaus				

== Flumenthal ==
KGS No.^{?}	Picture	Name	Street Address	CH1903 X coordinate	CH1903 Y coordinate	Location
10170	Parish Church of St. Peter and Paul	Parish Church of St. Peter and Paul	Kirchgasse 31	612.073	231.672	47.235859°N 7.598074°E

== Grenchen ==
KGS No.^{?}	Picture	Name	Street Address	CH1903 X coordinate	CH1903 Y coordinate	Location
Unknown		ISOS Verstädtertes Dorf: Grenchen				

== Himmelried ==
KGS No.^{?}	Picture	Name	Street Address	CH1903 X coordinate	CH1903 Y coordinate	Location
4563	Kastelhöhle, Paleolithic Cave	Kastelhöhle, Paleolithic Cave		609.850	253.000	47.427728°N 7.569185°E

== Hochwald ==
KGS No.^{?}	Picture	Name	Street Address	CH1903 X coordinate	CH1903 Y coordinate	Location
Unknown		ISOS Dorf: Hochwald				

== Holderbank ==
KGS No.^{?}	Picture	Name	Street Address	CH1903 X coordinate	CH1903 Y coordinate	Location
4569	Ruins of Alt-Bechburg Castle	Ruins of Alt-Bechburg Castle		625.170	242.450	47.332432°N 7.771635°E

== Laupersdorf ==
KGS No.^{?}	Picture	Name	Street Address	CH1903 X coordinate	CH1903 Y coordinate	Location
Unknown		ISOS Weiler: Höngen				

== Lüsslingen-Nennigkofen ==
KGS No.^{?}	Picture	Name	Street Address	CH1903 X coordinate	CH1903 Y coordinate	Location
Unknown		ISOS Dorf: Lüsslingen				
Unknown		ISOS Dorf: Nennigkofen				

== Meltingen ==
KGS No.^{?}	Picture	Name	Street Address	CH1903 X coordinate	CH1903 Y coordinate	Location
Unknown		ISOS Dorf: Meltingen				

== Messen ==
KGS No.^{?}	Picture	Name	Street Address	CH1903 X coordinate	CH1903 Y coordinate	Location
Unknown		ISOS Dorf: Balm bei Messen				
Unknown		ISOS Dorf: Messen				

== Metzerlen-Mariastein ==
KGS No.^{?}	Picture	Name	Street Address	CH1903 X coordinate	CH1903 Y coordinate	Location
9307/extendedHtmlPopup 4603, 9307	Benedictine Mariastein Abbey with Library	Benedictine Mariastein Abbey with Library	Klosterplatz 1–4	604.021	258.397	47.47633°N 7.491979°E
Unknown		ISOS Dorf: Metzerlen				
Unknown		ISOS Spezialfall: Mariastein				

== Neuendorf ==
KGS No.^{?}	Picture	Name	Street Address	CH1903 X coordinate	CH1903 Y coordinate	Location
Unknown		ISOS Dorf: Neuendorf				

== Niederbuchsiten ==
KGS No.^{?}	Picture	Name	Street Address	CH1903 X coordinate	CH1903 Y coordinate	Location
Unknown		ISOS Dorf: Niederbuchsiten				

== Niedergösgen ==
KGS No.^{?}	Picture	Name	Street Address	CH1903 X coordinate	CH1903 Y coordinate	Location
10463	Church and Tower	Church and Tower	Schlossrainstrasse 9	641.772	247.033	47.372809°N 7.991701°E
Unknown		ISOS Verstädtertes Dorf: Schönenwerd				

== Oberbuchsiten ==
KGS No.^{?}	Picture	Name	Street Address	CH1903 X coordinate	CH1903 Y coordinate	Location
Unknown		ISOS Dorf: Oberbuchsiten				

== Oberdorf ==
KGS No.^{?}	Picture	Name	Street Address	CH1903 X coordinate	CH1903 Y coordinate	Location
4628		Parish and Pilgrimage Church	Kirchgasse 11	604.870	230.938	47.229349°N 7.502943°E
Unknown		ISOS Dorf: Oberdorf (SO)				

== Oensingen ==
KGS No.^{?}	Picture	Name	Street Address	CH1903 X coordinate	CH1903 Y coordinate	Location
9667		Lehnflue, Prehistoric and Roman era Hilltop Settlement, Medieval Castle		619.832	237.548	47.288523°N 7.700798°E
4637	Neu-Bechburg Castle	Neu-Bechburg Castle		621.130	238.370	47.295876°N 7.717995°E

== Olten ==
KGS No.^{?}	Picture	Name	Street Address	CH1903 X coordinate	CH1903 Y coordinate	Location
4639	Old City, Roman era Vicus, Medieval and Early Modern City	Old City, Roman era Vicus, Medieval and Early Modern City		635.140	244.440	47.349874°N 7.903692°E
4642	Train Station	Train Station	Bahnhofstrasse 22	635.436	244.679	47.352008°N 7.907628°E
4640		Dickenbännli, Prehistoric and Roman era Hilltop Settlement		634.625	245.070	47.355568°N 7.896925°E
4641	Covered Wooden Bridge over the Aare River	Covered Wooden Bridge over the Aare River	Hauptgasse/Bahnhofquai	635.250	244.400	47.349509°N 7.905144°E
8581		Naturmuseum	Kirchgasse 10	634.967	244.447	47.349946°N 7.901403°E
Unknown		ISOS Kleinstadt / Flecken: Olten				

== Rodersdorf ==
KGS No.^{?}	Picture	Name	Street Address	CH1903 X coordinate	CH1903 Y coordinate	Location
Unknown		ISOS Dorf: Rodersdorf				

== Rüttenen ==
KGS No.^{?}	Picture	Name	Street Address	CH1903 X coordinate	CH1903 Y coordinate	Location
4664	Hermitage and Pilgrimage Site	Hermitage and Pilgrimage Site	Einsiedelei 4	607.243	230.387	47.224371°N 7.534268°E
Unknown		ISOS Spezialfall: Hermitage				
Unknown		ISOS Spezialfall: Kreuzen				

== Schnottwil ==
KGS No.^{?}	Picture	Name	Street Address	CH1903 X coordinate	CH1903 Y coordinate	Location
Unknown		ISOS Dorf: Schnottwil				

== Schönenwerd ==
KGS No.^{?}	Picture	Name	Street Address	CH1903 X coordinate	CH1903 Y coordinate	Location
9288		Bally Areal		642.000	246.000	47.363504°N 7.994623°E
4669	Christian Catholic Collegiate church of St. Leodegar	Christian Catholic Collegiate church of St. Leodegar		642.723	246.930	47.371822°N 8.004282°E
9891		Granary im Ballypark	Parkstrasse	642.189	246.391	47.367008°N 7.997161°E
Unknown		ISOS Verstädtertes Dorf: Schönenwerd				

== Seewen ==
KGS No.^{?}	Picture	Name	Street Address	CH1903 X coordinate	CH1903 Y coordinate	Location
8574	Museum for Musikautomaten	Museum for Musikautomaten	Bollhübel 1	616.806	254.402	47.440196°N 7.661429°E
Unknown		ISOS Dorf: Seewen				

== Selzach ==
KGS No.^{?}	Picture	Name	Street Address	CH1903 X coordinate	CH1903 Y coordinate	Location
9668	Altreu, Medieval Ruined City	Altreu, Medieval Ruined City		600.940	226.600	47.190347°N 7.45104°E

== Solothurn ==
KGS No.^{?}	Picture	Name	Street Address	CH1903 X coordinate	CH1903 Y coordinate	Location
8619/extendedHtmlPopup 4685, 8619	Old Armory, Cantonal Museum	Old Armory, Cantonal Museum	Riedholzplatz 1	607.582	228.678	47.208995°N 7.538715°E
4680	Old City / Salodurum, Roman era Vicus, Medieval and Early Modern City	Old City / Salodurum, Roman era Vicus, Medieval and Early Modern City		607.450	228.550	47.207845°N 7.536971°E
4689	Former Blumenstein Castle	Former Blumenstein Castle	Blumensteinweg 12	607.438	229.505	47.216436°N 7.536828°E
4682	Visitation Convent	Visitation Convent	Grenchenstrasse 25–27	606.893	229.081	47.212628°N 7.529627°E
4683	Haller-Haus (Bishops Palace)	Haller-Haus (Bishops Palace)	Baselstrasse 61	608.108	229.141	47.213154°N 7.545666°E
4684	Jesuit Church with Kollegium (Lapidarium)	Jesuit Church with Kollegium (Lapidarium)	Hauptgasse 60	607.523	228.546	47.207809°N 7.537934°E
8549/extendedHtmlPopup 4686, 8549	Art Museum	Art Museum	Werkhofstrasse 30	607.488	228.830	47.210364°N 7.537477°E
4726	Mauritius Fountain	Mauritius Fountain	Zeughausplatz	607.596	228.622	47.208491°N 7.538899°E
8592	Naturmuseum	Naturmuseum	Klosterplatz 2	607.630	228.488	47.207286°N 7.539345°E
4687	Rathaus (Town council house)	Rathaus (Town council house)	Barfüssergasse 24	607.486	228.629	47.208556°N 7.537447°E
4734	Swiss Reformed Church	Swiss Reformed Church	Westringstrasse	607.293	228.716	47.20934°N 7.534901°E
4690	Steinbrugg Castle	Steinbrugg Castle	Baselstrasse 58	608.177	229.037	47.212217°N 7.546575°E
4691		Sommerhaus Vigier	Untere Steingrubenstrasse 21	607.228	229.057	47.212408°N 7.534049°E
4692	St. Ursen Cathedral	St. Ursen Cathedral	Hauptgasse 66	607.639	228.602	47.208311°N 7.539466°E
8794	State Archives	State Archives	Bielstrasse 41	606.828	228.791	47.21002°N 7.528764°E
10174	City Walls / Outworks	City Walls / Outworks		607.500	228.460	47.207035°N 7.537629°E
4693	Clock Tower	Clock Tower	Hauptgasse 44	607.445	228.521	47.207585°N 7.536904°E
9182/extendedHtmlPopup 9345, 9182	Central Library	Central Library	Bielstrasse 39	606.886	228.769	47.209821°N 7.52953°E
Unknown		ISOS Stadt: Solothurn				

== Subingen ==
KGS No.^{?}	Picture	Name	Street Address	CH1903 X coordinate	CH1903 Y coordinate	Location
4748		Erdbeereinschlag, Iron Age Graves		615.280	227.800	47.200965°N 7.640294°E

== Trimbach ==
KGS No.^{?}	Picture	Name	Street Address	CH1903 X coordinate	CH1903 Y coordinate	Location
4750	Ruins of Frohburg Castle (12th-14th Century)	Ruins of Frohburg Castle (12th-14th Century)		634.080	247.680	47.379071°N 7.88991°E

== Winznau ==
KGS No.^{?}	Picture	Name	Street Address	CH1903 X coordinate	CH1903 Y coordinate	Location
4755		Käsloch, Paleolithic Cave		636.800	246.200	47.365613°N 7.925805°E
