= Blauenstein =

Castle fort in Switzerland

- Kleinlützel
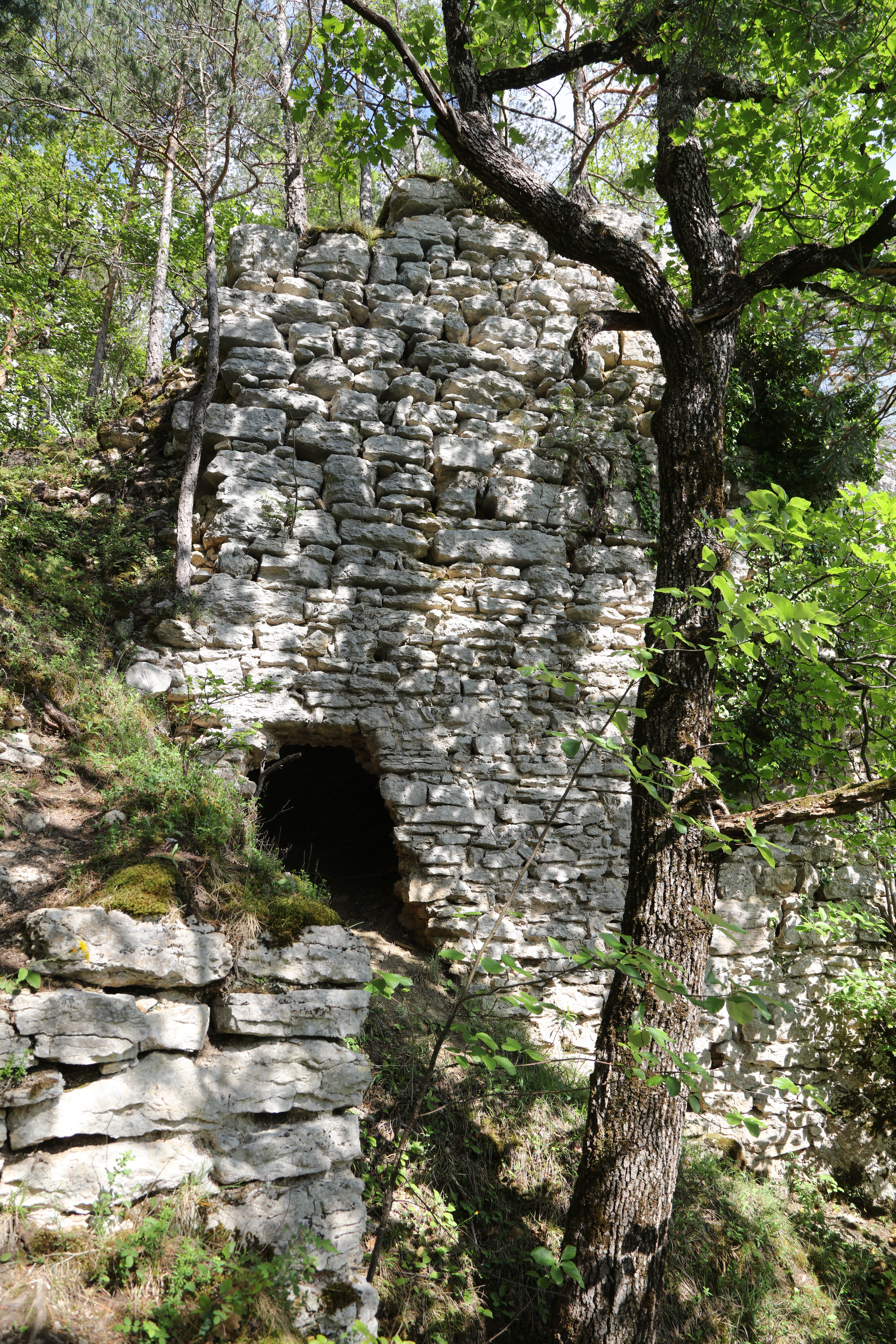
- View of the castle ruins, 2018

Site information
- Type: hill castle
- Code: CH-SO
- Condition: ruin

Location
- Coordinates: 47°25′53″N 7°24′58″E

Site history
- Built: 13th century

Blauenstein is a castle fort on a rocky outcrop north of Kleinlützel, Switzerland.

The castle was probably built in the thirteenth century. It suffered damage during the 1356 Basel earthquake and was destroyed in 1411 by the forces of Basel during the Neuenstein War. There are only a few walls remaining today.

As it was at the junction of important Roman pass on Blauenbergkette, the town of Kleinlützel proposes Roman origins for the castle.

This castle should not be confused with Alt-Falkenstein Castle near Balsthal, neighboring Neu-Falkenstein Castle, as Alt-Falkenstein was historically also known as Blauenstein and appears under that name on historical images, probably because at least Neu-Falkenstein was pledged to Rutschmann of Blauenstein for some time around 1400.
