= Neu-Bechburg Castle =

Castle in Oensingen, Switzerland

Neu Bechburg Castle
- Schloss Neu-Bechburg
- Oensingen
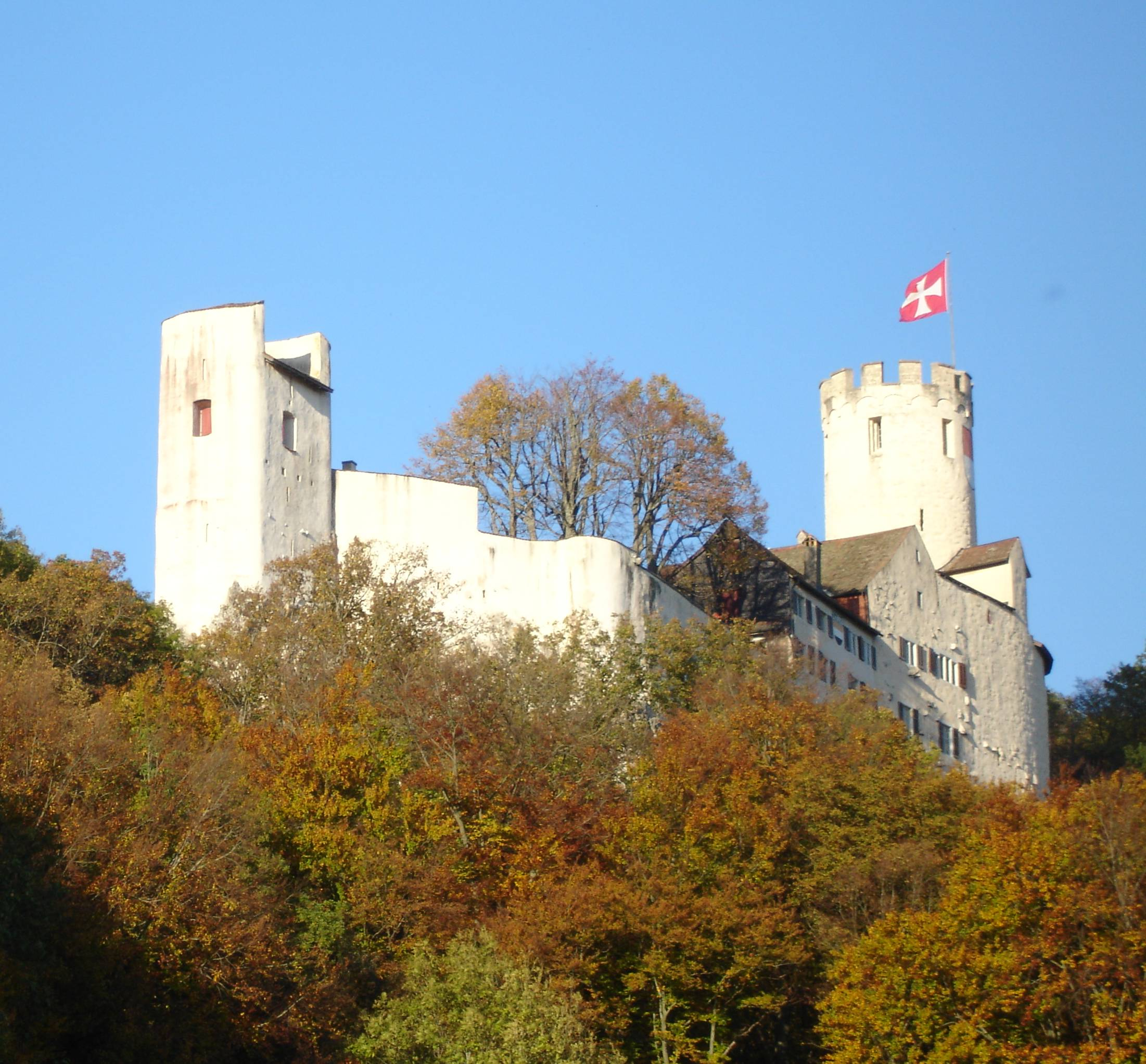
- Neu-Bechburg Cast;e

Site information
- Type: hill castle
- Code: CH-SO
- Condition: Inhabited

Location
- Coordinates: 47°17′50″N 7°43′07″E

Site history
- Built: c. 1250

Garrison information
- Occupants: Freiherr

Neu Bechburg Castle is a castle in the municipality of Oensingen of the Canton of Solothurn in Switzerland. It is a Swiss heritage site of national significance.

== See also ==
- List of castles in Switzerland
