= Blumenstein Castle =

Estate house in Solothurn, Switzerland

Coordinates: 47°12′59″N 7°32′13″E

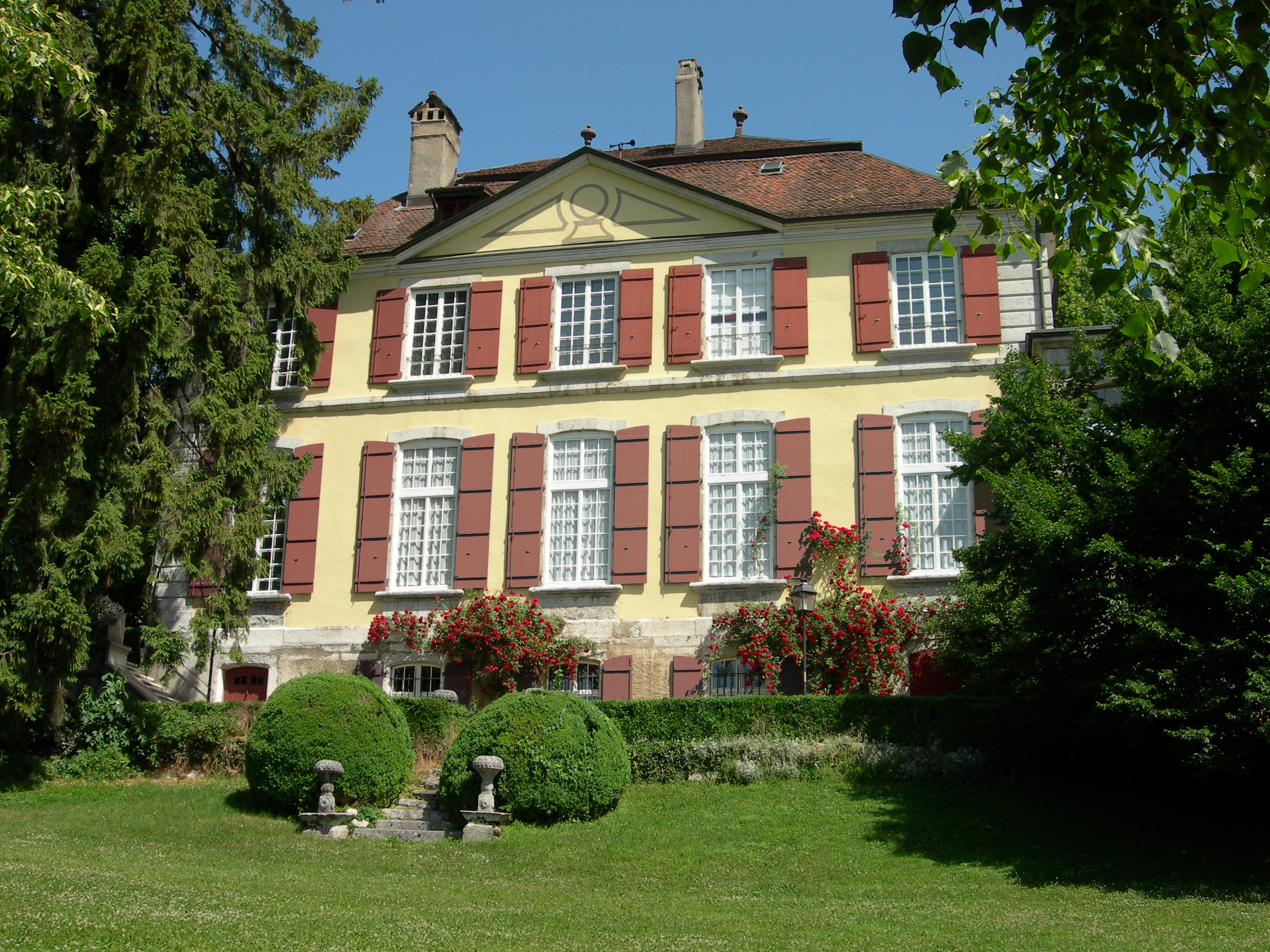
Blumenstein Castle

Blumenstein Castle is an estate house in the municipality of Solothurn of the Canton of Solothurn in Switzerland. It is a Swiss heritage site of national significance. In 1952 it became the home of the Historical Museum of Solothurn.

== History ==
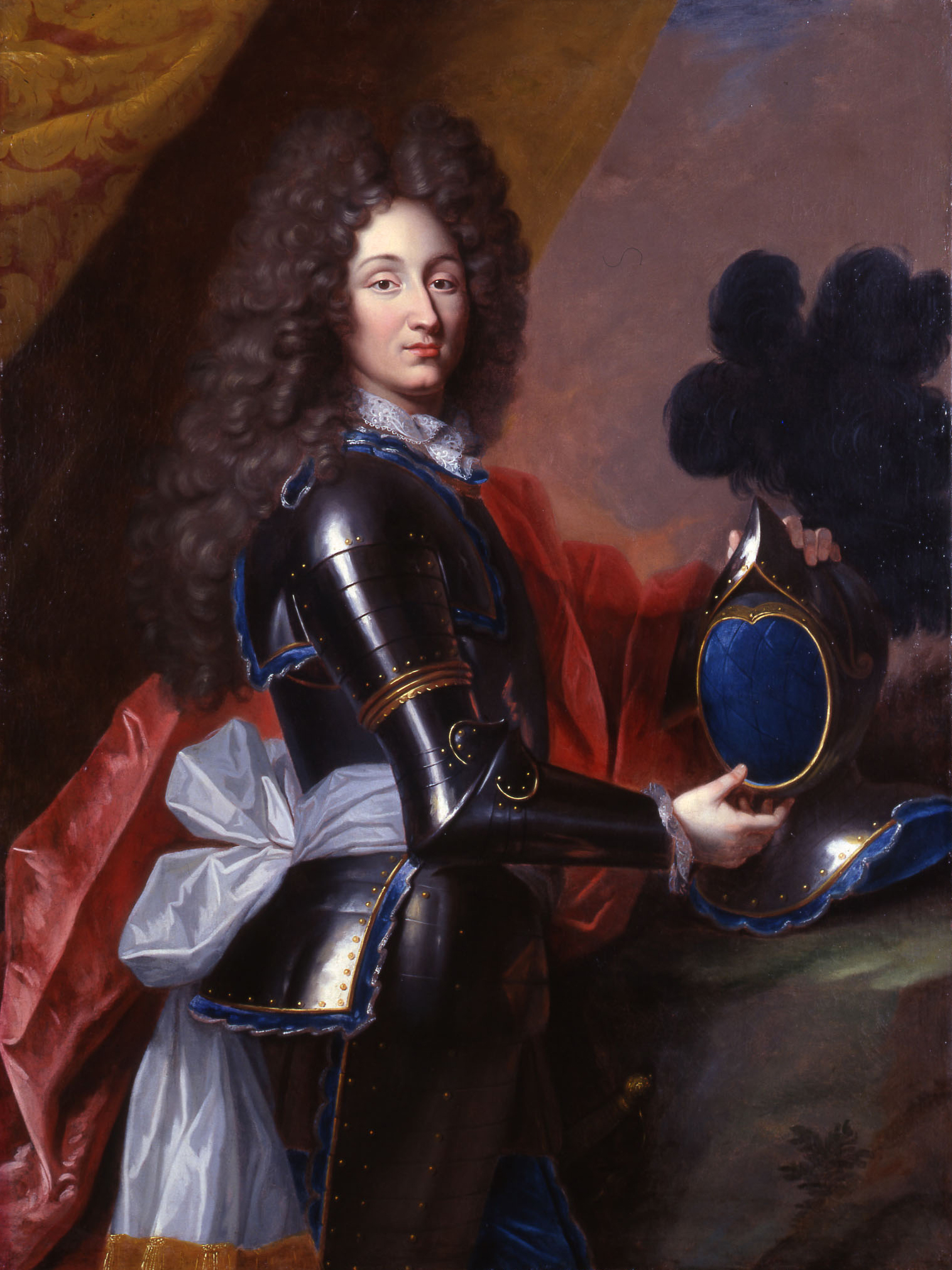
Franz Heinrich von Stäffis-Mollondin (1673–1749)

The Régence style house was built in 1725–28 for the governor Franz Heinrich von Stäffis-Mollondin in the center of a 20 hectares (49 acres) terraced park. After Franz Heinrich's death in 1749 the estate passed to his son Joseph Lorenz von Stäffis-Mollondin. When Joseph died in 1758 without an heir the Stäffis-Mollondin family ended and the estate was divided between his daughters Johanna Karolina Anophe and Ludovika Franziska, their grandmother Jeanne Charlotte Cléophe and their mother Marie Jeanne Nicole. In 1797 Ludovika Franziska married Robert Fidel Carl Wallier von St. Aubin and the entire estate passed to the von St. Aubin family. In 1847 Ludovika Franziska died and Blumenstein passed to her sister in law Charlotte Glutz-Wallier von St. Aubin. About a decade later, in 1856, her sons Edmund, Ludwig and Alfred Glutz-Ruchti inherited the house. In 1861 Edmund bought out his brothers shares and became the only owner of Blumestein.

Edmund Glutz-Ruchti bequeathed Blumenstein in 1885 to his nephew Joseph Glutz-Ruchti. Over next decades Joseph modernized the old building and installed central heating which changed it from a summer residence into a home that was comfortable year round. He supported the renovations and lavish lifestyle by selling the furnishings and the lands around the estate. However, by the mid-1920s he was insolvent. When Joseph went bankrupt, Blumenstein was sold at auction. On 18 October 1928, the Basel architect HR Steuer bought the empty castle and the remaining garden for 400,000 Francs. The garden was divided into lots and sold as building land.

The main building and the land immediately around the building were purchased on 11 September 1933 by Fritz Hirt-Baumgartner for 85,000 francs. Over the following two decades Fritz Hirt-Baumgartner and his wife Lucie attempted to buy back all the furnishings and outbuildings from Blumenstein.

On 7 February 1951 the couple sold Blumenstein for CHF 180,000 along with its inventory for CHF 40,000 to the municipality of Solothurn. The Blumenstein Museum or Historical Museum of Solothurn opened on 3 May 1952. Fritz Hirt-Baumgartner's wife Lucie retained the right to reside in several rooms of the upper floor until her death in 1977.

Today the museum is open Tuesday to Saturday from 2:00PM to 5:00PM and Sunday from 10:00AM until 5:00PM. It is closed Mondays and some holidays. Admission is free and some rooms are available to rent for parties and meetings.

== See also ==
- List of castles in Switzerland
