= Steinbrugg Castle =

Castle in Solothurn, Switzerland

Coordinates: 47°12′44″N 7°32′48″E

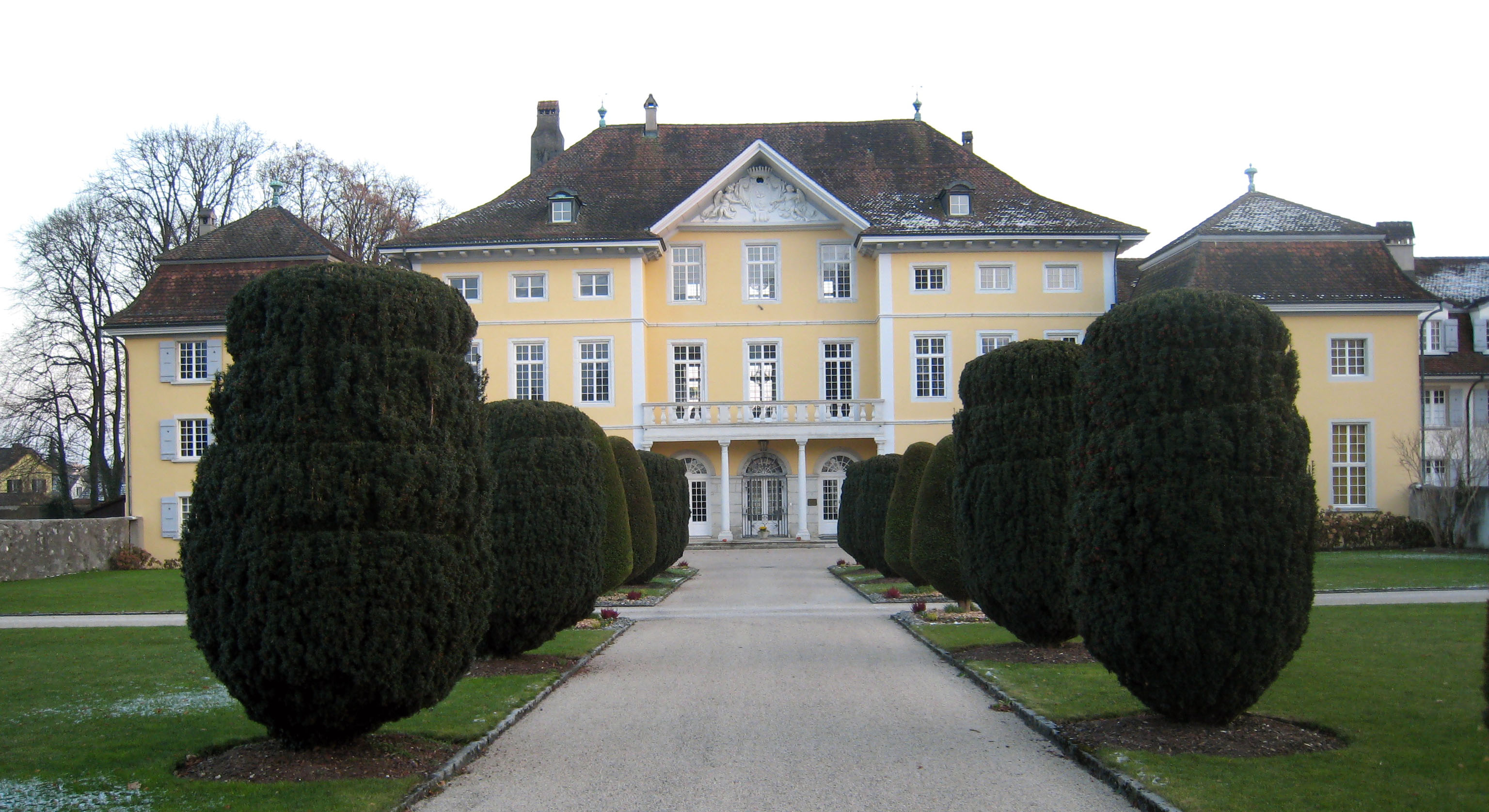
Steinbrugg Castle

Steinbrugg Castle is a castle in the municipality of Solothurn of the Canton of Solothurn in Switzerland. It is a Swiss heritage site of national significance.

== See also ==
- List of castles in Switzerland
