= Oensingen =

- Municipality
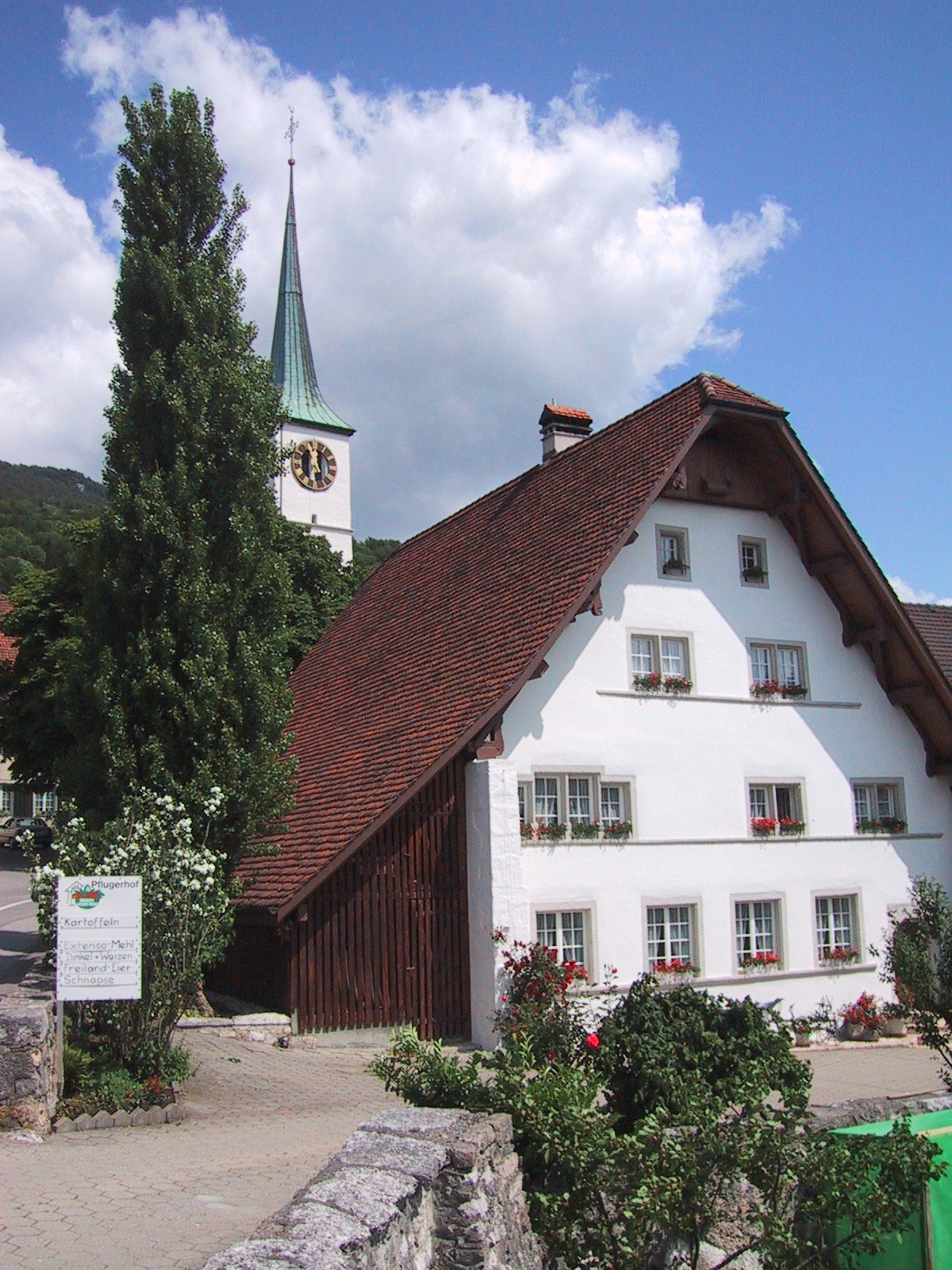
- Oensingen village

- Flag Coat of arms
- Location of Oensingen
- Location within Switzerland Location within Canton of Solothurn
- Coordinates: 47°17′N 7°43′E
- Country: Switzerland
- Canton: Solothurn
- District: Gäu

Area
  - Total: 12.07 km^{2} (4.66 sq mi)
- Elevation: 465 m (1,526 ft)

Population (December 2020)
  - Total: 6,276
  - Density: 520.0/km^{2} (1,347/sq mi)
- Time zone: UTC+01:00 (CET)
  - Summer (DST): UTC+02:00 (CEST)
- Postal code: 4702
- SFOS number: 2407
- ISO 3166 code: CH-SO
- Surrounded by: Balsthal, Kestenholz, Niederbipp (BE), Oberbuchsiten
- Website: www.oensingen.ch

Oensingen is a municipality in the district of Gäu in the canton of Solothurn in Switzerland.

== History ==
Oensingen is first mentioned in 968 as Oingesingin cum ecclesia.

== Geography ==
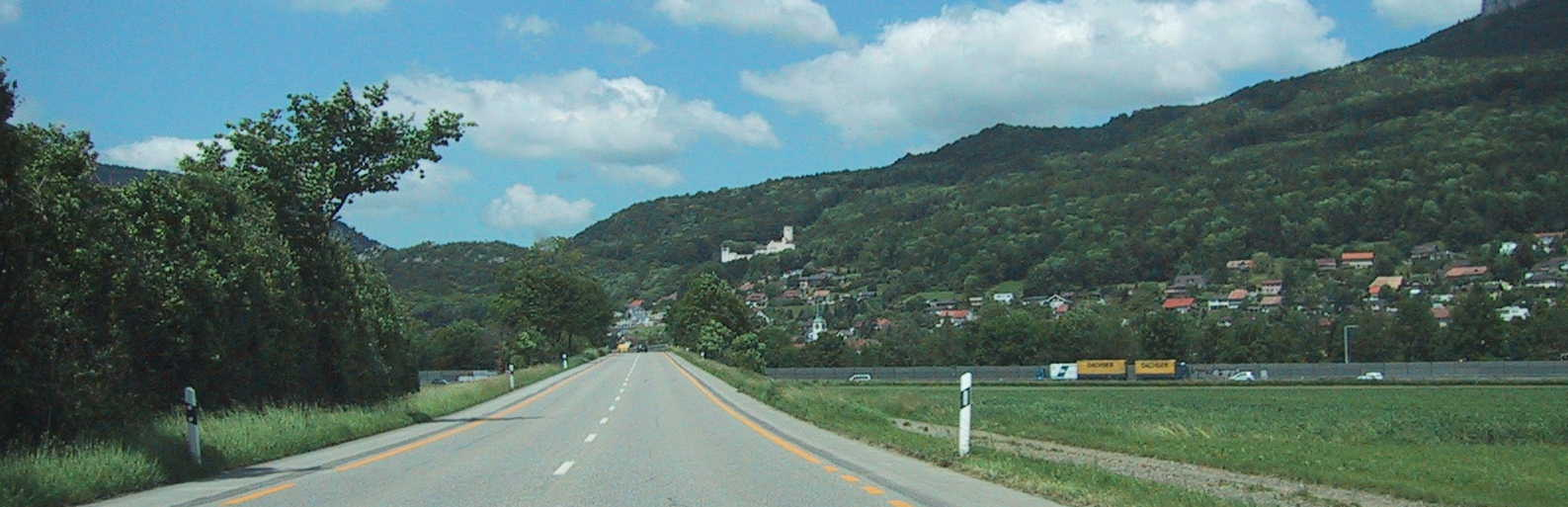
Oensingen

Aerial view (1948)

Oensingen has an area, as of 2009, of 12.07 square kilometers (4.66 sq mi). Of this area, 4.79 km^{2} (1.85 sq mi) or 39.7% is used for agricultural purposes, while 4.49 km^{2} (1.73 sq mi) or 37.2% is forested. Of the rest of the land, 2.65 km^{2} (1.02 sq mi) or 22.0% is settled (buildings or roads), 0.08 km^{2} (20 acres) or 0.7% is either rivers or lakes and 0.03 km^{2} (7.4 acres) or 0.2% is unproductive land.

Of the built up area, industrial buildings made up 4.6% of the total area while housing and buildings made up 8.4% and transportation infrastructure made up 6.1%. Power and water infrastructure as well as other special developed areas made up 2.2% of the area Out of the forested land, 36.1% of the total land area is heavily forested and 1.1% is covered with orchards or small clusters of trees. Of the agricultural land, 31.3% is used for growing crops and 6.7% is pastures and 1.2% is used for alpine pastures. All the water in the municipality is flowing water.

The municipality is located in the Gäu district, at the base of the Jura Mountains at the exit of the Balsthal gorge.

== Coat of arms ==
The blazon of the municipal coat of arms is Gules a Cross pattee couped Argent.

== Demographics ==
Oensingen has a population (as of December 2020) of 6,276. As of 2008, 26.5% of the population are resident foreign nationals. Over the last 10 years (1999–2009) the population has changed at a rate of 14%.

Most of the population (as of 2000) speaks German (3,859 or 85.4%), with Serbo-Croatian being second most common (164 or 3.6%) and Albanian being third (153 or 3.4%). There are 23 people who speak French and 3 people who speak Romansh.

As of 2008, the gender distribution of the population was 51.3% male and 48.7% female. The population was made up of 1,821 Swiss men (36.2% of the population) and 760 (15.1%) non-Swiss men. There were 1,820 Swiss women (36.1%) and 634 (12.6%) non-Swiss women. Of the population in the municipality 1,399 or about 31.0% were born in Oensingen and lived there in 2000. There were 982 or 21.7% who were born in the same canton, while 1,099 or 24.3% were born somewhere else in Switzerland, and 921 or 20.4% were born outside of Switzerland.

In 2008 there were 28 live births to Swiss citizens and 10 births to non-Swiss citizens, and in same time span there were 29 deaths of Swiss citizens and 3 non-Swiss citizen deaths. Ignoring immigration and emigration, the population of Swiss citizens decreased by 1 while the foreign population increased by 7. There were 3 Swiss men and 1 Swiss woman who immigrated back to Switzerland. At the same time, there were 24 non-Swiss men and 17 non-Swiss women who immigrated from another country to Switzerland. The total Swiss population change in 2008 (from all sources, including moves across municipal borders) was an increase of 25 and the non-Swiss population increased by 47 people. This represents a population growth rate of 1.5%.

The age distribution, as of 2000, in Oensingen is; 354 children or 7.8% of the population are between 0 and 6 years old and 739 teenagers or 16.4% are between 7 and 19. Of the adult population, 331 people or 7.3% of the population are between 20 and 24 years old. 1,470 people or 32.5% are between 25 and 44, and 1,078 people or 23.9% are between 45 and 64. The senior population distribution is 403 people or 8.9% of the population are between 65 and 79 years old and there are 142 people or 3.1% who are over 80.

As of 2000, there were 1,916 people who were single and never married in the municipality. There were 2,123 married individuals, 255 widows or widowers and 223 individuals who are divorced.

As of 2000, there were 1,837 private households in the municipality, and an average of 2.4 persons per household. There were 574 households that consist of only one person and 132 households with five or more people. Out of a total of 1,874 households that answered this question, 30.6% were households made up of just one person and there were 22 adults who lived with their parents. Of the rest of the households, there are 533 married couples without children, 592 married couples with children There were 92 single parents with a child or children. There were 24 households that were made up of unrelated people and 37 households that were made up of some sort of institution or another collective housing.

In 2000 there were 513 single-family homes (or 60.0% of the total) out of a total of 855 inhabited buildings. There were 165 multi-family buildings (19.3%), along with 109 multi-purpose buildings that were mostly used for housing (12.7%) and 68 other use buildings (commercial or industrial) that also had some housing (8.0%). Of the single-family homes 47 were built before 1919, while 56 were built between 1990 and 2000. The greatest number of single-family homes (101) were built between 1981 and 1990.

In 2000 there were 1,931 apartments in the municipality. The most common apartment size was 4 rooms of which there were 586. There were 74 single-room apartments and 578 apartments with five or more rooms. Of these apartments, a total of 1,786 apartments (92.5% of the total) were permanently occupied, while 97 apartments (5.0%) were seasonally occupied and 48 apartments (2.5%) were empty. As of 2009, the construction rate of new housing units was 17.7 new units per 1000 residents. The vacancy rate for the municipality, in 2010, was 5.42%.

The historical population is given in the following chart:

== Heritage sites of national significance ==
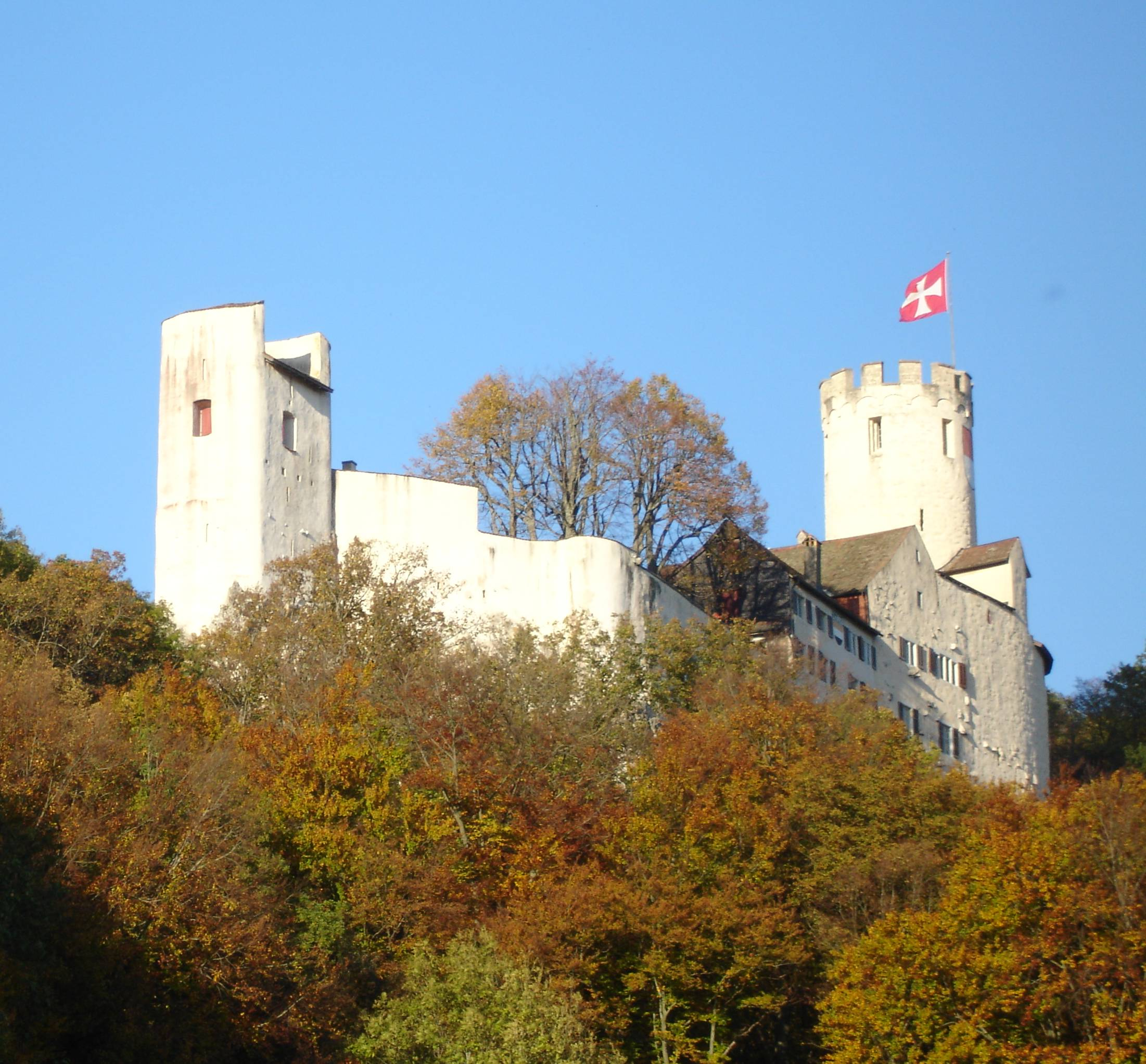
Neu Bechburg Castle

The prehistoric and Roman era hilltop settlement and medieval castle at Lehnflue and Neu Bechburg Castle are listed as Swiss heritage sites of national significance.

== Politics ==
In the 2007 federal election the most popular party was the SVP which received 33.45% of the vote. The next three most popular parties were the FDP (21.96%), the CVP (18.3%) and the SP (17.74%). In the federal election, a total of 1,377 votes were cast, and the voter turnout was 46.8%.

== Economy ==
As of 2010, Oensingen had an unemployment rate of 4.5%. As of 2008, there were 68 people employed in the primary economic sector and about 14 businesses involved in this sector. 1,880 people were employed in the secondary sector and there were 85 businesses in this sector. 2,944 people were employed in the tertiary sector, with 228 businesses in this sector. There were 2,509 residents of the municipality who were employed in some capacity, of which females made up 42.7% of the workforce.

In 2008 the total number of full-time equivalent jobs was 4,361. The number of jobs in the primary sector was 37, of which 36 were in agriculture and 1 was in forestry or lumber production. The number of jobs in the secondary sector was 1,776 of which 1,376 or (77.5%) were in manufacturing and 358 (20.2%) were in construction. The number of jobs in the tertiary sector was 2,548. In the tertiary sector; 936 or 36.7% were in wholesale or retail sales or the repair of motor vehicles, 321 or 12.6% were in the movement and storage of goods, 86 or 3.4% were in a hotel or restaurant, 31 or 1.2% were in the information industry, 45 or 1.8% were the insurance or financial industry, 165 or 6.5% were technical professionals or scientists, 54 or 2.1% were in education and 594 or 23.3% were in health care.

In 2000, there were 2,690 workers who commuted into the municipality and 1,415 workers who commuted away. The municipality is a net importer of workers, with about 1.9 workers entering the municipality for every one leaving. Of the working population, 13.9% used public transportation to get to work, and 57.3% used a private car.

== Religion ==
From the 2000 census, 1,893 or 41.9% were Roman Catholic, while 1,242 or 27.5% belonged to the Swiss Reformed Church. Of the rest of the population, there were 201 members of an Orthodox church (or about 4.45% of the population), there were 6 individuals (or about 0.13% of the population) who belonged to the Christian Catholic Church, and there were 63 individuals (or about 1.39% of the population) who belonged to another Christian church. There were 487 (or about 10.78% of the population) who were Islamic. There were 24 individuals who were Buddhist, 10 individuals who were Hindu and 2 individuals who belonged to another church. 462 (or about 10.23% of the population) belonged to no church, are agnostic or atheist, and 127 individuals (or about 2.81% of the population) did not answer the question.

== Education ==
In Oensingen about 1,721 or (38.1%) of the population have completed non-mandatory upper secondary education, and 418 or (9.3%) have completed additional higher education (either university or a Fachhochschule). Of the 418 who completed tertiary schooling, 72.0% were Swiss men, 15.8% were Swiss women, 8.1% were non-Swiss men and 4.1% were non-Swiss women.

During the 2010-2011 school year there were a total of 431 students in the Oensingen school system. The education system in the Canton of Solothurn allows young children to attend two years of non-obligatory Kindergarten. During that school year, there were 96 children in kindergarten. The canton's school system requires students to attend six years of primary school, with some of the children attending smaller, specialized classes. In the municipality there were 335 students in primary school. The secondary school program consists of three lower, obligatory years of schooling, followed by three to five years of optional, advanced schools. All the lower secondary students from Oensingen attend their school in a neighboring municipality.

As of 2000, there were 186 students in Oensingen who came from another municipality, while 138 residents attended schools outside the municipality.

Oensingen is home to the Gemeinde-Bibliothek Oensingen library. The library has (as of 2008) 15,633 books or other media, and loaned out 53,815 items in the same year. It was open a total of 235 days with average of 15 hours per week during that year.
