= Neu-Falkenstein Castle =

Castle in Balsthal, Switzerland

- Balsthal
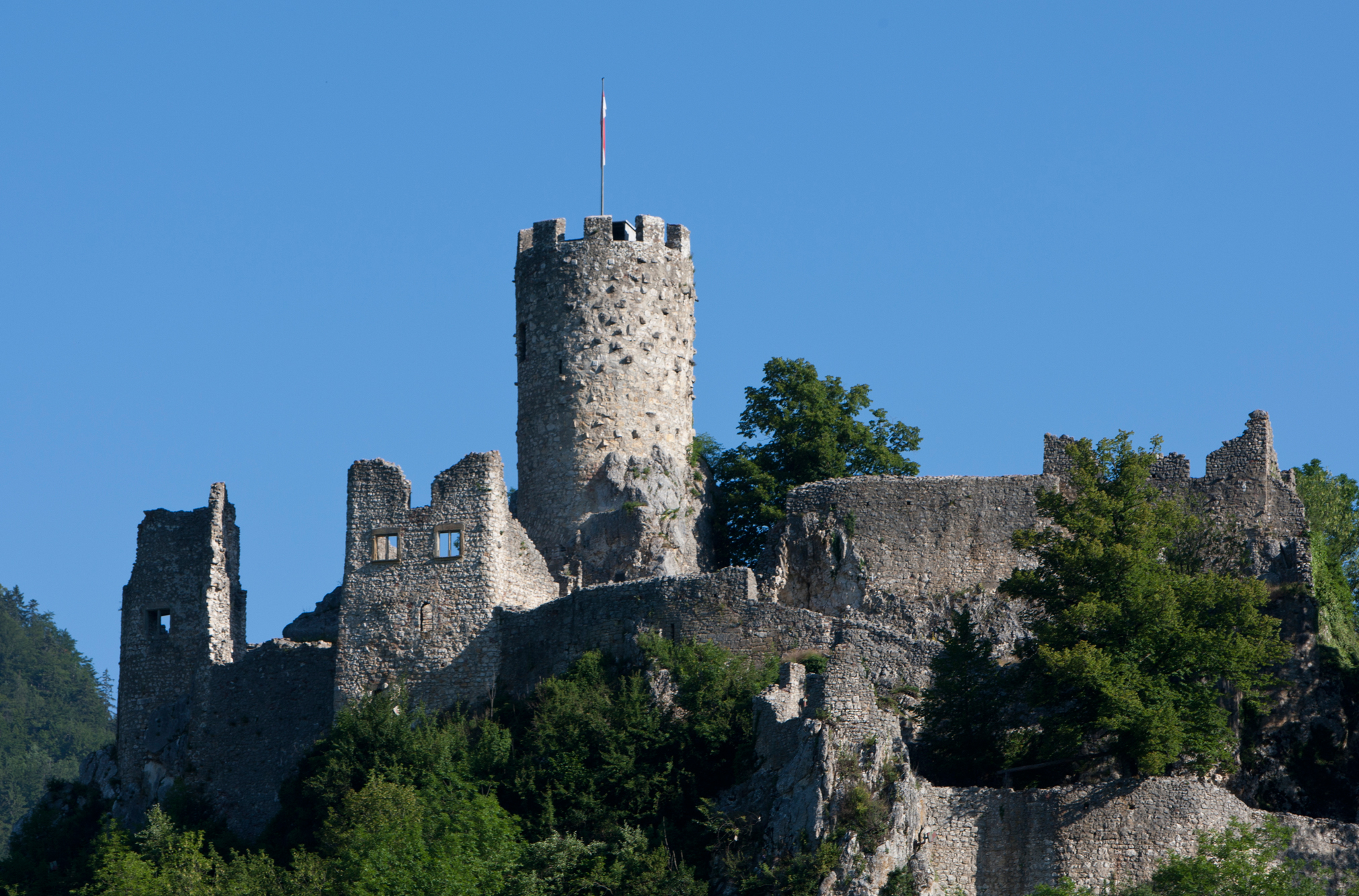
- Ruins of Neu-Falkenstein

Site information
- Type: hill castle
- Code: CH-SO
- Condition: ruin

Location
- Coordinates: 47°19′22″N 7°42′36″E
- Height: 595 m above the sea

Site history
- Built: c. 1100

Neu-Falkenstein Castle is a castle in the municipality of Balsthal of the Canton of Solothurn in Switzerland. It is a Swiss heritage site of national significance.

== Image gallery ==
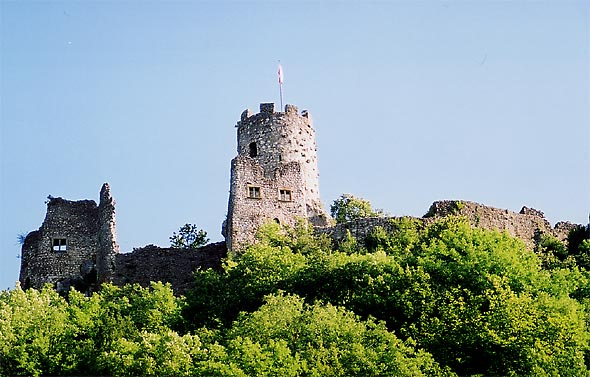
Neu-Falkenstein Castle

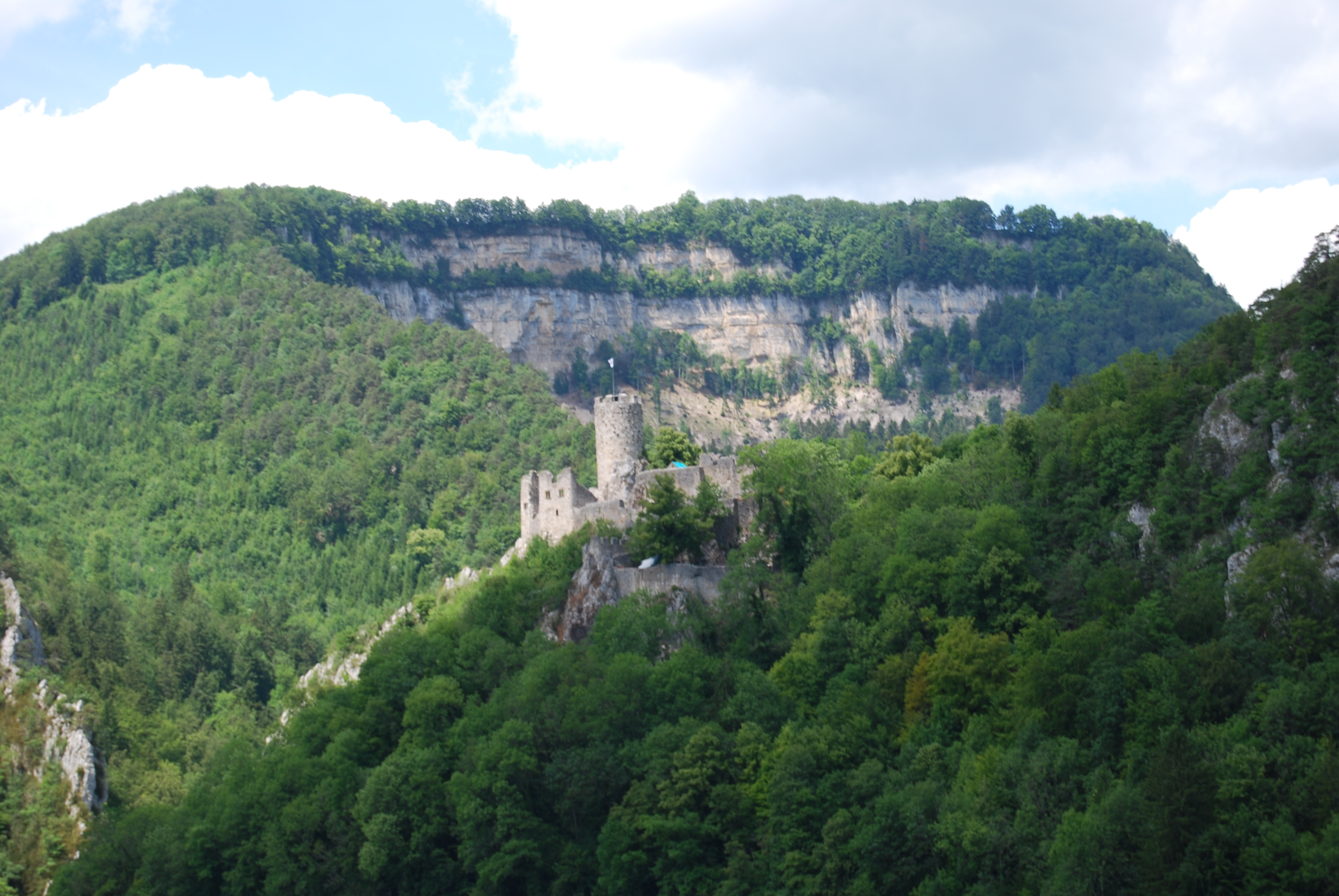

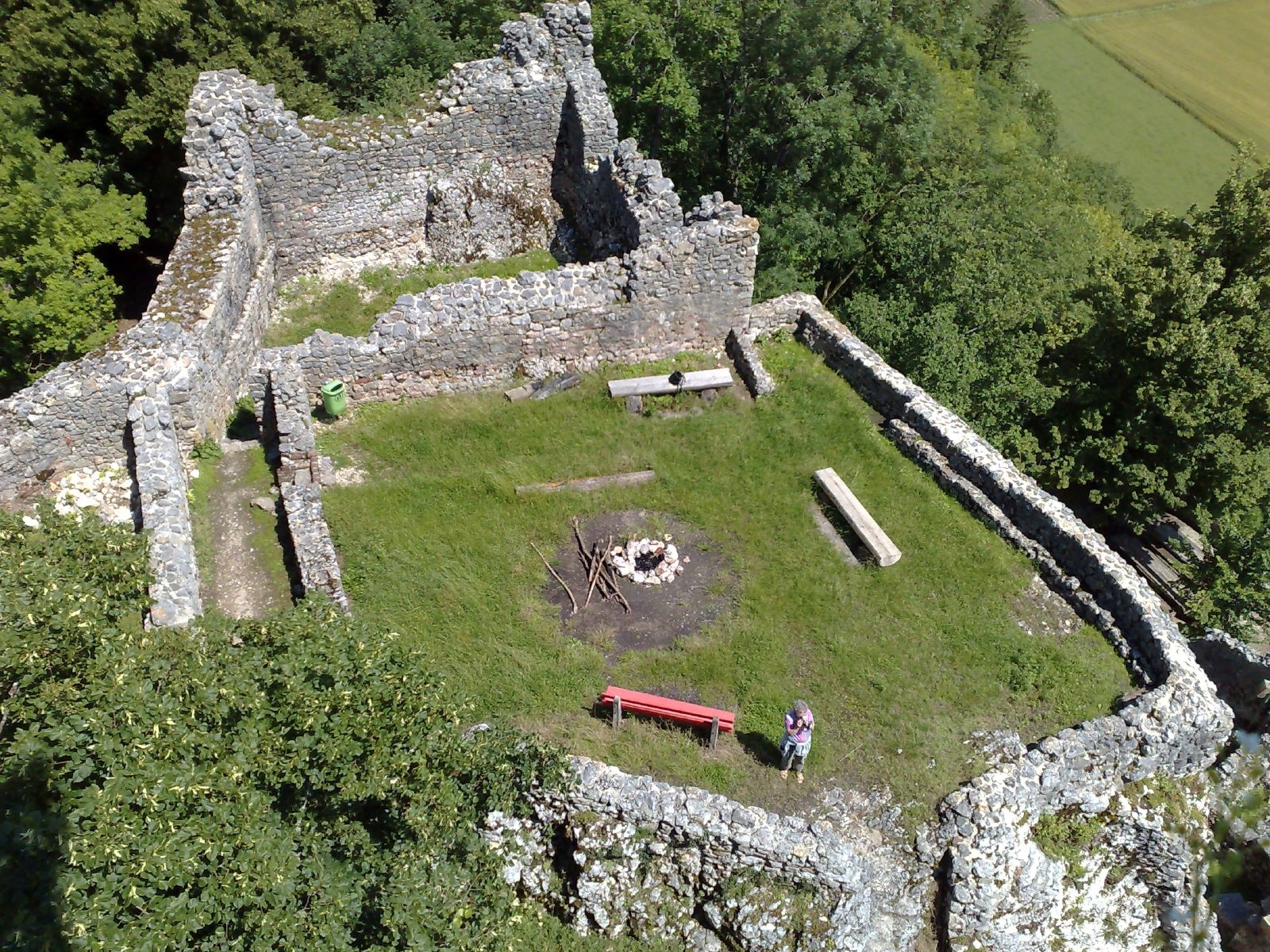

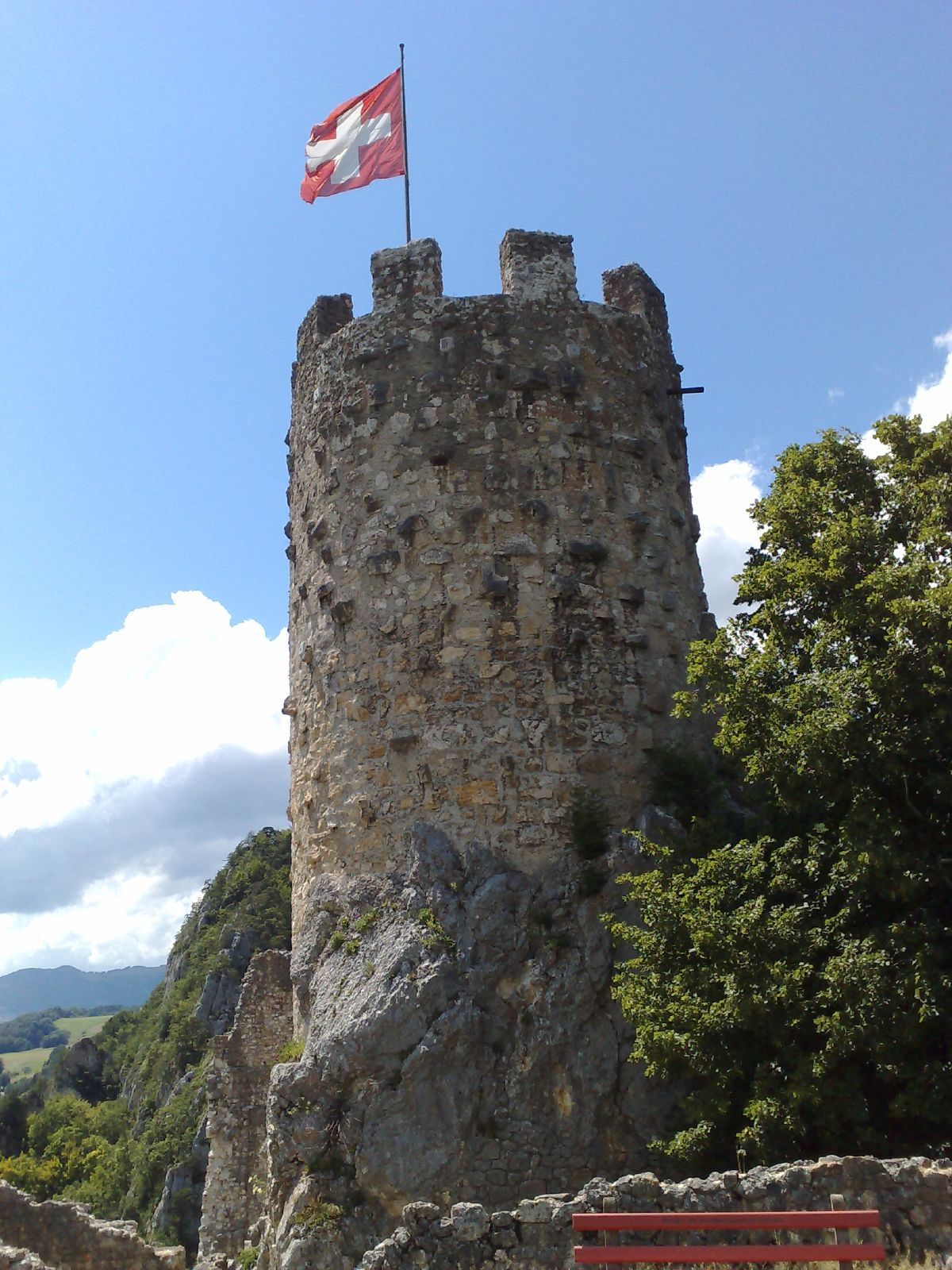

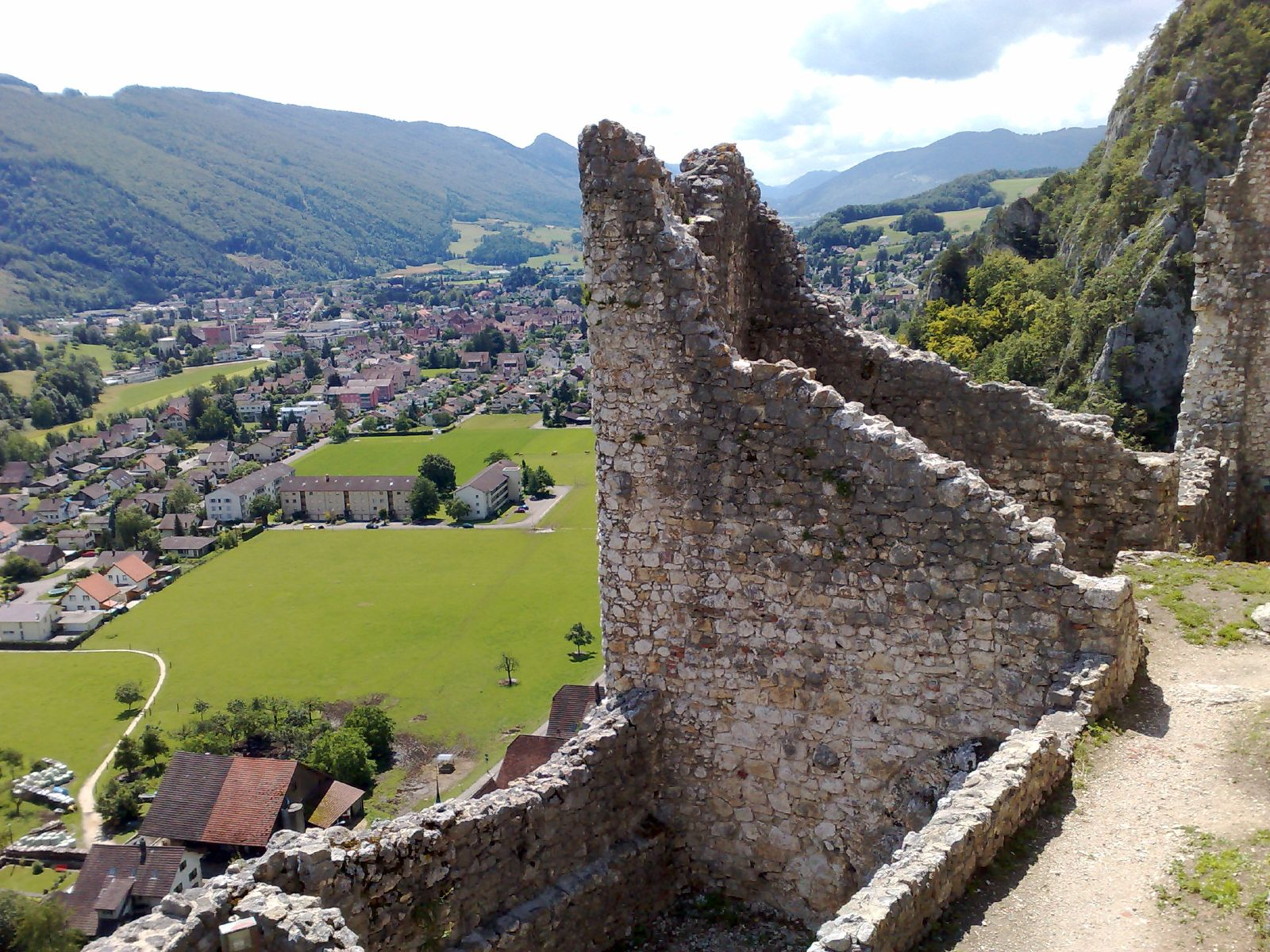

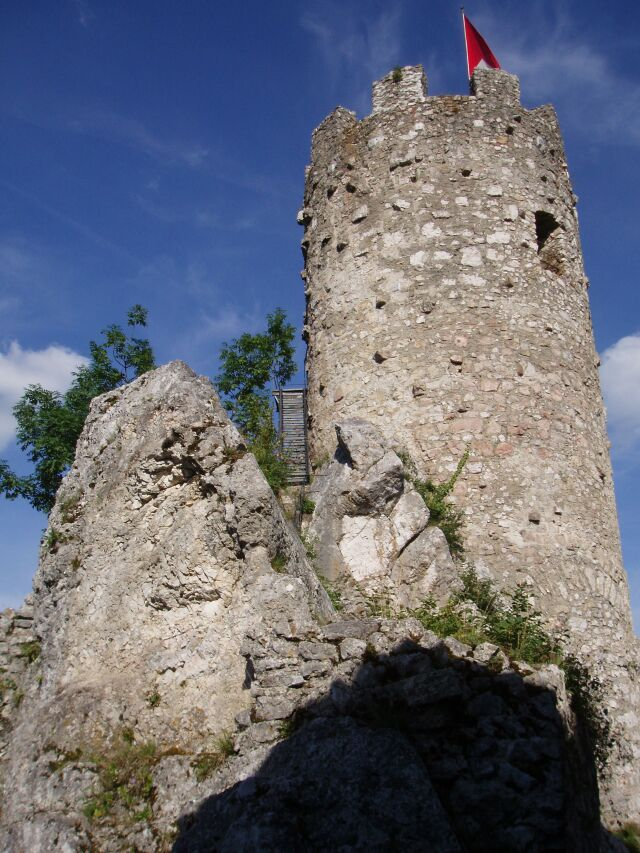

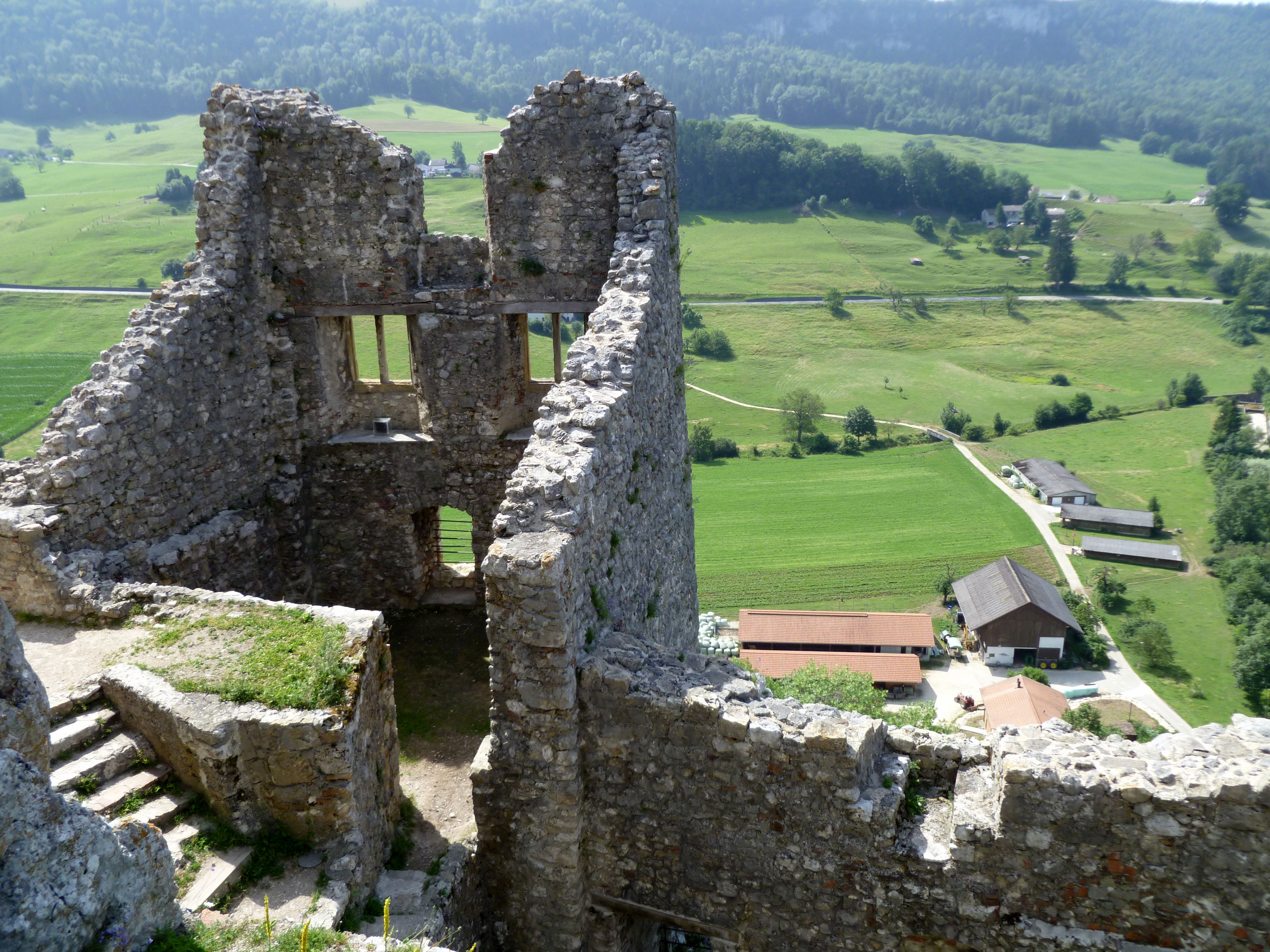

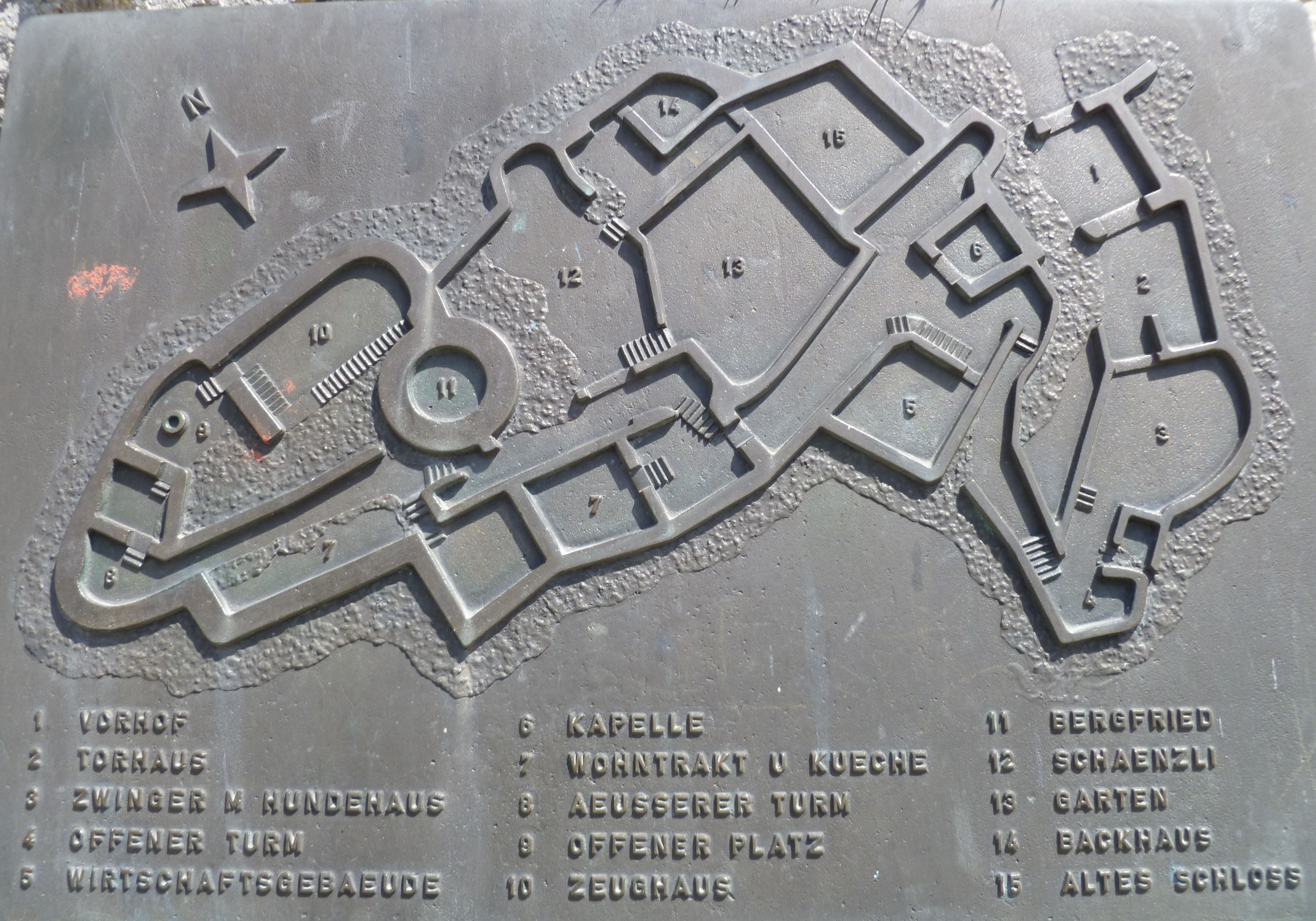

== See also ==
- List of castles in Switzerland
