= Balsthal =

- Municipality
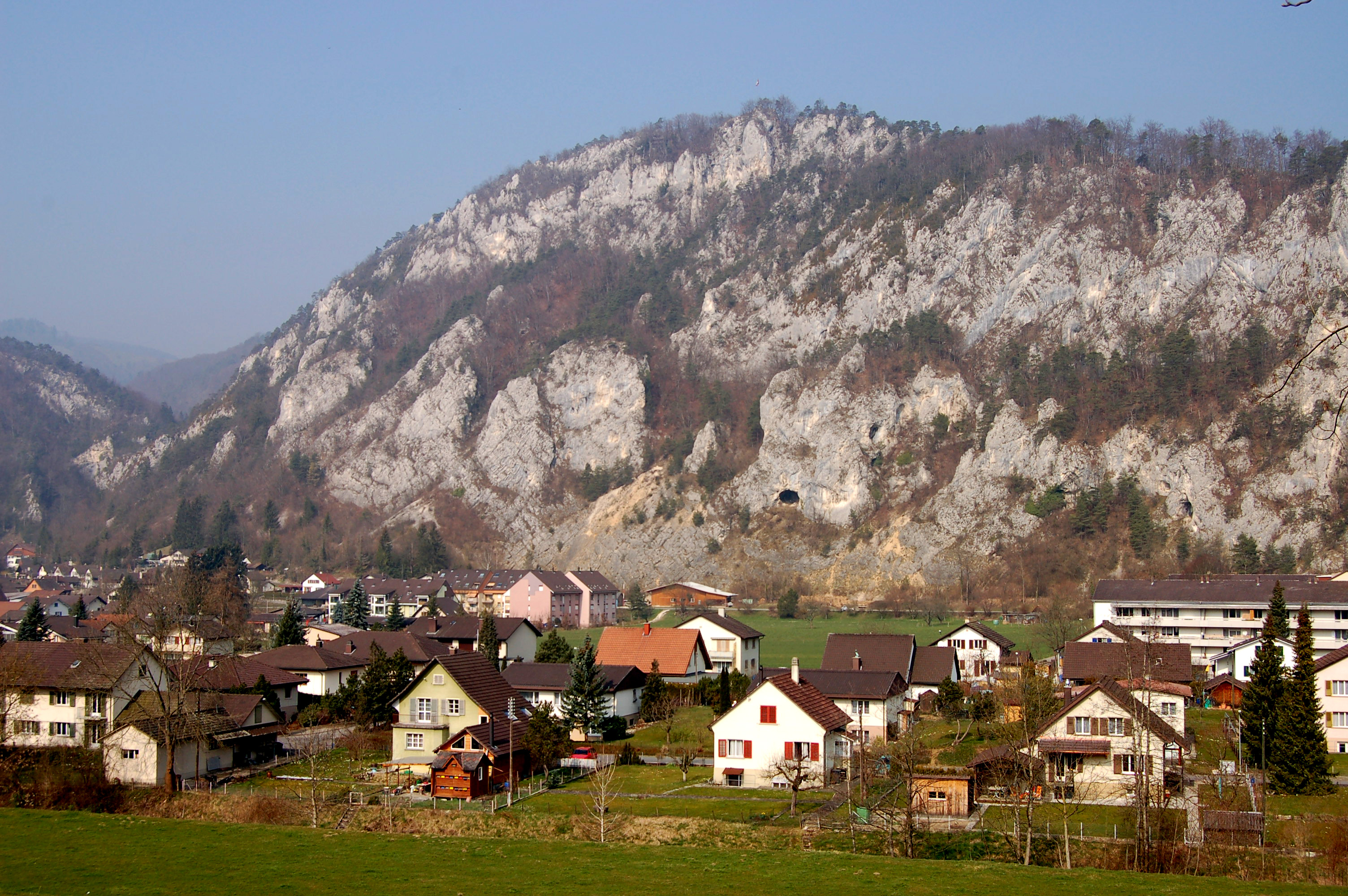
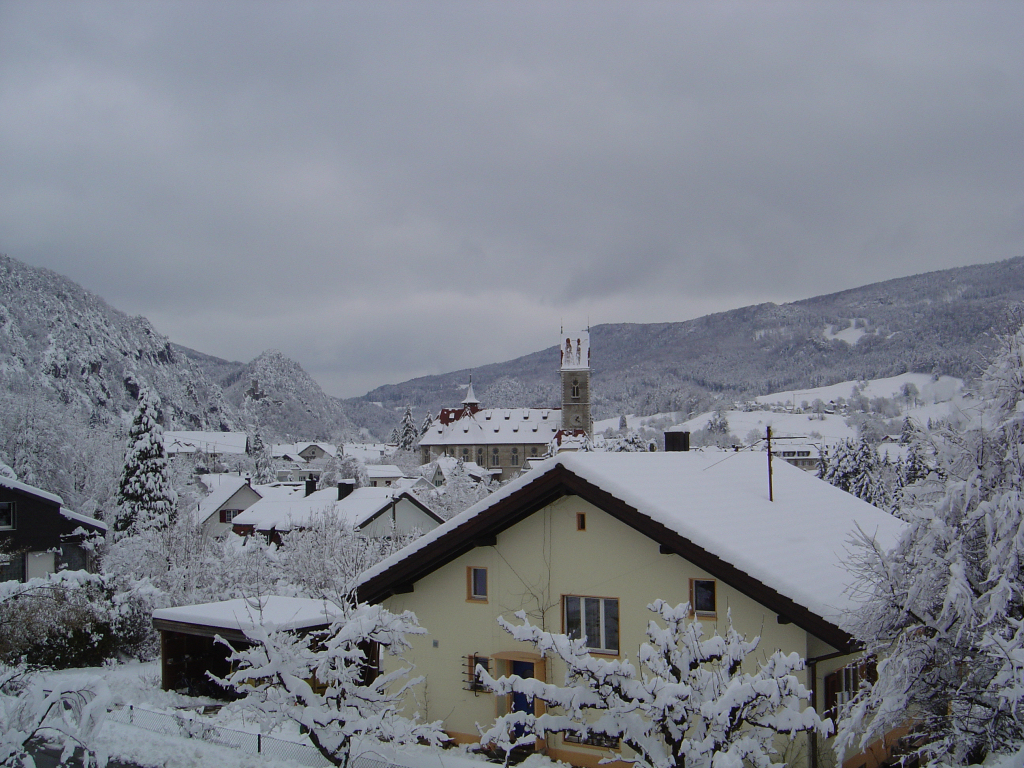

- Flag Coat of arms
- Location of Balsthal
- Location within Switzerland Location within Canton of Solothurn
- Coordinates: 47°19′N 7°42′E
- Country: Switzerland
- Canton: Solothurn
- District: Thal

Area
  - Total: 15.71 km^{2} (6.07 sq mi)
- Elevation: 489 m (1,604 ft)

Population (December 2020)
  - Total: 6,210
  - Density: 395/km^{2} (1,020/sq mi)
- Time zone: UTC+01:00 (CET)
  - Summer (DST): UTC+02:00 (CEST)
- Postal code: 4710
- SFOS number: 2422
- ISO 3166 code: CH-SO
- Surrounded by: Holderbank, Laupersdorf, Mümliswil-Ramiswil, Niederbipp (BE), Oberbuchsiten, Oensingen
- Website: balsthal.ch

Balsthal is a municipality in the district of Thal in the canton of Solothurn in Switzerland.

== History ==
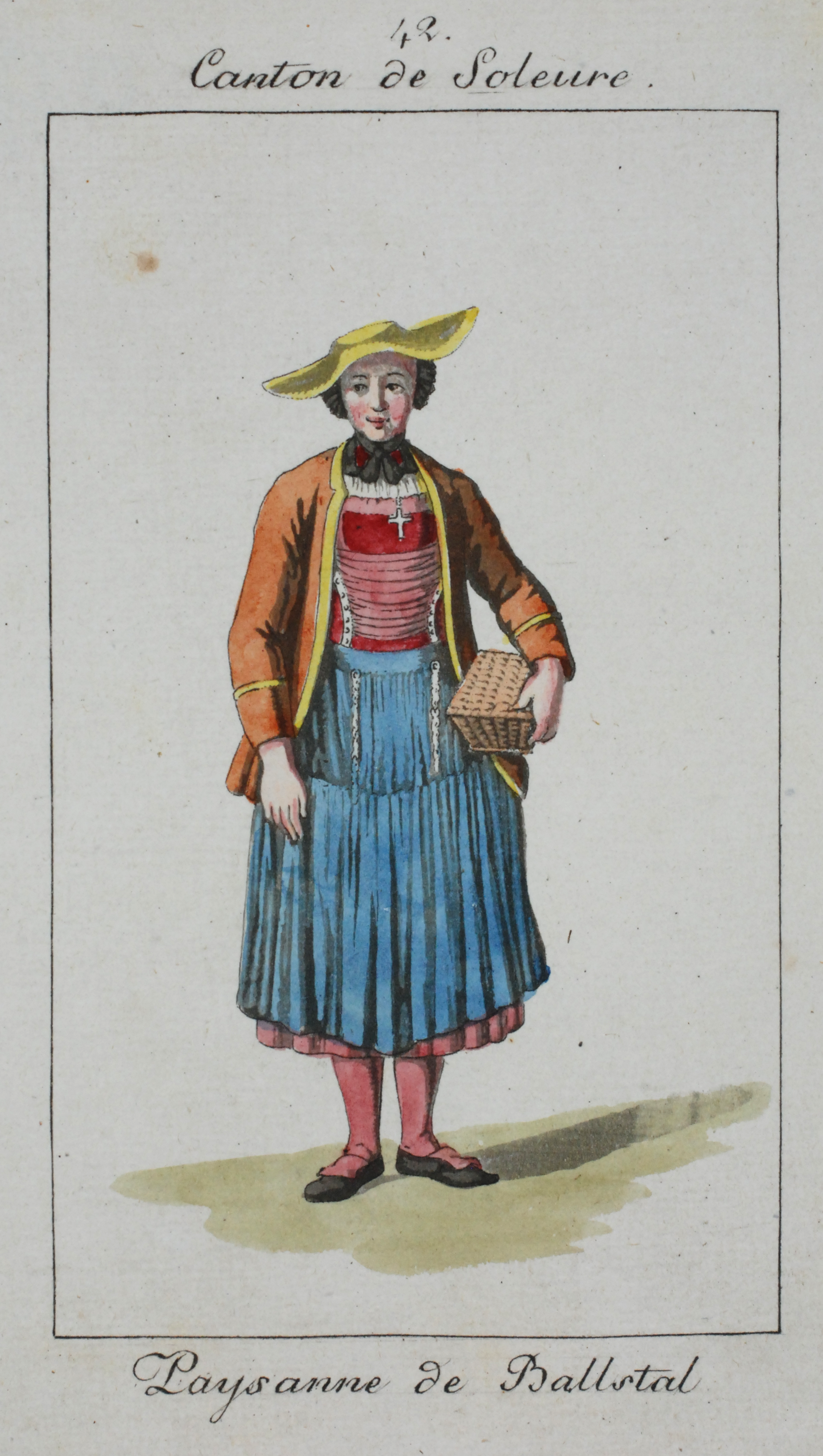
Woman shown in a traditional costume from Balsthal.

Balsthal is first mentioned in 968 as Palcivallis. In 1255 it was mentioned as Balcetal.

== Geography ==
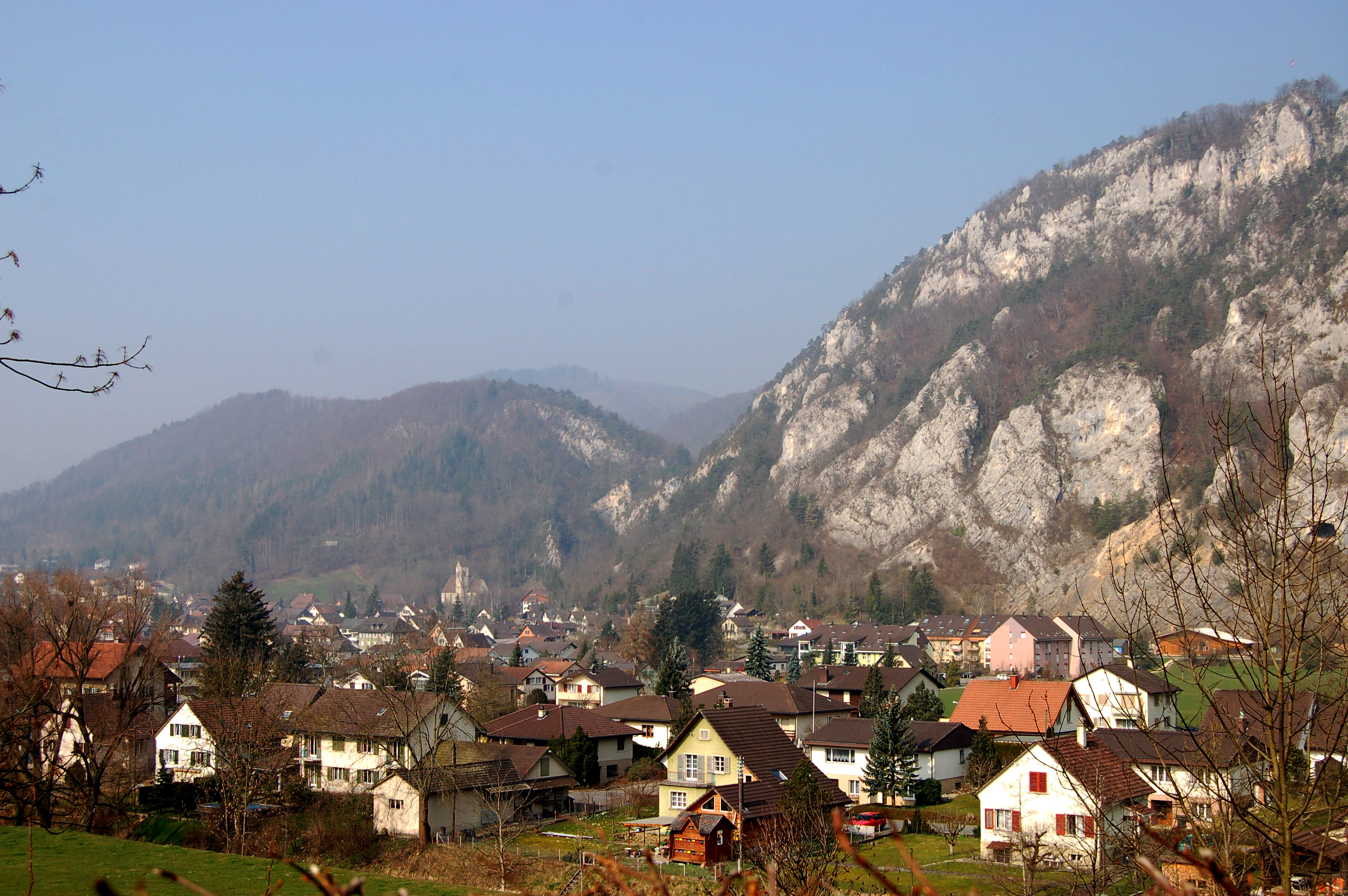
Balsthal town

Aerial view by Walter Mittelholzer (1932)

Balsthal has an area, as of 2009, of 15.71 square kilometers (6.07 sq mi). Of this area, 4.62 km^{2} (1.78 sq mi) or 29.4% is used for agricultural purposes, while 8.53 km^{2} (3.29 sq mi) or 54.3% is forested. Of the rest of the land, 2.26 km^{2} (0.87 sq mi) or 14.4% is settled (buildings or roads), 0.1 km^{2} (25 acres) or 0.6% is either rivers or lakes and 0.18 km^{2} (0.069 sq mi) or 1.1% is unproductive land.

Of the built up area, industrial buildings made up 2.2% of the total area while housing and buildings made up 7.3% and transportation infrastructure made up 3.6%. Out of the forested land, 53.1% of the total land area is heavily forested and 1.2% is covered with orchards or small clusters of trees. Of the agricultural land, 6.4% is used for growing crops and 19.7% is pastures and 2.7% is used for alpine pastures. All the water in the municipality is flowing water.

The municipality is located in the Thal district. It was a market town and administrative center for the Oberen Hauenstein. It consists of the village of Balsthal, the industrial settlement of Klus and the hamlets of Sankt Wolfgang.

== Coat of arms ==
The blazon of the municipal coat of arms is Azure two Snakes Argent in saltire bowed embowed reguardant.

== Demographics ==
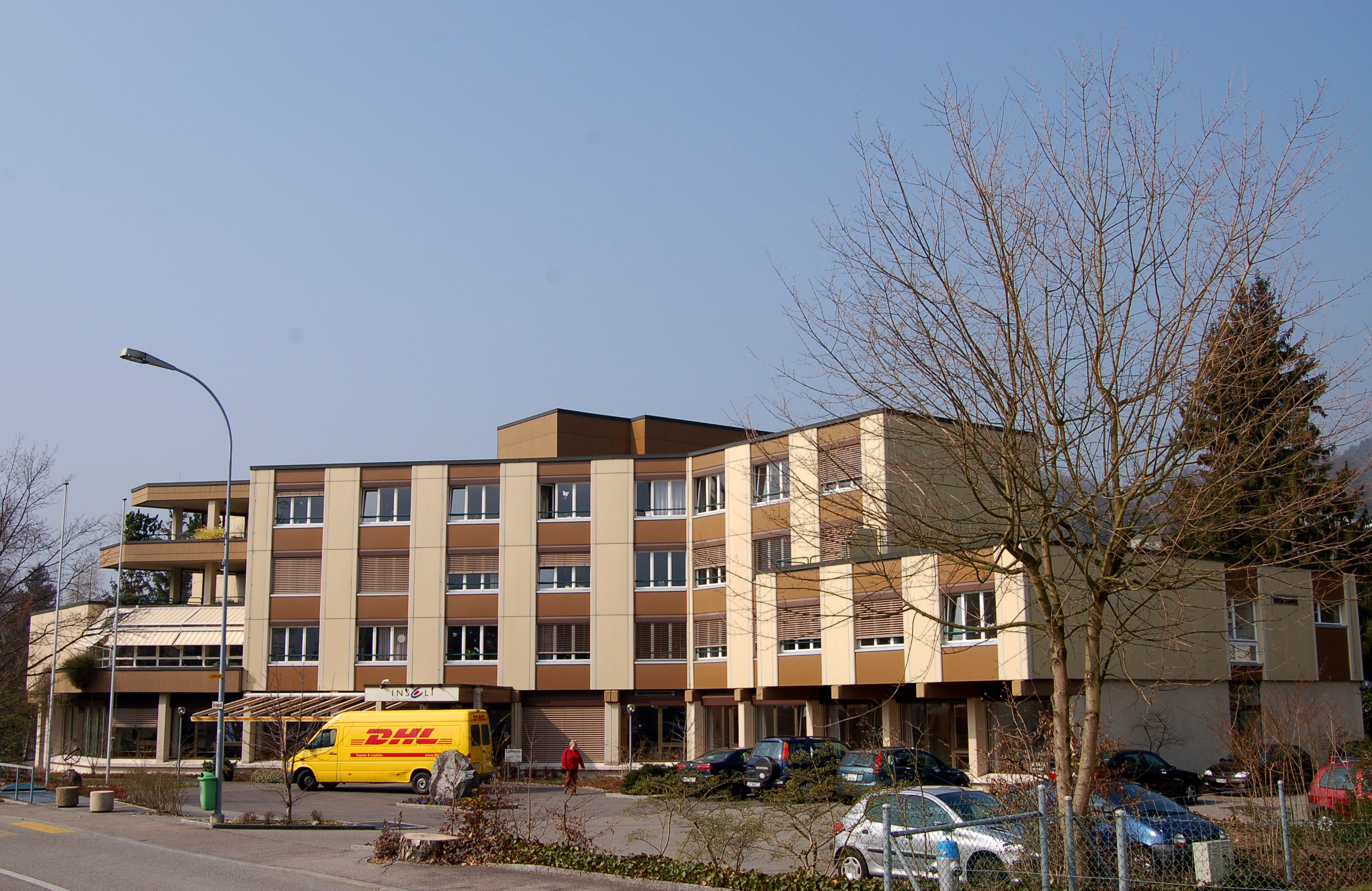
Modern building in Balsthal

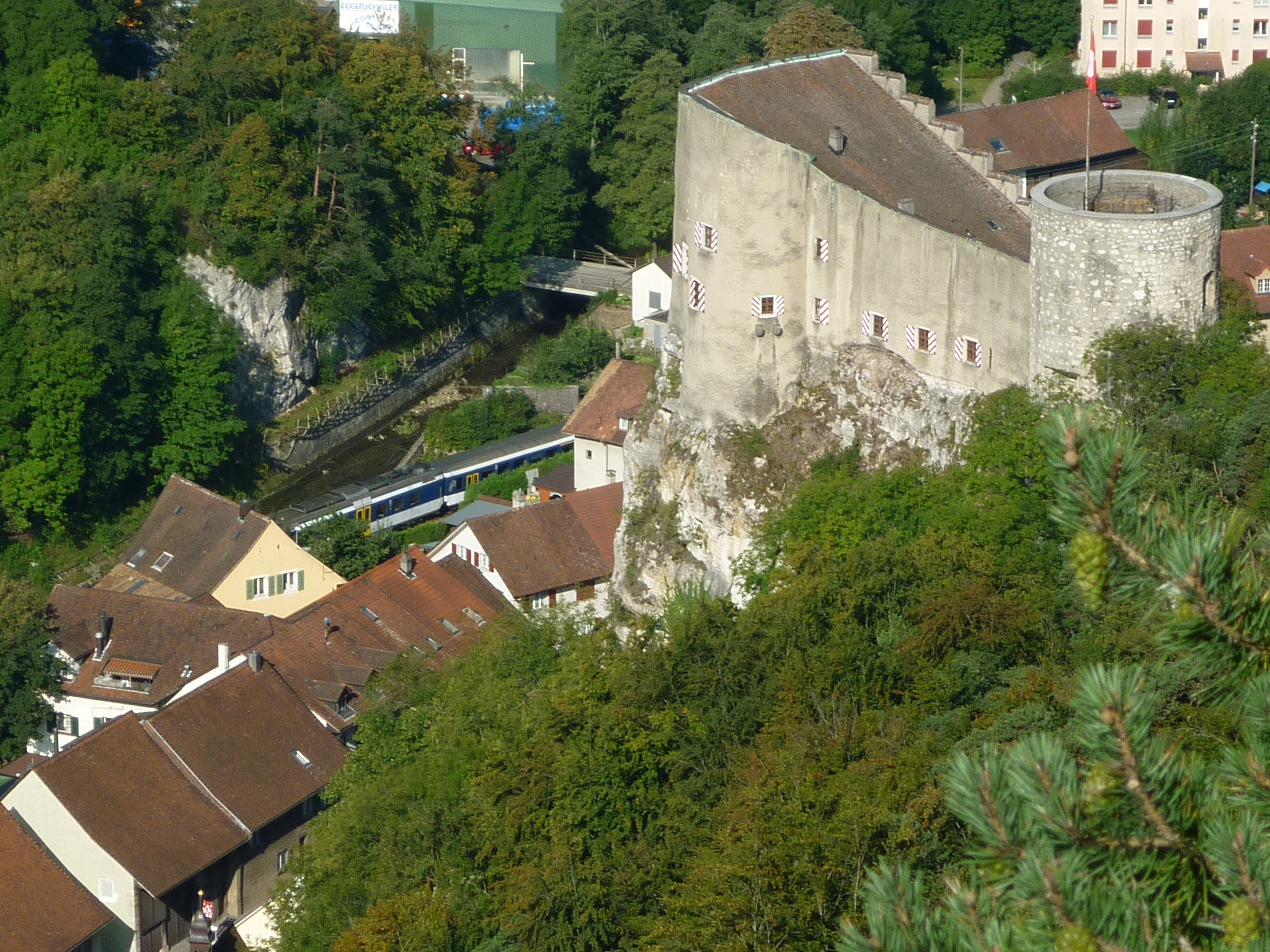
Castle and buildings in Klus

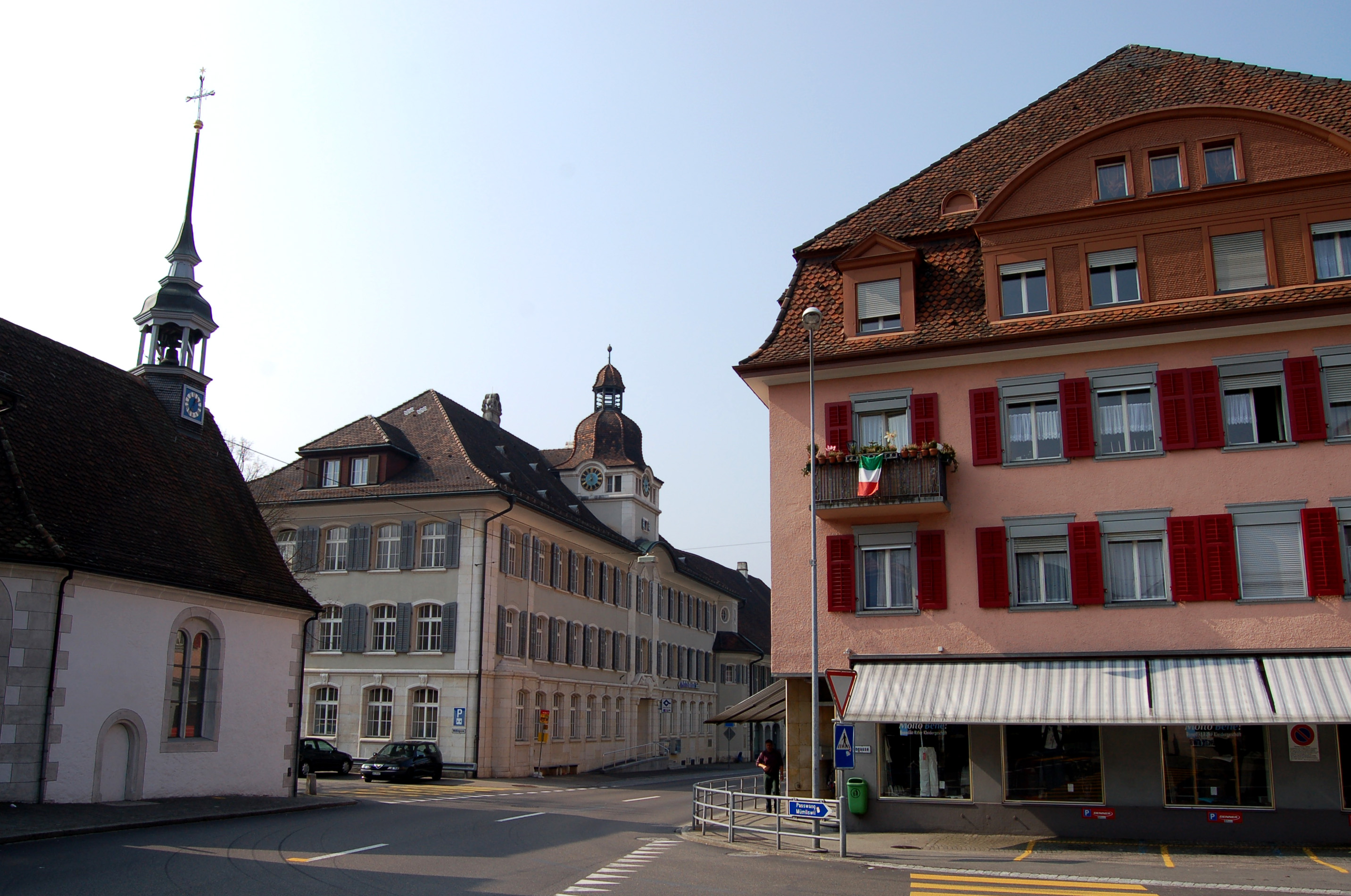
Buildings in Balsthal

Balsthal has a population (as of December 2020) of 6,210. As of 2008, 28.9% of the population are resident foreign nationals. Over the last 10 years (1999–2009) the population has changed at a rate of 1.7%.

Most of the population (as of 2000) speaks German (4,728 or 84.8%), with Albanian being second most common (163 or 2.9%) and Italian being third (153 or 2.7%). There are 40 people who speak French and 2 people who speak Romansh.

As of 2008, the gender distribution of the population was 51.0% male and 49.0% female. The population was made up of 1,993 Swiss men (34.4% of the population) and 962 (16.6%) non-Swiss men. There were 2,032 Swiss women (35.1%) and 802 (13.9%) non-Swiss women. Of the population in the municipality 2,040 or about 36.6% were born in Balsthal and lived there in 2000. There were 1,179 or 21.2% who were born in the same canton, while 1,006 or 18.0% were born somewhere else in Switzerland, and 1,156 or 20.7% were born outside of Switzerland.

In 2008 there were 29 live births to Swiss citizens and 30 births to non-Swiss citizens, and in same time span there were 39 deaths of Swiss citizens and 6 non-Swiss citizen deaths. Ignoring immigration and emigration, the population of Swiss citizens decreased by 10 while the foreign population increased by 24. There were 15 Swiss men and 9 Swiss women who immigrated back to Switzerland. At the same time, there were 56 non-Swiss men and 25 non-Swiss women who immigrated from another country to Switzerland. The total Swiss population change in 2008 (from all sources, including moves across municipal borders) was a decrease of 34 and the non-Swiss population increased by 87 people. This represents a population growth rate of 0.9%.

The age distribution, as of 2000, in Balsthal is; 401 children or 7.2% of the population are between 0 and 6 years old and 976 teenagers or 17.5% are between 7 and 19. Of the adult population, 300 people or 5.4% of the population are between 20 and 24 years old. 1,681 people or 30.2% are between 25 and 44, and 1,295 people or 23.2% are between 45 and 64. The senior population distribution is 651 people or 11.7% of the population are between 65 and 79 years old and there are 270 people or 4.8% who are over 80.

As of 2000, there were 2,237 people who were single and never married in the municipality. There were 2,693 married individuals, 381 widows or widowers and 263 individuals who are divorced.

As of 2000, there were 2,232 private households in the municipality, and an average of 2.4 persons per household. There were 677 households that consist of only one person and 165 households with five or more people. Out of a total of 2,282 households that answered this question, 29.7% were households made up of just one person and there were 16 adults who lived with their parents. Of the rest of the households, there are 655 married couples without children, 744 married couples with children There were 120 single parents with a child or children. There were 20 households that were made up of unrelated people and 50 households that were made up of some sort of institution or another collective housing.

In 2000 there were 962 single family homes (or 67.9% of the total) out of a total of 1,417 inhabited buildings. There were 256 multi-family buildings (18.1%), along with 113 multi-purpose buildings that were mostly used for housing (8.0%) and 86 other use buildings (commercial or industrial) that also had some housing (6.1%). Of the single family homes 85 were built before 1919, while 92 were built between 1990 and 2000. The greatest number of single family homes (288) were built between 1919 and 1945.

In 2000 there were 2,454 apartments in the municipality. The most common apartment size was 4 rooms of which there were 731. There were 108 single room apartments and 835 apartments with five or more rooms. Of these apartments, a total of 2,179 apartments (88.8% of the total) were permanently occupied, while 126 apartments (5.1%) were seasonally occupied and 149 apartments (6.1%) were empty. As of 2009, the construction rate of new housing units was 1.9 new units per 1000 residents. The vacancy rate for the municipality, in 2010, was 1.02%.

The historical population is given in the following chart:

== Heritage sites of national significance ==
The ruins of Neu-Falkenstein Castle is listed as a Swiss heritage site of national significance. The entire town of Balsthal and the Factories of the Innere Klus are part of the Inventory of Swiss Heritage Sites.

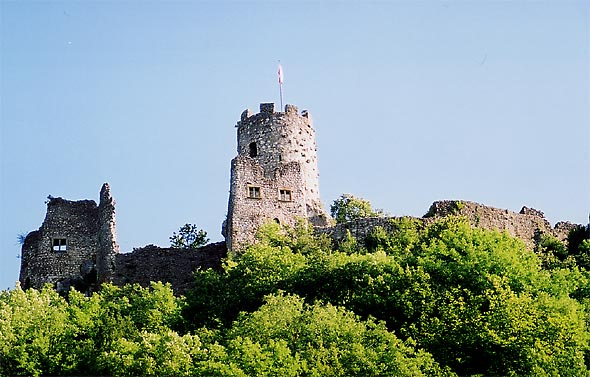
Neu-Falkenstein Castle

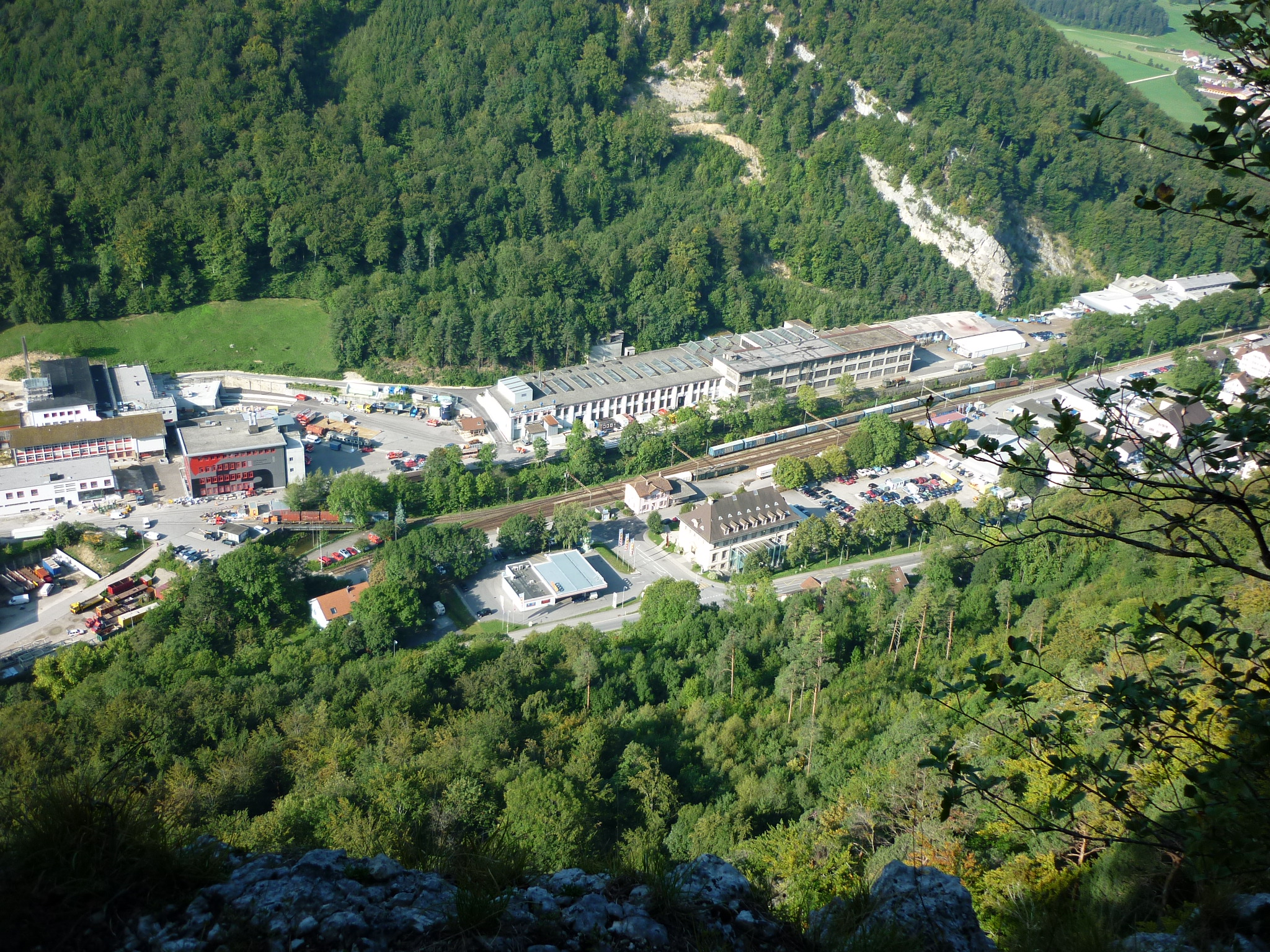
Factory at Klus

== Politics ==
In the 2007 federal election the most popular party was the SVP which received 30.03% of the vote. The next three most popular parties were the CVP (25.91%), the FDP (22.46%) and the SP (13.51%). In the federal election, a total of 1,757 votes were cast, and the voter turnout was 51.8%.

== Economy ==
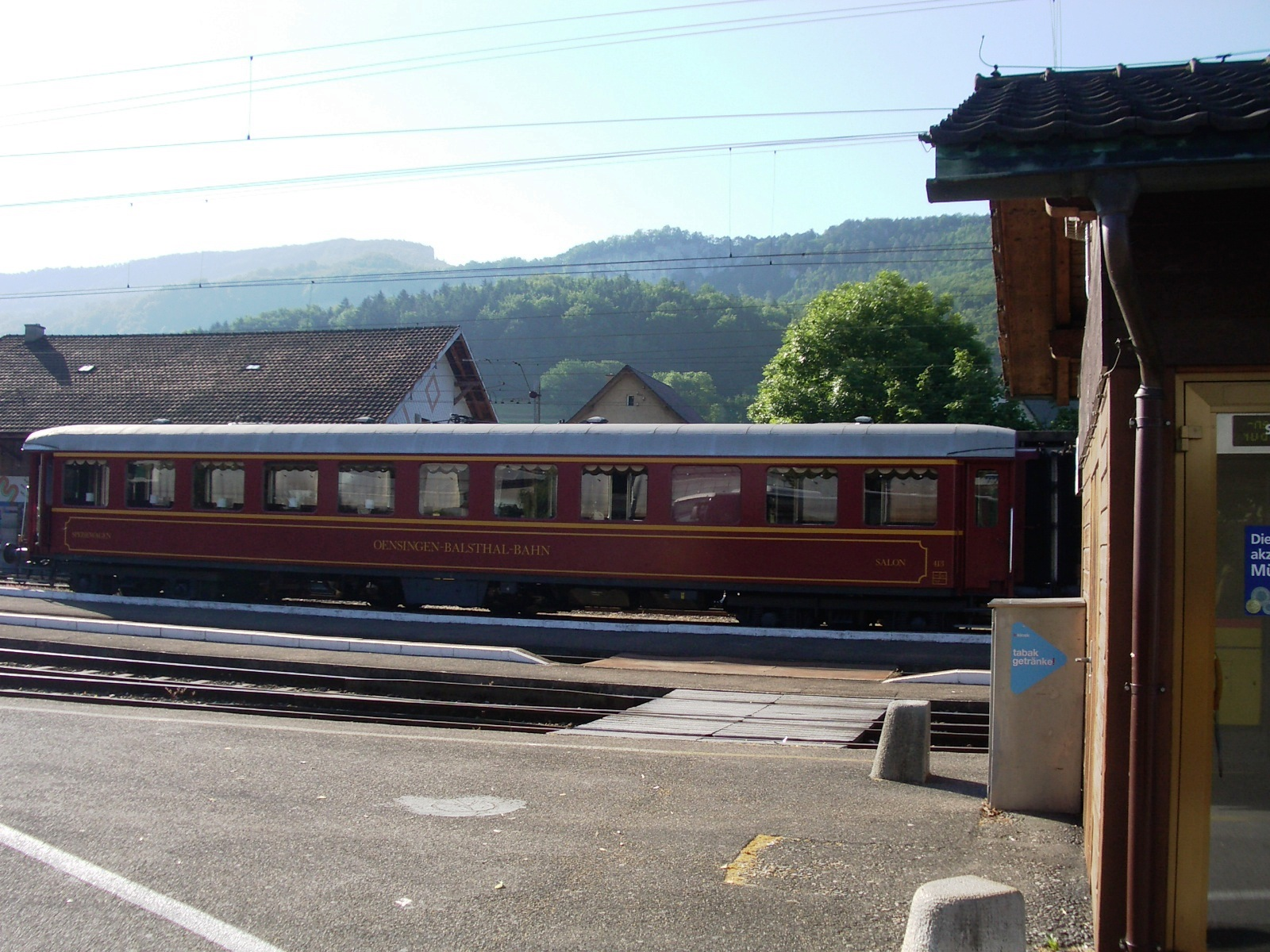
Dining car at Balsthal train station

As of 2010, Balsthal had an unemployment rate of 4.7%. As of 2008, there were 35 people employed in the primary economic sector and about 14 businesses involved in this sector. 1,087 people were employed in the secondary sector and there were 70 businesses in this sector. 1,288 people were employed in the tertiary sector, with 209 businesses in this sector. There were 2,850 residents of the municipality who were employed in some capacity, of which females made up 43.2% of the workforce.

In 2008 the total number of full-time equivalent jobs was 2,054. The number of jobs in the primary sector was 24, of which 21 were in agriculture and 3 were in forestry or lumber production. The number of jobs in the secondary sector was 1,025 of which 804 or (78.4%) were in manufacturing and 215 (21.0%) were in construction. The number of jobs in the tertiary sector was 1,005. In the tertiary sector; 257 or 25.6% were in wholesale or retail sales or the repair of motor vehicles, 100 or 10.0% were in the movement and storage of goods, 88 or 8.8% were in a hotel or restaurant, 8 or 0.8% were in the information industry, 54 or 5.4% were the insurance or financial industry, 89 or 8.9% were technical professionals or scientists, 87 or 8.7% were in education and 160 or 15.9% were in health care.

In 2000, there were 1,350 workers who commuted into the municipality and 1,666 workers who commuted away. The municipality is a net exporter of workers, with about 1.2 workers leaving the municipality for every one entering. About 1.3% of the workforce coming into Balsthal are coming from outside Switzerland. Of the working population, 12.6% used public transportation to get to work, and 59.2% used a private car.

== Religion ==
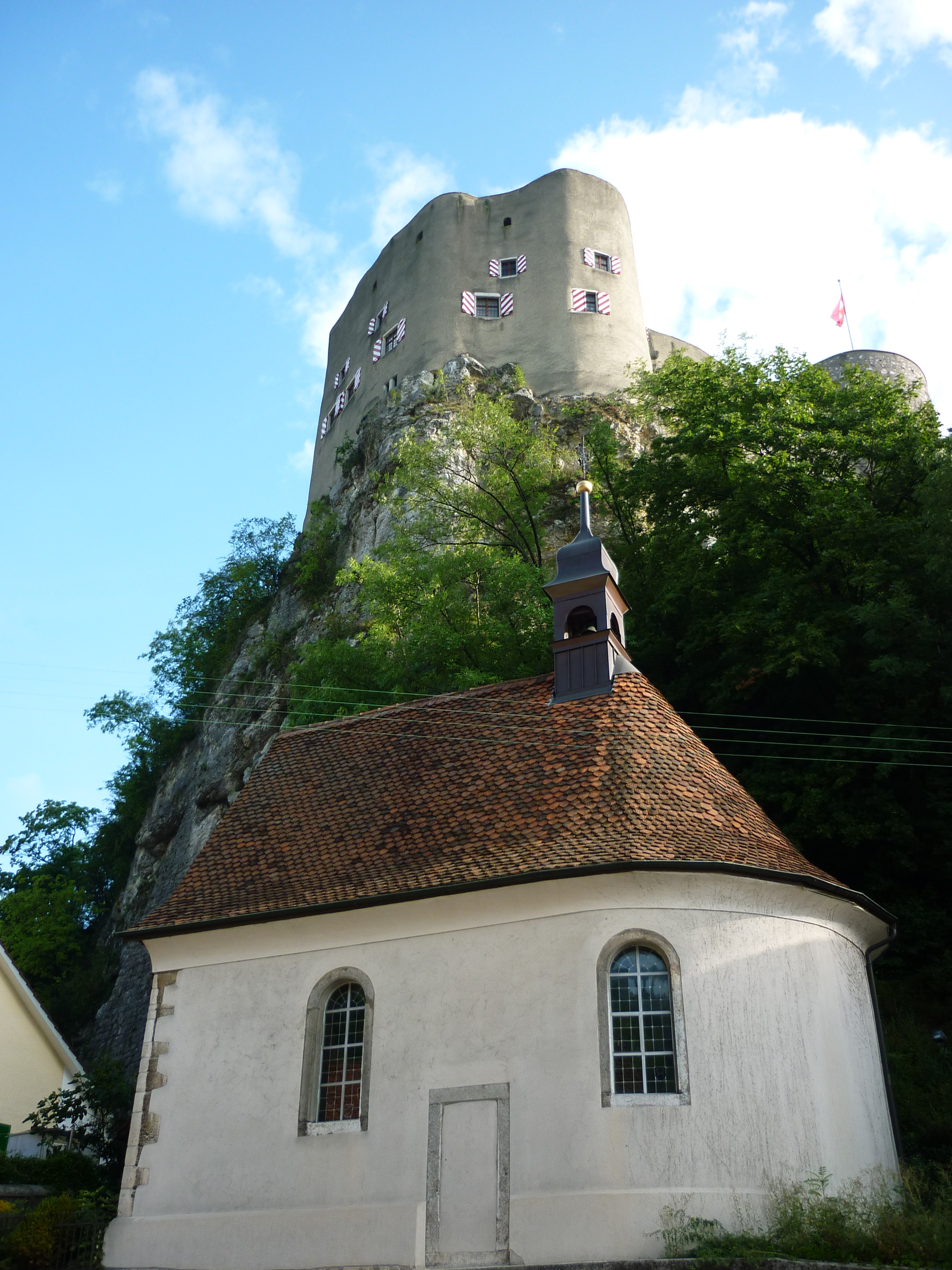
Chapel in Klus

From the 2000 census, 2,950 or 52.9% were Roman Catholic, while 1,115 or 20.0% belonged to the Swiss Reformed Church. Of the rest of the population, there were 154 members of an Orthodox church (or about 2.76% of the population), there were 5 individuals (or about 0.09% of the population) who belonged to the Christian Catholic Church, and there were 79 individuals (or about 1.42% of the population) who belonged to another Christian church. There were 562 (or about 10.08% of the population) who were Islamic. There were 37 individuals who were Buddhist, 4 individuals who were Hindu and 1 individual who belonged to another church. 497 (or about 8.92% of the population) belonged to no church, are agnostic or atheist, and 170 individuals (or about 3.05% of the population) did not answer the question.

== Weather ==
Balsthal has an average of 136.8 days of rain or snow per year and on average receives 1,058 mm (41.7 in) of precipitation. The wettest month is August during which time Balsthal receives an average of 113 mm (4.4 in) of rain or snow. During this month there is precipitation for an average of 11.7 days. The month with the most days of precipitation is May, with an average of 13.5, but with only 99 mm (3.9 in) of rain or snow. The driest month of the year is October with an average of 73 mm (2.9 in) of precipitation over 8.6 days.

== Education ==
In Balsthal about 1,996 or (35.8%) of the population have completed non-mandatory upper secondary education, and 503 or (9.0%) have completed additional higher education (either university or a Fachhochschule). Of the 503 who completed tertiary schooling, 70.2% were Swiss men, 16.9% were Swiss women, 8.2% were non-Swiss men and 4.8% were non-Swiss women.

During the 2010–2011 school year there were a total of 486 students in the Balsthal school system. The education system in the Canton of Solothurn allows young children to attend two years of non-obligatory Kindergarten. During that school year, there were 102 children in kindergarten. The canton's school system requires students to attend six years of primary school, with some of the children attending smaller, specialized classes. In the municipality there were 384 students in primary school. The secondary school program consists of three lower, obligatory years of schooling, followed by three to five years of optional, advanced schools. All the lower secondary students from Balsthal attend their school in a neighboring municipality.

As of 2000, there were 144 students in Balsthal who came from another municipality, while 106 residents attended schools outside the municipality.

Balsthal is home to the Bibliothek Balsthal library. The library has (as of 2008) 6,033 books or other media, and loaned out 11,342 items in the same year. It was open a total of 169 days with average of 8 hours per week during that year.
