= Moosleerau =

- Municipality
- Flag Coat of arms
- Location of Moosleerau
- Location within Switzerland Location within Canton of Aargau
- Coordinates: 47°16′N 8°4′E
- Country: Switzerland
- Canton: Aargau
- District: Zofingen

Area
  - Total: 3.81 km^{2} (1.47 sq mi)
- Elevation: 509 m (1,670 ft)

Population (December 2006)
  - Total: 833
  - Density: 219/km^{2} (566/sq mi)
- Time zone: UTC+01:00 (CET)
  - Summer (DST): UTC+02:00 (CEST)
- Postal code: 5054
- SFOS number: 4277
- ISO 3166 code: CH-AG
- Surrounded by: Attelwil, Kirchleerau, Reitnau, Schmiedrued, Staffelbach, Triengen (LU)
- Website: moosleerau.ch

Moosleerau is a municipality in the district of Zofingen in the canton of Aargau in Switzerland.

== History ==
Aerial view (1954)

Moosleerau is first mentioned in 1243 as Moslerovwa. In 1306 the high court right was held by the Habsburgs. Following the conquest of the Aargau in 1415, the high court right went to Bern. In 1803, after the Act of Mediation created the modern Canton of Aargau, Moosleerau became a municipality in the new Canton.

Moosleerau belongs to the parish of Kirchleerau.

In the 18th Century the village was in the catchment area for the textile industry in Aarau and Zofingen. Several attempts to connect the village to the Suren Valley Railway in the 19th and 20th Centuries failed. Since 1971, the Schöftland-Sursee bus line has reached the municipality. The population decline after 1850 was due to little industrialization in the Suhre River Valley. The population remained stable until World War II when it began to increase.

== Geography ==
Moosleerau has an area, as of 2009, of 3.81 square kilometers (1.47 sq mi). Of this area, 2.31 km^{2} (0.89 sq mi) or 60.6% is used for agricultural purposes, while 1.07 km^{2} (0.41 sq mi) or 28.1% is forested. Of the rest of the land, 0.46 km^{2} (0.18 sq mi) or 12.1% is settled (buildings or roads), 0.01 km^{2} (2.5 acres) or 0.3% is either rivers or lakes.

Of the built up area, industrial buildings made up 1.6% of the total area while housing and buildings made up 6.0% and transportation infrastructure made up 4.5%. Out of the forested land, 26.0% of the total land area is heavily forested and 2.1% is covered with orchards or small clusters of trees. Of the agricultural land, 41.5% is used for growing crops and 17.1% is pastures, while 2.1% is used for orchards or vine crops. All the water in the municipality is flowing water.

The municipality is located in the Zofingen district, on the eastern edge of the Suhre river valley.

== Demographics ==
Moosleerau has a population (as of December 2020) of 915. As of June 2009, 12.6% of the population are foreign nationals. Over the last 10 years (1997–2007) the population has changed at a rate of 1%. Most of the population (as of 2000) speaks German (92.0%), with Albanian being second most common ( 2.5%) and Italian being third ( 2.1%).

The age distribution, as of 2008, in Moosleerau is; 100 children or 12.1% of the population are between 0 and 9 years old and 108 teenagers or 13.1% are between 10 and 19. Of the adult population, 117 people or 14.2% of the population are between 20 and 29 years old. 108 people or 13.1% are between 30 and 39, 122 people or 14.8% are between 40 and 49, and 111 people or 13.4% are between 50 and 59. The senior population distribution is 82 people or 9.9% of the population are between 60 and 69 years old, 47 people or 5.7% are between 70 and 79, there are 28 people or 3.4% who are between 80 and 89, and there are 3 people or 0.4% who are 90 and older.

As of 2000, there were 26 homes with 1 or 2 persons in the household, 136 homes with 3 or 4 persons in the household, and 136 homes with 5 or more persons in the household. As of 2000, there were 303 private households (homes and apartments) in the municipality, and an average of 2.6 persons per household. In 2008 there were 166 single family homes (or 49.1% of the total) out of a total of 338 homes and apartments. There were a total of 4 empty apartments for a 1.2% vacancy rate. As of 2007, the construction rate of new housing units was 2.4 new units per 1000 residents.

In the 2007 federal election the most popular party was the SVP which received 43.78% of the vote. The next three most popular parties were the SP (13.71%), the FDP (12.36%) and the Green Party (9.2%). In the federal election, a total of 270 votes were cast, and the voter turnout was 47.4%.

The historical population is given in the following table:

Historical population
Year	Pop.	±%
1764	298	—
1850	646	+116.8%
1900	452	−30.0%
1920	414	−8.4%
1950	531	+28.3%
2000	798	+50.3%

== Economy ==
As of 2007, Moosleerau had an unemployment rate of 1.46%. As of 2005, there were 33 people employed in the primary economic sector and about 15 businesses involved in this sector. 117 people are employed in the secondary sector and there are 10 businesses in this sector. 129 people are employed in the tertiary sector, with 21 businesses in this sector.

In 2000 there were 414 workers who lived in the municipality. Of these, 303 or about 73.2% of the residents worked outside Moosleerau while 117 people commuted into the municipality for work. There were a total of 228 jobs (of at least 6 hours per week) in the municipality. Of the working population, 7% used public transportation to get to work, and 55.2% used a private car.

== Religion ==
From the 2000 census, 204 or 25.6% were Roman Catholic, while 490 or 61.4% belonged to the Swiss Reformed Church. Of the rest of the population, there was 1 individual who belonged to the Christian Catholic faith.

== Education ==
In Moosleerau about 68.8% of the population (between age 25–64) have completed either non-mandatory upper secondary education or additional higher education (either university or a Fachhochschule). Of the school age population (in the 2008/2009 school year), there are 69 students attending primary school in the municipality.
