= Reitnau =

- Municipality
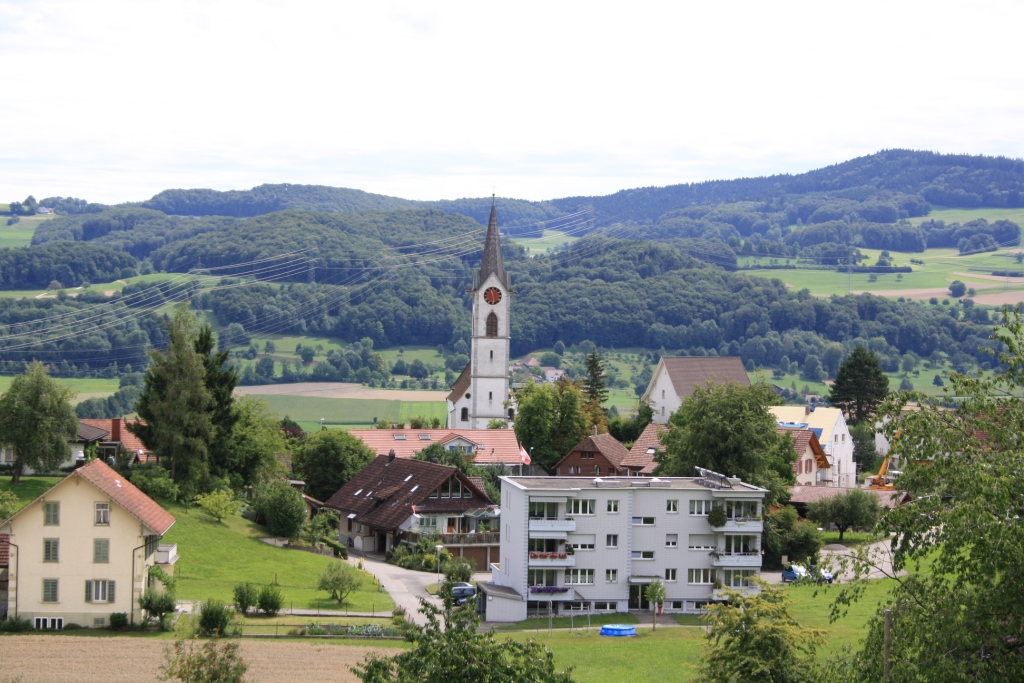

- Flag Coat of arms
- Location of Reitnau
- Location within Switzerland Location within Canton of Aargau
- Coordinates: 47°15′N 8°3′E
- Country: Switzerland
- Canton: Aargau
- District: Zofingen

Area
  - Total: 5.81 km^{2} (2.24 sq mi)
- Elevation: 524 m (1,719 ft)

Population (December 2006)
  - Total: 1,168
  - Density: 201/km^{2} (521/sq mi)
- Time zone: UTC+01:00 (CET)
  - Summer (DST): UTC+02:00 (CEST)
- Postal code: 5057
- SFOS number: 4281
- ISO 3166 code: CH-AG
- Surrounded by: Attelwil, Moosleerau, Reiden (LU), Triengen (LU), Wikon (LU), Wiliberg, Winikon (LU)
- Website: www.reitnau.ch

Reitnau (Swiss Standard German pronunciation: [ˈraɪtnaʊ]; High Alemannic: Reitnou) is a municipality in the district of Zofingen in the canton of Aargau in Switzerland. On 1 January 2019 the former municipality of Attelwil merged into the municipality of Reitnau.

== History ==
Aerial view (1953)

Reitnau is first mentioned in 1045 as Reitinouwa. The village was originally owned by the Count of Lenzburg, though in 1045 it and the village church were granted to the convent in Schänis. The property was administered by a representative of the convent. Following the conquest of the Aargau in 1415, the village belonged to Bern and was part of the bailiwick of Lenzburg. However, the low court for Reitnau continued to be held in Schänis. It remained part of Bern until 1798 and in 1803 became a municipality in the new canton of Aargau. In 1873 the municipality opened its first schoolhouse, and in 1905, it received a district school.

The church's administration was transferred in 1807 from the convent in Schänis into private hands, and was taken over in 1850 by the District. A church existed in the village before 900, though the present building dates from about 1522.

Until the 19th Century the village was dominated by agriculture. In the 18th Century home cloth weaving brought another source of income. Between 1900-33 there was a Bally Shoe factory. Around 1990 it became part of the agglomerations of Zofingen and Aarau. In 2005, the manufacturing sector provided 35% of the jobs, while the services sector provided 41%.

== Geography ==
Reitnau has an area, as of 2009, of 5.81 square kilometers (2.24 sq mi). Of this area, 3.01 km^{2} (1.16 sq mi) or 51.8% is used for agricultural purposes, while 2.08 km^{2} (0.80 sq mi) or 35.8% is forested. Of the rest of the land, 0.68 km^{2} (0.26 sq mi) or 11.7% is settled (buildings or roads), 0.02 km^{2} (4.9 acres) or 0.3% is either rivers or lakes.

Of the built up area, housing and buildings made up 7.6% and transportation infrastructure made up 3.1%. Out of the forested land, 33.7% of the total land area is heavily forested and 2.1% is covered with orchards or small clusters of trees. Of the agricultural land, 32.7% is used for growing crops and 15.0% is pastures, while 4.1% is used for orchards or vine crops. All the water in the municipality is flowing water.

The municipality is located in the Zofingen district, on the western edge of the Suhre river valley. Its southern border is shared with the Canton of Lucerne. It consists of the village of Reitnau.

== Coat of arms ==
The blazon of the municipal coat of arms is Azure a Heron Argent beaked and membered Gules statant on Coupeaux Vert. This may be an example of canting with the heron (German: Reiher) representing the municipality's name."

== Demographics ==
Reitnau has a population (as of December 2020) of 1,519. As of June 2009, 7.0% of the population are foreign nationals. Over the last 10 years (1997–2007) the population has changed at a rate of 3%. Most of the population (as of 2000) speaks German (93.9%), with Albanian being second most common ( 1.5%) and Italian being third ( 0.5%).

The age distribution, as of 2008, in Reitnau is; 150 children or 12.7% of the population are between 0 and 9 years old and 164 teenagers or 13.8% are between 10 and 19. Of the adult population, 142 people or 12.0% of the population are between 20 and 29 years old. 154 people or 13.0% are between 30 and 39, 227 people or 19.2% are between 40 and 49, and 129 people or 10.9% are between 50 and 59. The senior population distribution is 101 people or 8.5% of the population are between 60 and 69 years old, 78 people or 6.6% are between 70 and 79, there are 34 people or 2.9% who are between 80 and 89, and there are 6 people or 0.5% who are 90 and older.

As of 2000, there were 33 homes with 1 or 2 persons in the household, 164 homes with 3 or 4 persons in the household, and 192 homes with 5 or more persons in the household. As of 2000, there were 431 private households (homes and apartments) in the municipality, and an average of 2.6 persons per household. In 2008 there were 180 single family homes (or 39.4% of the total) out of a total of 457 homes and apartments. There were a total of 0 empty apartments for a 0.0% vacancy rate. As of 2007, the construction rate of new housing units was 0.9 new units per 1000 residents.

In the 2007 federal election the most popular party was the SVP which received 43.9% of the vote. The next three most popular parties were the EVP Party (16.75%), the Green Party (11.68%) and the SP (9.69%). In the federal election, a total of 421 votes were cast, and the voter turnout was 49.0%.

The historical population is given in the following table:

Historical population
Year	Pop.	±%
1764	461	—
1850	1,082	+134.7%
1900	812	−25.0%
1950	915	+12.7%
1990	904	−1.2%
2000	1,143	+26.4%

== Economy ==
As of 2007, Reitnau had an unemployment rate of 1.43%. As of 2005, there were 84 people employed in the primary economic sector and about 31 businesses involved in this sector. 125 people are employed in the secondary sector and there are 17 businesses in this sector. 144 people are employed in the tertiary sector, with 32 businesses in this sector.

In 2000 there were 585 workers who lived in the municipality. Of these, 428 or about 73.2% of the residents worked outside Reitnau while 133 people commuted into the municipality for work. There were a total of 290 jobs (of at least 6 hours per week) in the municipality. Of the working population, 6.4% used public transportation to get to work, and 58.9% used a private car.

== Religion ==
From the 2000 census, 196 or 17.1% were Roman Catholic, while 830 or 72.6% belonged to the Swiss Reformed Church. Of the rest of the population, there was 1 individual who belonged to the Christian Catholic faith.

== Education ==
In Reitnau about 72.3% of the population (between age 25-64) have completed either non-mandatory upper secondary education or additional higher education (either university or a Fachhochschule). Of the school age population (in the 2008/2009 school year), there are 134 students attending primary school, there are 62 students attending secondary school in the municipality.
