= Zofingen District =

Coordinates: 47°17′N 7°56′E

Zofingen District Bezirk Zofingen
- District
- Country: Switzerland
- Canton: Aargau
- Capital: Zofingen

Area
  - Total: 142.01 km^{2} (54.83 sq mi)

Population (2020)
  - Total: 73,843
  - Density: 519.98/km^{2} (1,346.8/sq mi)
- Time zone: UTC+1 (CET)
  - Summer (DST): UTC+2 (CEST)
- Municipalities: 17

Zofingen District is a district in the Swiss canton of Aargau. It is located in the southwest corner of the Canton. The seat is Zofingen. The largest municipality in population is Oftringen, the smallest is Wiliberg. It has a population of 73,843 (as of 31 December 2020).

== Geography ==
Bezirk Zofingen has an area, as of 2009, of 141.97 square kilometers (54.81 sq mi). Of this area, 55.93 km^{2} (21.59 sq mi) or 39.4% is used for agricultural purposes, while 61.82 km^{2} (23.87 sq mi) or 43.5% is forested. Of the rest of the land, 23.43 km^{2} (9.05 sq mi) or 16.5% is settled (buildings or roads).

== Demographics ==
Zofingen district has a population (as of December 2020) of 73,843. As of June 2009, 20.4% of the population are foreign nationals.

== Economy ==
In 2000 there were 30,570 workers who lived in the district. Of these, 21,580 or about 70.6% of the residents worked outside the Zofingen district while 16,514 people commuted into the district for work. There were a total of 25,504 jobs (of at least 6 hours per week) in the district.

== Religion ==
From the 2000 census, 15,245 or 26.2% were Roman Catholic, while 31,061 or 53.3% belonged to the Swiss Reformed Church. Of the rest of the population, there were 130 individuals (or about 0.22% of the population) who belonged to the Christian Catholic faith.

== Education ==
Of the school age population (in the 2008/2009 school year), there are 4,351 students attending primary school, there are 1,689 students attending secondary school, there are 1,062 students attending tertiary or university level schooling, and there are 9 students who are seeking a job after school in the municipality.

== Municipalities ==
Coat of arms	Municipality	Population (31 December 2020)	Area, km^{2}
Aarburg	Aarburg	8,577	4.42
Bottenwil	Bottenwil	823	5.1
Brittnau	Brittnau	3,968	13.69
Kirchleerau	Kirchleerau	898	4.36
Kölliken	Kölliken	4,559	8.89
Moosleerau	Moosleerau	915	3.81
Murgenthal	Murgenthal	2,959	18.65
Oftringen	Oftringen	14,455	12.85
Reitnau	Reitnau	1,519	5.81
Rothrist	Rothrist	9,290	11.84
Safenwil	Safenwil	4,107	5.99
Staffelbach	Staffelbach	1,309	8.94
Strengelbach	Strengelbach	4,859	6.01
Uerkheim	Uerkheim	1,342	7.1
Vordemwald	Vordemwald	1,992	10.13
Wiliberg	Wiliberg	167	1.17
Zofingen	Zofingen	12,104	11.09

=== Mergers ===
The following changes to the district's municipalities have occurred since 2000:

- 2002: Mühlethal merged into Zofingen
- 2019: Attelwil merged into Reitnau
