= Bottenwil =

- Municipality
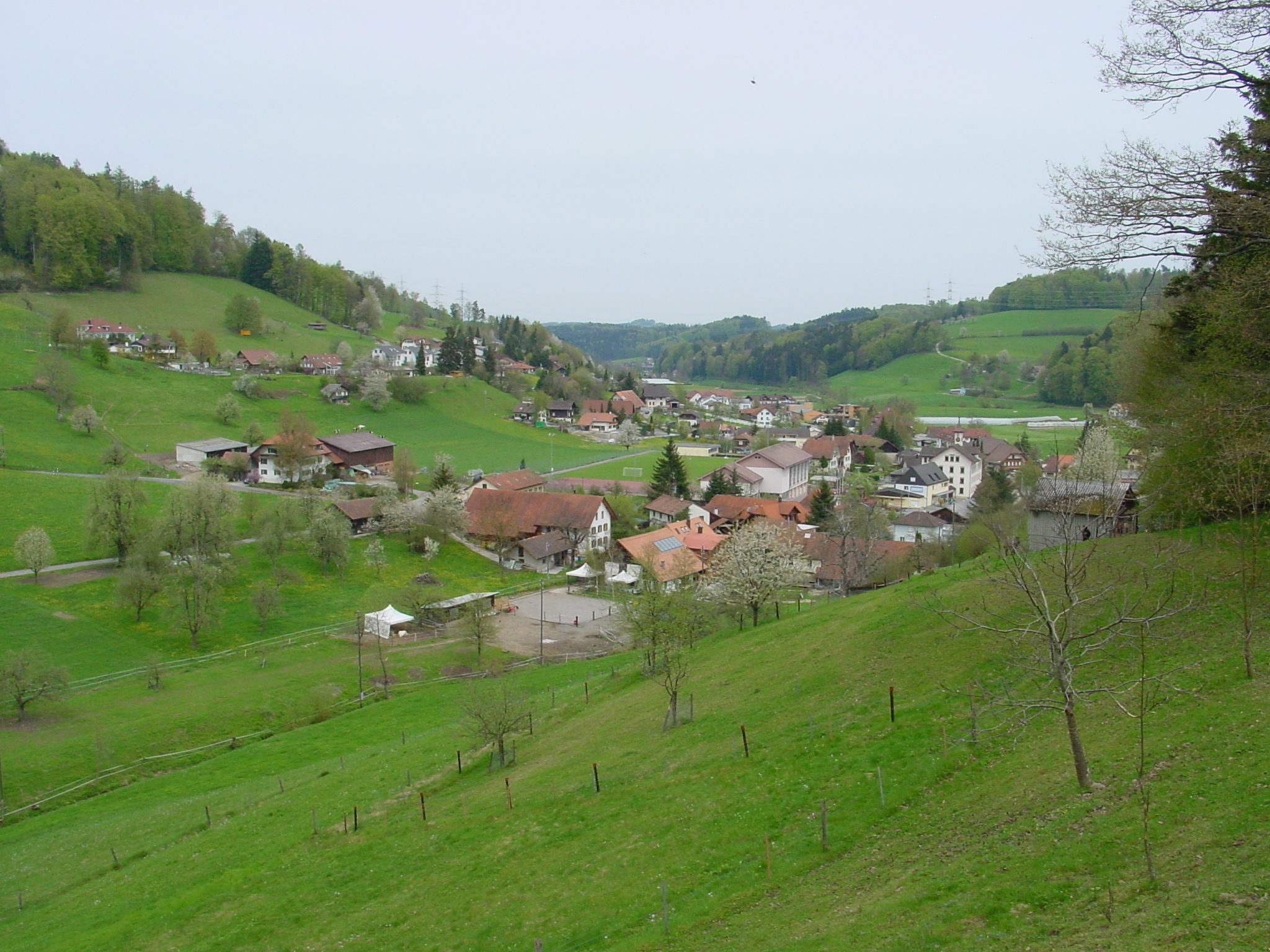

- Flag Coat of arms
- Location of Bottenwil
- Location within Switzerland Location within Canton of Aargau
- Coordinates: 47°17′N 8°0′E
- Country: Switzerland
- Canton: Aargau
- District: Zofingen

Area
  - Total: 5.10 km^{2} (1.97 sq mi)
- Elevation: 493 m (1,617 ft)

Population (December 2020)
  - Total: 823
  - Density: 161/km^{2} (418/sq mi)
- Time zone: UTC+01:00 (CET)
  - Summer (DST): UTC+02:00 (CEST)
- Postal code: 4814
- SFOS number: 4273
- ISO 3166 code: CH-AG
- Surrounded by: Staffelbach, Uerkheim, Wikon (LU), Wiliberg, Zofingen
- Website: www.bottenwil.ch

Bottenwil is a municipality in the district of Zofingen in the canton of Aargau in Switzerland.

Aerial view (1970)

== History ==
Bottenwil is first mentioned in 1189 as Botanwile.

== Geography ==
Bottenwil has an area, as of 2009, of 5.1 square kilometers (2.0 sq mi). Of this area, 2.47 km^{2} (0.95 sq mi) or 48.4% is used for agricultural purposes, while 2.16 km^{2} (0.83 sq mi) or 42.4% is forested. Of the rest of the land, 0.45 km^{2} (0.17 sq mi) or 8.8% is settled (buildings or roads), 0.02 km^{2} (4.9 acres) or 0.4% is either rivers or lakes.

Of the built up area, housing and buildings made up 5.1% and transportation infrastructure made up 2.5%. Out of the forested land, 39.8% of the total land area is heavily forested and 2.5% is covered with orchards or small clusters of trees. Of the agricultural land, 15.7% is used for growing crops and 30.8% is pastures, while 2.0% is used for orchards or vine crops. All the water in the municipality is flowing water.

The municipality is located in the Zofingen district, in the upper Uerkental. It consists of the linear village of Bottenwil.

== Coat of arms ==
The blazon of the municipal coat of arms is Gules a Pine Tree Vert issuant from a Wall Argent masoned embattled issuant from base.

== Demographics ==
Bottenwil has a population (as of December 2020) of 823. As of June 2009, 7.3% of the population are foreign nationals. Over the last 10 years (1997–2007) the population has changed at a rate of 0.4%. Most of the population (as of 2000) speaks German (98.2%), with Italian being second most common ( 0.5%) and French being third ( 0.3%).

The age distribution, as of 2008, in Bottenwil is; 71 children or 8.9% of the population are between 0 and 9 years old and 109 teenagers or 13.7% are between 10 and 19. Of the adult population, 91 people or 11.5% of the population are between 20 and 29 years old. 112 people or 14.1% are between 30 and 39, 122 people or 15.4% are between 40 and 49, and 131 people or 16.5% are between 50 and 59. The senior population distribution is 80 people or 10.1% of the population are between 60 and 69 years old, 55 people or 6.9% are between 70 and 79, there are 22 people or 2.8% who are between 80 and 89, and there is 1 person who is 90 or older.

As of 2000 the average number of residents per living room was 0.56 which is about equal to the cantonal average of 0.57 per room. In this case, a room is defined as space of a housing unit of at least 4 m^{2} (43 sq ft) as normal bedrooms, dining rooms, living rooms, kitchens and habitable cellars and attics. About 62% of the total households were owner occupied, or in other words did not pay rent (though they may have a mortgage or a rent-to-own agreement).

As of 2000, there were 23 homes with 1 or 2 persons in the household, 124 homes with 3 or 4 persons in the household, and 153 homes with 5 or more persons in the household. As of 2000, there were 307 private households (homes and apartments) in the municipality, and an average of 2.6 persons per household. In 2008 there were 156 single family homes (or 45.6% of the total) out of a total of 342 homes and apartments. There were a total of 0 empty apartments for a 0.0% vacancy rate. As of 2007, the construction rate of new housing units was 3.8 new units per 1000 residents.

In the 2007 federal election the most popular party was the SVP which received 41.32% of the vote. The next three most popular parties were the SP (13.92%), the FDP (11.39%) and the EVP Party (9.93%). In the federal election, a total of 285 votes were cast, and the voter turnout was 46.6%.

The historical population is given in the following table:

Historical population
Year	Pop.	±%
1798	556	—
1850	960	+72.7%
1900	762	−20.6%
1950	706	−7.3%
1980	660	−6.5%
2000	799	+21.1%

== Economy ==
As of 2007, Bottenwil had an unemployment rate of 1.11%. As of 2005, there were 45 people employed in the primary economic sector and about 21 businesses involved in this sector. 86 people are employed in the secondary sector and there are 16 businesses in this sector. 34 people are employed in the tertiary sector, with 15 businesses in this sector.

In 2000 there were 442 workers who lived in the municipality. Of these, 335 or about 75.8% of the residents worked outside Bottenwil while 95 people commuted into the municipality for work. There were a total of 202 jobs (of at least 6 hours per week) in the municipality. Of the working population, 6.8% used public transportation to get to work, and 61.2% used a private car.

== Religion ==
From the 2000 census, 115 or 14.4% were Roman Catholic, while 554 or 69.3% belonged to the Swiss Reformed Church. Of the rest of the population, there were 2 individuals (or about 0.25% of the population) who belonged to the Christian Catholic faith.

== Education ==
The entire Swiss population is generally well educated. In Bottenwil about 79% of the population (between age 25-64) have completed either non-mandatory upper secondary education or additional higher education (either university or a Fachhochschule). Of the school age population (in the 2008/2009 school year), there are 58 students attending primary school in the municipality.
