= Wikon =

- Municipality
- Coat of arms
- Location of Wikon
- Location within Switzerland Location within Canton of Lucerne
- Coordinates: 47°16′N 7°58′E
- Country: Switzerland
- Canton: Lucerne
- District: Willisau

Area
  - Total: 8.28 km^{2} (3.20 sq mi)
- Elevation: 460 m (1,510 ft)

Population (December 2020)
  - Total: 1,495
  - Density: 181/km^{2} (468/sq mi)
- Time zone: UTC+01:00 (CET)
  - Summer (DST): UTC+02:00 (CEST)
- Postal code: 4806
- SFOS number: 1147
- ISO 3166 code: CH-LU
- Surrounded by: Bottenwil (AG), Brittnau (AG), Reiden, Reitnau (AG), Wiliberg (AG), Zofingen (AG)
- Website: www.wikon.ch

Wikon is a municipality in the district of Willisau in the canton of Lucerne in Switzerland.

== Geography ==
Wikon has an area, as of 2006, of 8.3 km^{2} (3.2 sq mi). Of this area, 39.4% is used for agricultural purposes, while 51.6% is forested. Of the rest of the land, 8.8% is settled (buildings or roads) and the remainder (0.1%) is non-productive rivers. In the 1997 land survey, 51.57% of the total land area was forested. Of the agricultural land, 37.44% is used for farming or pastures, while 2.05% is used for orchards or vine crops. Of the settled areas, 4.95% is covered with buildings, 1.33% is industrial, and 2.54% is transportation infrastructure.

== Demographics ==
Wikon has a population (as of 31 December 2020) of 1,495. As of 2007, 172 or about 12.8% are not Swiss citizens. Over the last 10 years the population has decreased at a rate of -2.3%. Most of the population (as of 2000) speaks German (90.4%), with Albanian being second most common ( 3.3%) and Serbo-Croatian being third ( 1.9%).

In the 2007 election the most popular party was the SVP which received 30.5% of the vote. The next three most popular parties were the CVP (24.3%), the FDP (20.3%) and the SPS (15.6%).

The age distribution, as of 2008, in Wikon is; 296 people or 21.9% of the population is 0–19 years old. 354 people or 26.2% are 20–39 years old, and 462 people or 34.2% are 40–64 years old. The senior population distribution is 169 people or 12.5% are 65–79 years old, 61 or 4.5% are 80–89 years old and 7 people or 0.5% of the population are 90+ years old.

In Wikon about 66.2% of the population (between age 25-64) have completed either non-mandatory upper secondary education or additional higher education (either university or a Fachhochschule).

As of 2000 there are 514 households, of which 159 households (or about 30.9%) contain only a single individual. 54 or about 10.5% are large households, with at least five members. As of 2000 there were 286 inhabited buildings in the municipality, of which 221 were built only as housing, and 65 were mixed use buildings. There were 166 single family homes, 26 double family homes, and 29 multi-family homes in the municipality. Most homes were either two (160) or three (32) story structures. There were only 18 single story buildings and 11 four or more story buildings.

Wikon has an unemployment rate of 2.54%. As of 2005, there were 78 people employed in the primary economic sector and about 24 businesses involved in this sector. 509 people are employed in the secondary sector and there are 10 businesses in this sector. 174 people are employed in the tertiary sector, with 35 businesses in this sector. As of 2000 50.6% of the population of the municipality were employed in some capacity. At the same time, females made up 41.7% of the workforce.

In the 2000 census the religious membership of Wikon was; 702 (52.3%) were Roman Catholic, and 459 (34.2%) were Protestant, with an additional 37 (2.76%) that were of some other Christian faith. There are 43 individuals (3.2% of the population) who are Muslim. Of the rest; there were 1 (0.07%) individuals who belong to another religion (not listed), 89 (6.63%) who do not belong to any organized religion, 11 (0.82%) who did not answer the question.
