= Oftringen =

Municipality in Switzerland

- Municipality
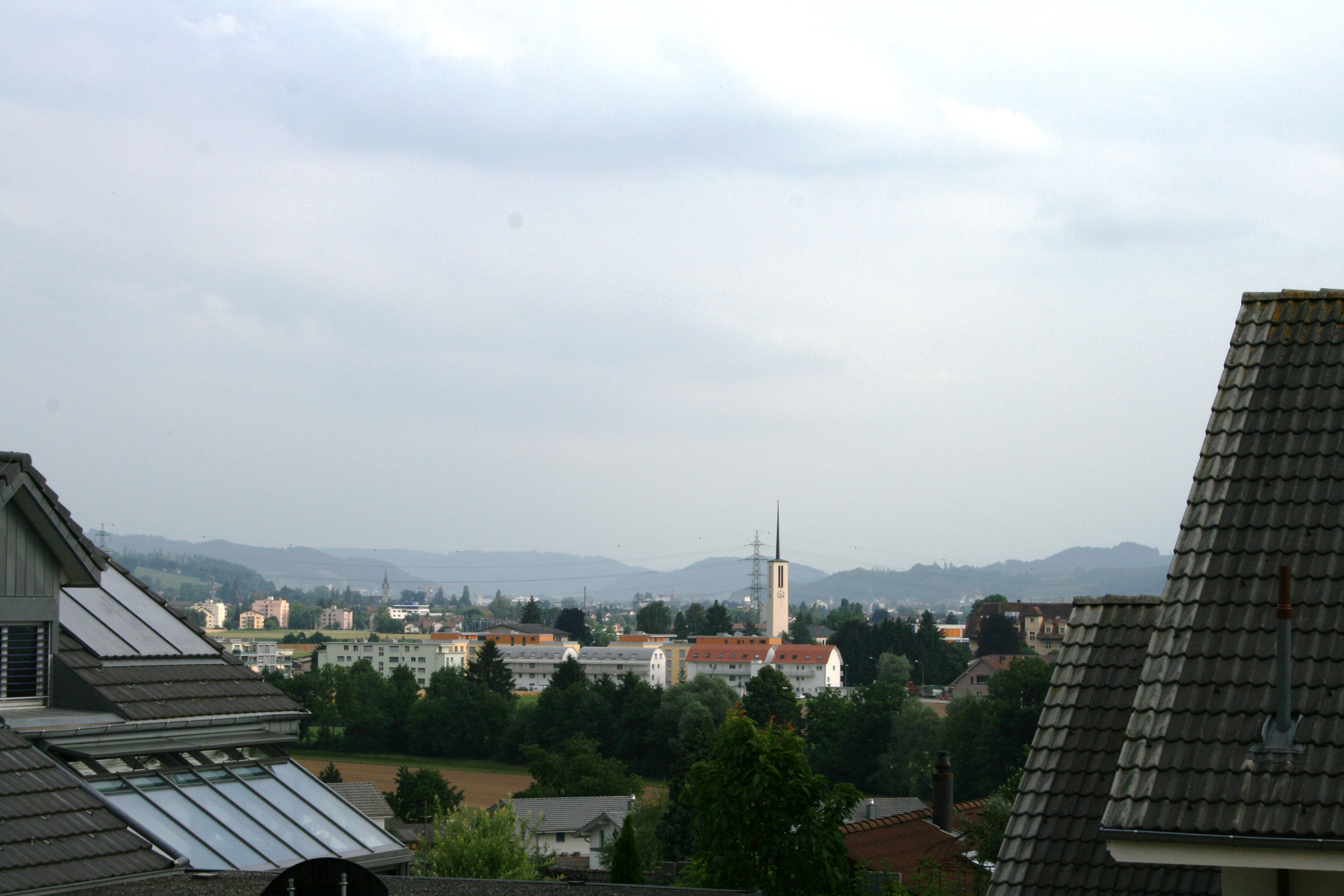

- Flag Coat of arms
- Location of Oftringen
- Location within Switzerland Location within Canton of Aargau
- Coordinates: 47°19′N 7°55′E
- Country: Switzerland
- Canton: Aargau
- District: Zofingen

Area
  - Total: 12.85 km^{2} (4.96 sq mi)
- Elevation: 419 m (1,375 ft)

Population (December 2006)
  - Total: 10,965
  - Density: 853.3/km^{2} (2,210/sq mi)
- Time zone: UTC+01:00 (CET)
  - Summer (DST): UTC+02:00 (CEST)
- Postal code: 4665
- SFOS number: 4280
- ISO 3166 code: CH-AG
- Surrounded by: Aarburg, Dulliken (SO), Rothrist, Safenwil, Starrkirch-Wil (SO), Strengelbach, Walterswil (SO), Zofingen
- Twin towns: Filet (Switzerland)
- Website: oftringen.ch

Oftringen is a municipality in the district of Zofingen in the canton of Aargau in Switzerland.

== History ==
Aerial view (1967)

The earliest trace of human habitation near Oftringen is scattered mesolithic era finds. A Roman era farm at the intersection of two roads and scattered Alamanni settlements have also been found. The modern municipality of Oftringen is first mentioned in 924 as Ofteringa. The village was under the Herschaft of the Counts of Frohburg from the Middle Ages until 1299, when they came under Habsburg authority. Following the Bernese conquest of the Aargau in 1415 it belonged to the Amt or township of Aarburg. It remained part of Bern until 1798. Under the guidance of Bern, in 1528 the Protestant Reformation entered the village. In 1667 an ecclesiastical court was set up in the village. In 1663 the first schoolhouse was built, and in 1740 a second one was added in the hamlet of Küngoldingen. The district school was built in 1969–70.

It was part of the parish of Zofingen until 1920 when its own parish was formed. The parish church was built in 1933–34.

Since the expansion of Bernese road networks in the 18th century the Bern-Zurich and Basel-Lucerne roads cross in Oftringen. In addition, since 1856 the town is on the Olten-Lucerne railway, though the station is located in Aarburg. The Aarau-Zofingen railway line was built in 1875-77 by the Swiss Federal Railways. In 1914 a station at Küngoldingen was added.

The center of the settlement shifted to around the intersection of the Bern-Zurich and Basel-Lucerne roads as various businesses sprang up to take advantage of the increased traffic. Industrialization began in 1825 with the establishment of a paper mill, which was followed by textile plants along the river. In the 20th century the chemical and metal industries entered the village. In 1920 about 65% of the workers worked in industry. After the construction of the national motorway junction (A1 and A2 motorways) in Oftringen in 1967 and 1980, several shopping centers and other service businesses settled in the municipality. The number of jobs increased between 1950 and 1990 from 1,430 to 3,233. At the beginning of the 21st century, agriculture only provided 4% of the jobs, while services provided over 60%. Between 1945 and 1970 the population grew so quickly that in the 1970s Oftringen had the highest population in the Zofingen agglomeration.

== Geography ==
Oftringen has an area, as of 2009, of 12.85 square kilometers (4.96 sq mi). Of this area, 4.57 km^{2} (1.76 sq mi) or 35.6% is used for agricultural purposes, while 4.35 km^{2} (1.68 sq mi) or 33.9% is forested. Of the rest of the land, 3.94 km^{2} (1.52 sq mi) or 30.7% is settled (buildings or roads) and 0.01 km^{2} (2.5 acres) or 0.1% is unproductive land.

Of the built up area, industrial buildings made up 5.0% of the total area while housing and buildings made up 15.4% and transportation infrastructure made up 6.1%. Power and water infrastructure as well as other special developed areas made up 2.9% of the area while parks, green belts and sports fields made up 1.3%. Out of the forested land, 32.1% of the total land area is heavily forested and 1.7% is covered with orchards or small clusters of trees. Of the agricultural land, 19.1% is used for growing crops and 13.5% is pastures, while 3.0% is used for orchards or vine crops.

The municipality is located in the Zofingen district, on the eastern side of the lower Wigger river valley. It consists of the village of Oftringen and several hamlets and individual houses scattered throughout side valleys. The ruins of Alt-Wartburg castle are located in the northernmost part of the municipality.

== Coat of arms ==
The blazon of the municipal coat of arms is Azure three Crescents Argent.

== Demographics ==
Oftringen has a population (as of December 2020) of 14,455. As of June 2009, 30.9% of the population are foreign nationals. Over the last 10 years (1997–2007) the population has changed at a rate of 12.4%. Most of the population (as of 2000) speaks German (81.4%), with Italian being second most common ( 5.4%) and Serbo-Croatian being third ( 3.7%).

The age distribution, as of 2008, in Oftringen is; 1,146 children or 9.7% of the population are between 0 and 9 years old and 1,293 teenagers or 11.0% are between 10 and 19. Of the adult population, 1,754 people or 14.9% of the population are between 20 and 29 years old. 1,720 people or 14.6% are between 30 and 39, 1,940 people or 16.5% are between 40 and 49, and 1,567 people or 13.3% are between 50 and 59. The senior population distribution is 1,145 people or 9.7% of the population are between 60 and 69 years old, 782 people or 6.6% are between 70 and 79, there are 374 people or 3.2% who are between 80 and 89, and there are 61 people or 0.5% who are 90 and older.

As of 2000 the average number of residents per living room was 0.59 which is about equal to the cantonal average of 0.57 per room. In this case, a room is defined as space of a housing unit of at least 4 m^{2} (43 sq ft) as normal bedrooms, dining rooms, living rooms, kitchens and habitable cellars and attics. About 36.3% of the total households were owner occupied, or in other words did not pay rent (though they may have a mortgage or a rent-to-own agreement).

As of 2000, there were 564 homes with 1 or 2 persons in the household, 2,571 homes with 3 or 4 persons in the household, and 1,152 homes with 5 or more persons in the household. As of 2000, there were 4,364 private households (homes and apartments) in the municipality, and an average of 2.3 persons per household. In 2008 there were 1,438 single family homes (or 25.9% of the total) out of a total of 5,548 homes and apartments. There were a total of 159 empty apartments for a 2.9% vacancy rate. As of 2007, the construction rate of new housing units was 18.1 new units per 1000 residents.

In the 2007 federal election the most popular party was the SVP which received 37.49% of the vote. The next two most popular parties were the SP (20.01%), and the FDP (12.9%) . In the federal election, a total of 2,448 votes were cast, and the voter turnout was 37.2%.

The historical population is given in the following table:

Historical population
Year	Pop.	±%
1764	884	—
1850	2,584	+192.3%
1900	3,247	+25.7%
1950	5,350	+64.8%
1970	9,189	+71.8%
2000	10,305	+12.1%

== Heritage sites of national significance ==
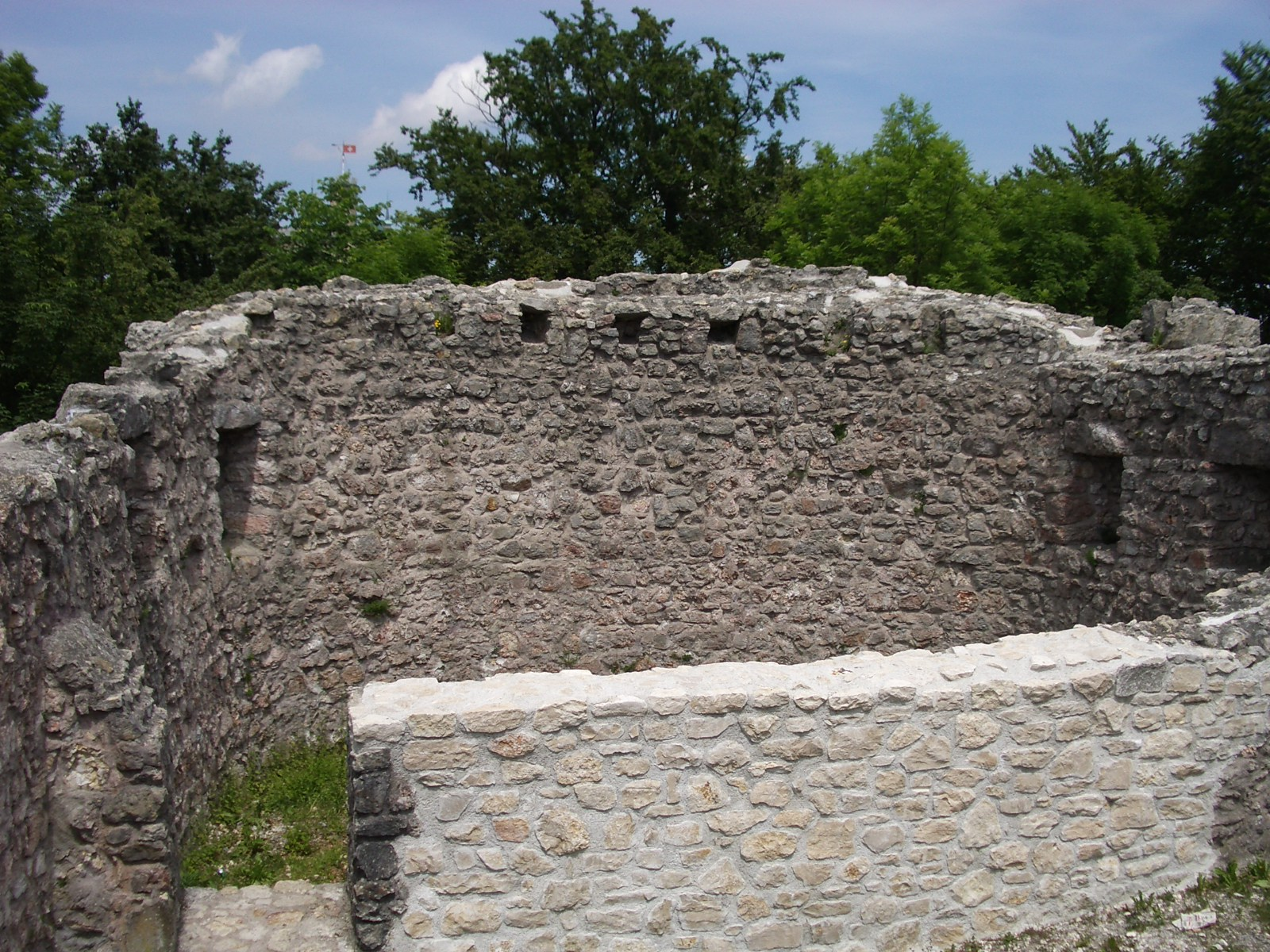
Alt-Wartburg castle

The ruins of Alt-Wartburg castle are listed as a Swiss heritage site of national significance.

== Economy ==
As of 2007, Oftringen had an unemployment rate of 3.52%. As of 2005, there were 139 people employed in the primary economic sector and about 39 businesses involved in this sector. 1,529 people are employed in the secondary sector and there are 97 businesses in this sector. 2,336 people are employed in the tertiary sector, with 297 businesses in this sector. In 2000 there were 5,433 workers who lived in the municipality. Of these, 4,124 or about 75.9% of the residents worked outside Oftringen while 2,037 people commuted into the municipality for work. There were a total of 3,346 jobs (of at least 6 hours per week) in the municipality. Of the working population, 10.5% used public transportation to get to work, and 52.2% used a private car.

== Religion ==
From the 2000 census, 2,984 or 29.0% were Roman Catholic, while 4,665 or 45.3% belonged to the Swiss Reformed Church. Of the rest of the population, there were 19 individuals (or about 0.18% of the population) who belonged to the Christian Catholic faith.

== Education ==
In Oftringen about 61.8% of the population (between age 25 and 64) have completed either non-mandatory upper secondary education or additional higher education (either university or a Fachhochschule). Of the school age population (in the 2008/2009 school year), there are 790 students attending primary school, there are 358 students attending secondary school, there are 137 students attending tertiary or university level schooling in the municipality.

Oftringen is home to the Gemeindebibliothek (municipal library of Oftringen). The library has (as of 2008) 12,038 books or other media, and loaned out 37,384 items in the same year. It was open a total of 200 days with average of 15 hours per week during that year.

== Notable people ==
- Arnold Lang (1855 in Oftringen – 1914) a Swiss naturalist and comparative anatomist
- Sandro Burki (born 1985 in Oftringen) a retired midfield footballer, about 400 club caps, mainly for FC Aarau
