= Safenwil =

- Municipality
- Flag Coat of arms
- Location of Safenwil
- Location within Switzerland Location within Canton of Aargau
- Coordinates: 47°19′N 7°59′E
- Country: Switzerland
- Canton: Aargau
- District: Zofingen

Area
  - Total: 5.99 km^{2} (2.31 sq mi)
- Elevation: 483 m (1,585 ft)

Population (December 2006)
  - Total: 3,108
  - Density: 519/km^{2} (1,340/sq mi)
- Time zone: UTC+01:00 (CET)
  - Summer (DST): UTC+02:00 (CEST)
- Postal code: 5745
- SFOS number: 4283
- ISO 3166 code: CH-AG
- Surrounded by: Gretzenbach (SO), Kölliken, Oftringen, Uerkheim, Walterswil (SO), Zofingen
- Website: www.safenwil.ch

Safenwil is a municipality in the district of Zofingen in the canton of Aargau in Switzerland.

== History ==
Aerial view (1958)

The first settlement in the area was a Roman era estate on a mule track from the Wigger valley toward Vindonissa. This was followed by a small Alamanni camp or settlement. The Eberkopf (German: Boar's Head) rock carvings date back to 893 AD, though the modern village of Safenwil is first mentioned in 924 as Sabenewilare. In the 13th century the village was under the rule Belp. In the 14th century the Ifenthal family ruled over the village from Scherenberg castle. With the conquest of the Aargau in 1415, the village came under the authority of Bern. Under Bernese rule, Safenwil was located in the Lenzburg District. In 1415 Bern took over the high court rights in the village. The low court right was held by Gösgen in Solothurn after 1458. In 1665 this court also went to Bern. In 1803 it became part of the newly formed Canton of Aargau and was assigned to the Zofingen district. School houses were built in Safenwil in 1730, 1829–30, 1908, 1969 and 1999.

In 1304, Zofingen monastery built the St. Ulrich's Chapel in Safenwil. During the Protestant Reformation, Bern destroyed the chapel. Before the Reformation, Safenwil was part of the Gretzenbach parish. Between 1528 and 1616 it was in the Zofingen parish, and after 1616 it was part of the Kölliken parish. In 1865 it became an independent parish, and built its own church in 1866-67.

Around 1770 Bern built the regional road from Bern to Zürich through the village. Then, in 1877, Swiss Federal Railways included it on the Aarau-Zofingen line. Since 1967, the A1 motorway cuts through the town. The good transportation links allowed the town to grow. Around 1820 the first factory, a weaving and dyeing factory, opened in Safenwil. The Hüssy factory remained open for over a century, closing in 1934. In 1897 the Hochuli knitting factory opened near the train station. In the 19th and 20th centuries several other factories opened, while other residents commuted to factories in Zofingen and Schönenwerd. In 1920, 14% of the jobs were in agriculture, while 75% were in industry. By 2005 most of the heavy industry had moved out and only 19% worked in industry while 77% worked in the services sector. In 1951, the car import company Emil Frey moved into the municipality. This company employs approximately 230 workers and shapes the local labor market and the village.

== Geography ==
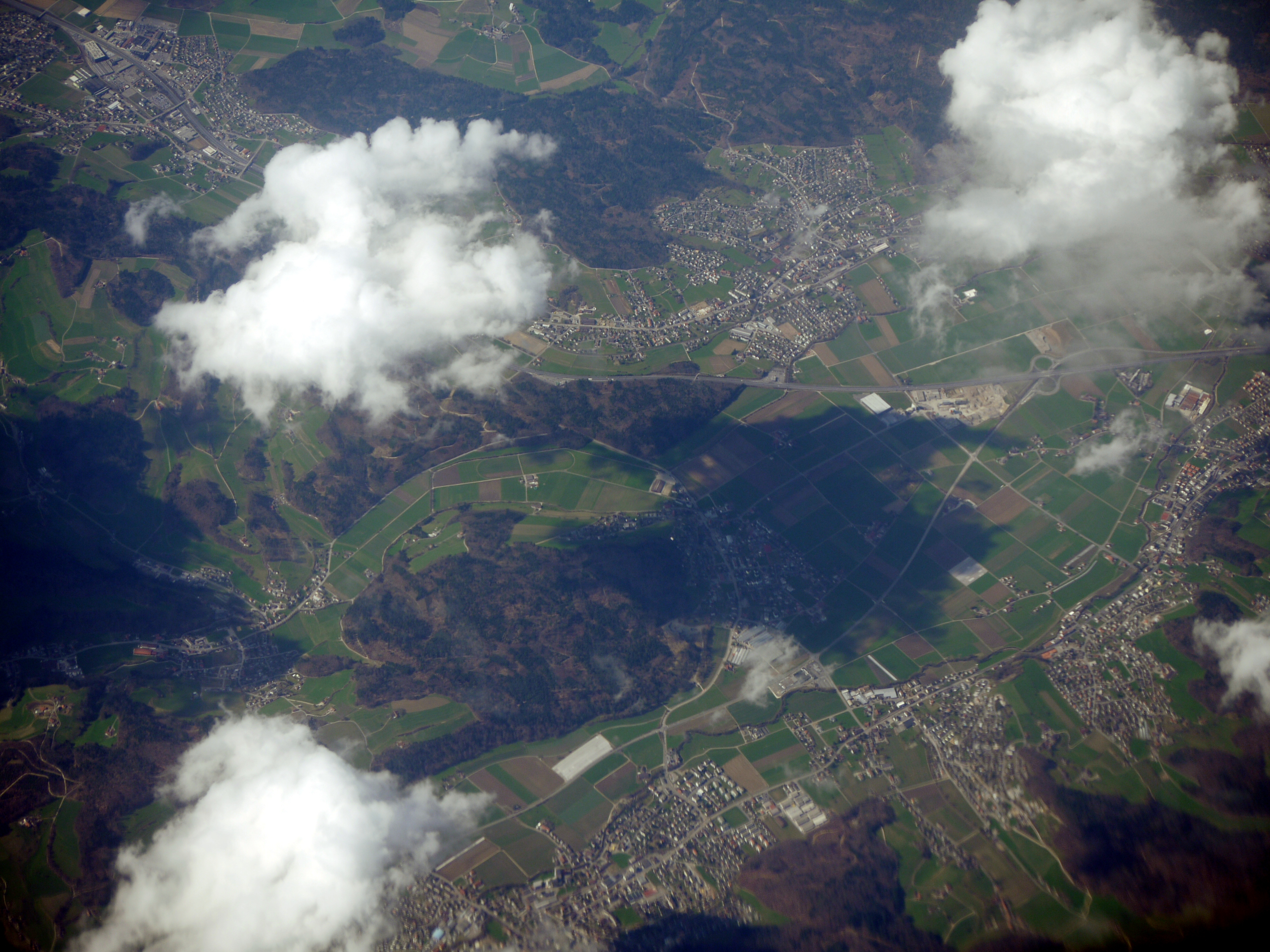
Safenwil and Kölliken

Safenwil has an area, as of 2009, of 5.99 square kilometers (2.31 sq mi). Of this area, 1.66 km^{2} (0.64 sq mi) or 27.7% is used for agricultural purposes, while 2.75 km^{2} (1.06 sq mi) or 45.9% is forested. Of the rest of the land, 1.61 km^{2} (0.62 sq mi) or 26.9% is settled (buildings or roads) and 0.01 km^{2} (2.5 acres) or 0.2% is unproductive land.

Of the built-up area, industrial buildings made up 5.0% of the total area while housing and buildings made up 13.0% and transportation infrastructure made up 7.2%. Out of the forested land area, all of it is covered with heavy forests. Of the agricultural land, 12.2% is used for growing crops and 14.7% is pastures.

The municipality is located in the Zofingen district, between the lower Wigger and Suhre river valleys. Its northern border is shared with the Canton of Solothurn.

== Coat of arms ==
The blazon of the municipal coat of arms is Azure a Boar's Head Argent and in chief a Mullet Or.

== Demographics ==
Safenwil has a population (as of December 2020) of 4,107. As of June 2009, 14.7% of the population are foreign nationals. Over the last 10 years (1997–2007) the population has changed at a rate of -0.5%. Most of the population (as of 2000) speaks German (92.1%), with Italian being second most common ( 1.6%) and Albanian being third ( 1.5%).

The age distribution, as of 2008, in Safenwil is; 300 children or 9.1% of the population are between 0 and 9 years old and 382 teenagers or 11.6% are between 10 and 19. Of the adult population, 374 people or 11.4% of the population are between 20 and 29 years old. 440 people or 13.4% are between 30 and 39, 580 people or 17.7% are between 40 and 49, and 515 people or 15.7% are between 50 and 59. The senior population distribution is 330 people or 10.1% of the population are between 60 and 69 years old, 213 people or 6.5% are between 70 and 79, there are 131 people or 4.0% who are between 80 and 89, and there are 14 people or 0.4% who are 90 and older.

As of 2000, there were 87 homes with 1 or 2 persons in the household, 648 homes with 3 or 4 persons in the household, and 497 homes with 5 or more persons in the household. As of 2000, there were 1,275 private households (homes and apartments) in the municipality, and an average of 2.4 persons per household. In 2008 there were 675 single family homes (or 45.0% of the total) out of a total of 1,499 homes and apartments. There were a total of 24 empty apartments for a 1.6% vacancy rate. As of 2007, the construction rate of new housing units was 3.2 new units per 1000 residents.

In the 2007 federal election the most popular party was the SVP which received 45.3% of the vote. The next three most popular parties were the SP (18.43%), the FDP (11.45%) and the EVP Party (7.68%). In the federal election, a total of 944 votes were cast, and the voter turnout was 41.1%.

The historical population is given in the following table:

Historical population
| Year | Pop. | ±% |
|---|---|---|
| 1764 | 506 | — |
| 1798 | 713 | +40.9% |
| 1850 | 1,200 | +68.3% |
| 1900 | 1,347 | +12.3% |
| 1950 | 1,919 | +42.5% |
| 2000 | 3,128 | +63.0% |

== Points of interest ==
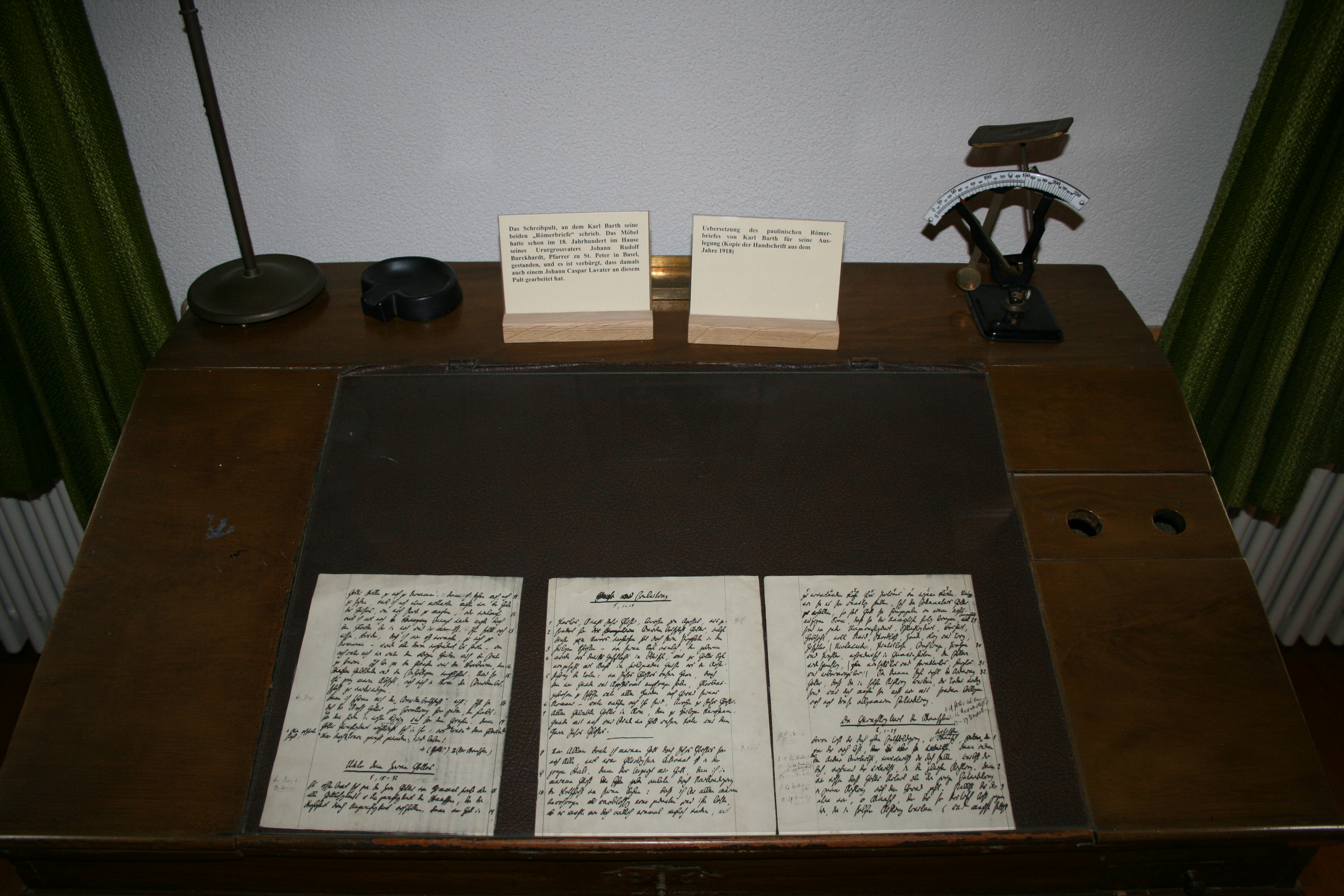
Some of Karl Barth's writings at the Karl-Barth-Stube museum

- Theologian Karl Barth formulated his early theology and wrote his influential commentary The Epistle to the Romans (German: Römerbrief) while serving as a pastor in Safenwil.
- Rock carvings in the historical landmark the Eberkopf (German: Boar's Head) date back to 893 AD. Safenwil's coat of arms depicts a boar's head.

== Economy ==
As of 2007, Safenwil had an unemployment rate of 2.54%. As of 2005, there were 62 people employed in the primary economic sector and about 21 businesses involved in this sector. 279 people are employed in the secondary sector and there are 48 businesses in this sector. 1,144 people are employed in the tertiary sector, with 102 businesses in this sector.

In 2000 there were 1,664 workers who lived in the municipality. Of these, 1,114 or about 66.9% of the residents worked outside Safenwil while 996 people commuted into the municipality for work. There were a total of 1,546 jobs (of at least 6 hours per week) in the municipality. Of the working population, 7.7% used public transportation to get to work, and 58.7% used a private car.

== Religion ==
From the 2000 census, 640 or 20.5% were Roman Catholic, while 1,899 or 60.7% belonged to the Swiss Reformed Church. Of the rest of the population, there was 1 individual who belonged to the Christian Catholic faith.

== Education ==
In Safenwil about 70.7% of the population (between age 25-64) have completed either non-mandatory upper secondary education or additional higher education (either university or a Fachhochschule). Of the school age population (in the 2008/2009 school year), there are 204 students attending primary school, there are 120 students attending secondary school in the municipality. Safenwil is home to the Volksbibliothek Safenwil (Public Library of Safenwil).
