= Andrea Fattizzo =

Italian footballer (born 1975)

Personal information
- Date of birth: 29 January 1975 (age 51)
- Place of birth: Zofingen, Switzerland
- Height: 1.77 m (5 ft 10 in)
- Position: Defender

Senior career*
Years	Team	Apps	(Gls)
1992–1995	Lecce	3	(0)
1995–1999	Toma Maglie	92	(7)
1999–2000	Palermo	5	(0)
2000	Calcio	14	(0)
2000–2001	Chieti	18	(0)
2001	Calcio	11	(0)
2001–2002	Tricase Calcio	28	(2)
2002–2003	Frosinone	14	(0)
2002	Sassuolo	11	(0)
2003–2004	Cosenza	20	(0)
2004–2005	Nardò	19	(0)
Total		235	(9)
- * Club domestic league appearances and goals

Andrea Fattizzo (born 29 January 1975) is a retired Italian footballer. He played as a defender. He made his debut with U.S. Lecce in Serie A on 5 September 1993 against Parma. In the following year, he played two matches in Serie B against Atalanta and Palermo. He then played for many Serie C and Serie D teams.
