= Wiliberg =

- Municipality
- Flag Coat of arms
- Location of Wiliberg
- Location within Switzerland Location within Canton of Aargau
- Coordinates: 47°16′N 8°1′E
- Country: Switzerland
- Canton: Aargau
- District: Zofingen

Area
  - Total: 1.17 km^{2} (0.45 sq mi)
- Elevation: 651 m (2,136 ft)

Population (December 2006)
  - Total: 157
  - Density: 134/km^{2} (348/sq mi)
- Time zone: UTC+01:00 (CET)
  - Summer (DST): UTC+02:00 (CEST)
- Postal code: 5058
- SFOS number: 4288
- ISO 3166 code: CH-AG
- Surrounded by: Attelwil, Bottenwil, Reiden (LU), Reitnau, Staffelbach, Wikon (LU)
- Website: www.wiliberg.ch

Wiliberg is a municipality in the district of Zofingen in the canton of Aargau in Switzerland.

== Geography ==
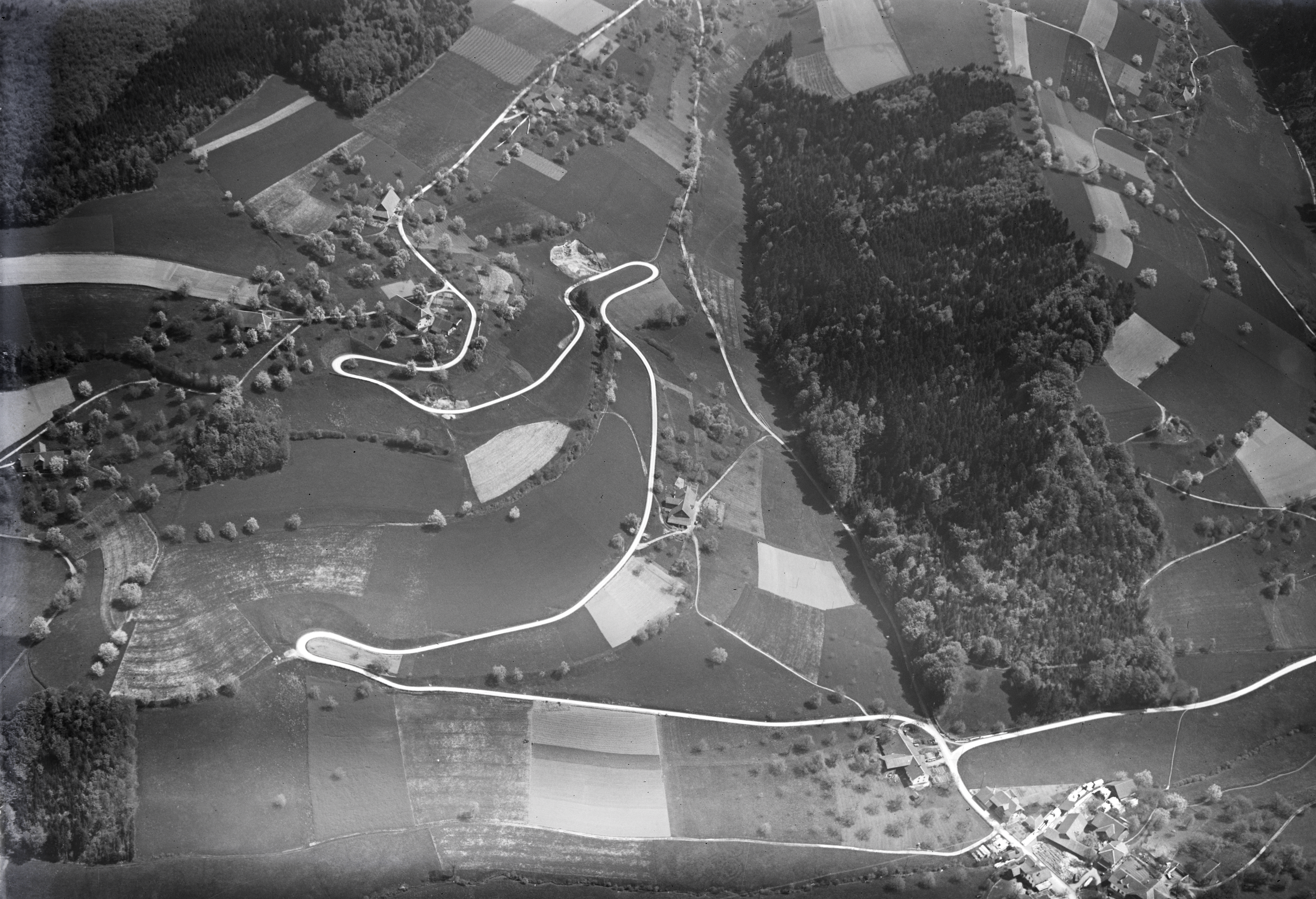
Aerial view by Walter Mittelholzer (between 1919 and 1937)

Wiliberg has an area, as of 2009, of 1.17 square kilometers (0.45 sq mi). Of this area, 0.85 km^{2} (0.33 sq mi) or 72.6% is used for agricultural purposes, while 0.21 km^{2} (0.081 sq mi) or 17.9% is forested. Of the rest of the land, 0.14 km^{2} (35 acres) or 12.0% is settled (buildings or roads).

Of the built up area, housing and buildings made up 4.3% and transportation infrastructure made up 6.8%. Out of the forested land, all of the forested land area is covered with heavy forests. Of the agricultural land, 16.2% is used for growing crops and 52.1% is pastures, while 4.3% is used for orchards or vine crops.

== Coat of arms ==
The blazon of the municipal coat of arms is Per fess Argent a Vine branch Vert leaved of two of the same and fructed Azure and Azure a base-semi Mill-Wheel Or.

== Demographics ==
Wiliberg has a population (as of December 2020) of 167 As of June 2009, 2.5% of the population are foreign nationals. Over the last 10 years (1997–2007) the population has changed at a rate of 2.6%. All of the population (as of 2000) speaks German.

The age distribution, as of 2008, in Wiliberg is; 20 children or 12.5% of the population are between 0 and 9 years old and 20 teenagers or 12.5% are between 10 and 19. Of the adult population, 15 people or 9.4% of the population are between 20 and 29 years old. 18 people or 11.3% are between 30 and 39, 32 people or 20.0% are between 40 and 49, and 28 people or 17.5% are between 50 and 59. The senior population distribution is 11 people or 6.9% of the population are between 60 and 69 years old, 10 people or 6.3% are between 70 and 79, there are 4 people or 2.5% who are between 80 and 89, and there are 2 people or 1.3% who are 90 and older.

As of 2000, there were no homes with 1 or 2 persons in the household, 18 homes with 3 or 4 persons in the household, and 30 homes with 5 or more persons in the household. As of 2000, there were 50 private households (homes and apartments) in the municipality, and an average of 3. persons per household. In 2008 there were 30 single family homes (or 47.6% of the total) out of a total of 63 homes and apartments. There were a total of 1 empty apartments for a 1.6% vacancy rate. As of 2007, the construction rate of new housing units was 0 new units per 1000 residents.

In the 2007 federal election the SVP received 61.04% of the vote. Most of the rest of the votes went to the SP with 9.13% of the vote. In the federal election, a total of 70 votes were cast, and the voter turnout was 57.4%.

The historical population is given in the following table:

Historical population
Year	Pop.	±%
1975	120	—
1980	132	+10.0%
1990	148	+12.1%
2000	157	+6.1%

== Economy ==
As of 2007, Wiliberg had an unemployment rate of 0.66%. As of 2005, there were 21 people employed in the primary economic sector and about 9 businesses involved in this sector. 1 person is employed in the secondary sector and there is 1 business in this sector. 10 people are employed in the tertiary sector, with 3 businesses in this sector.

In 2000 there were 86 workers who lived in the municipality. Of these, 51 or about 59.3% of the residents worked outside Wiliberg while 4 people commuted into the municipality for work. There were a total of 39 jobs (of at least 6 hours per week) in the municipality. Of the working population, 0% used public transportation to get to work, and 63.6% used a private car.

== Religion ==
From the 2000 census, 21 or 13.9% were Roman Catholic, while 121 or 80.1% belonged to the Swiss Reformed Church.

== Education ==
In Wiliberg about 81.4% of the population (between age 25-64) have completed either non-mandatory upper secondary education or additional higher education (either university or a Fachhochschule). Of the school age population (in the 2008/2009 school year), there are 14 students attending primary school in the municipality.
