= Uerkheim =

- Municipality
- Flag Coat of arms
- Location of Uerkheim
- Location within Switzerland Location within Canton of Aargau
- Coordinates: 47°18′N 8°2′E
- Country: Switzerland
- Canton: Aargau
- District: Zofingen

Area
  - Total: 7.09 km^{2} (2.74 sq mi)
- Elevation: 455 m (1,493 ft)

Population (December 2006)
  - Total: 1,294
  - Density: 183/km^{2} (473/sq mi)
- Time zone: UTC+01:00 (CET)
  - Summer (DST): UTC+02:00 (CEST)
- Postal code: 4813
- SFOS number: 4286
- ISO 3166 code: CH-AG
- Surrounded by: Bottenwil, Holziken, Kölliken, Safenwil, Schöftland, Staffelbach, Zofingen
- Website: www.uerkheim.ch

Uerkheim is a municipality in the district of Zofingen in the canton of Aargau in Switzerland.

== Geography ==
Aerial view from 2000 m by Walter Mittelholzer (1923)

Uerkheim has an area, as of 2009, of 7.1 square kilometers (2.7 sq mi). Of this area, 3.41 km^{2} (1.32 sq mi) or 48.0% is used for agricultural purposes, while 2.86 km^{2} (1.10 sq mi) or 40.3% is forested. Of the rest of the land, 0.79 km^{2} (0.31 sq mi) or 11.1% is settled (buildings or roads), 0.01 km^{2} (2.5 acres) or 0.1% is either rivers or lakes and 0.01 km^{2} (2.5 acres) or 0.1% is unproductive land.

Of the built up area, industrial buildings made up 1.1% of the total area while housing and buildings made up 6.3% and transportation infrastructure made up 3.7%. Out of the forested land, 36.9% of the total land area is heavily forested and 3.4% is covered with orchards or small clusters of trees. Of the agricultural land, 13.4% is used for growing crops and 32.8% is pastures, while 1.8% is used for orchards or vine crops. All the water in the municipality is flowing water.

The municipality of Uerkheim is considering a merger on 1 January 2014 into Zofingen.

== Coat of arms ==
The blazon of the municipal coat of arms is Argent a Bar Gules between two Mullets of Five Or.

== Demographics ==
Uerkheim has a population (as of December 2020) of 1,342. As of June 2009, 9.5% of the population are foreign nationals. Over the last 10 years (1997–2007) the population has changed at a rate of -2.9%. Most of the population (as of 2000) speaks German (95.4%), with Albanian being second most common ( 1.3%) and French being third ( 0.9%).

The age distribution, as of 2008, in Uerkheim is; 117 children or 9.1% of the population are between 0 and 9 years old and 156 teenagers or 12.1% are between 10 and 19. Of the adult population, 142 people or 11.1% of the population are between 20 and 29 years old. 162 people or 12.6% are between 30 and 39, 245 people or 19.1% are between 40 and 49, and 194 people or 15.1% are between 50 and 59. The senior population distribution is 128 people or 10.0% of the population are between 60 and 69 years old, 91 people or 7.1% are between 70 and 79, there are 46 people or 3.6% who are between 80 and 89, and there are 4 people or 0.3% who are 90 and older.

As of 2000, there were 31 homes with 1 or 2 persons in the household, 254 homes with 3 or 4 persons in the household, and 202 homes with 5 or more persons in the household. As of 2000, there were 500 private households (homes and apartments) in the municipality, and an average of 2.5 persons per household. In 2008 there were 212 single family homes (or 37.5% of the total) out of a total of 565 homes and apartments. There were a total of 2 empty apartments for a 0.4% vacancy rate. As of 2007, the construction rate of new housing units was 2.3 new units per 1000 residents.

In the 2007 federal election the most popular party was the SVP which received 52.66% of the vote. The next three most popular parties were the SP (13.64%), the FDP (8.61%) and the Green Party (6.63%). In the federal election, a total of 464 votes were cast, and the voter turnout was 47.0%.

The historical population is given in the following table:

Historical population
Year	Pop.	±%
1975	1,177	—
1980	1,168	−0.8%
1990	1,281	+9.7%
2000	1,287	+0.5%

== Economy ==
As of 2007, Uerkheim had an unemployment rate of 1.1%. As of 2005, there were 101 people employed in the primary economic sector and about 40 businesses involved in this sector. 86 people are employed in the secondary sector and there are 20 businesses in this sector. 178 people are employed in the tertiary sector, with 36 businesses in this sector.

In 2000 there were 688 workers who lived in the municipality. Of these, 517 or about 75.1% of the residents worked outside Uerkheim while 114 people commuted into the municipality for work. There were a total of 285 jobs (of at least 6 hours per week) in the municipality. Of the working population, 7.9% used public transportation to get to work, and 57.5% used a private car.

== Religion ==
From the 2000 census, 199 or 15.7% were Roman Catholic, while 881 or 69.5% belonged to the Swiss Reformed Church. Of the rest of the population, there was 1 individual who belonged to the Christian Catholic faith.

== Education ==
In Uerkheim about 69.7% of the population (between age 25-64) have completed either non-mandatory upper secondary education or additional higher education (either university or a Fachhochschule). Of the school age population (in the 2008/2009 school year), there are 81 students attending primary school in the municipality.

Uerkheim is home to the Schul-u.Gde.Bibliothek Uerkheim (school and municipal library of Uerkheim). The library has (as of 2008) 4,351 books or other media, and loaned out 3,833 items in the same year. It was open a total of 91 days with average of 4 hours per week during that year.
