= Reiden =

- Municipality
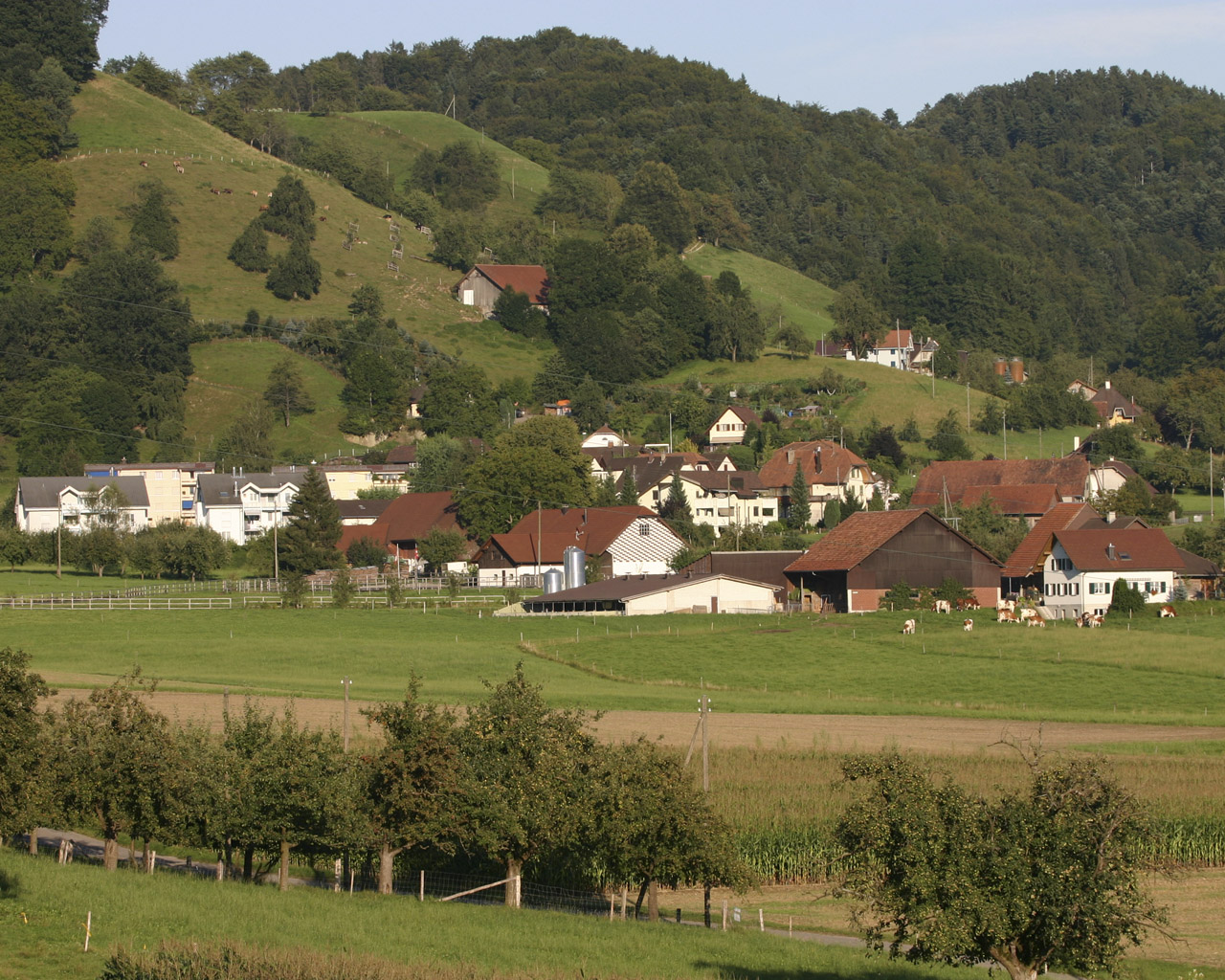

- Coat of arms
- Location of Reiden
- Location within Switzerland Location within Canton of Lucerne
- Coordinates: 47°15′N 7°58′E
- Country: Switzerland
- Canton: Lucerne
- District: Willisau

Area
  - Total: 27.12 km^{2} (10.47 sq mi)
- Elevation: 457 m (1,499 ft)

Population (December 2020)
  - Total: 7,255
  - Density: 267.5/km^{2} (692.9/sq mi)
- Time zone: UTC+01:00 (CET)
  - Summer (DST): UTC+02:00 (CEST)
- Postal code: 6260
- SFOS number: 1140
- ISO 3166 code: CH-LU
- Surrounded by: Altishofen, Brittnau (AG), Dagmersellen, Ebersecken, Grossdietwil, Pfaffnau, Reitnau (AG), Wikon, Wiliberg (AG), Winikon
- Website: www.reiden.ch

Reiden (Swiss Standard German pronunciation: [ˈraɪdn̩]) is a municipality in the district of Willisau in the canton of Lucerne in Switzerland. On January 1, 2006 the former municipalities of Langnau bei Reiden and Richenthal were united in the new municipality of Reiden.

== Geography ==
Aerial view (1957)

Reiden has an area, as of 2006, of 27 km^{2} (10 sq mi). Of this area, 52.7% is used for agricultural purposes, while 36.7% is forested. Of the rest of the land, 10.2% is settled (buildings or roads) and the remainder (0.5%) is non-productive (rivers, glaciers or mountains). In the 1997 land survey, 36.67% of the total land area was forested. Of the agricultural land, 49.96% is used for farming or pastures, while 2.7% is used for orchards or vine crops. Of the settled areas, 5.19% is covered with buildings, 0.78% is industrial, 0.59% is classed as special developments, 0.37% is parks or greenbelts and 3.26% is transportation infrastructure. Of the unproductive areas, 0.41% is unproductive flowing water (rivers) and 0.07% is other unproductive land.

== Demographics ==
Reiden has a population (as of 31 December 2020) of 7,255. As of 2007, 1,332 or about 21.0% are not Swiss citizens. Over the last 10 years the population has grown at a rate of 4%. Most of the population (as of 2000) speaks German (86.9%), with Albanian being second most common ( 5.3%) and Italian being third ( 2.5%).

In the 2007 election the most popular party was the FDP which received 29.6% of the vote. The next three most popular parties were the CVP (28.8%), the SVP (28.2%) and the SPS (7%).

The age distribution, as of 2008, in Reiden is; 1,491 people or 23.5% of the population is 0–19 years old. 1,706 people or 26.9% are 20–39 years old, and 2,233 people or 35.3% are 40–64 years old. The senior population distribution is 699 people or 11% are 65–79 years old, 179 or 2.8% are 80–89 years old and 26 people or 0.4% of the population are 90+ years old.

In Reiden about 63.5% of the population (between age 25-64) have completed either non-mandatory upper secondary education or additional higher education (either university or a Fachhochschule).

As of 2000 there are 2,154 households, of which 601 households (or about 27.9%) contain only a single individual. 274 or about 12.7% are large households, with at least five members. As of 2000 there were 1,066 inhabited buildings in the municipality, of which 816 were built only as housing, and 250 were mixed use buildings. There were 558 single family homes, 105 double family homes, and 153 multi-family homes in the municipality. Most homes were either two (467) or three (230) story structures. There were only 67 single story buildings and 52 four or more story buildings.

Reiden has an unemployment rate of 2.16%. As of 2005, there were 240 people employed in the primary economic sector and about 84 businesses involved in this sector. 1146 people are employed in the secondary sector and there are 75 businesses in this sector. 1083 people are employed in the tertiary sector, with 177 businesses in this sector. As of 2000 50.3% of the population of the municipality were employed in some capacity. At the same time, females made up 39.7% of the workforce.

In the 2000 census the religious membership of Reiden was; 3,880 (65.1%) were Roman Catholic, and 999 (16.8%) were Protestant, with an additional 106 (1.78%) that were of some other Christian faith. There are 1 individuals (0.02% of the population) who are Jewish. There are 481 individuals (8.07% of the population) who are Muslim. Of the rest; there were 26 (0.44%) individuals who belong to another religion (not listed), 277 (4.65%) who do not belong to any organized religion, 188 (3.16%) who did not answer the question.
