= Attelwil =

- Former municipality
- Flag Coat of arms
- Location of Attelwil
- Location within Switzerland Location within Canton of Aargau
- Coordinates: 47°16′N 8°3′E
- Country: Switzerland
- Canton: Aargau
- District: Zofingen

Area
  - Total: 2.22 km^{2} (0.86 sq mi)
- Elevation: 501 m (1,644 ft)

Population (December 2020)
  - Total: 302
  - Density: 136/km^{2} (352/sq mi)
- Time zone: UTC+01:00 (CET)
  - Summer (DST): UTC+02:00 (CEST)
- Postal code: 5056
- SFOS number: 4272
- ISO 3166 code: CH-AG
- Surrounded by: Moosleerau, Reitnau, Staffelbach, Wiliberg
- Website: www.attelwil.ch

Attelwil is a former municipality in the district of Zofingen in the canton of Aargau in Switzerland. On 1 January 2019 the former municipality of Attelwil merged into the municipality of Reitnau.

== History ==
Attelwil is first mentioned in 1306 as Attelwile.

== Geography ==
Attelwil has an area, as of 2009, of 2.22 square kilometers (0.86 sq mi). Of this area, 1.15 km^{2} (0.44 sq mi) or 51.8% is used for agricultural purposes, while 0.76 km^{2} (0.29 sq mi) or 34.2% is forested. Of the rest of the land, 0.29 km^{2} (0.11 sq mi) or 13.1% is settled (buildings or roads).

Of the built up area, industrial buildings made up 1.8% of the total area while housing and buildings made up 6.8% and transportation infrastructure made up 3.2%. Power and water infrastructure as well as other special developed areas made up 1.4% of the area Out of the forested land, 32.4% of the total land area is heavily forested and 1.8% is covered with orchards or small clusters of trees. Of the agricultural land, 36.5% is used for growing crops and 12.6% is pastures, while 2.7% is used for orchards or vine crops.

The municipality is located in the Zofingen district, on the left side of the upper Suhre river valley (Suhrental). It consists of the haufendorf village (an irregular, unplanned and quite closely packed village, built around a central square) of Attelwil.

== Coat of arms ==
The blazon of the municipal coat of arms is Or an Eagle displayed Sable membered Gules.

== Demographics ==
Attelwil has a population (as of December 2020) of 302. As of June 2009, 1.1% of the population are foreign nationals. Over the last 10 years (1997–2007) the population has changed at a rate of -1.3%. Most of the population (as of 2000) speaks German (98.0%), with Albanian being second most common ( 1.7%) and English being third ( 0.3%).

The age distribution, as of 2008, in Attelwil is; 25 children or 8.5% of the population are between 0 and 9 years old and 48 teenagers or 16.3% are between 10 and 19. Of the adult population, 35 people or 11.9% of the population are between 20 and 29 years old. 36 people or 12.2% are between 30 and 39, 47 people or 16.0% are between 40 and 49, and 52 people or 17.7% are between 50 and 59. The senior population distribution is 23 people or 7.8% of the population are between 60 and 69 years old, 13 people or 4.4% are between 70 and 79, there are 15 people or 5.1% who are between 80 and 89.

As of 2000 the average number of residents per living room was 0.58 which is about equal to the cantonal average of 0.57 per room. In this case, a room is defined as space of a housing unit of at least 4 m^{2} (43 sq ft) as normal bedrooms, dining rooms, living rooms, kitchens and habitable cellars and attics. About 69.2% of the total households were owner occupied, or in other words did not pay rent (though they may have a mortgage or a rent-to-own agreement).

As of 2000, there were 4 homes with 1 or 2 persons in the household, 39 homes with 3 or 4 persons in the household, and 64 homes with 5 or more persons in the household. As of 2000, there were 108 private households (homes and apartments) in the municipality, and an average of 2.8 persons per household. In 2008 there were 56 single family homes (or 45.5% of the total) out of a total of 123 homes and apartments. There were a total of 0 empty apartments for a 0.0% vacancy rate. As of 2007, the construction rate of new housing units was 0 new units per 1000 residents.

In the 2007 federal election the most popular party was the SVP which received 51.79% of the vote. The next three most popular parties were the Green Party (11.85%), the EVP Party (8.66%) and the SP (8.5%). In the federal election, a total of 127 votes were cast, and the voter turnout was 53.6%.

The historical population is given in the following table:

Historical population
Year	Pop.	±%
1798	179	—
1850	282	+57.5%
1900	263	−6.7%
1950	219	−16.7%
1990	282	+28.8%
2000	303	+7.4%

== Economy ==
As of 2007, Attelwil had an unemployment rate of 1.05%. As of 2005, there were 28 people employed in the primary economic sector and about 10 businesses involved in this sector. 43 people are employed in the secondary sector and there are 5 businesses in this sector. 44 people are employed in the tertiary sector, with 10 businesses in this sector.

In 2000 there were 152 workers who lived in the municipality. Of these, 107 or about 70.4% of the residents worked outside Attelwil while 42 people commuted into the municipality for work. There were a total of 87 jobs (of at least 6 hours per week) in the municipality. Of the working population, 6.5% used public transportation to get to work, and 52.3% used a private car.

== Religion ==
From the 2000 census, 60 or 19.8% were Roman Catholic, while 217 or 71.6% belonged to the Swiss Reformed Church.

== Education ==
In Attelwil about 85.8% of the population (between age 25-64) have completed either non-mandatory upper secondary education or additional higher education (either university or a Fachhochschule). Of the school age population (in the 2008/2009 school year) in the municipality.
