= Kölliken =

- Municipality
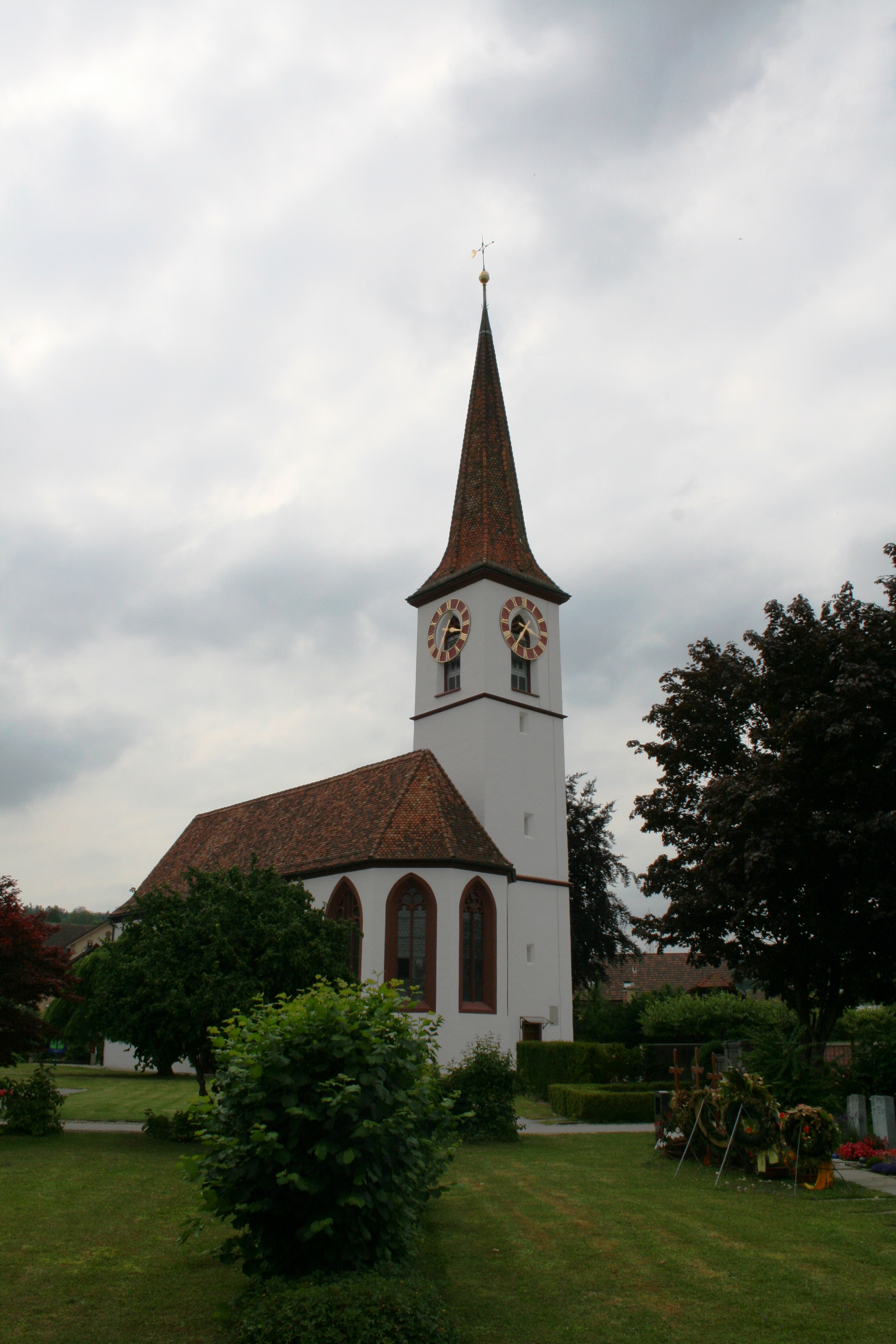
- Kölliken village Protestant church

- Flag Coat of arms
- Location of Kölliken
- Location within Switzerland Location within Canton of Aargau
- Coordinates: 47°20′N 8°1′E
- Country: Switzerland
- Canton: Aargau
- District: Zofingen

Area
  - Total: 8.89 km^{2} (3.43 sq mi)
- Elevation: 430 m (1,410 ft)

Population (December 2006)
  - Total: 4,048
  - Density: 455/km^{2} (1,180/sq mi)
- Time zone: UTC+01:00 (CET)
  - Summer (DST): UTC+02:00 (CEST)
- Postal code: 5742
- SFOS number: 4276
- ISO 3166 code: CH-AG
- Surrounded by: Gretzenbach (SO), Holziken, Muhen, Oberentfelden, Safenwil, Uerkheim
- Website: www.koelliken.ch

Kölliken is a municipality in the district of Zofingen in the canton of Aargau in Switzerland. It was also home to one of the two most toxic hazardous waste landfills in all of Switzerland. The other site is in Bonfol, Canton Jura.

== History ==
Kölliken is first mentioned in 924 as Cholinchove.

== Geography ==
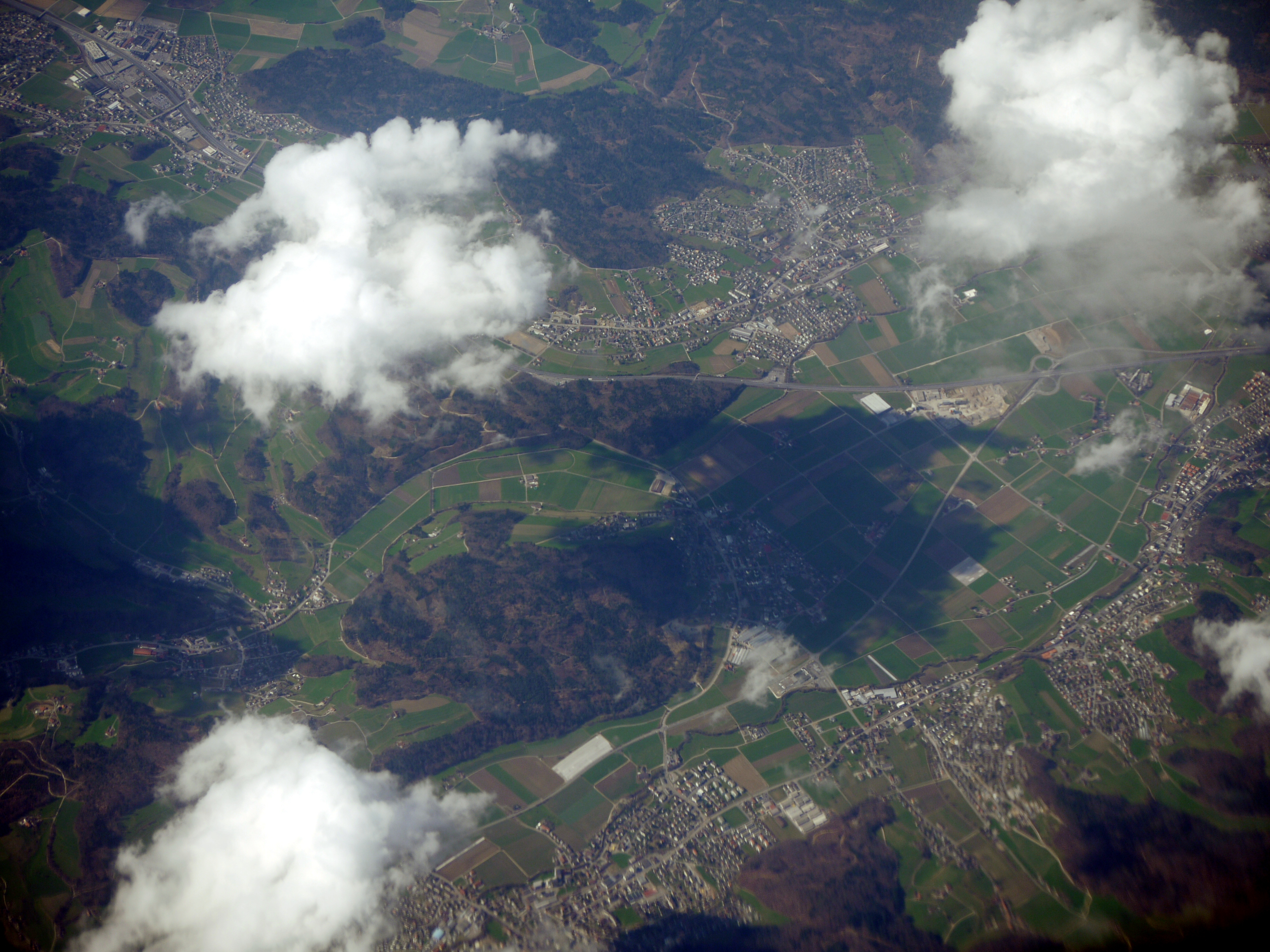
View of Safenwil and Kölliken from the air

Aerial view (1958)

Kölliken has an area, as of 2009, of 8.89 square kilometers (3.43 sq mi). Of this area, 2.92 km^{2} (1.13 sq mi) or 32.8% is used for agricultural purposes, while 3.85 km^{2} (1.49 sq mi) or 43.3% is forested. Of the rest of the land, 2.04 km^{2} (0.79 sq mi) or 22.9% is settled (buildings or roads), 0.02 km^{2} (4.9 acres) or 0.2% is either rivers or lakes and 0.01 km^{2} (2.5 acres) or 0.1% is unproductive land.

Of the built up area, industrial buildings made up 1.7% of the total area while housing and buildings made up 11.8% and transportation infrastructure made up 6.9%. Power and water infrastructure as well as other special developed areas made up 2.0% of the area Out of the forested land, 42.0% of the total land area is heavily forested and 1.3% is covered with orchards or small clusters of trees. Of the agricultural land, 21.9% is used for growing crops and 9.6% is pastures, while 1.3% is used for orchards or vine crops. All the water in the municipality is flowing water.

The municipality is located in the Zofingen district, along Kölliker creek on the western edge of the lower Uerkental. It consists of the linear village of Kölliken.

== Coat of arms ==
The blazon of the municipal coat of arms is Argent a Bear paw Sable armed of the first issuant from sinister holding a Pine tree Vert issuant from Coupeaux of the same.

== Demographics ==
Kölliken has a population (as of December 2020) of 4,559. As of June 2009, 15.5% of the population are foreign nationals. Over the last 10 years (1997–2007) the population has changed at a rate of 6.1%. Most of the population (as of 2000) speaks German (91.7%), with Italian being second most common ( 2.7%) and Albanian being third ( 2.2%).

The age distribution, as of 2008, in Kölliken is; 407 children or 10.0% of the population are between 0 and 9 years old and 500 teenagers or 12.3% are between 10 and 19. Of the adult population, 565 people or 13.8% of the population are between 20 and 29 years old. 532 people or 13.0% are between 30 and 39, 676 people or 16.6% are between 40 and 49, and 567 people or 13.9% are between 50 and 59. The senior population distribution is 381 people or 9.3% of the population are between 60 and 69 years old, 263 people or 6.4% are between 70 and 79, there are 153 people or 3.8% who are between 80 and 89, and there are 36 people or 0.9% who are 90 and older.

As of 2000 the average number of residents per living room was 0.55 which is about equal to the cantonal average of 0.57 per room. In this case, a room is defined as space of a housing unit of at least 4 m^{2} (43 sq ft) as normal bedrooms, dining rooms, living rooms, kitchens and habitable cellars and attics. About 52% of the total households were owner occupied, or in other words did not pay rent (though they may have a mortgage or a rent-to-own agreement).

As of 2000, there were 131 homes with 1 or 2 persons in the household, 746 homes with 3 or 4 persons in the household, and 664 homes with 5 or more persons in the household. As of 2000, there were 1,572 private households (homes and apartments) in the municipality, and an average of 2.4 persons per household. In 2008 there were 806 single family homes (or 44.8% of the total) out of a total of 1,798 homes and apartments. There were a total of 21 empty apartments for a 1.2% vacancy rate. As of 2007, the construction rate of new housing units was 3.9 new units per 1000 residents.

In the 2007 federal election the most popular party was the SVP which received 38.82% of the vote. The next three most popular parties were the SP (17.11%), the FDP (15.37%) and the Green Party (10.32%). In the federal election, a total of 1,274 votes were cast, and the voter turnout was 44.7%.

The historical population is given in the following table:

Historical population
Year	Pop.	±%
1764	896	—
1850	1,782	+98.9%
1900	2,021	+13.4%
1950	2,884	+42.7%
1990	3,557	+23.3%
2000	3,910	+9.9%

== Heritage sites of national significance ==
A thatched-roof house at Schönenwerderstrasse 6 and the Thatched-roof house museum at Hauptstrasse 43 are listed as Swiss heritage sites of national significance.

== Economy ==
As of 2007, Kölliken had an unemployment rate of 2.31%. As of 2005, there were 70 people employed in the primary economic sector and about 23 businesses involved in this sector. 339 people are employed in the secondary sector and there are 48 businesses in this sector. 650 people are employed in the tertiary sector, with 111 businesses in this sector.

In 2000 there were 2,080 workers who lived in the municipality. Of these, 1,578 or about 75.9% of the residents worked outside Kölliken while 595 people commuted into the municipality for work. There were a total of 1,097 jobs (of at least 6 hours per week) in the municipality. Of the working population, 9.9% used public transportation to get to work, and 58.4% used a private car.

== Religion ==
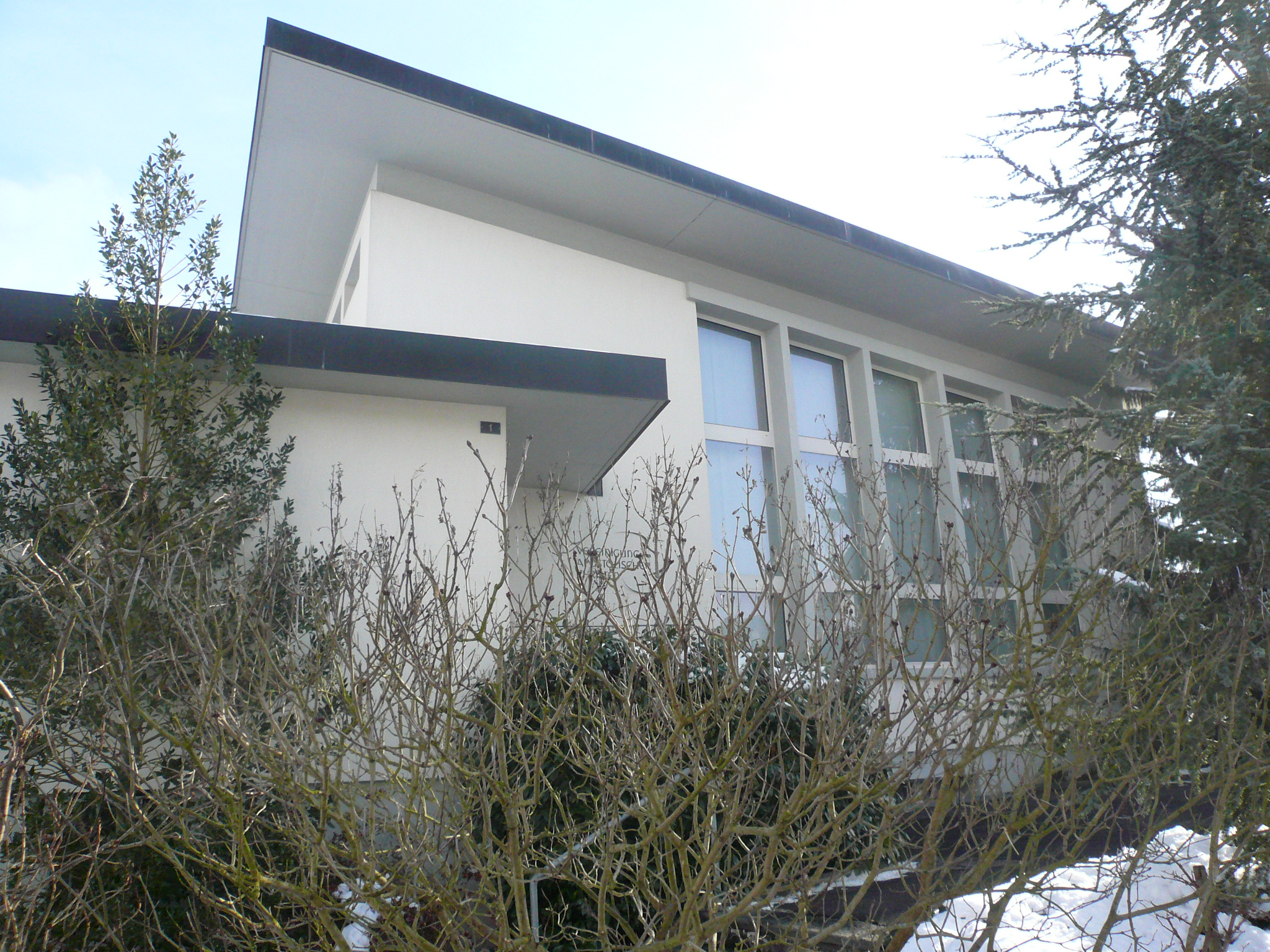
Kölliken congregation of the United Apostolic Church of Switzerland

From the 2000 census, 838 or 21.4% were Roman Catholic, while 2,337 or 59.8% belonged to the Swiss Reformed Church. Of the rest of the population, there were 6 individuals (or about 0.15% of the population) who belonged to the Christian Catholic faith.

== Education ==
The entire Swiss population is generally well educated. In Kölliken about 74.8% of the population (between age 25-64) have completed either non-mandatory upper secondary education or additional higher education (either university or a Fachhochschule). Of the school age population (in the 2008/2009 school year), there are 291 students attending primary school, there are 111 students attending secondary school, there are 178 students attending tertiary or university level schooling in the municipality. Kölliken is home to the Schul-u.Gde.Bibliothek Kölliken (school and municipal library of Kölliken).
