= Staffelbach =

- Municipality
- Flag Coat of arms
- Location of Staffelbach
- Location within Switzerland Location within Canton of Aargau
- Coordinates: 47°17′N 8°3′E
- Country: Switzerland
- Canton: Aargau
- District: Zofingen

Area
  - Total: 8.94 km^{2} (3.45 sq mi)
- Elevation: 488 m (1,601 ft)

Population (December 2006)
  - Total: 1,029
  - Density: 115/km^{2} (298/sq mi)
- Time zone: UTC+01:00 (CET)
  - Summer (DST): UTC+02:00 (CEST)
- Postal code: 5053
- SFOS number: 4284
- ISO 3166 code: CH-AG
- Surrounded by: Attelwil, Bottenwil, Kirchleerau, Moosleerau, Schlossrued, Schöftland, Uerkheim, Wiliberg
- Website: www.staffelbach-ag.ch

Staffelbach is a municipality in the district of Zofingen in the canton of Aargau in Switzerland.

== Geography ==
Aerial view from 2000 m by Walter Mittelholzer (1923)

Staffelbach has an area, as of 2009, of 8.94 square kilometers (3.45 sq mi). Of this area, 4.77 km^{2} (1.84 sq mi) or 53.4% is used for agricultural purposes, while 3.5 km^{2} (1.4 sq mi) or 39.1% is forested. Of the rest of the land, 0.63 km^{2} (0.24 sq mi) or 7.0% is settled (buildings or roads), 0.05 km^{2} (12 acres) or 0.6% is either rivers or lakes.

Of the built up area, housing and buildings made up 3.2% and transportation infrastructure made up 2.1%. Power and water infrastructure as well as other special developed areas made up 1.3% of the area Out of the forested land, 37.6% of the total land area is heavily forested and 1.6% is covered with orchards or small clusters of trees. Of the agricultural land, 31.2% is used for growing crops and 20.6% is pastures, while 1.6% is used for orchards or vine crops. All the water in the municipality is flowing water.

== Coat of arms ==
The blazon of the municipal coat of arms is Azure a Bridge Argent masoned above two barrulets wavy in base and in chief a Mullet of the same.

== Demographics ==
Staffelbach has a population (as of December 2020) of 1,309. As of June 2009, 6.6% of the population are foreign nationals. Over the last 10 years (1997–2007) the population has changed at a rate of 7.6%. Most of the population (as of 2000) speaks German (96.6%), with Italian being second most common ( 0.9%) and Serbo-Croatian being third ( 0.8%).

The age distribution, as of 2008, in Staffelbach is; 98 children or 9.4% of the population are between 0 and 9 years old and 148 teenagers or 14.2% are between 10 and 19. Of the adult population, 107 people or 10.3% of the population are between 20 and 29 years old. 158 people or 15.2% are between 30 and 39, 192 people or 18.5% are between 40 and 49, and 140 people or 13.5% are between 50 and 59. The senior population distribution is 87 people or 8.4% of the population are between 60 and 69 years old, 71 people or 6.8% are between 70 and 79, there are 36 people or 3.5% who are between 80 and 89, and there are 2 people or 0.2% who are 90 and older.

As of 2000, there were 26 homes with 1 or 2 persons in the household, 144 homes with 3 or 4 persons in the household, and 176 homes with 5 or more persons in the household. As of 2000, there were 374 private households (homes and apartments) in the municipality, and an average of 2.6 persons per household. In 2008 there were 172 single family homes (or 42.4% of the total) out of a total of 406 homes and apartments. There were a total of 5 empty apartments for a 1.2% vacancy rate. As of 2007, the construction rate of new housing units was 1 new units per 1000 residents.

In the 2007 federal election the most popular party was the SVP which received 49.63% of the vote. The next three most popular parties were the SP (12.83%), the EVP Party (9.81%) and the FDP (7.7%). In the federal election, a total of 351 votes were cast, and the voter turnout was 44.6%.

The historical population is given in the following table:

Historical population
Year	Pop.	±%
1975	777	—
1980	748	−3.7%
1990	883	+18.0%
2000	1,015	+14.9%

== Economy ==
As of 2007, Staffelbach had an unemployment rate of 0.7%. As of 2005, there were 89 people employed in the primary economic sector and about 29 businesses involved in this sector. 93 people are employed in the secondary sector and there are 10 businesses in this sector. 97 people are employed in the tertiary sector, with 31 businesses in this sector.

In 2000 there were 527 workers who lived in the municipality. Of these, 389 or about 73.8% of the residents worked outside Staffelbach while 123 people commuted into the municipality for work. There were a total of 261 jobs (of at least 6 hours per week) in the municipality. Of the working population, 7.8% used public transportation to get to work, and 61.8% used a private car.

== Religion ==
From the 2000 census, 165 or 16.9% were Roman Catholic, while 678 or 69.3% belonged to the Swiss Reformed Church. Of the rest of the population, there were 6 individuals (or about 0.61% of the population) who belonged to the Christian Catholic faith.

== Education ==
In Staffelbach about 77.4% of the population (between age 25-64) have completed either non-mandatory upper secondary education or additional higher education (either university or a Fachhochschule). Of the school age population (in the 2008/2009 school year), there are 80 students attending primary school, there are 70 students attending secondary school in the municipality.
