= Brittnau =

- Municipality
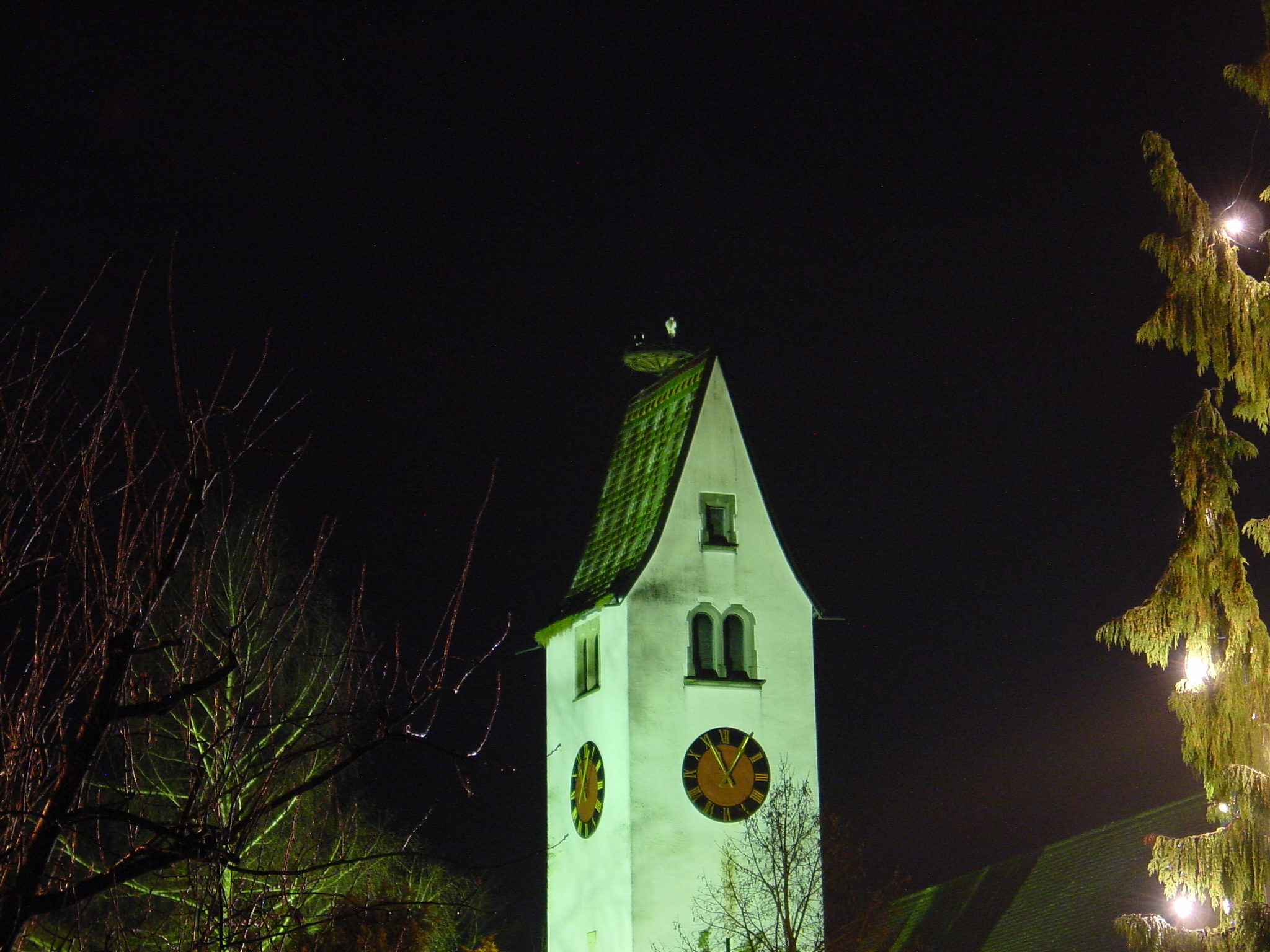

- Flag Coat of arms
- Location of Brittnau
- Location within Switzerland Location within Canton of Aargau
- Coordinates: 47°16′N 7°57′E
- Country: Switzerland
- Canton: Aargau
- District: Zofingen

Area
  - Total: 13.69 km^{2} (5.29 sq mi)
- Elevation: 450 m (1,480 ft)
- Highest elevation (Heidenhubel Höneten): 614 m (2,014 ft)
- Lowest elevation (Eisengrubenweg): 433 m (1,421 ft)

Population (December 2020)
  - Total: 3,968
  - Density: 289.8/km^{2} (750.7/sq mi)
- Time zone: UTC+01:00 (CET)
  - Summer (DST): UTC+02:00 (CEST)
- Postal code: 4805
- SFOS number: 4274
- ISO 3166 code: CH-AG
- Localities: Brittnau, Bergacker, Bösenwil, Bötschishalden, Fennern, Geissbach, Leidenberg, Liebigen, Mättenwil, Schulerslehn, Sennhof, Rossweid, Grod, Wilacker
- Surrounded by: Murgenthal, Pfaffnau (LU), Reiden (LU), Strengelbach, Vordemwald, Wikon (LU), Zofingen
- Website: www.brittnau.ch

Brittnau is a municipality in the district of Zofingen in the canton of Aargau in Switzerland.

Aerial view (1957)

== History ==
Brittnau is first mentioned in 924 as Pritinouva.

== Geography ==
Brittnau has an area, as of 2009, of 13.69 square kilometers (5.29 sq mi). Of this area, 7.23 km^{2} (2.79 sq mi) or 52.8% is used for agricultural purposes, while 4.73 km^{2} (1.83 sq mi) or 34.6% is forested. Of the rest of the land, 1.62 km^{2} (0.63 sq mi) or 11.8% is settled (buildings or roads), 0.1 km^{2} (25 acres) or 0.7% is either rivers or lakes.

Of the built up area, housing and buildings made up 7.5% and transportation infrastructure made up 3.4%. Out of the forested land, all of the forested land area is covered with heavy forests. Of the agricultural land, 35.4% is used for growing crops and 14.5% is pastures, while 2.9% is used for orchards or vine crops. All the water in the municipality is flowing water.

The municipality is located in the Zofingen district on the left side of the mid-Wigger river valley (Wiggertal). It comprises Brittnau itself and the following villages:

- Bergacker
- Bösenwil
- Bötschishalden
- Fennern
- Geissbach
- Grod
- Leidenberg
- Liebigen
- Mättenwil
- Rossweid
- Sennhof
- Wilacker

The municipality borders Wikon, Langnau bei Reiden, Pfaffnau, Murgenthal, Vordemwald, Strengelbach and Zofingen.

== Coat of arms ==
The blazon of the municipal coat of arms is Gules a Bend wavy sinister Argent and Coupeaux Vert.

== Demographics ==
Brittnau has a population (as of December 2020) of 3,968 As of June 2009, 7.5% of the population are foreign nationals. Over the last 10 years (1997–2007) the population has changed at a rate of 4.5%. Most of the population (as of 2000) speaks German(96.1%), with Italian being second most common ( 1.2%) and Portuguese being third ( 0.6%).

The age distribution, as of 2008, in Brittnau is; 384 children or 10.5% of the population are between 0 and 9 years old and 449 teenagers or 12.3% are between 10 and 19. Of the adult population, 407 people or 11.2% of the population are between 20 and 29 years old. 471 people or 12.9% are between 30 and 39, 675 people or 18.5% are between 40 and 49, and 508 people or 14.0% are between 50 and 59. The senior population distribution is 344 people or 9.5% of the population are between 60 and 69 years old, 248 people or 6.8% are between 70 and 79, there are 138 people or 3.8% who are between 80 and 89, and there are 16 people or 0.4% who are 90 and older.

As of 2000 the average number of residents per living room was 0.56 which is about equal to the cantonal average of 0.57 per room. In this case, a room is defined as space of a housing unit of at least 4 m^{2} (43 sq ft) as normal bedrooms, dining rooms, living rooms, kitchens and habitable cellars and attics. About 60.8% of the total households were owner occupied, or in other words did not pay rent (though they may have a mortgage or a rent-to-own agreement).

As of 2000, there were 83 homes with 1 or 2 persons in the household, 670 homes with 3 or 4 persons in the household, and 564 homes with 5 or more persons in the household. As of 2000, there were 1,354 private households (homes and apartments) in the municipality, and an average of 2.5 persons per household. In 2008 there were 704 single family homes (or 46.0% of the total) out of a total of 1,529 homes and apartments. There were a total of 0 empty apartments for a 0.0% vacancy rate. As of 2007, the construction rate of new housing units was 2.8 new units per 1000 residents.

In the 2007 federal election the most popular party was the SVP which received 39.26% of the vote. The next three most popular parties were the SP (19.43%), the FDP (11.71%) and the EVP Party (8.83%). In the federal election, a total of 1,202 votes were cast, and the voter turnout was 44.3%.

The historical population is given in the following table:

Historical population
Year	Pop.	±%
1850	2,249	—
1888	2,069	−8.0%
1900	2,229	+7.7%
1950	2,972	+33.3%
1990	3,158	+6.3%
2000	3,400	+7.7%

== Economy ==
As of 2007, Brittnau had an unemployment rate of 2%. As of 2005, there were 152 people employed in the primary economic sector and about 61 businesses involved in this sector. 93 people are employed in the secondary sector and there are 22 businesses in this sector. 390 people are employed in the tertiary sector, with 81 businesses in this sector.

In 2000 there were 1,785 workers who lived in the municipality. Of these, 1,435 or about 80.4% of the residents worked outside Brittnau while 263 people commuted into the municipality for work. There were a total of 613 jobs (of at least 6 hours per week) in the municipality. Of the working population, 8.5% used public transportation to get to work, and 55.3% used a private car.

== Religion ==
From the 2000 census, 723 or 21.3% were Roman Catholic, while 2,240 or 65.9% belonged to the Swiss Reformed Church. Of the rest of the population, there were 7 individuals (or about 0.21% of the population) who belonged to the Christian Catholic faith.

== Education ==
The entire Swiss population is generally well educated. In Brittnau about 75.9% of the population (between age 25-64) have completed either non-mandatory upper secondary education or additional higher education (either university or a Fachhochschule). Of the school age population (in the 2008/2009 school year), there are 288 students attending primary school, there are 68 students attending secondary school, there are 102 students attending tertiary or university level schooling in the municipality.

Brittnau is home to the Schul-u.Gde.Bibliothek Brittnau (school and municipal library of Brittnau). The library has (as of 2008) 9,438 books or other media, and loaned out 19,036 items in the same year. It was open a total of 130 days with average of 6 hours per week during that year.
