= Winikon =

- Former municipality
- Coat of arms
- Location of Winikon
- Location within Switzerland Location within Canton of Lucerne
- Coordinates: 47°14′N 8°3′E
- Country: Switzerland
- Canton: Lucerne
- District: Sursee

Area
  - Total: 7.57 km^{2} (2.92 sq mi)
- Elevation: 501 m (1,644 ft)

Population (December 2007)
  - Total: 744
  - Density: 98.3/km^{2} (255/sq mi)
- Time zone: UTC+01:00 (CET)
  - Summer (DST): UTC+02:00 (CEST)
- Postal code: 6235
- SFOS number: 1106
- ISO 3166 code: CH-LU
- Surrounded by: Dagmersellen, Knutwil, Reiden, Reitnau (AG), Triengen
- Website: www.winikon.ch

Winikon is a municipality in the district of Sursee in the canton of Lucerne in Switzerland.

On 1 January 2009 Winikon merged into the municipality of Triengen, the combined municipality is called Triengen.

== Geography ==
Winikon has an area of 7.6 km^{2} (2.9 sq mi). Of this area, 63.8% is used for agricultural purposes, while 29.3% is forested. The rest of the land, (6.8%) is settled.

== Demographics ==
Winikon has a population (as of 2007) of 744, of which 7.3% are foreign nationals. Over the last 10 years the population has decreased at a rate of -3.8%. Most of the population (as of 2000) speaks German (93.3%), with Albanian being second most common ( 2.9%) and French being third ( 0.9%).

In the 2007 election the most popular party was the SVP which received 36% of the vote. The next three most popular parties were the FDP (29.4%), the CVP (25.8%) and the Green Party (6.1%).

The age distribution of the population (as of 2000) is children and teenagers (0–19 years old) make up 32.1% of the population, while adults (20–64 years old) make up 58.8% and seniors (over 64 years old) make up 9.1%. In Winikon about 63.9% of the population (between age 25-64) have completed either non-mandatory upper secondary education or additional higher education (either University or a Fachhochschule).

Winikon has an unemployment rate of 1.04%. As of 2005, there were 80 people employed in the primary economic sector and about 31 businesses involved in this sector. 176 people are employed in the secondary sector and there are 13 businesses in this sector. 34 people are employed in the tertiary sector, with 11 businesses in this sector.
