= Zofingen =

- Municipality
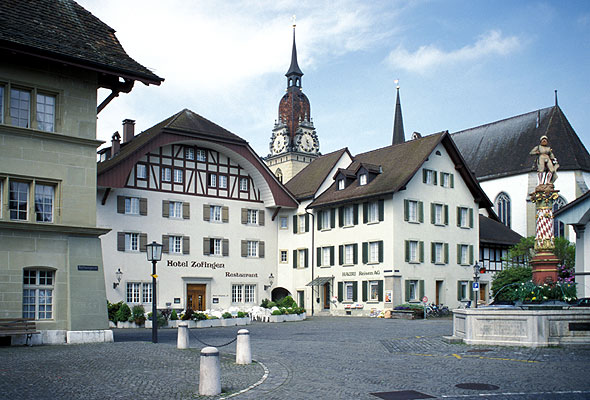

- Flag Coat of arms
- Location of Zofingen
- Location within Switzerland Location within Canton of Aargau
- Coordinates: 47°17′N 7°56′E
- Country: Switzerland
- Canton: Aargau
- District: Zofingen

Government
  - Mayor: Stadtammann (list); André Kirchhofer The Liberals (Switzerland) (as of 2026)

Area
  - Total: 11.09 km^{2} (4.28 sq mi)
- Elevation: 439 m (1,440 ft)

Population (December 2006)
  - Total: 10,534
  - Density: 949.9/km^{2} (2,460/sq mi)
- Time zone: UTC+01:00 (CET)
  - Summer (DST): UTC+02:00 (CEST)
- Postal code: 4800
- SFOS number: 4289
- ISO 3166 code: CH-AG
- Surrounded by: Bottenwil, Brittnau, Oftringen, Safenwil, Strengelbach, Uerkheim, Wikon (LU)
- Website: www.zofingen.ch

Zofingen (French: Zofingue) is a municipality and a town in the canton of Aargau in Switzerland. It is the capital of the district of Zofingen. Zofingen is a walled town and home to a medieval monastic settlement.

== History ==
Aerial view (1955)

In ancient times Zofingen was a settlement of the Celtic Helvetii. In later times the Romans built a manor. The Alemanni settled in the 6th century and formed one of the oldest parishes in Aargau. In the 11th century the House of Frohburg founded a canons monastery. The town was founded in 1201 by the counts of Frohburg. 1231 was the first written mention of Zofingen, which in 1299 came into the possession of the Habsburgs. In 1415 the Bernese conquered the city and in 1528 they introduced the Reformation. Since 1803 Zofingen has belonged to the canton of Aargau and has become a regional center. The neighboring Mühlethal was incorporated in 2002.

== Geography ==
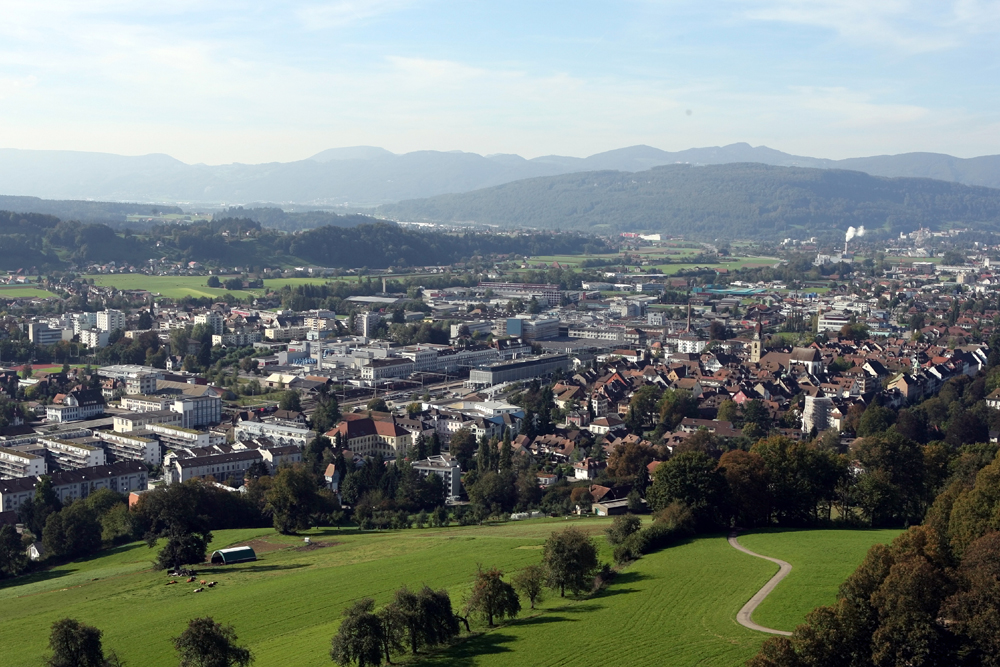
Zofingen

Zofingen has an area, as of 2009, of 11.09 square kilometers (4.28 sq mi). Of this area, 2.08 km^{2} (0.80 sq mi) or 18.8% is used for agricultural purposes, while 5.25 km^{2} (2.03 sq mi) or 47.3% is forested. Of the rest of the land, 3.67 km^{2} (1.42 sq mi) or 33.1% is settled (buildings or roads), 0.07 km^{2} (17 acres) or 0.6% is either rivers or lakes.

Of the built up area, industrial buildings made up 4.6% of the total area while housing and buildings made up 17.7% and transportation infrastructure made up 7.0%. while parks, green belts and sports fields made up 3.1%. Out of the forested land, 46.0% of the total land area is heavily forested and 1.4% is covered with orchards or small clusters of trees. Of the agricultural land, 4.3% is used for growing crops and 12.2% is pastures, while 2.3% is used for orchards or vine crops. All the water in the municipality is flowing water.

The municipality of Uerkheim is considering a merger on 1 January 2014 into Zofingen.

== Coat of arms ==
The blazon of the municipal coat of arms is Barry of Four Gules and Argent.

== Demographics ==
Zofingen has a population (as of December 2020) of 12,104. As of June 2009, 15.8% of the population are foreign nationals. Over the last 10 years (1997–2007) the population has changed at a rate of 14.7%. Most of the population (as of 2000) speaks German (88.9%), with Italian being second most common ( 3.4%) and Portuguese being third ( 1.4%).

The age distribution, as of 2008, in Zofingen is; 895 children or 8.4% of the population are between 0 and 9 years old and 1,010 teenagers or 9.5% are between 10 and 19. Of the adult population, 1,525 people or 14.3% of the population are between 20 and 29 years old. 1,607 people or 15.0% are between 30 and 39, 1,678 people or 15.7% are between 40 and 49, and 1,381 people or 12.9% are between 50 and 59. The senior population distribution is 1,095 people or 10.2% of the population are between 60 and 69 years old, 894 people or 8.4% are between 70 and 79, there are 509 people or 4.8% who are between 80 and 89, and there are 93 people or 0.9% who are 90 and older.

The historical population is given in the following table:

== Housing ==
Historical population
Year	Pop.	±%
1975	8,887	—
1980	8,758	−1.5%
1990	8,653	−1.2%
2000	8,675	+0.3%
2008	10,687	+23.2%
2020	12,031	+12.6%

As of 2000, there were 554 homes with 1 or 2 persons in the household, 2,318 homes with 3 or 4 persons in the household, and 1,338 homes with 5 or more persons in the household. As of 2000, there were 4,328 private households (homes and apartments) in the municipality, and an average of 2.1 persons per household. In 2008 there were 1,318 single family homes (or 25.0% of the total) out of a total of 5,269 homes and apartments. There were a total of 54 empty apartments for a 1.0% vacancy rate. As of 2007, the construction rate of new housing units was 6.5 new units per 1000 residents.

As of 2003 the average price to rent an average apartment in Zofingen was 1063.57 Swiss francs (CHF) per month (US$850, £480, €680 approx. exchange rate from 2003). The average rate for a one-room apartment was 592.19 CHF (US$470, £270, €380), a two-room apartment was about 787.80 CHF (US$630, £350, €500), a three-room apartment was about 937.35 CHF (US$750, £420, €600) and a six or more room apartment cost an average of 1694.74 CHF (US$1360, £760, €1080). The average apartment price in Zofingen was 95.3% of the national average of 1116 CHF.

== Politics ==
In the 2007 federal election the most popular party was the SVP which received 27.78% of the vote. The next three most popular parties were the SP (23.15%), the FDP (17.17%) and the Green Party (9.73%). In the federal election, a total of 3,746 votes were cast, and the voter turnout was 48.7%.

=== Mayors of Zofingen ===
In office	Stadtammann	Party	Born/died	Notes
1914–1930	Hans Suter	FDP	(1860–1930)	
1930–1947	Hans Bertschi	FDP		
1948–1953	Adolf Lerch	FDP		
1954–1973	Walther Leber	FDP		
1974–1992	Willy Loretan	FDP		
1992–2006	Urs Locher	FDP		
2006-2021	Hans-Ruedi Hottiger	(independent)	(born 1953)	
2022-2025	Christiane Guyer	(Grüne)	(born 1963)	
2026-	André Kirchhofer	(FDP)		

== Heritage sites of national significance ==
There are ten buildings or sites that are listed as Swiss heritage sites of national significance. The oldest is the Roman era farm house with mosaic floors at Hirzeberg. The former armory at General-Guisan-Strasse 12 and the former Quarantine house (German: Siechenhaus) at Aarburgerstrasse 21 are also on the list. Three educational buildings; the municipal Schoolhouse at General-Guisan-Strasse 14, the Museum at General-Guisan-Strasse 18 and the city library (German: Stadtbibliothek Zofingen) at Hintere Hauptgasse 20, are on the list. The rest of the list includes; Heiternplatz (Heitern plaza), the small monastery (German: Klösterli) at Klösterligasse 2, The City Hall Building at Rathausgasse 4 and a dairy farm at Hintere Hauptstrasse 9, 14.

The entire village of Zofingen is designated as part of the Inventory of Swiss Heritage Sites.

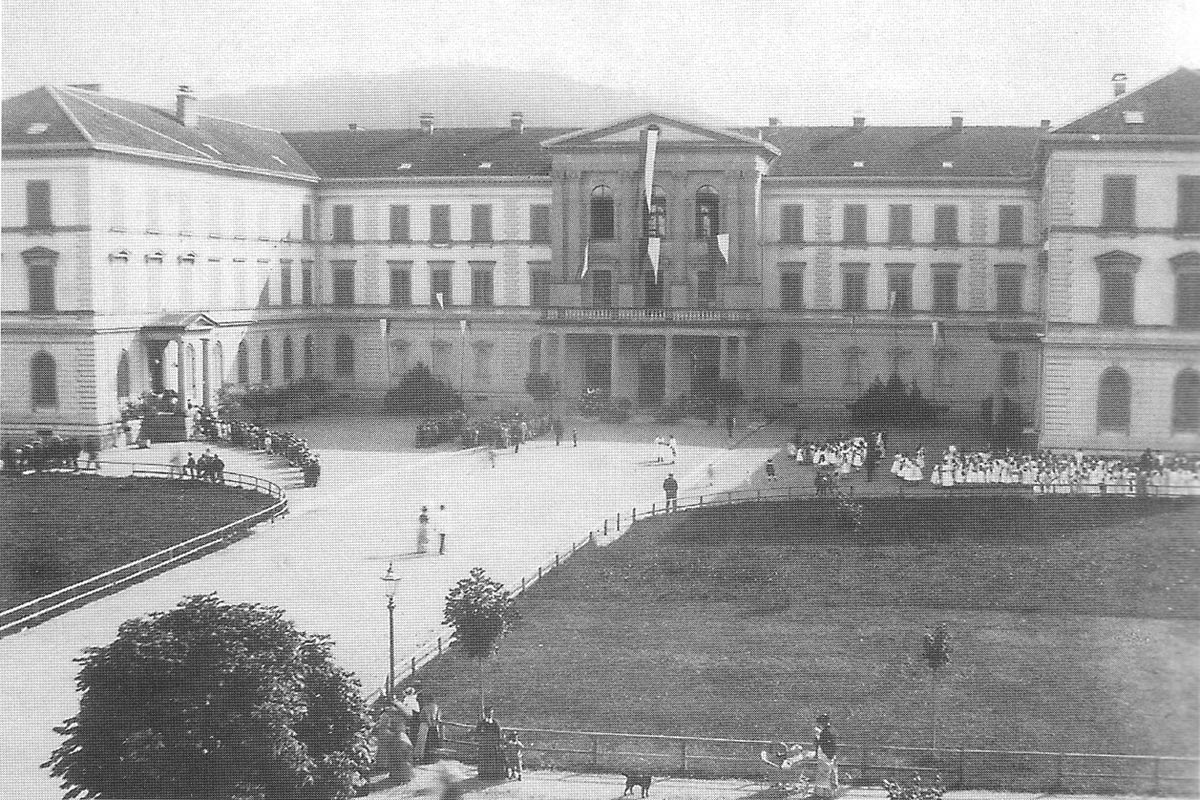
Municipal Schoolhouse in 1890

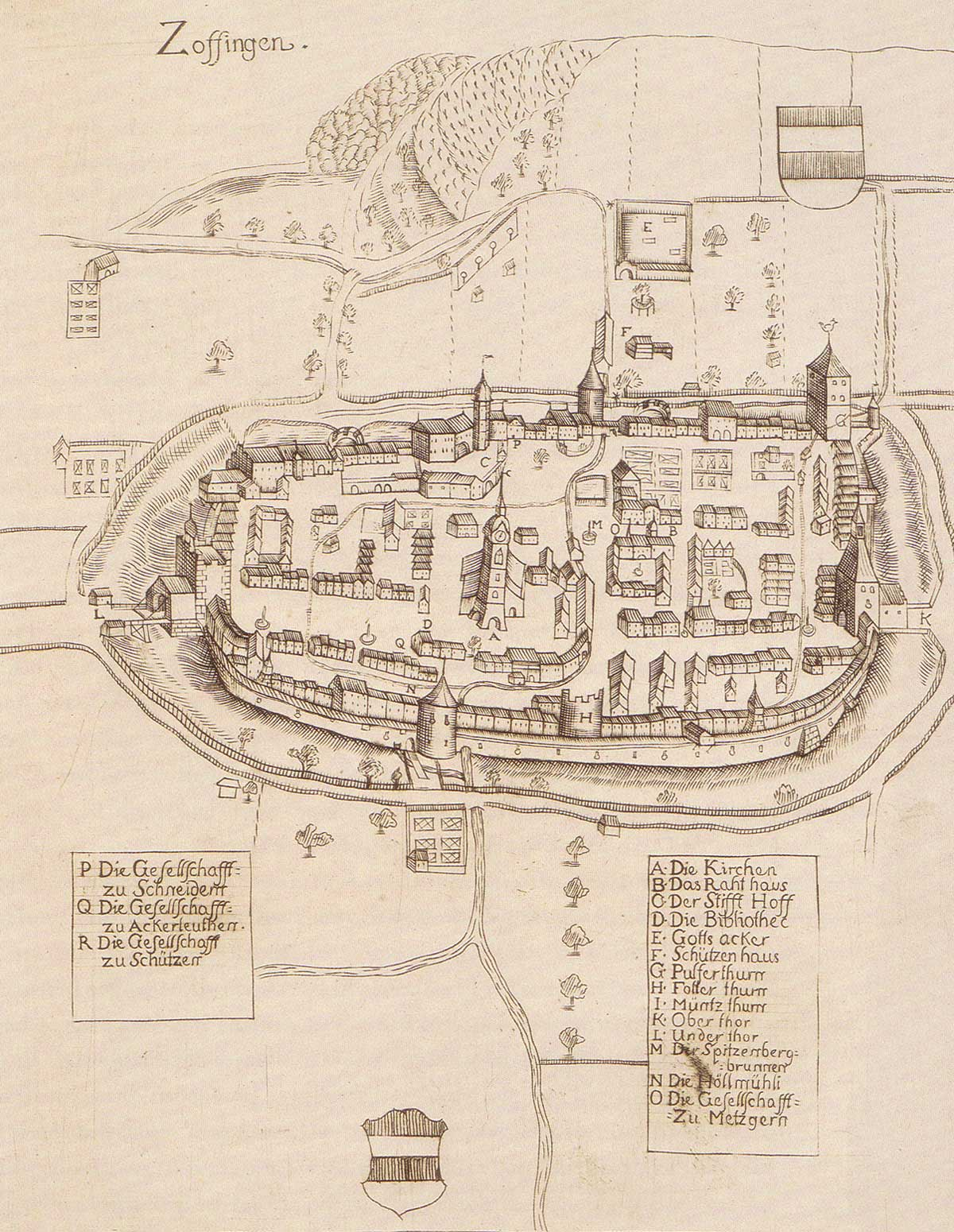
Zofingen in 1715 showing the compact, walled city

== Economy ==
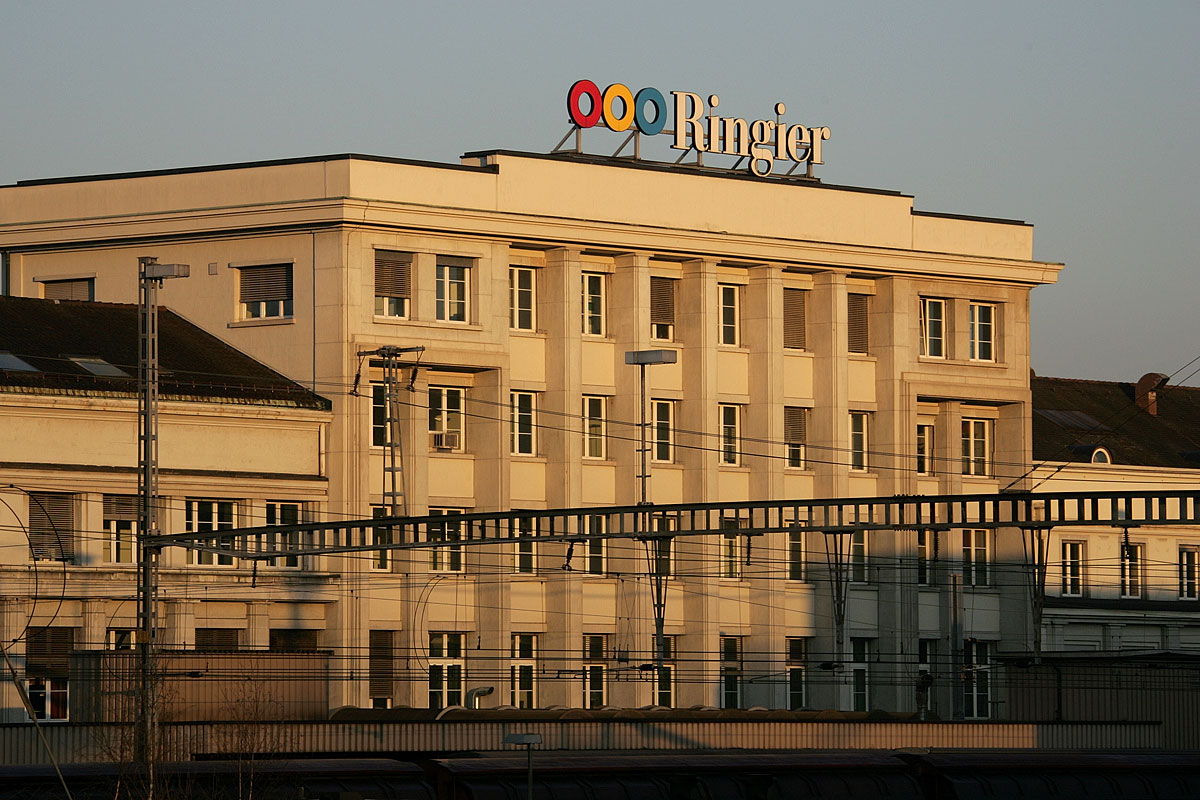
Headquarters of Ringier AG

Zofingen is home to several large companies. These include Ringier AG, one of the largest media corporations, Siegfried Ltd, a manufacturer for the pharmaceutical industry, and Muller Martini, a global company that manufactures print finishing systems.

As of 2007, Zofingen had an unemployment rate of 3.19%. As of 2005, there were 108 people employed in the primary economic sector and about 33 businesses involved in this sector. 4,236 people are employed in the secondary sector and there are 121 businesses in this sector. 4,514 people are employed in the tertiary sector, with 565 businesses in this sector.

In 2000 there were 4,377 workers who lived in the municipality. Of these, 2,352 or about 53.7% of the residents worked outside Zofingen while 6,538 people commuted into the municipality for work. There were a total of 8,563 jobs (of at least 6 hours per week) in the municipality. Of the working population, 14.2% used public transportation to get to work, and 45.3% used a private car.

== Religion ==
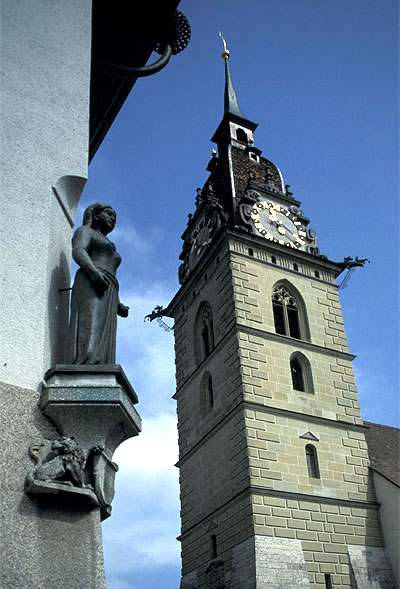
Zofingen downtown church

From the 2000 census, 2,879 or 30.5% were Roman Catholic, while 4,659 or 49.4% belonged to the Swiss Reformed Church. Of the rest of the population, there were 32 individuals (or about 0.34% of the population) who belonged to the Christian Catholic faith.

== Education ==
In Zofingen about 76.2% of the population (between age 25–64) have completed either non-mandatory upper secondary education or additional higher education (either university or a Fachhochschule). Of the school age population (in the 2008/2009 school year), there are 619 students attending primary school, there are 255 students attending secondary school, there are 378 students attending tertiary or university level schooling in the municipality.

Zofingen is home to 2 libraries. These libraries include; the Stadtbibliothek Zofingen and the Bildungszentrum Zofingen. There was a combined total (as of 2008) of 158,351 books or other media in the libraries, and in the same year a total of 222,191 items were loaned out.

== Sports ==
SC Zofingen is the city's football club.

For years, Zofingen hosts the World Championships Duathlon Long Distance.

== Notable people ==
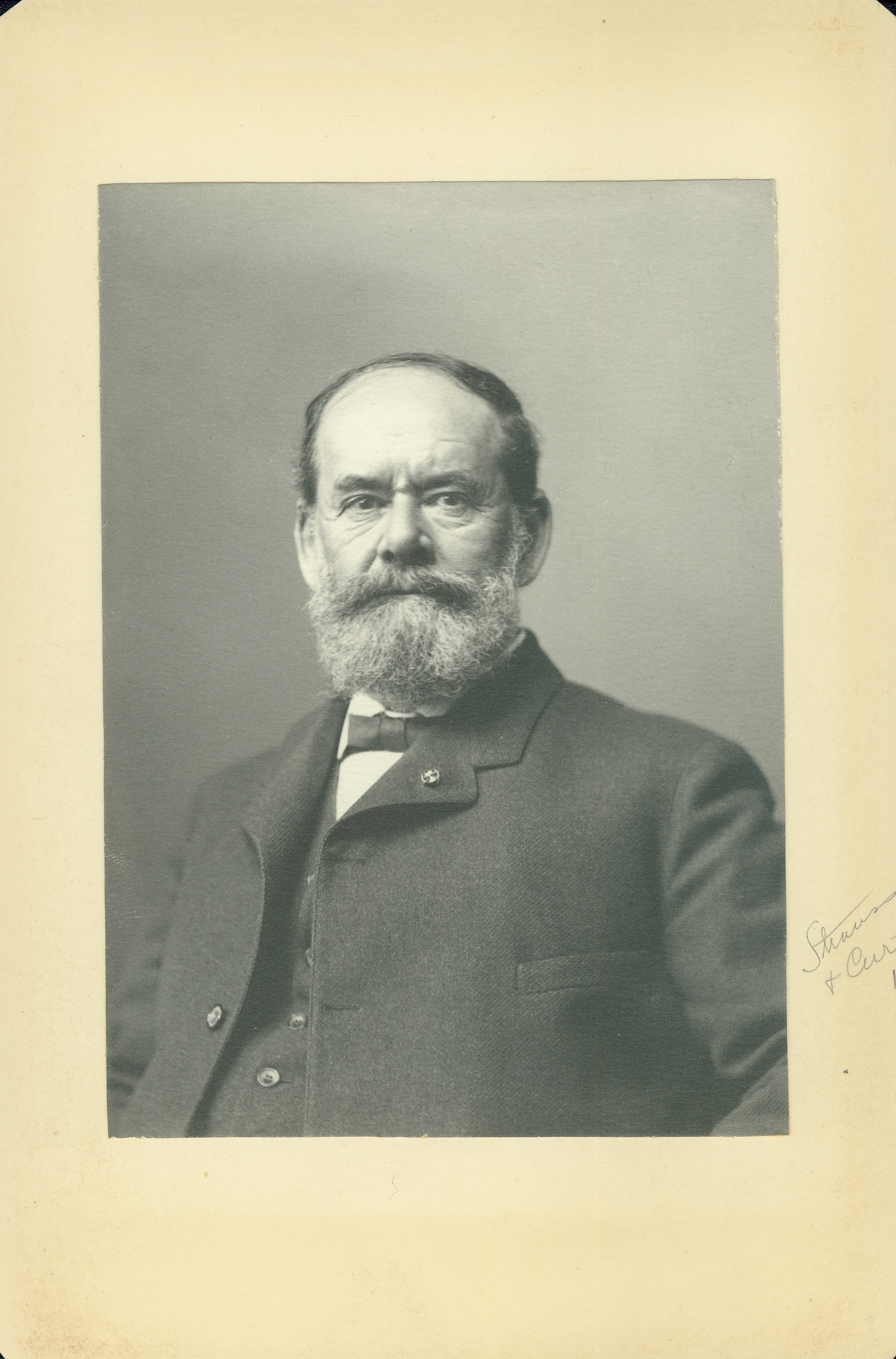
Arnold Sutermeister, ca. 1890

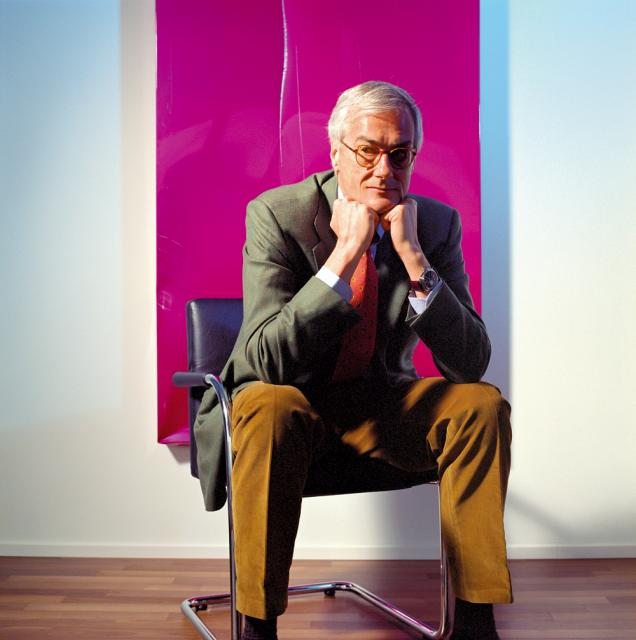
Michael Ringier, 2011

- Johann Lauffer (1752–1833) Curaçaoan gouvernor and businessman
- Rudolf Sutermeister (1802 – 1868 in Zofingen) a Swiss medical doctor for the poor, a businessman, a manufacturer, an early socialist and a socio-political writer
- Maria Gobat (1813 in Zofingen – August 1, 1879), Swiss missionary
- Friedrich Goll (1829 in Zofingen – 1903) a Swiss neuroanatomist
- Arnold Sutermeister (1830 in Zofingen – 1907) a Swiss-born Captain in the US Civil War where he commanded an artillery battery in the Western Theater
- Paul Niggli (1888 in Zofingen – 1953) a Swiss crystallographer, leader in the field of X-ray crystallography
- Hans Senn (1918 in Zofingen – 2007) a general officer of the Swiss Army
- Eva Aeppli (1925 in Zofingen – 2015) a Swiss artist.
- Erich von Däniken (born 1935 in Zofingen - 2026) a Swiss author of several books which claim extraterrestrial influence on early human culture
- Josef Imbach (born 1945 in Zofingen) a controversial Swiss Catholic theologian and Franciscan friar
- Michael Ringier (born 1949 in Zofingen) a Swiss publisher
- Vincenzo Aiutino (born 1970 in Zofingen) a Swiss-born French serial killer

Sport

- Sandra Cariboni (born 1963 in Zofingen) a Swiss former competitive figure skater in ladies' singles, competed in the 1984 Winter Olympics
- Debbie Marti (born 1968 in Zofingen) a former British high jumper, represented GB at the 1992 and 1996 Summer Olympics
- Andrea Fattizzo (born 1975 in Zofingen) a retired Italian footballer
