= Bon Baba Jan =

Bon Baba Jan بن باباجان
- Village
- Location within Iran
- Coordinates: 33°04′00″N 47°33′00″E
- Country: Iran
- Province: Ilam
- County: Darreh Shahr
- Bakhsh: Central
- Rural District: Aramu

Population (2006)
  - Total: 641
- Time zone: UTC+3:30 (IRST)
  - Summer (DST): UTC+4:30 (IRDT)

Bon Baba Jan (Persian: بن باباجان, also Romanized as Bon Bābā Jān) is a village in Aramu Rural District, in the Central District of Darreh Shahr County, Ilam Province, Iran. At the 2006 census, its population was 641, in 119 families. The village is populated by Lurs.
