= Jahadabad, Ilam =

Jahadabad جهاداباد
- Village
- Location within Iran
- Coordinates: 33°09′00″N 47°24′00″E
- Country: Iran
- Province: Ilam
- County: Darreh Shahr
- Bakhsh: Central
- Rural District: Aramu

Population (2006)
  - Total: 392
- Time zone: UTC+3:30 (IRST)
  - Summer (DST): UTC+4:30 (IRDT)

Jahadabad (Persian: جهاداباد, also Romanized as Jahādābād) is a village in Aramu Rural District, in the Central District of Darreh Shahr County, Ilam Province, Iran. At the 2006 census, its population was 392, in 77 families. The village is populated by Kurds.
