= Shahid Bahonar =

Shahid Bahonar (transl. Martyr Bahonar) may refer to the following, named after Iranian prime minister Mohammad-Javad Bahonar assassinated in the 1981 Iranian Prime Minister's office bombing:

- Shahid Bahonar, Ilam
- Shahid Bahonar, Ramhormoz, Khuzestan Province
- Shahid Bahonar, Shush, Khuzestan Province
- Shahid Bahonar, Lorestan
- Shahid Bahonar Stadium
- Shahid Bahonar University of Kerman

== See also ==
- Bahonar (disambiguation)
