= Kal-e Sefid, Ilam =

Kal-e Sefid كل سفيد
- Village
- Location within Iran
- Coordinates: 33°05′06″N 47°31′10″E
- Country: Iran
- Province: Ilam
- County: Darreh Shahr
- Bakhsh: Central
- Rural District: Aramu

Population (2006)
  - Total: 204
- Time zone: UTC+3:30 (IRST)
  - Summer (DST): UTC+4:30 (IRDT)

Kal-e Sefid (Persian: كل سفيد, also Romanized as Kal-e Sefīd and Kal Sefīd; also known as Kal-Esbi is a village in Aramu Rural District, in the Central District of Darreh Shahr County, Ilam Province, Iran. At the 2006 census, its population was 204, in 40 families. The village is populated by Kurds and Lurs.
