= Bahram-e Choobin Gorge =

Bahram Choobin Gorge
- تنگه بهرام چوبین (Persian)
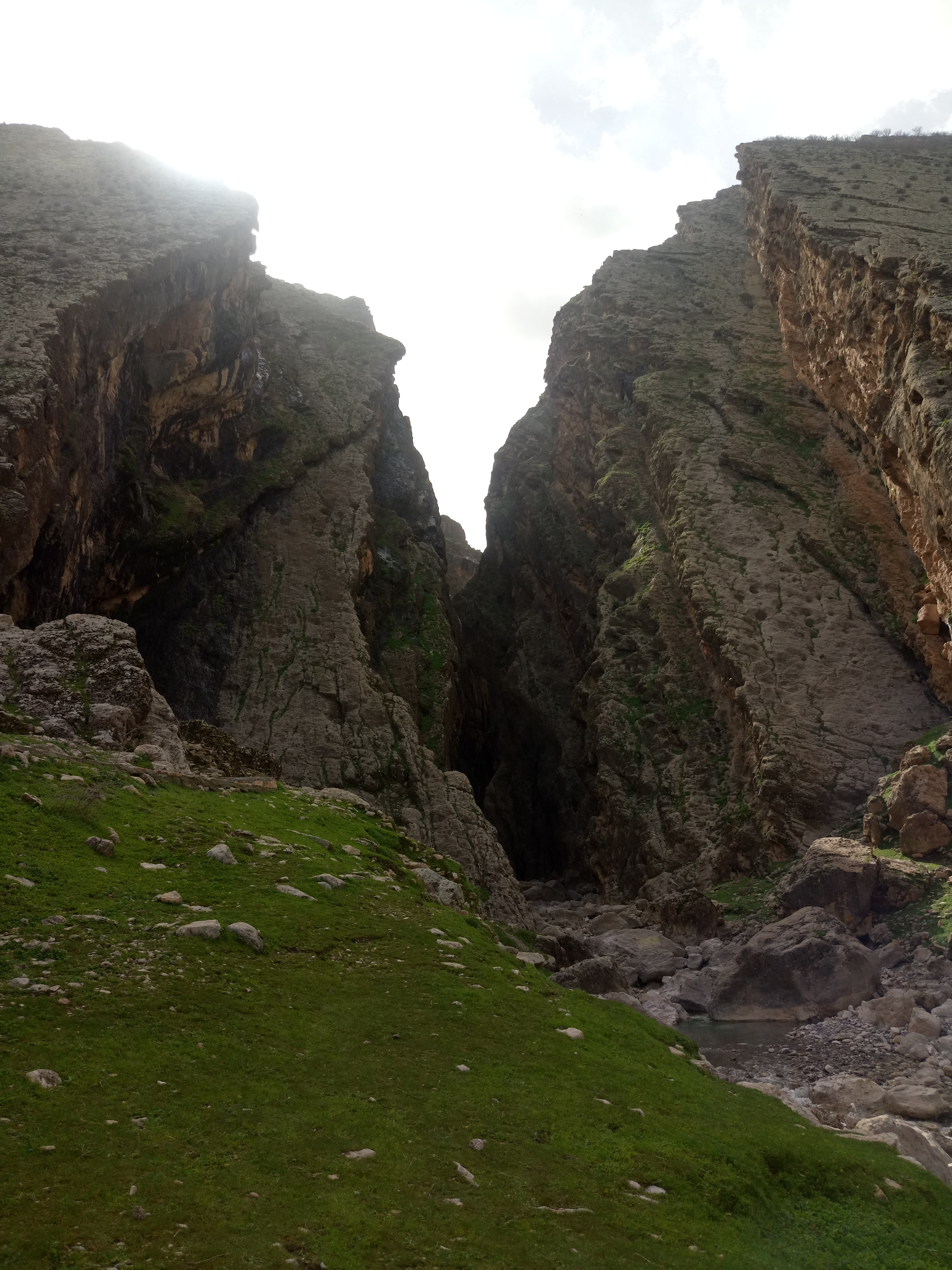
- Entrance of the gorge

- Location within Iran
- 33°05′05″N 47°27′08″E
- Location: Darreh Shahr County, Ilam province, Iran

History
- Built: late Sasanian Empire

Bahram-e Choobin Gorge is a historical and tourist site in the mountains of Kabir Kuh near Sheykh Makan village in Darreh Shahr County in Ilam province. The gorge is named after Bahram Chobin, a political leader of late Sasanian Empire and as its leader for about a year (r. 590–591). Based on historical accounts, Bahram Chobin took refuge in the gorge during the rebellion against Khosrow II.
