= Nasrollahabad-e Shahid Beheshti =

Nasrollahabad-e Shahid Beheshti نصراله اباد شهيدبهشتي
- Village
- Location within Iran
- Coordinates: 32°59′07″N 47°45′54″E
- Country: Iran
- Province: Ilam
- County: Darreh Shahr
- Bakhsh: Majin
- Rural District: Kulkani

Population (2006)
  - Total: 393
- Time zone: UTC+3:30 (IRST)
  - Summer (DST): UTC+4:30 (IRDT)

Nasrollahabad-e Shahid Beheshti (Persian: نصراله اباد شهيدبهشتي, also Romanized as Naşrollāhābād-e Shahīd Beheshtī; also known as Naşrollāhābād) is a village in Kulkani Rural District, Majin District, Darreh Shahr County, Ilam Province, Iran. At the 2006 census, its population was 393, living in 69 families. The village is inhabited by Lurs.
