= Chaleh Siah, Ilam =

Chaleh Siah روستای شهید سیکانی چاله سياه
- Village
- Location within Iran
- Coordinates: 33°08′55″N 47°19′59″E
- Country: Iran
- Province: Ilam
- County: Darreh Shahr
- Bakhsh: Central
- Rural District: Zarrin Dasht

Population (2006)
  - Total: 61
- Time zone: UTC+3:30 (IRST)
  - Summer (DST): UTC+4:30 (IRDT)

Chaleh Siah (Persian: چاله سياه, also Romanized as Chāleh Sīāh; also known as Sīkān and Sīkun) is a village in Zarrin Dasht Rural District, in the Central District of Darreh Shahr County, Ilam Province, Iran. At the 2006 census, its population was 61, in 17 families. The village is populated by Lurs.
