= Kabir Kouh Protected Area =

Nature reserve in Ilam Province, Iran

- منطقه حفاظت‌شده کبیرکوه
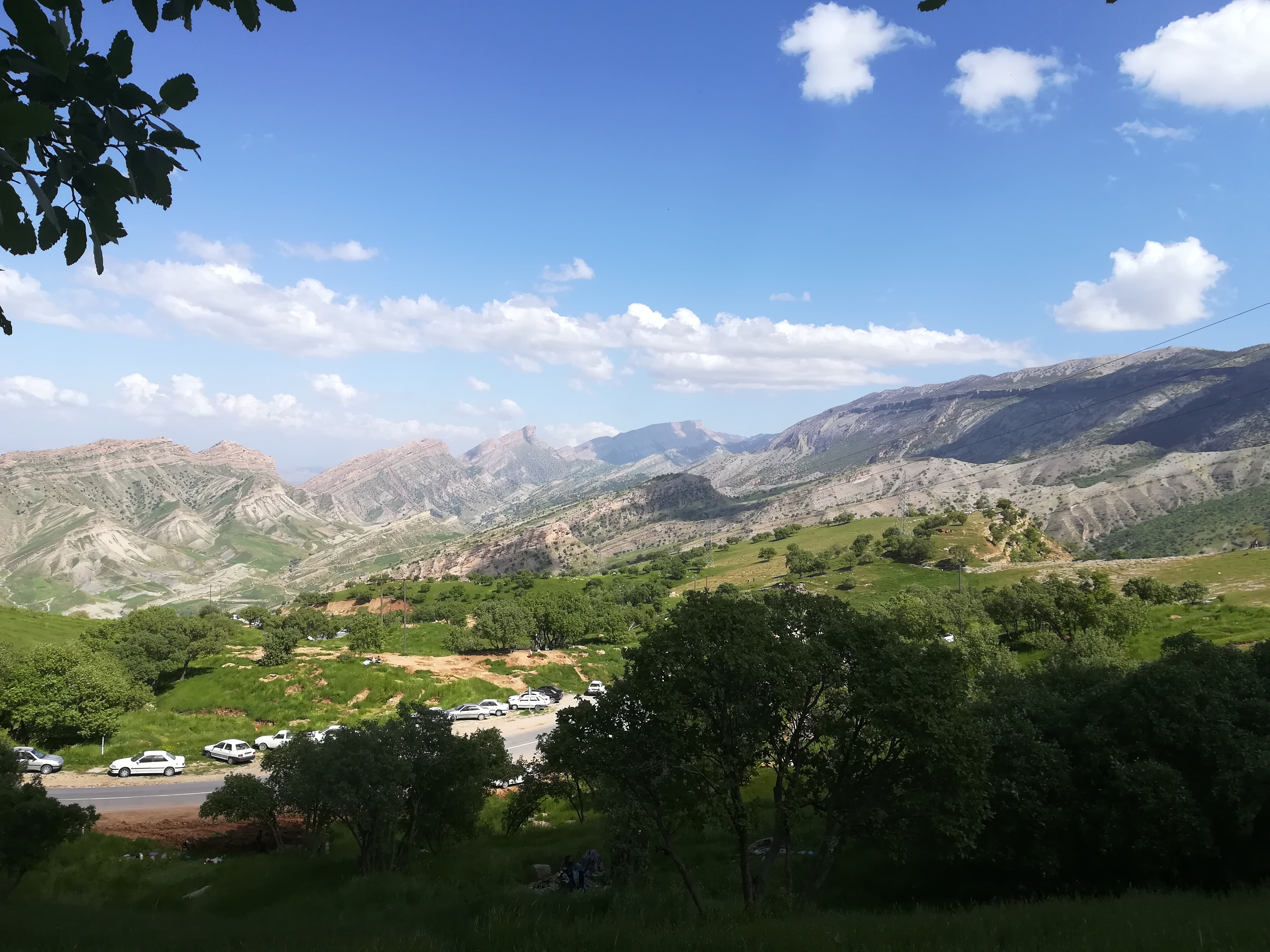
- Kabir Kouh in spring

- Location within Ilam Province
- Location: Darreh Shahr and Badreh
- Nearest city: Darreh Shahr and Badreh
- Coordinates: 33.21°N 47.21°E
- Area: 179 km^{2} (69 sq mi)
- Established: October 17, 2001
- Governing body: FRW of Ilam Province

Kabir Kouh Protected Area is a nature conservatory in Darreh Shahr and Badreh counties, Ilam Province, Iran. Established in October 2001, it covers an area of 179 km^{2} (69 mi^{2}) on the northern side of Kabir Kouh range between the elevations of 950 and 2,790 m (3,120 and 9,150 ft).

The area is mostly mountainous with steep slopes, a rocky base and shallow soil. Water stream are prevalent in the area.

== Geology ==
Kabir Kou Protected Area is located in the Zagros Mountains. Its lithology is generally composed of sedimentary rocks and this has played an important role in the emergence and evolution of vegetation and the biodiversity of the region and the formation of wildlife habitats. The geological units and existing deposits, due to lateral pressures on both sides of the northeastern and southwest, have become folded into a set of anti-knives. As a result, there have been numerous dangers and diversions that actually form the mountains and valleys of the area.

== Climate ==
The average long-term annual precipitation is 350.4 mm (13.80 in), 99 percent of which comes in the period of December to May.

For every 1,000 m (3,300 ft), precipitation increases by 162 mm (6.4 in) and the average temperature decreases by 5.8 °C.

The average annual maximum temperature varies between 15 and 30 °C (59 and 86 °F) at different altitudes and the average annual minimum temperature between −2 and 16 °C (28 and 61 °F). The maximum and minimum absolute temperatures ever recorded are 47 and −15 °C. The average maximum and minimum temperatures are 21.7 and 11.6 °C.

The average annual relative humidity of the region is 47.1 percent. August has the lowest and February the highest relative humidity.

== Flora ==
Most of the area is covered by forests and pastures. The vegetation in area varies, the farther it is from settlements, the richer the vegetation gets. Due to excessive exploitation, the soil has been subject to erosion in many areas and many gullies have been forming. The deforestation is also prevalent in the region as people use the tree forage for their livestock. Nevertheless, ever since the establishment of the protected area, the degradation has been slowing down.

== Fauna ==
Due to its special rocky landscape, steep slopes and high cliffs, the area is home to a diverse range of inhabitants. A full wildlife descriptions of the region requires further studies.
