= Fathabad, Ilam =

Neighborhood in Ilam province, Iran

Fathabad Persian: فتح اباد
- Neighborhood
- Location within Iran Location within Ilam Province
- Country: Iran
- Province: Ilam
- County: Darreh Shahr
- District: Mazhin
- City: Mazhin

Population (2011)
  - Total: 63
- Time zone: UTC+3:30 (IRST)

Fathabad (Persian: فتح اباد), (Note: Also romanized as Fatḩābād) is a neighborhood in the city of Mazhin in Mazhin District of Darreh Shahr County, Ilam province, Iran.

== Demographics ==
=== Ethnicity ===
The neighborhood is populated by Lurs.

=== Population ===
At the time of the 2006 National Census, Fathabad's population was 60 in 12 households, when it was a village in Mazhin Rural District. The following census in 2011 counted 63 people in 17 households.

After the census, the village of Mirza Hoseynabad merged with the villages of Fathabad, Hamgam, Heyderabad, and Irajabad to form the new city of Mazhin.
