= Kolahjub-e Olya =

Kolahjub-e Olya (Persian: كله جوب عليا) may refer to:

- Kolahjub-e Olya, Ilam
- Kolah Jub-e Olya, Kermanshah
