= Shirez Canyon =

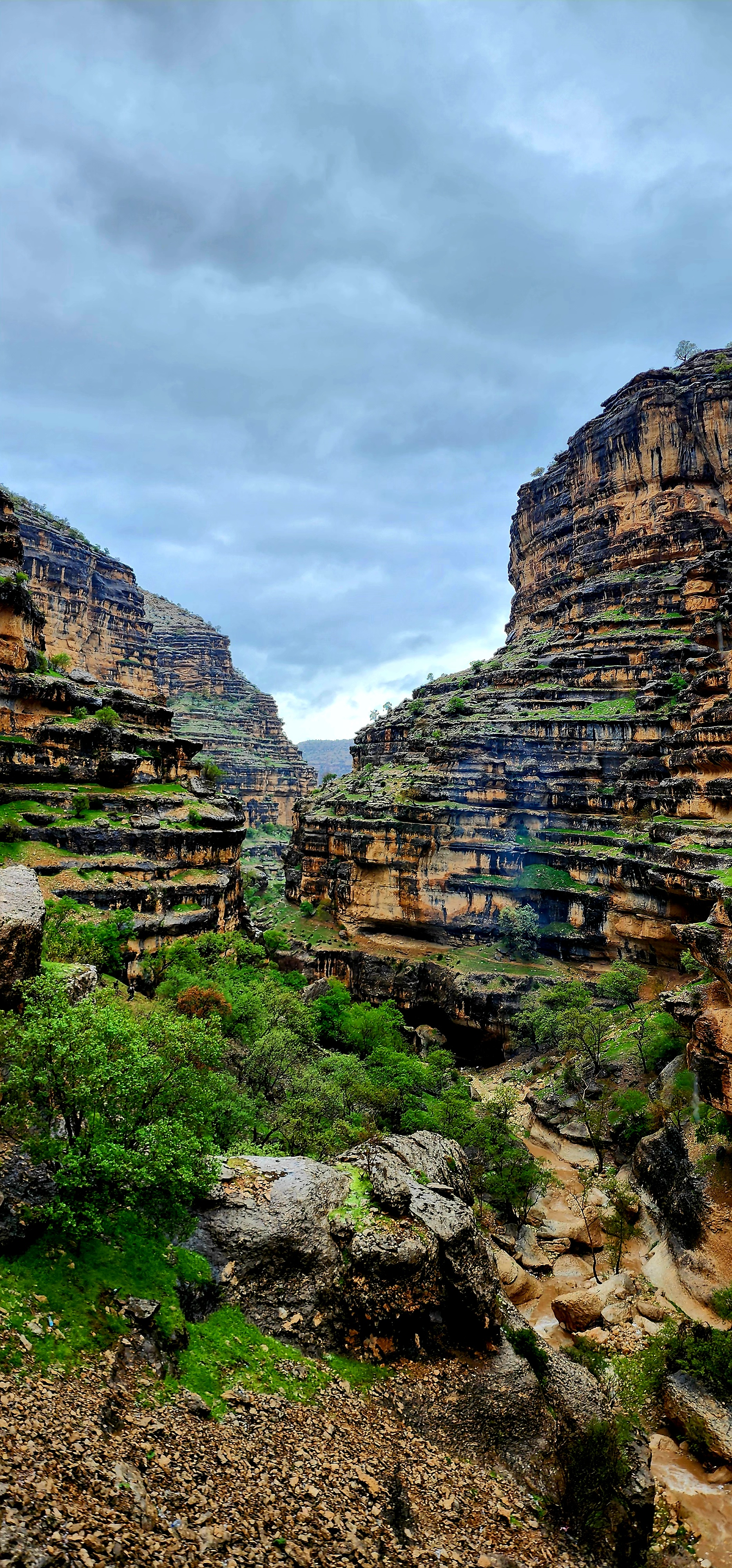
- Shirez Canyon, Kuhdasht.

Geography
- Location: Lurestan, Iran
- Coordinates: 33.8240348°N 47.5109165°E
- Rivers: Seimare, Karkhen River
- Interactive map of Shirez Canyon

The Shirez Canyon (Persian: تنگه شیرز Tange Širez, Laki: تنگ شیرز /tæŋ ʃɪrəz/, Southern Kurdish: تەنگ شیرز Tengi Şîriz) is a canyon of geotouristic importance, located 45 kilometers northeast of Kuhdasht, the capital of Kuhdasht County, in the province of Lorestan, western Iran.

The valley's springs join the stream of Seimare, which is a branch of the Karkhen River.

== Formation ==
Shirez canyon with all its beauties is in the heart of the Zagros Mountains. The valley is eroded with sedimentary rocks belonging to the third geological Devon.

== Historical and geographical value ==
Shirez canyon in Lorestan also has ancient sites of the Stone Age.
