= Meydan Khalaf =

Village in Ilam province, Iran

Meydan Khalaf Persian: ميدان خلف
- Village
- Location within Iran Location within Ilam Province
- Coordinates: 32°57′00″N 47°49′56″E
- Country: Iran
- Province: Ilam
- County: Darreh Shahr
- District: Mazhin
- Rural District: Mazhin

Population (2016)
  - Total: 327
- Time zone: UTC+3:30 (IRST)

Meydan Khalaf (Persian: ميدان خلف) (Note: Also romanized as Meydān Khalaf; also known as Meydān Ghalaf) is a village in, and the capital of, Mazhin Rural District of Mazhin District, Darreh Shahr County, Ilam province, Iran. The previous capital of the rural district was the village of Mazhin, now a city.

== Demographics ==
=== Ethnicity ===
The village is populated by Lurs.

=== Population ===
At the time of the 2006 National Census, the village's population was 419 in 82 households. The following census in 2011 counted 371 people in 82 households. The 2016 census measured the population of the village as 327 people in 87 households. It was the most populous village in its rural district.
