= Shahid Bahonar, Ilam =

Shahid Bahonar شهيدباهنر
- Village
- Location within Iran
- Coordinates: 32°59′28″N 47°45′38″E
- Country: Iran
- Province: Ilam
- County: Darreh Shahr
- Bakhsh: Majin
- Rural District: Kulkani

Population (2006)
  - Total: 172
- Time zone: UTC+3:30 (IRST)
  - Summer (DST): UTC+4:30 (IRDT)

Shahid Bahonar (Persian: شهيدباهنر, also Romanized as Shahīd Bāhonar) is a village in Kulkani Rural District, Majin District, Darreh Shahr County, Ilam Province, Iran. At the 2006 census, its population was 172, in 33 families. The village is populated by Lurs.
