= Nasrollahabad =

Nasrollahabad (Persian: نصراله اباد) may refer to:

- Nasrollahabad, Fuman, Gilan Province
- Nasrollahabad, Rasht, Gilan Province
- Nasrollahabad, Ilam
- Nasrollahabad, Khuzestan
