= Dashtabad-e Olya =

Village in Ilam province, Iran

Dashtabad-e Olya Persian: دشت ابادعليا
- Village
- Location within Iran Location within Ilam Province
- Coordinates: 33°10′30″N 47°21′18″E
- Country: Iran
- Province: Ilam
- County: Darreh Shahr
- District: Central
- Rural District: Zarrindasht

Population (2016)
  - Total: 600
- Time zone: UTC+3:30 (IRST)

Dashtabad-e Olya (Persian: دشت ابادعليا) (Note: Also romanized as Dashtābād-e ‘Olyā; also known as Dashtābād) is a village in, and the capital of, Zarrindasht Rural District of the Central District of Darreh Shahr County, Ilam province, Iran.

== Demographics ==
=== Ethnicity ===
The village is populated by Kurds.

=== Population ===
At the time of the 2006 National Census, the village's population was 461 in 97 households. The following census in 2011 counted 656 people in 180 households. The 2016 census measured the population of the village as 600 people in 173 households.
