= Darrehshahr =

City in Ilam province, Iran

Darrehshahr Persian: دره‌شهر
- City
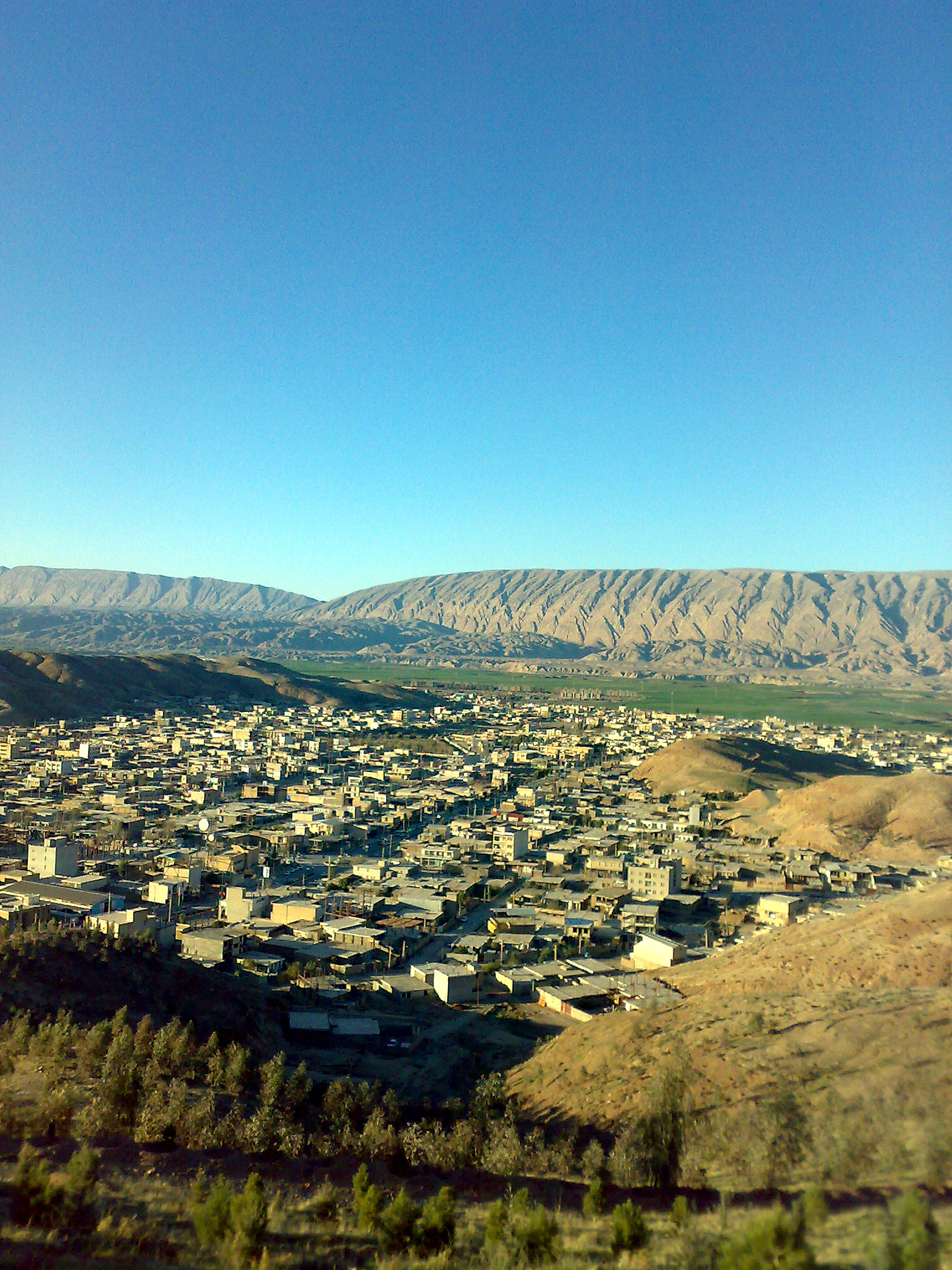
- City view to the North
- Etymology: دره ("valley") and شهر ("city"). Historically known as Madaktu, Seymareh and Mehreghan
- Location within Iran Location within Ilam province
- Coordinates: 33°08′35″N 47°22′46″E
- Country: Iran
- Province: Ilam
- County: Darreh Shahr
- District: Central
- Incorporated: 1964
- Neighborhoods: List: City Center

Government
  - Governor: Aliakbar Shafizadeh
  - Mayor: Abbas Derikvand
  - City Council: Abdol Karam-khodaei

Area
  - City: 3.05 km^{2} (1.18 sq mi)
- Elevation: 660 m (2,170 ft)
- Highest elevation: 695 m (2,280 ft)
- Lowest elevation: 635 m (2,083 ft)

Population (2016)
  - Urban: 21,900

Linguistics
  - Language(s): Kurdish, Luri
- Time zone: UTC+03:30 (IRST)
- Postal code: 69611 to 69691
- Area code: +98 84 3522
- ISO 3166 code: IR-05
- Vehicle registration: ٩٨ ط
- Website: darehshahr.portal-il.ir

Darrehshahr (Persian: دره شهر) (Note: Also romanized as Darreh Shahr and Darreh-ye Shahr; also known as Dar-i Shahr) is a city in the Central District of Darreh Shahr County, Ilam province, Iran, serving as capital of both the county and the district. Darrehshahr is in the southeastern part of the province, in the northern foothills of the Kabir Kuh ranges. According to the 2016 census there are 21,900 residents, making it the second-largest city in the province.

== History ==
It is believed that Darrehshahr was once Madaktu, an important city in the Anshan Province of Elamite Kingdom with a population of about 74,000. The Elamite Kingdom had three important cities: Susa, Hidali and Madaktu. Madaktu served as an advance post toward Mesopotamia. The city was destroyed in 693 BC by Ashurbanipal during the Assyrian conquest of Elam.

Madaktu saw many ups and down during centuries. After the Assyrian conquest, the city went into ruins and lost its significance. It did not regain its prosperity in the Achaemenid Empire. The Parthians era was a period of relative revival but it was during the Sasanian Empire that the city, then a settlement of about 5000 household and renamed to Seymareh, saw its utmost restoration and success. Nowadays, the ruins of Madaktu is abound with artifacts from that era, most of which are in display in Darrehshahr Museum.

In ancient times, Elamites governed the Lorestan mountains and constructed several strong buildings. Darrehshahr was the first Elamite city attacked and destroyed by Assyrians in addition to the massacre of people. In Seymareh Valley the remains of the Sassanid monuments are still present; hence Darrehshahr might have been a thriving city in the Sassanid and the Parthian periods. Furthermore, some foreign experts call the unearthed city as the second and lost capital of the Seleucids while some Iranian archaeologists believe that the monuments are part of the state of Sirvan. Referencing some resources and texts, Darrehshahr may be the same as Mihrajanqadhaq, Saabzaan, Seymareh or the city of Khosrau II in the late Sassanid period completely leveled to earth from an earthquake in the years 248 and 344 A.H.

Despite the fact that there is no strong and reliable evidence to show the first time human beings settled in this area, most historians believe that Madakto Ancient City as a city in Sassanid era and because of its proximity to Ctesiphon was in fact a summer capital for kings in that era. Historians also believe the city was founded by Khosrau II. The great and impregnable fortress in east of Ctesiphon mountains that Khosrau II built to protect his family when threatened is believed to be in Darrehshahr as well.

Hormozan, a ruling king of Sassanid era was from Mehrgan Kade. The city gained its popularity again in Islamic era and was known as Seymareh. There are several archaeological sites round the city that are clear evidences of the importance of this city in ancient times: Bahram Choobin Gorge, Darrehshahr Fire Temple, Gavmishan Bridge, Jam Namesht Bridge, Koozeh Garan Hill, Majeen Ancient City, Majeen Gorge, Sassanid Bridge, Sheikh Makan Fort and Tikhan Hill.

Darreh Shahr was officially declared a county in 1343 SH (1964–1965). The county has two districts, the Central District and Mazhin District. The city of Darrehshahr is in the Central District.

The modern-day Darrehshahr was part of Lorestan province. In 1964, some areas of Lorestan and Khuzestan provinces were annexed to create Ilam Governorate-General and was declared a province ten years later in 1974.

== Demographics ==
=== Ethnicity ===
Darreh Shahr is populated by Kurds and Lurs.

== Population ==
Historical population
Year	Pop.	±%
1976	2,292	—
1986	8,831	+285.3%
1991	12,591	+42.6%
1991	14,668	+16.5%
2006	18,214	+24.2%
2011	20,712	+13.7%
2016	21,900	+5.7%
Source: Statistical Center of Iran

At the time of the 2006 national census, the city's population was 18,214 in 3,851 households. The following census in 2011 counted 20,712 people in 5,190 households. The 2016 census measured the population of the city as 21,900 people in 5,988 households.

The city reports 30.7% of the population is under the age of 19, 7.9% from 19 to 24, 39.3% from 24 to 45, 17.7% from 45 to 65 and 4.3% over the age of 65.

== Geography ==
=== Location ===
The town is at the foot of Kabir Kouh range and is situated along the Darrehshahr River, which flows from the mountains, northeast, into Seymareh River.

Except to the northeast, which is mostly flat farmlands extending to the Seymareh River, the town is surrounded by hills and mountains, hence the name of the town which is literally translated "valley city".

The elevation of the town varies from 635 m (2,083 ft) in the northeast to 695 m (2,280 ft) in the southwest areas which are closer to the mountains.

=== Climate ===
Darrehshahr

Climate chart (precipitation, max. and min. temperature)
J	F	M	A	M	J	J	A	S	O	N	D
70 10 −1	72 12 1	49 17 4	56 23 8	11 28 12	0.2 35 16	0.1 39 20	0.1 39 20	1 34 14	26 27 10	57 18 5	60 12 1
- █ Average max. and min. temperatures in °C
- █ Precipitation totals in mm
Imperial conversion
J	F	M	A	M	J	J	A	S	O	N	D
2.7 50 30	2.8 54 34	1.9 63 39	2.2 73 46	0.4 83 53	0 95 61	0 102 68	0 102 68	0 93 58	1 80 50	2.2 65 41	2.4 53 34
- █ Average max. and min. temperatures in °F
- █ Precipitation totals in inches

Darrehshahr, is located in southwestern Iran, in Ilam province. It is 125 km (78 mi) southeast of Ilam city, 160 km (99 mi) west of Khorramabad, and 165 km (103 mi) northwest of Dezful.

Darrehshahr has very hot and dry summers and mild and wet winters with long-term average of 455.2 mm (17.92 in) precipitation, almost all of which come in form of rain during winter.

Darrehshahr experiences mild winters and very hot summers. It is among the hottest cities in Iran; temperatures can go as high as 48 °C (118 °F) in summers. January and December are the coldest months, in which temperatures occasionally go below freezing overnight.

The average long-term annual precipitation is 455.2 mm (17.92 in). Almost all of which come in months of October to April and there is little to no precipitation from May to October. Snow is infrequent and has decreased in recent decades.

Climate data for Darrehshahr
Month	Jan	Feb	Mar	Apr	May	Jun	Jul	Aug	Sep	Oct	Nov	Dec	Year
Record high °C (°F)	20.8 (69.4)	25.6 (78.1)	29.6 (85.3)	34.4 (93.9)	42.2 (108.0)	46.6 (115.9)	49 (120)	48.8 (119.8)	46.6 (115.9)	38.4 (101.1)	30.2 (86.4)	25.6 (78.1)	49 (120)
Mean daily maximum °C (°F)	9.9 (49.8)	12.1 (53.8)	17.0 (62.6)	22.7 (72.9)	28.2 (82.8)	35.2 (95.4)	39.0 (102.2)	39.1 (102.4)	33.9 (93.0)	26.8 (80.2)	18.2 (64.8)	11.9 (53.4)	21.2 (70.2)
Daily mean °C (°F)	9.0 (48.2)	10.5 (50.9)	14.8 (58.6)	20.8 (69.4)	28.1 (82.6)	35.6 (96.1)	38.4 (101.1)	37.1 (98.8)	32.3 (90.1)	24.0 (75.2)	13.2 (55.8)	10.4 (50.7)	22.85 (73.13)
Mean daily minimum °C (°F)	−1.2 (29.8)	1.1 (34.0)	4.1 (39.4)	7.9 (46.2)	11.8 (53.2)	16.0 (60.8)	19.9 (67.8)	20.1 (68.2)	14.2 (57.6)	9.9 (49.8)	5.0 (41.0)	1.1 (34.0)	9.05 (48.29)
Record low °C (°F)	−4.4 (24.1)	−3.4 (25.9)	0.8 (33.4)	−2.6 (27.3)	8.8 (47.8)	10.8 (51.4)	20.0 (68.0)	21.6 (70.9)	12.0 (53.6)	6.0 (42.8)	−1.4 (29.5)	−3.2 (26.2)	−4.4 (24.1)
Average precipitation mm (inches)	69.5 (2.74)	72.0 (2.83)	49.2 (1.94)	55.9 (2.20)	11.4 (0.45)	0.2 (0.01)	0.1 (0.00)	0.1 (0.00)	1.0 (0.04)	25.5 (1.00)	56.9 (2.24)	60.2 (2.37)	402 (15.82)
Average precipitation days (≥ 1.0 mm)	9.	9.4	10.1	8.7	3.9	0.4	0.3	0.1	0.0	3.1	6.3	8.2	59.5
Average relative humidity (%)	59	66	55	37	34	20	21	23	27	31	63	67	42
Mean monthly sunshine hours	188.9	178.8	187.5	224.6	260.4	316.4	313.8	323.1	262.9	286.9	199.8	224.5	2,967.6
Source: I.R. of Iran Meteorological Organization

=== Floods ===
The city resides in the lower valleys of the Kabir Kuh ranges and has been built on the banks of the Darrehshahr river. Due to these factors, the city is prone to flooding. There has been severe incidents of flooding in the past.

The most recent case happened on 1 April 2019 following an extensive period of flooding all around the country. There were four major incidents: Golestan; Fars; Lorestan and Ilam; and Khuzestan provinces, respectively.

=== Division of the city of Darrehshahr ===
According to the circular of the Ministry of Interior to the municipalities in 1365 regarding the necessity of dividing urban areas, districts and localities and the notification of instructions on how to carry out this plan in 1367 and also following the comprehensive urban plan, the city of "Dare Shahr" is out of 7 regions. It consists of 18 districts, neighborhoods, districts and towns.

- 7 regions and regions:

1. Asadabad, 2. Qala Gol, 3. Sarkhabad, 4. Shahid Madani, 5. Bahmanabad 6. central district 7.Balashahr (western area of the city/Imam Khomeini Blvd.)

- "7 regions" consisting of "18 Koi", "Mohalla", "District" and "City" including: Sarkh Abad, Bahmanabad, Chal Zaghal, Urban lands, Camp, Hazardarb, Zalouab (sacrifices/veterans), Taleghani, Chal Zar, Motahari, Shahid Madani, Koi Farhangian phase 1 + Mahpareh, Farhangian phase 2 ([Alavi Quay]), Basijian/Rozmengedan (behind the road administration), city center, Balashahr (Imam Khomeini Blvd.) and newly built settlements Maskan Mehr and Shefa
- This division is done in order to achieve integrated urban management and improve the quality and increase the level of service to all parts of the city.

=== Parks ===
There are four parks in and around the city:

- Laleh Park is a very small park located on Imam Khomeini Blvd, yet it is the oldest in the city established before the Iranian revolution.
- Shahrdari Park, is a 2.75 ha (6.8 acres) green space on Imam Hossein Str.
- Kowsar Forest Park is a 60 ha (150 acres) man-made forest of Eucalyptus trees on the eastern hillsides of the city.
- Sarab is located 5 km out of the city and is built around the Sarab Spring which provides the drinking water for the city and nearby communities.

== Economy ==
=== Agriculture ===
Darrehshahr's economy is mainly based on agriculture, orchards and ranching. Water for agriculture purposes is supplied from wells, springs and the Seymareh river. Agricultural products include: wheat, barley, cucumber, cantaloupe, honeydew, watermelon, legume, corn, fodder, rice, sesame, vegetables, pomegranate, grapes, and fig.

=== Industry ===
Darrehshahr Industrial Park is located 11 km (6.8 mi) out of the city along the Darrehshahr-Pol-e Dokhtar road. There are still 17 small industries in the park.

=== Culture ===
Handicrafts are the main industry in Ilam province, including Darrehshahr. "Ilam carpet is one of the most distinguished carpets of our country." Alikhani, head of Iranian National Carpet Company said addressing the head of Ilam Industry, Mine and Trade Organization.

"Ilam includes top provinces in terms of the number of weavers. Its carpet is of optimum condition that is going to be developed more than ever by more protection." "Ilam carpet has a historic precedence and favorable capacities." Head of Ilam Industry, Mine and Trade Organization said.

The main handicraft products are hand-made rugs and carpets. Darrehshahr county has about 2,000 active weavers and they annually create about 1,200 m^{2} (13,000 sq ft) rugs and hand-made carpets.

Darrehshahr is host to the National Sornawa Festival, an annual music festival for Iranian folklore music. The festival is held each year in March. The name of the festival come from the word Sorna, an ancient woodwind instrument common between Iranian folkloric music of many areas. It is the most important music event in the country with focus on Sorna.

Darrehshahr is also host to The National Biennial Photo Festival of Iranian Ethnic Groups, the first event of which was held in January 2012

Darrehshahr Archaeological Museum is the only archeological museum in western Iran. The museum is home to 300 artifacts, pottery, coins, Stucco and many more belonging to eras of Achaemenid, Sassanid, Safavid, Qajar, etc.

=== Tourism ===
Darrehshahr is known as the tourism center of Ilam province due to a wealth of nearby historical attraction and its rather warm climate in spring which brought as many as 244,000 tourists in spring of 2016.

Darrehshahr also hosts the only archaeological museum in the Ilam province. The Darrehshahr Museum is located on Imam Khomeini Blvd between the Darreh Shahr Ancient City entrance and the Darrehshahr Public Library. Most of the articles in the Darrehshahr Museum belong to Parthian Empire, Sasanian Empire, 1st millennium BCE and the Islamic era.

=== Historical attractions ===
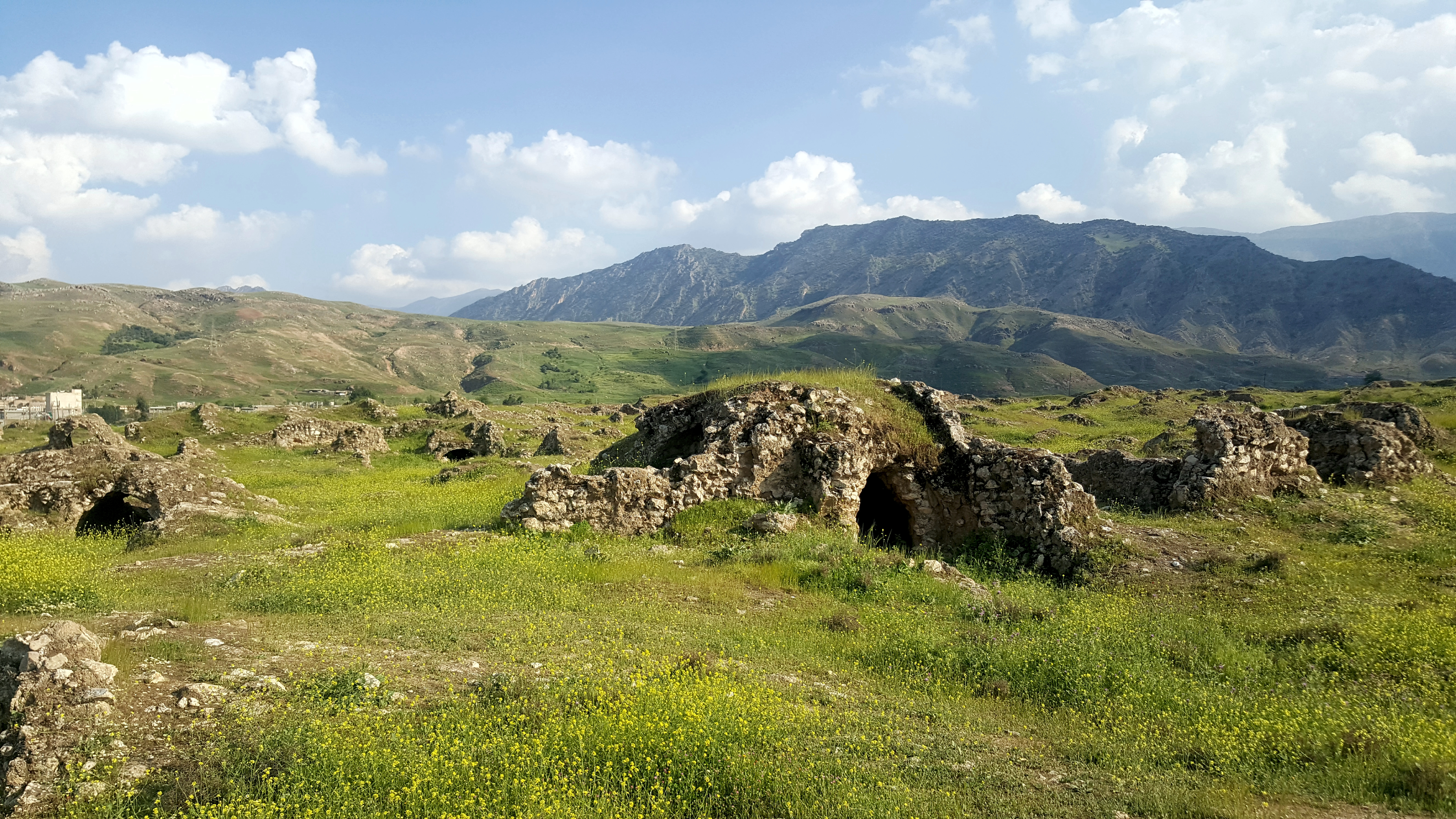
Madaktu also known as Darreh Shahr Ancient City.

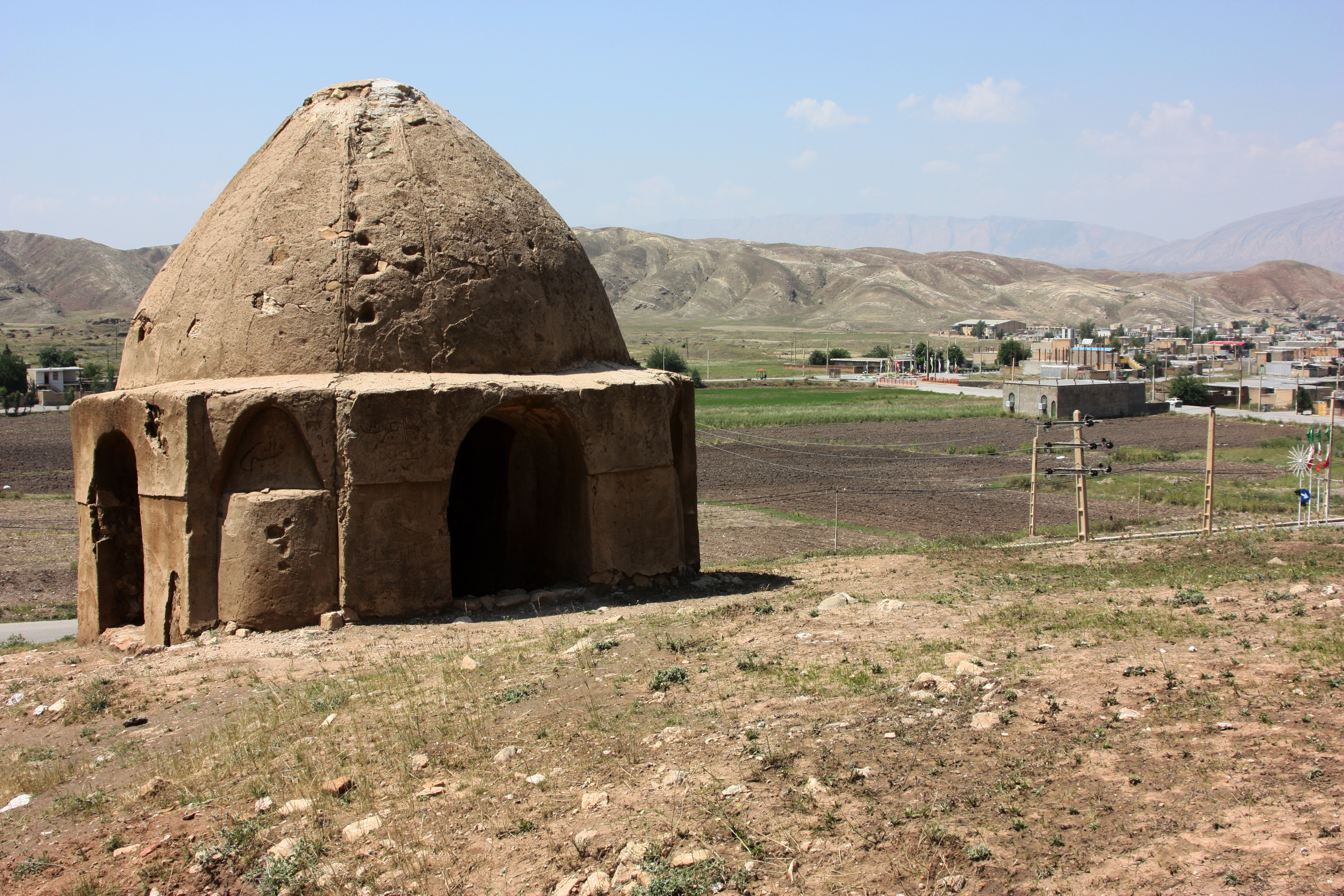
Darrehshahr Fire Temple is in Sorkh-Abad neighborhood.

The most prominent attractions in and around the city are:

Darreh Shahr Ancient City is located in south-eastern part of the present Darrehshahr. It is among the largest historical sites in Ilam province. It is about 200 acres and is one of the first places registered on National Historical Places of Iran. It belongs to Sassanids era. There are remains of buildings, walls, fortresses and bazaars in the area. Walls mostly consist of stone, concrete and plaster. based on the shape of buildings, materials and earthenware in and around the area, Darreh Shahr Ancient City belongs to late Sassanid era. It is believed that the city was destroyed on 334 AH (945–946) due to a catastrophic earthquake.

Darreh Shahr Fire Temple is a four-arched building which is locally called Taaq (Persian: تاق). The building was originally constructed by rubble stone and gypsum, and has recently been repaired.

Darrehshahr Public Library was founded in 1995 (1374 AP). It is home to more than 13,000 books and magazines. The library has about 1000 members.

== Infrastructure ==
=== Transportation ===
There are two major named surface routes in the city; the Nirooye Havaee boulevard which serves as the main arterial route into the city center running south-west connecting the Asad Abad, Ordoogah, Arazi Shahri and Sorkh Abad neighborhoods and merging into the Darrehshahr-Abdanan road; and, the Fahmideh-Seymareh boulevards which merge into roads running north-west to Ilam and south-east into Pol-e Dokhtar.

The Darrehshahr–Ilam route has been undergoing development projects but remains incomplete. Since the beginning of the project about 62 km (39 mi) have been upgraded into 2+1 highway with reversible lane. The state government has spent $21M so far and it still requires $35M more to finish the project.

The city has no inland navigable waterways. A disused small tarmac airstrip exists nearby which was used by agricultural aircraft. Nowadays it is mostly used by people who want to learn driving and farmers as a drying surface for their crops.

== Sport ==
Darrehshahr has offered many great athletes over time in a variety of sports such as the Martial arts, Wrestling, Volleyball, Football, Boxing and Athletics. In TKD, the most renowned figures are Seyed Ali Seydi and Jalal Yari with silver and bronze medals in national taekwondo competitions and many gold medals at provincial level. According to Ilam province Taekwondo Board, Seyed Ali Seyedi and Jalal Yari are the 1st and 3rd best trainers in the province.

Darrehshahr is home to three football schools: Perspolis, Shahin and Madakto. In May 2005, Darrehshahr's Persepolis U'14 Football team won the national league after defeating Zob Ahan SC U'14 team in Ahvaz Naft Stadium. Among the most successful football players are Jahangir Asgari who currently plays for Shahrdari Mahshahr C.S.C., Reza Ayyar, Reza Karami and Arian Darvishi.

Shahid Kulivand Stadium is the only football venue in the city and is currently under renovation.

In Wrestling, there have been national accomplishments. Amir Karami and Saeed Judaki, national silver and bronze medalists in Greco-Roman style and Hossein Karami, gold medalist in national junior wrestling championship.

In karate, Darrehshahr's Poorya-ye Vali Stadium hosted the first Western Provinces Karate Championship in November 2016.

== Education ==
Darrehshahr County Education Administration supervises all the schools in the county.

Universities:

- Islamic Azad University of Darrehshahr
- University of Applied Science and Technology of Darrehshahr
- Payame Noor University of Darrehshahr

High schools in the city are as follows:

- Shahid Motahari Public Boys'
- Bagher-al Olum Public Boys'
- Hazrat Zeinab Public Girls'
- Fatemieh Public Girls'
- Imam Khomeini Private Boys'
- Tohid Private Boys'
- Mobtakeran Private Boys'
- Shayesteghan Private Girls'

== See also ==
Media related to Darreh Shahr at Wikimedia Commons
