= Bahmanabad-e Olya =

Bahmanabad-e Olya بهمن آباد عليا
- Village
- Location within Iran
- Coordinates: 33°07′29″N 47°21′51″E
- Country: Iran
- Province: Ilam
- County: Darreh Shahr
- Bakhsh: Central
- Rural District: Zarrin Dasht

Population (2006)
  - Total: 248
- Time zone: UTC+3:30 (IRST)
  - Summer (DST): UTC+4:30 (IRDT)

Bahmanabad-e Olya (Persian: بهمن آباد عليا, also Romanized as Bahmanābād-e ‘Olyā; also known as Rashnowābād) is a village in Zarrin Dasht Rural District, in the Central District of Darreh Shahr County, Ilam Province, Iran. At the 2006 census, its population was 248, in 54 families. The village is populated by Kurds and Lurs.
