= Kolahjub-e Olya, Ilam =

Kolahjub-e Olya كله جوب عليا
- Village
- Location within Iran
- Coordinates: 33°07′38″N 47°24′49″E
- Country: Iran
- Province: Ilam
- County: Darreh Shahr
- Bakhsh: Central
- Rural District: Aramu

Population (2006)
  - Total: 788
- Time zone: UTC+3:30 (IRST)
  - Summer (DST): UTC+4:30 (IRDT)

Kolahjub-e Olya (Persian: كله جوب عليا, also Romanized as Kolahjūb-e ‘Olyā; also known as Kolah Jū and Kolahjūb) is a village in Aramu Rural District, in the Central District of Darreh Shahr County, Ilam Province, Iran. At the 2006 census, its population was 788, in 150 families. The village is populated by Kurds and Lurs.
