= Hamgam =

Neighborhood in Ilam province, Iran

Hamgam Persian: همگام
- Neighborhood
- Location within Iran Location within Ilam Province
- Coordinates: 32°57′19″N 47°47′40″E
- Country: Iran
- Province: Ilam
- County: Darreh Shahr
- District: Mazhin
- City: Mazhin

Population (2011)
  - Total: 19
- Time zone: UTC+3:30 (IRST)

Hamgam (Persian: همگام) (Note: Also romanized as Hamgām) is a neighborhood in the city of Mazhin in Mazhin District of Darreh Shahr County, Ilam province, Iran.

== Demographics ==
=== Ethnicity ===
The neighborhood is populated by Lurs.

=== Population ===
At the time of the 2006 National Census, Hamgam's population was 24 in 6 households, when it was a village in Mazhin Rural District. The following census in 2011 counted 19 people in 5 households.

After the census, the village of Mirza Hoseynabad merged with the villages of Fathabad, Hamgam, Heyderabad, and Irajabad to form the new city of Mazhin.
