= Abbasabad, Darreh Shahr =

Village in Ilam province, Iran

Abbasabad Persian: عباس اباد
- Village
- Location within Iran Location within Ilam Province
- Coordinates: 33°13′30″N 47°15′06″E
- Country: Iran
- Province: Ilam
- County: Darreh Shahr
- District: Central
- Rural District: Zarrindasht

Population (2016)
  - Total: 1,695
- Time zone: UTC+3:30 (IRST)

Abbasabad (Persian: عباس اباد) (Note: Also romanized as ‘Abbāsābād) is a village in Zarrindasht Rural District of the Central District of Darreh Shahr County, Ilam province, Iran.

== Demographics ==
=== Ethnicity ===
The village is populated by Kurds.

=== Population ===
At the time of the 2006 National Census, the village's population was 1,835 in 350 households. The following census in 2011 counted 1,774 people in 399 households. The 2016 census measured the population of the village as 1,695 people in 455 households. It was the most populous village in its rural district.
