= Godar-e Namak =

Village in Ilam province, Iran

Godar-e Namak Persian: گدارنمك
- Village
- Location within Iran Location within Ilam Province
- Coordinates: 32°59′27″N 47°44′25″E
- Country: Iran
- Province: Ilam
- County: Darreh Shahr
- District: Mazhin
- Rural District: Kulkani

Population (2016)
  - Total: 427
- Time zone: UTC+3:30 (IRST)

Godar-e Namak (Persian: گدارنمك) (Note: Also romanized as Godār-e Namaḵ) is a village in, and the capital of, Kulkani Rural District of Mazhin District, Darreh Shahr County, Ilam province, Iran.

== Demographics ==
=== Ethnicity ===
The village is populated by Lurs.

=== Population ===
At the time of the 2006 National Census, the village's population was 571 in 94 households. The following census in 2011 counted 543 people in 127 households. The 2016 census measured the population of the village as 427 people in 115 households. It was the most populous village in its rural district.
