= Sikun =

Sikun may refer to:

- Sikun, Iran, a village in Ilam Province, Iran
- Sikun (Dune), a fictional planet in the Dune universe created by Frank Herbert
