= Gavmishan Bridge =

Bridge in Iran

Gavmishan Bridge پل گاومیشان
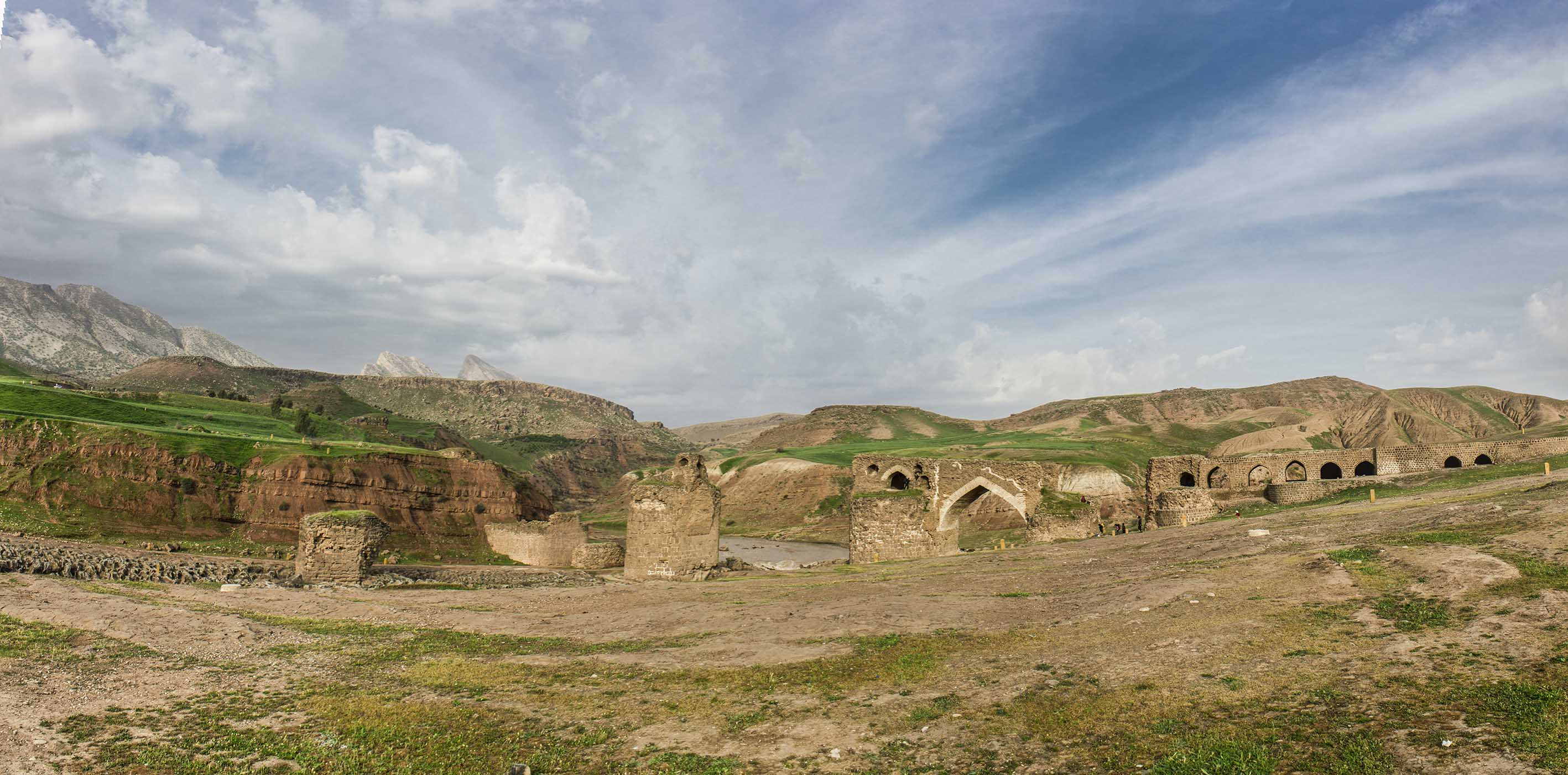
- The bridge in 2015
- Coordinates: 33°05′02″N 47°32′15″E
- Crossed: Seymareh River
- Locale: Border of Ilam and Lorestan Provinces
- Maintained by: ICHTO
- Heritage status: Iran National Heritage List
- Registry Number: 2222

Characteristics
- Design: Arch
- Material: Mortar, Brick and Rock
- Total length: 175 m (574 ft)
- Width: 8.2 m (27 ft)
- Traversable?: No
- Longest span: 33.7 m (111 ft)
- No. of spans: 6
- Piers in water: 2
- Design life: Around 1400 years

History
- Construction end: Late Sasanian Era
- Collapsed: During Muslim Conquest of Persia

Location
- Interactive map of Gavmishan Bridge

Gavmishan Bridge is a historic bridge in Darreh Shahr County, Ilam Province, Iran. The bridge was built in the late Sasanian era on Karkheh River, parts of which constitute the modern-day border of Ilam and Lorestan provinces. It is 175 m (574 ft) in length and about 8 m (26 ft) in width. It has the longest arch span among the ancient bridges in Iran and the world. Many experts consider it an engineering feat, considering the time when it was built, the material used and the floods it has withstood during its age of 1,400 years.

It is believed that the bridge was intentionally destroyed by the Persian army to stop or slow down the invasion of Arabs during the Muslim Conquest of Persia in the 7th century.

== Location ==
The bridge passes Karkheh river, which is the confluence of Seymareh and Kashkan rivers. Nowadays, Seymareh and Karkheh indicate the eastern border of Ilam Province.

It is 20 km east of Darreh Shahr, and 30 km from Pol-e Dokhtar, near the modern bridge.

== Restoration ==
According to texts, the bridge was once restored by Vaali of Posht-Kooh about 200 years ago.

Being on the border of Ilam and Lorestan provinces has resulted in many disputes regarding ownership of the bridge. Nevertheless, the latest restoration took place between 2005 and 2008 with funding from Ilam province.
