= Aramu, Iran =

Aramu or Armu (Persian: ارمو) may refer to:

- Aramu, Ilam
- Armu, Mazandaran
- Aramu Rural District, in Ilam Province
