= Armu =

Armu may refer to:

- Armu, Iran (disambiguation), various places
- Armu River, in Russia
