= Mir Ghulam Hashemi Castle =

Castle in Ilam Province, Iran

Mir Ghulam Hashemi castle
- قلعه میرغلام هاشمی
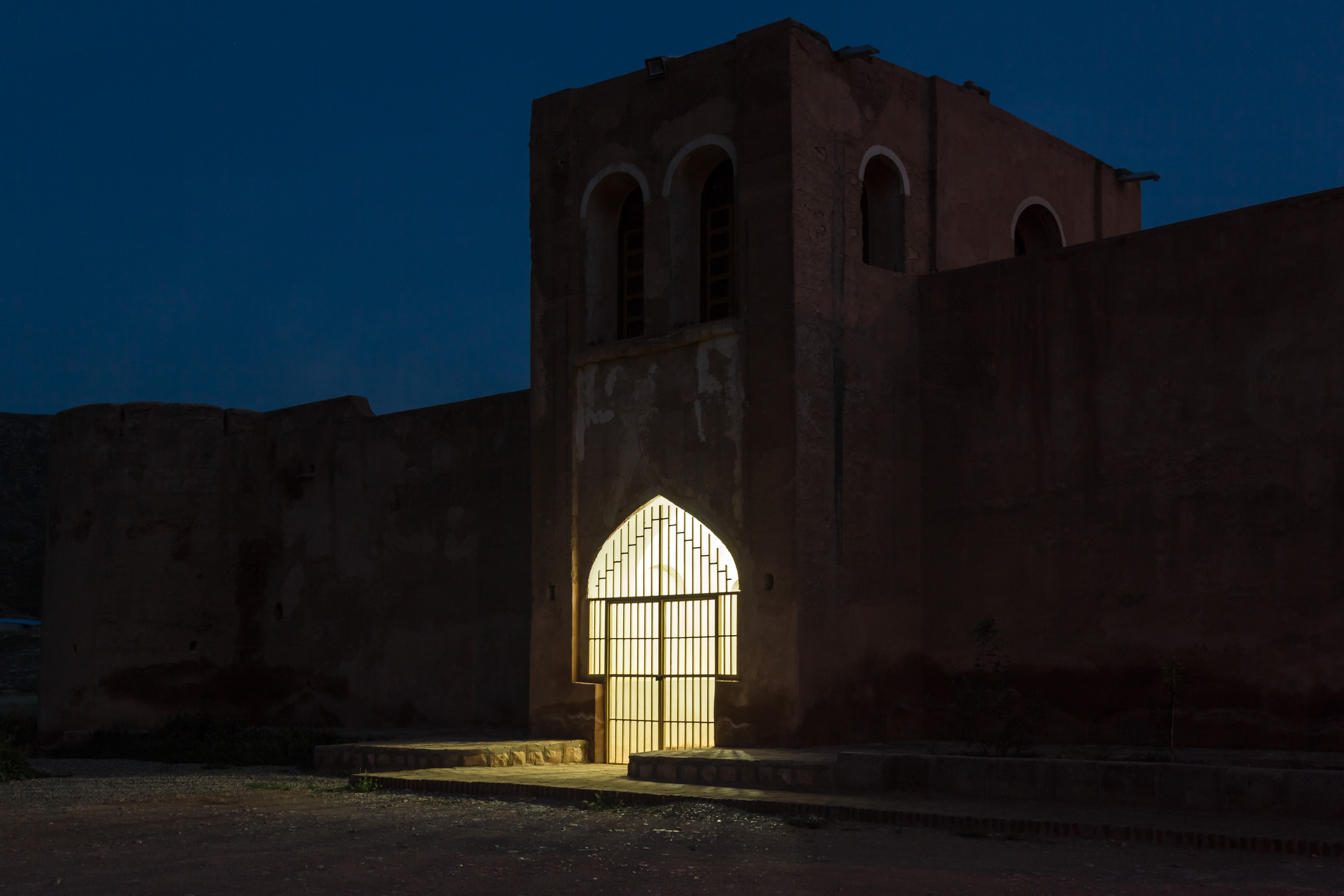
- Interactive map of the Mir Ghulam Hashemi castle area
- Former names: قلعه سیکان

General information
- Type: Castle
- Location: Hashemi Abad, هاشم اباد, Darreh Shahr County, Iran

Mir Ghulam Hashemi castle (Persian: قلعه میرغلام هاشمی) is a historical castle located in Darreh Shahr County in Ilam Province, The longevity of this fortress dates back to the Pahlavi dynasty. It was continuously lived in until 1975. The last family who lived here were the Eskandari family. Jahangeer Eskandari was half brother of Agha Sultan Hashemi. She was hier to Mir Gholam. She died in 2007.
