= Sheikh Makan Fort =

Historical site in Iran

- قلعه شیخ مکان (Persian)
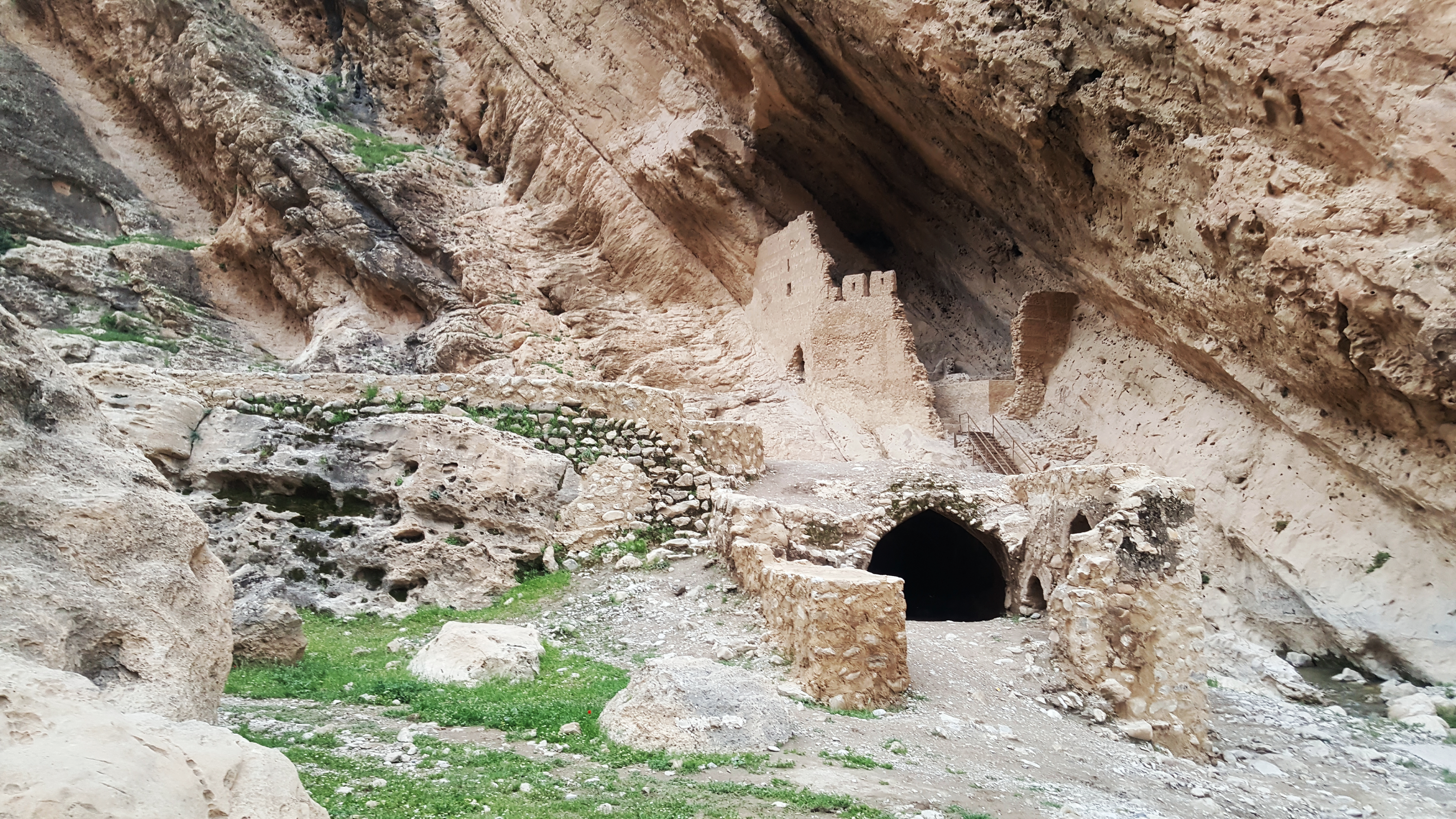
- Sheikh Makan Fort

- Location within Ilam Province
- 33°05′50″N 47°24′00″E
- Type: fortification
- Location: Darreh Shahr County, Ilam Province, Iran

Site notes
- Elevation: 670 m (2,200 ft)

Sheikh Makan Fort is a historical site in Sheykh Makan village in Darreh Shahr County, Ilam Province, Iran. The fort was constructed in the time of the Sasanian Empire. The fort became a registered Iran National Site on 8 March 2003.
