= Pur Ashraf Sheykh Makan Castle =

Castle in Ilam Province, Iran

Pourashraf Castle
- قلعه پور اشرف

General information
- Type: Castle
- Location: Darreh Shahr County, Iran

Pourashraf Castle (Persian: قلعه پور اشرف) is a historical castle located in Darreh Shahr County in Ilam Province, The longevity of this fortress dates back to the 1335 AH.
