= Aramu, Ilam =

Village in Ilam province, Iran

Aramu Persian: ارمو
- Village
- Location within Iran Location within Ilam Province
- Coordinates: 33°06′36″N 47°28′27″E
- Country: Iran
- Province: Ilam
- County: Darreh Shahr
- District: Central
- Rural District: Aramu

Population (2016)
  - Total: 2,383
- Time zone: UTC+3:30 (IRST)

Aramu (Persian: ارمو) (Note: Also romanized as Āramū and Armū) is a village in, and the capital of, Aramu Rural District of the Central District of Darreh Shahr County, Ilam province, Iran.

== Demographics ==
=== Ethnicity ===
The village is populated by Lurs.

=== Population ===
At the time of the 2006 National Census, the village's population was 2,408 in 501 households. The following census in 2011 counted 2,516 people in 619 households. The 2016 census measured the population of the village as 2,383 people in 665 households. It was the most populous village in its rural district.
