= Mazhin, Iran =

City in Ilam province, Iran

Mazhin Persian: ماژين
- City
- Location within Iran Location within Ilam Province
- Coordinates: 32°57′16″N 47°47′21″E
- Country: Iran
- Province: Ilam
- County: Darreh Shahr
- District: Mazhin

Population (2016)
  - Total: 1,512
- Time zone: UTC+3:30 (IRST)

Mazhin (Persian: ماژين) (Note: Also romanized as Māzhīn; also known as Mirza Hoseynabad (ميرزاحسين اباد), also romanized as Mīrzā Ḩoseynābād; also known as Magin, Majin, Mazhīr, and Mīrzā Ḩoseynābād-e Māzhīn) is a city in, and the capital of, Mazhin District of Darreh Shahr County, Ilam province, Iran. As a village, it was the capital of Mazhin Rural District until its capital was transferred to the village of Meydan Khalaf.

== Demographics ==
=== Ethnicity ===
The city is populated by Lurs.

=== Population ===
At the time of the 2006 National Census, the population was 973 in 200 households, when it was a village in Mazhin Rural District. The following census in 2011 counted 1,160 people in 294 households. The 2016 census measured the population as 1,512 people in 422 households, by which time the village of Mirza Hoseynabad had merged with the villages of Fathabad, Hamgam, Heyderabad, and Irajabad to form the new city of Mazhin.
