= Seimare Dam =

Dam in Ilam, Iran

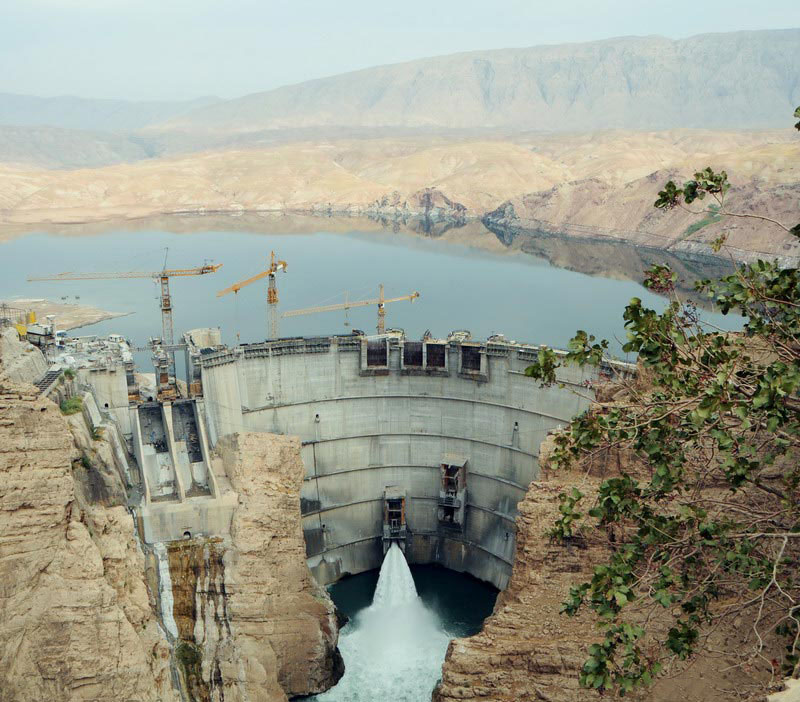

- Location within Iran
- Interactive map of Seimare Dam
- Country: Iran
- Location: Badreh County
- Coordinates: 33°17′28″N 47°11′55″E
- Status: Operational
- Construction began: 1997
- Opening date: 2013

Dam and spillways
- Type of dam: Arch dam
- Impounds: Seimare River
- Height: 180 m (591 ft)
- Length: 202 m (663 ft)
- Width (crest): 6 m (20 ft)
- Width (base): 28 m (92 ft)
- Dam volume: 550,000 m^{3} (719,373 cu yd)
- Spillways: 2
- Spillway type: Main, auxiliary
- Spillway capacity: 8,230 m^{3}/s (290,640 cu ft/s) (total)

Reservoir
- Creates: Seimareh Reservoir
- Total capacity: 3,200,000,000 m^{3} (2,594,282 acre⋅ft)
- Catchment area: 27,886 km^{2} (10,767 sq mi)
- Surface area: 69.5 km^{2} (27 sq mi)
- Maximum length: 40 km (25 mi)
- Normal elevation: 720 m (2,362 ft)

Power Station
- Coordinates: 33°16′46.12″N 47°12′36.01″E
- Commission date: 2013
- Turbines: 3 x 160 MW Francis-type
- Installed capacity: 480 MW
- Annual generation: 850 million kWh (est.)

Seimare Dam (Persian: سد سیمره), also known as Hini Mini or spelled Seymareh, is an arch dam on the Seimare River in Badreh County, Ilam Province, Iran. The primary purpose of the dam is hydroelectric power generation. Studies for the dam were carried out in the mid to late 1970s and construction began on the diversion works in 1997. In 2006, concrete placement began and on 19 May 2011, the dam began to impound the river. The dam's first generator became operational in 2013. The power plant, located downstream, houses three 160 MW Francis turbine-generators with an installed capacity of 480 MW.

The dam is a 180 m (591 ft) tall variable-radius arch type with a crest length of 202 m (663 ft). The dam's crest is 6 m (20 ft) wide with a base width of 28 m (92 ft) while the volume of concrete in the dam structure is 550,000 m^{3} (719,373 cu yd). The dam sits at the head of a 27,886 km^{2} (10,767 sq mi) catchment area and creates a reservoir with a 3,200,000,000 m^{3} (2,594,282 acre⋅ft) capacity. The reservoir's surface area is 69.5 km^{2} (27 sq mi) and its length 40 km (25 mi). The dam has a main and auxiliary spillway. The main spillway is controlled by two radial gates and has a maximum discharge capacity of 5,763 m^{3}/s (203,518 cu ft/s). The auxiliary spillway is uncontrolled and has a discharge capacity of 2,467 m^{3}/s (87,121 cu ft/s).

== See also ==
- List of power stations in Iran
- Dams in Iran
