= Darreh Shahr Ancient City =

Ancient site in Iran

- شهر باستانی دره‌شهر (Persian)
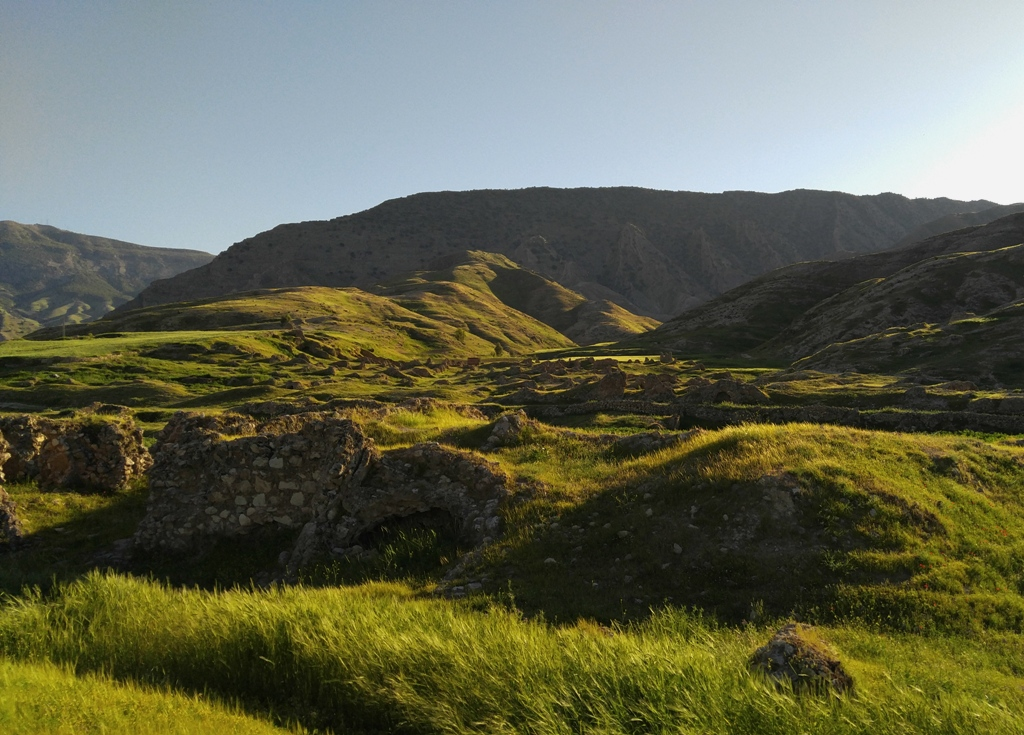
- The site in the spring.
- Interactive map of Darreh Shahr Ancient City
- 33°07′45″N 47°22′02″E
- Location: Darreh Shahr

Site notes
- Elevation: 690m

Iran National Heritage List
- Official name: Darreh Shahr Ancient City
- Type: Ruins
- Designated: 1931
- Reference no.: 6
- Conservation organization: Cultural Heritage, Handicrafts and Tourism Organization of Iran

Darreh Shahr Ancient City, also known as Madaktu and Seymareh, is the name of a 200 hectares (490 acres) ruined area next to the existing city of Darreh Shahr in southwest Iran, in Ilam Province. The ruins belong to an ancient city of the late Sasanian era (224 – 651 AD) and is believed to be built on remnants of the Elamite capital, Madaktu. Historic texts and also recent findings reveal the fact that the city included about 5,000 houses with some modern aspects such as a water distribution system through clay pipes and underground sewers. The city was destroyed and deserted after a huge earthquake around 950 AD.

== Ancient history ==
In ancient times, Elamites governed the Lorestan mountains and constructed several strong buildings. Darreh-Shahr was the first Elamite city attacked and destroyed by Assyrians, with its people massacred. In Seymareh Valley, the remains of Sasanian monuments are still present, hence Dareh-Shahr might have been a thriving city in the Sasanian and the preceding Parthian eras. Furthermore, foreign experts call the unearthed city as the second and lost capital of the Seleucids, while some Iranian archeologists believe the monuments are part of the state of Shirvan.

Some resources and texts link Dareh-Shahr to Mehr Jaan Ghazagh, Saabzaan, Seymareh, or the city of Khosrow Parviz in the late Sasanian era, which was completely flattened by earthquakes in 248 and 344 AH (circa 862 and 955 AD respectively).

In the ruins of Dareh-Shahr, which belong to the Sasanian era, there are the vestiges of crosses, arches, ceilings, dome-shaped ceilings, alleys, and passages with urban development characteristics of that time.

All the buildings of Dareh-Shahr are built from abraded stones and gypsum. The abundance of gypsum in Seymareh Valley and the simplicity of working with it led to their use in the Sassanid architecture.

Coins discovered in this area belong to the rule of Khosrow III and his successors. Located in the south of Dareh-Shahr, at the beginning of a gorge of the same name on the outskirts of Kabir Kuh, is an ancient bridge called Gavmishan with 3 arches that were repaired in 2008. Each of its arches is at an interval of 5.5 metres (18 ft).

== Discoveries ==
Archeological excavations of the 1990s in Dareh-Shahr revealed a significant number of stucco surfaces and pieces which, in terms of diversity, finesse and aesthetics, are unique and unparalleled.

The stucco patterns in this region are diverse and bear detailed decorations. The shapes are geometric with plant motifs. The stucco works are in geometrical shapes (triangular, round, square and rectangular) and the surfaces are solid. All the pieces have backgrounds and margins. The marginal shapes are in the form of Greek chains, rope-like texture and consecutive sevens, upside-down patterns and consecutive ‘S’ shapes.

Patterns in the center include lilies and 6- or 8-leaf flowers with a central circle, pomegranate, palm leaf and clusters combined in a composition. This image reveals the imaginative power of artists who, given the quality and flexibility of stucco, were able to create them because of the lack of stucco firmness.

In 2000, 50-day operations were launched by a team of archeologists. Excavations were aimed at shedding light on the unknown features and historical background of the ancient area.

Unearthed remains of a city structure, including residential quarters, passages, stables, market place, public bath and modern sewage system, have attracted the attention of Iranian and foreign archeologists in recent years.

In 2006, eleven rare objects dating back to 2800 BC were illegally unearthed from Dareh-Shahr. These included metal items such as arrows with designs, metals depicting wild goats, a golden cup and a unique and precious silver mask, which is estimated to be from the first millennium BC. Fortunately, this collection was seized in Tehran from an illegal digger in April of that year and was transferred to the Cultural Heritage Police Department. In 2007, the continuation of agricultural activities in the vicinity of the national heritage site of Dareh-Shahr threatened this historical city.

== Heritage listing ==
According to Behzad Faryadian, the head of Seymareh Cultural Heritage Department, Dareh-Shahr was registered as the tenth cultural heritage site on the National Heritage List in 1932.

However, the area of this national heritage site has reduced from 200 to 60 hectares (490 to 150 acres) due to farming activities in the region. So far, agricultural activities have damaged a large amount of historical evidence and resulted in the destruction of a large number of historical buildings. Currently, farmers who have occupied the lands do not have title deeds. Also, since there was no supervision over these lands in the past few decades, a large area of this territory have been occupied and cultivated by local farmers.
