= Sheykh Makan =

Village in Ilam, Iran

Sheykh Makan شيخ مكان
- Village
- Location within Iran
- Coordinates: 33°06′00″N 47°24′13″E
- Country: Iran
- Province: Ilam
- County: Darreh Shahr
- Bakhsh: Central
- Rural District: Aramu

Population (2006)
  - Total: 800
- Time zone: UTC+3:30 (IRST)
  - Summer (DST): UTC+4:30 (IRDT)

Sheykh Makan (Persian: شيخ مكان, also Romanized as Sheykh Makān; also known as Qal‘eh-ye Sheykh Mākhūn, Shaikh Mākūn, and Sheykh Mākhūn) is a village in Aramu Rural District, in the Central District of Darreh Shahr County, Ilam Province, Iran. At the 2006 census, its population was 800, in 154 families. The village is populated by Kurds.
