= Bahonar =

Bahonar (Persian: باهنر) may refer to:

- Mohammad Javad Bahonar, Prime Minister of Iran assassinated in 1981
- Mohammad Reza Bahonar, Deputy Speaker of Majlis of Iran, brother of Mohammad Javad Bahonar
- Bahonar, an Iranian placename

== See also ==
- Shahid Bahonar (disambiguation)
