= Choaspes River (Afghanistan) =

River in Afghanistan

The Choaspes (Ancient Greek: Χωάσπης) (also called Zuastus and Guræus) is a river that rises in the ancient Paropamise range (now the Hindu Kush in Afghanistan), eventually falling into the Indus river near its confluence with the Cophes river (which is usually identified with the Kabul river). Strabo's Geography, Book XV, Chapter 1, § 26 incorrectly states that the Choaspes empties directly into the Cophes. The river should not be confused with the river of the same name which flows into the Tigris (after Smith 1854).
