= Talebabad, Khuzestan =

Talebabad طالب اباد
- Village
- Location within Iran
- Coordinates: 32°09′01″N 48°18′05″E
- Country: Iran
- Province: Khuzestan
- County: Shush
- Bakhsh: Central
- Rural District: Hoseynabad

Population (2006)
  - Total: 182
- Time zone: UTC+3:30 (IRST)
  - Summer (DST): UTC+4:30 (IRDT)

Talebabad (Persian: طالب اباد, also Romanized as Ţālebābād; also known as Shahīd Bāhonar) is a village in Hoseynabad Rural District, in the Central District of Shush County, Khuzestan Province, Iran. At the 2006 census, its population was 182, in 28 families.
