= Shahrak-e Shahid Bahonar =

Shahrak-e Shahid Bahonar شهرك شهيدباهنر
- Village
- Location within Iran
- Coordinates: 31°09′03″N 49°37′17″E
- Country: Iran
- Province: Khuzestan
- County: Ramhormoz
- Bakhsh: Central
- Rural District: Howmeh-ye Sharqi

Population (2006)
  - Total: 94
- Time zone: UTC+3:30 (IRST)
  - Summer (DST): UTC+4:30 (IRDT)

Shahrak-e Shahid Bahonar (Persian: شهرك شهيدباهنر, also Romanized as Shahrak-e Shahīd Bāhonar; also known as Shahīd Bāhonar) is a village in Howmeh-ye Sharqi Rural District, in the Central District of Ramhormoz County, Khuzestan Province, Iran. At the 2006 census, its population was 94, in 21 families.
