= Nasrollahabad, Khuzestan =

Nasrollahabad نصراله اباد
- Village
- Location within Iran
- Coordinates: 32°28′28″N 49°11′16″E
- Country: Iran
- Province: Khuzestan
- County: Lali
- Bakhsh: Central
- Rural District: Sadat

Population (2006)
  - Total: 80
- Time zone: UTC+3:30 (IRST)
  - Summer (DST): UTC+4:30 (IRDT)

Nasrollahabad (Persian: نصراله اباد, also Romanized as Naşrollāhābād) is a village in Sadat Rural District, in the Central District of Lali County, Khuzestan Province, Iran. At the 2006 census, its population was 80, in 22 families.
