= Kolah Jub-e Olya, Kermanshah =

Kolah Jub-e Olya كله جوب عليا
- Village
- Location within Iran
- Coordinates: 34°38′06″N 47°26′28″E
- Country: Iran
- Province: Kermanshah
- County: Sahneh
- Bakhsh: Dinavar
- Rural District: Dinavar

Population (2006)
  - Total: 100
- Time zone: UTC+3:30 (IRST)
  - Summer (DST): UTC+4:30 (IRDT)

Kolah Jub-e Olya (Persian: كله جوب عليا, also Romanized as Kolah Jūb-e ‘Olyā; also known as Kolah Jūb) is a village in Dinavar Rural District, Dinavar District, Sahneh County, Kermanshah Province, Iran. At the 2006 census, its population was 100, in 30 families.
