= Kulkani Rural District =

Rural district in Ilam province, Iran

Kulkani Rural District Persian: دهستان كولكني
- Rural District
- Location within Iran Location within Ilam Province
- Coordinates: 32°59′13″N 47°35′57″E
- Country: Iran
- Province: Ilam
- County: Darreh Shahr
- District: Mazhin
- Capital: Godar-e Namak

Population (2016)
  - Total: 1,384
- Time zone: UTC+3:30 (IRST)

Kulkani Rural District (Persian: دهستان كولكني) is in Mazhin District of Darreh Shahr County, Ilam province, Iran. Its capital is the village of Godar-e Namak.

== Demographics ==
=== Population ===
At the time of the 2006 National Census, the rural district's population was 1,719 in 310 households. There were 1,610 inhabitants in 382 households at the following census of 2011. The 2016 census measured the population of the rural district as 1,384 in 368 households. The most populous of its eight villages was Godar-e Namak, with 427 people.
