= Kabir Kouh =

Kabir Kuh
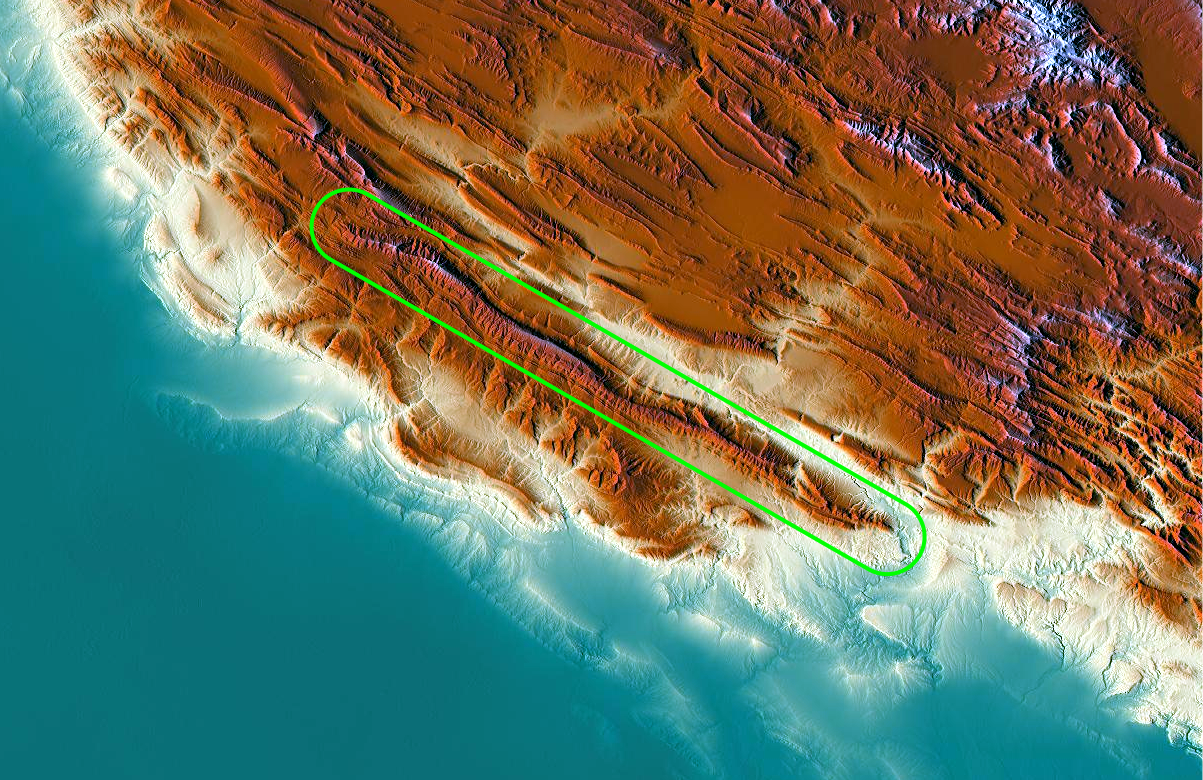
- Relief of the Kabir Kuh range (outlined in green)

Highest point
- Elevation: 2,790 m (9,150 ft)
- Coordinates: 33°13′16″N 47°06′18″E

Naming
- Native name: کبیرکوه (Persian)
- English translation: The Great Mountain

Geography
- Location: Ilam province

Geology
- Mountain type: Mountain range

Kabir Kuh (Persian: کبیرکوه; Kurdish: کڤەر -Kiver) is one of the long ranges of the Zagros Mountains near the border of Lurestan and Ilam provinces in Ilam province, Iran. Covering an area of 9,500 km^{2} (3,700 sq mi), Kabir Kuh stretches 175 km (109 mi) in length and 48–80 km (30–50 mi) in width along the Zagros Mountains in the northwest–southeast direction. It begins about 20 km (12 mi) south of Ilam and stretches down to the vicinity of Andimeshk in Khuzestan. Made mainly by Cretaceous sedimentary rocks, the Kabir Kuh range consists of a large number of mountains, including Shah Ahmad, Tabriz, Kaleh-bad, Filman, Damaghey-e Anar, Rivasan, Puneh, Sabzkhani, Zarrin, Golgol that are covered by snow and ice all year round. Its highest peak is Kan Seifi with 2,790 m (9,150 ft) elevation, 50 km (31 mi) south-east of Ilam. Kabir Kuh runs along the Seymareh River, which becomes Karkheh when joins the Kashkan river before reaching the border of Ilam province and Khuzestan province. Kabir Kuh divides the mountainous region in western Iran into two regions generally referred as Piškuh (eastern side) and Poštkuh (western side), the latter virtually coinciding with Ilam. In prehistoric times, one of the largest known landslides occurred on the north-eastern slope of Kabir Kouh, moving across the Seymareh River.

The eastern side is dominated by steep slopes where water and wooded valleys abound. The western side is, however, quite dry but rich in oil reservoirs and underground resources.

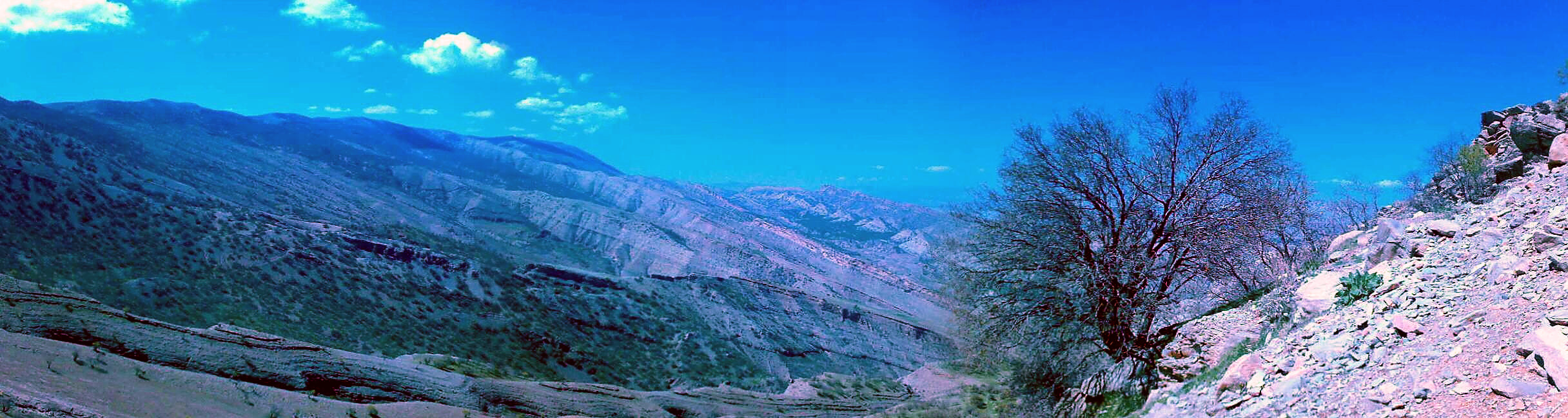
Kabir Kuh ranges near Darreh Shahr
