= Zarrindasht Rural District =

Rural district in Ilam province, Iran

Zarrindasht Rural District Persian: دهستان زرین‌دشت
- Rural District
- Location within Iran Location within Ilam Province
- Coordinates: 33°09′28″N 47°19′02″E
- Country: Iran
- Province: Ilam
- County: Darreh Shahr
- District: Central
- Capital: Dashtabad-e Olya

Population (2016)
  - Total: 9,652
- Time zone: UTC+3:30 (IRST)

Zarrindasht Rural District (Persian: دهستان زرین‌دشت) is in the Central District of Darreh Shahr County, Ilam province, Iran. Its capital is the village of Dashtabad-e Olya.

== Demographics ==
=== Population ===
At the time of the 2006 National Census, the rural district's population was 9,680 in 1,926 households. There were 9,987 inhabitants in 2,535 households at the following census of 2011. The 2016 census measured the population of the rural district as 9,652 in 2,714 households. The most populous of its 36 villages was Abbasabad, with 1,695 people.
