= Seymareh River =

River in Iran

Coordinates: 33°06′06″N 47°31′32″E

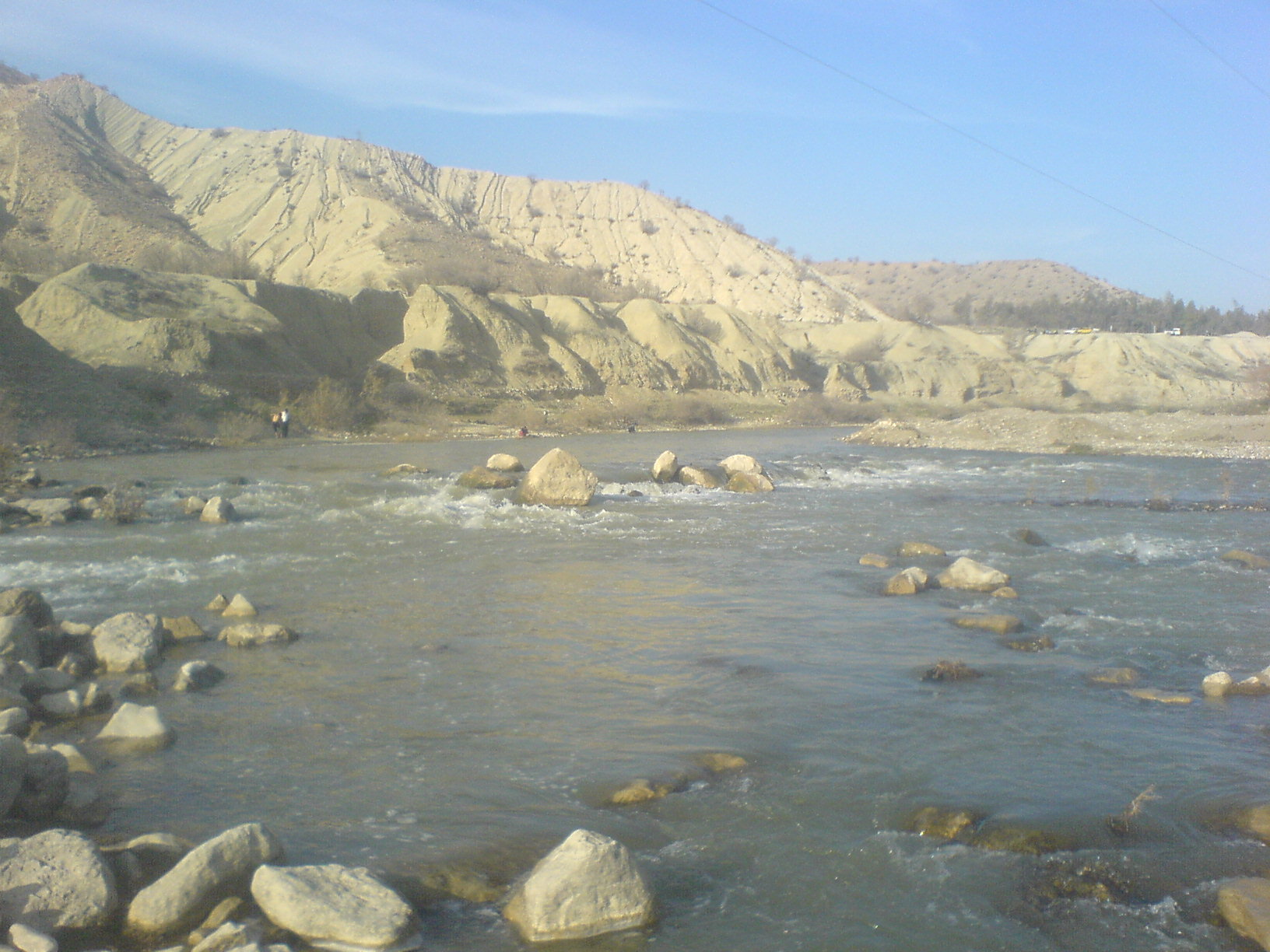
- Seymareh near the Seymareh Bridge
- Native name: رود سیمره (Persian)

Location
- Country: Iran
- Provinces: Kermanshah, Lorestan, Ilam
- Counties: Kermanshah,

Physical characteristics
- Source: Confluence of Gharehsoo and Ghamasiab rivers.
- Length: 417 km (259 mi)
- Basin size: 51,912 km^{2} (20,043 sq mi)
- Discharge
  - average: 87.5 m^{3}/s (3,090 cu ft/s)

Basin features
- River system: Karkheh Watershed
- Waterbodies: Seymareh Dam

The Seymareh (Persian: سیمره) is a river in southwestern Iran formed by the confluence of the Gharehsoo and Ghamasiab rivers in an area around southwest Kermanshah. Seymareh converges with Kashkan just before the historical Gavmishan Bridge near Darreh Shahr to create Karkheh River, an important river in Iran. The change of names from Seymareh to Karkheh is sometimes also considered further downstream (at the mouth of Zal river at the border of the Khuzestan province).

The Seymareh Dam, a 480MW hydroelectric power station is located on the lower course of Seymareh near Cheshmeh Shirin, Darreh Shahr.
