= Karkheh River =

River in Iran

Coordinates: 33°05′46″N 47°31′34″E

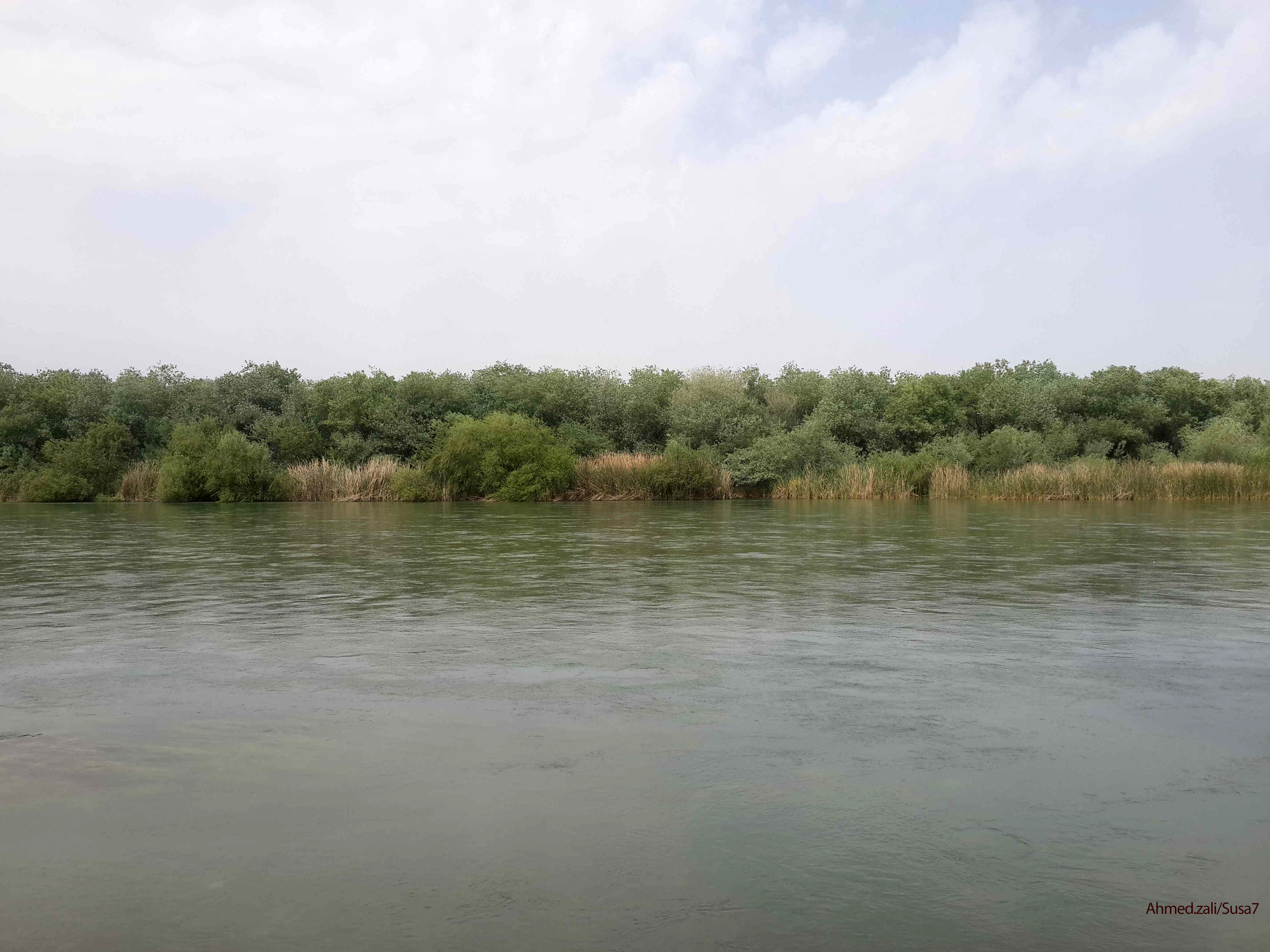

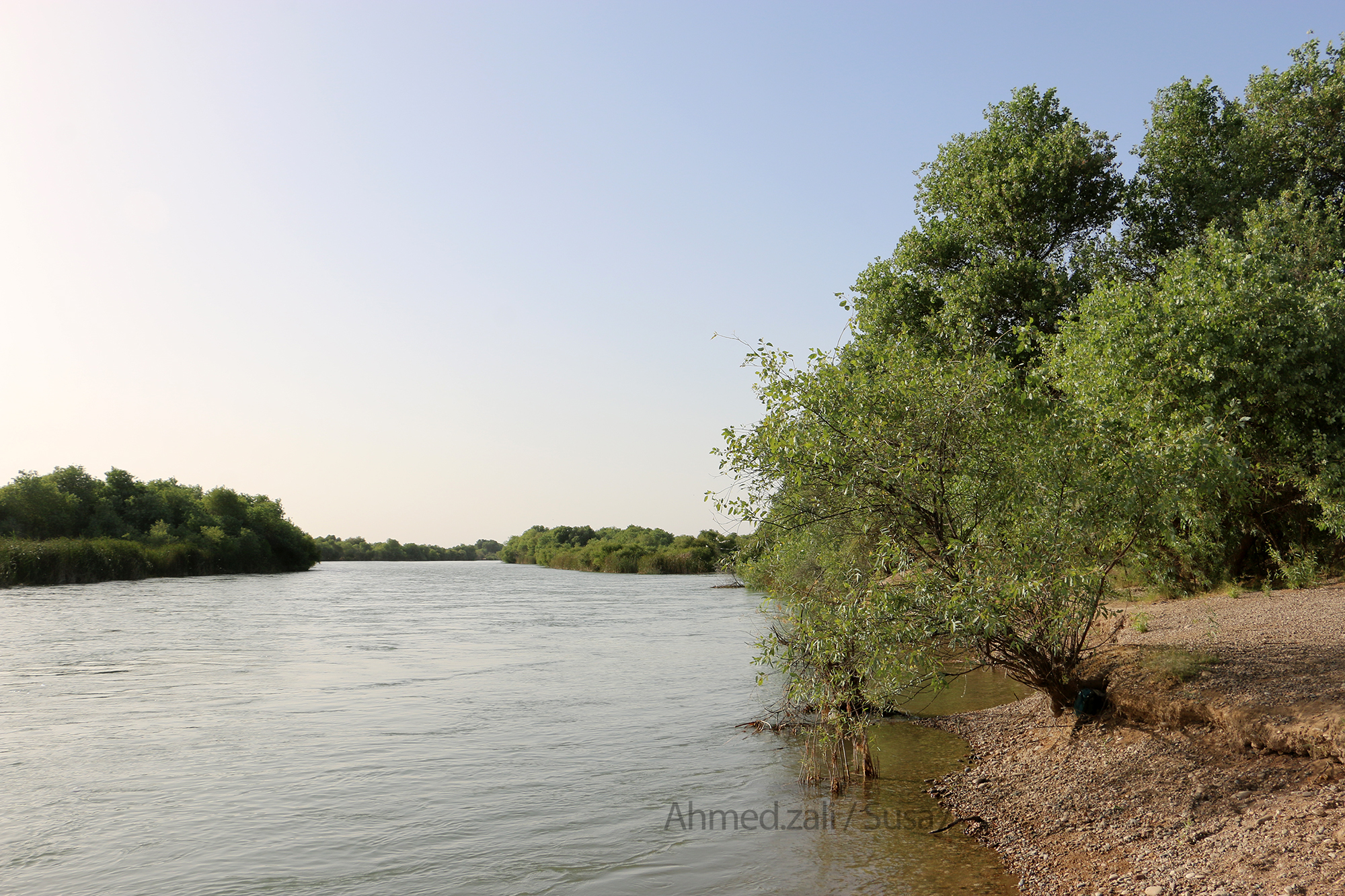

The Karkheh or Karkhen (Persian: کرخه) (known as Choaspes Ancient Greek: Χοάσπης in ancient times; also called Eulæus, in Ancient Greek: Εὔλαιος or Εὐλαῖος; Hebrew: אולי Ulai) is a river in Khūzestān Province, in southwest Iran (ancient Susiana).

== Description ==
The river rises in the Zagros Mountains, and passes west of Shush (ancient Susa), eventually falling in ancient times into the Tigris just below its confluence with the Euphrates very near to the Iran-Iraq border. In modern times, after approaching within 16 kilometres (10 mi) of the Dez River, it turns to the southwest and then, northwest of Ahvaz, turns northwest and is absorbed by the Hawizeh Marshes that straddle the Iran–Iraq border. Its peculiarly sweet water was sacred to the use of the Persian kings. Ancient names for the Karkheh should be treated as conjectural because the bed of the river has changed in historic times, and because a nearby watercourse between the Karkheh and the Dez River, the Shaur, confuses the identification.

The problem with the ancient names is that while the Karkheh flows a kilometre or two west of Susa, another major watercourse flows parallel to the Karkheh within a few kilometres east of Susa. When these rivers are in flood stage, the entire area south of Susa can be flooded, as the waters of the two watercourses mingle. The watercourse a kilometre or two east of Susa, now called the Shaur, flows east between the Haft Tepe and Shaur ridges into the Dez River, north of where the Dez and Karun rivers merge. At some previous time, the Karkheh may have joined the eastern end of the Shaur. The timing of these changes is not known with any certainty. The ancient name of the Shaur may have been the Choaspes.

The river is mentioned in the Bible, Book of Daniel 8:2,16, and should not be confused with the Choaspes River in modern-day Afghanistan, which flows into the Indus.

In 2007, the endangered Persian fallow deer was successfully reintroduced to its historical habitat along the Karkheh River in the Dez and Karkheh protected areas, marking a key step in its conservation.

The river is currently the location of the Karkheh Dam and hydro-power plant in Iran.

== See also ==
- Az Karkheh ta Rhein
