= Aramu Rural District =

Rural district in Ilam province, Iran

Aramu Rural District Persian: دهستان ارمو
- Rural District
- Location within Iran Location within Ilam Province
- Coordinates: 33°06′36″N 47°28′14″E
- Country: Iran
- Province: Ilam
- County: Darreh Shahr
- District: Central
- Capital: Aramu

Population (2016)
  - Total: 8,010
- Time zone: UTC+3:30 (IRST)

Aramu Rural District (Persian: دهستان ارمو) is in the Central District of Darreh Shahr County, Ilam province, Iran. Its capital is the village of Aramu.

== Demographics ==
=== Population ===
At the time of the 2006 National Census, the rural district's population was 7,089 in 1,399 households. There were 8,017 inhabitants in 1,998 households at the following census of 2011. The 2016 census measured the population of the rural district as 8,010 in 2,172 households. The most populous of its 24 villages was Aramu, with 2,383 people.
