= Mazhin District =

District in Ilam province, Iran

Mazhin District Persian: بخش ماژین
- District
- Location within Iran Location within Ilam Province
- Coordinates: 32°58′00″N 47°42′30″E
- Country: Iran
- Province: Ilam
- County: Darreh Shahr
- Capital: Mazhin

Population (2016)
  - Total: 4,146
- Time zone: UTC+3:30 (IRST)

Mazhin District (Persian: بخش ماژین) is in Darreh Shahr County, Ilam province, Iran. Its capital is the city of Mazhin.

== History ==
After the 2011 National Census, the village of Mirza Hoseynabad merged with four other villages to form the new city of Mazhin.

== Demographics ==
=== Population ===
At the time of the 2006 census, the district's population was 4,885 in 929 households. The following census in 2011 counted 4,437 people in 1,062 households. The 2016 census measured the population of the district as 4,146 inhabitants in 1,138 households.

=== Administrative divisions ===
Mazhin District Population
Administrative Divisions	2006	2011	2016
Kulkani RD	1,719	1,610	1,384
Mazhin RD	3,166	2,827	1,250
Mazhin (city) (Note: Merger of several villages)			1,512
Total	4,885	4,437	4,146
RD = Rural District
