= Central District (Darreh Shahr County) =

District in Ilam province, Iran

Central District (Darreh Shahr County) Persian: بخش مرکزی شهرستان دره‌شهر
- District
- Location within Iran Location within Ilam Province
- Coordinates: 33°08′52″N 47°23′53″E
- Country: Iran
- Province: Ilam
- County: Darreh Shahr
- Capital: Darrehshahr

Population (2016)
  - Total: 39,562
- Time zone: UTC+3:30 (IRST)

The Central District of Darreh Shahr County (Persian: بخش مرکزی شهرستان دره‌شهر) is in Ilam province, Iran. Its capital is the city of Darrehshahr.

== Demographics ==
=== Population ===
At the time of the 2006 National Census, the district's population was 34,983 in 7,176 households. The following census in 2011 counted 38,716 people in 9,723 households. The 2016 census measured the population of the district as 39,562 inhabitants in 10,874 households.

=== Administrative divisions ===
Central District (Darreh Shahr County) Population
| Administrative Divisions | 2006 | 2011 | 2016 |
|---|---|---|---|
| Aramu RD | 7,089 | 8,017 | 8,010 |
| Zarrindasht RD | 9,680 | 9,987 | 9,652 |
| Darrehshahr (city) | 18,214 | 20,712 | 21,900 |
| Total | 34,983 | 38,716 | 39,562 |
RD = Rural District
