= Darreh Shahr County =

County in Ilam Province, Iran

Darreh Shahr County Persian: شهرستان دره‌شهر
- County
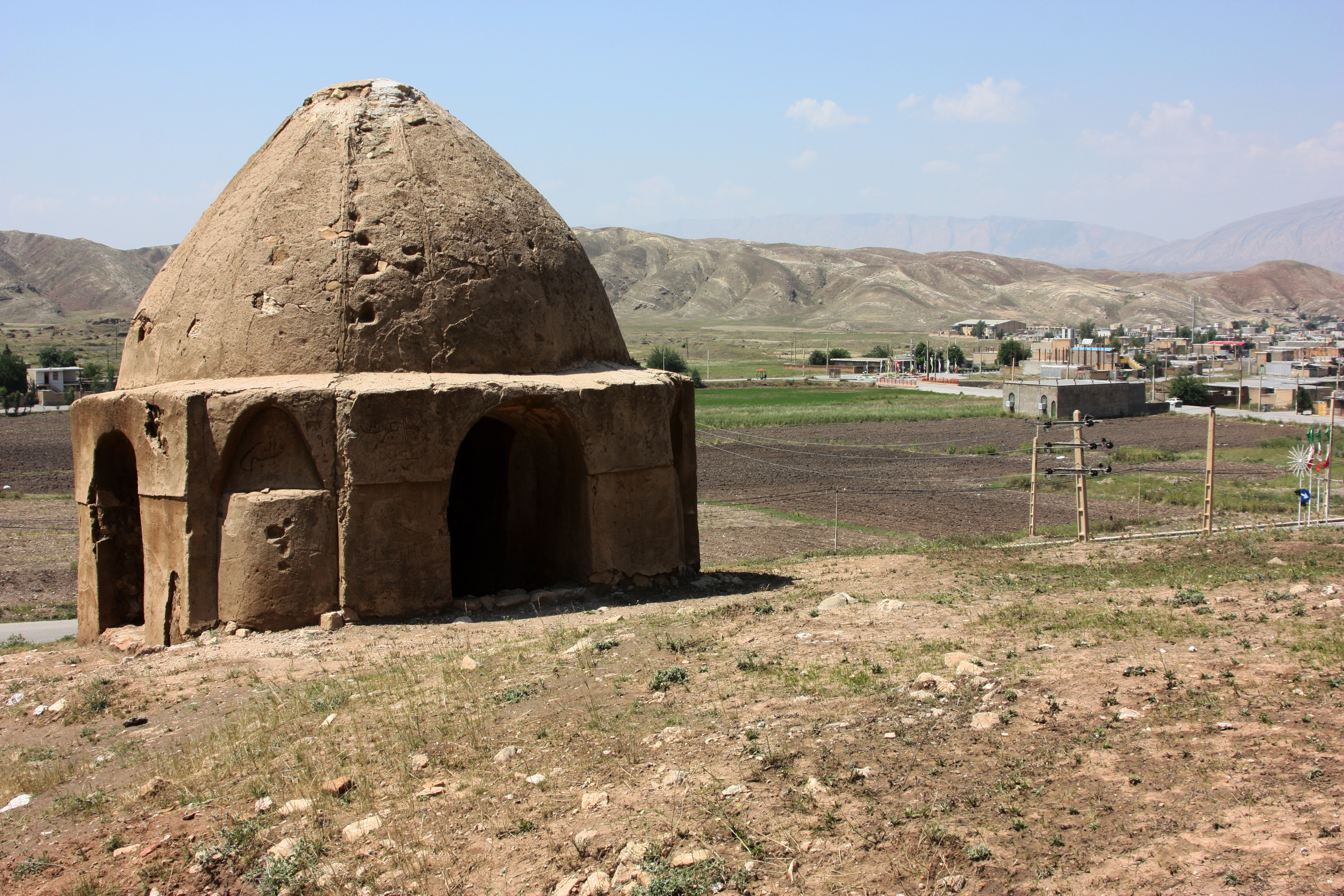
- Darreh Shahr Fire Temple

- Location of Darreh Shahr County in Ilam province (right, pink)

- Location of Ilam province in Iran
- Coordinates: 33°01′N 47°35′E
- Country: Iran
- Province: Ilam
- Capital: Darrehshahr
- Districts: Central, Mazhin

Government
  - Governor: Hossein Ali Mousavi

Area
  - Total: 1,480 km^{2} (570 sq mi)

Population (2016)
  - Total: 43,708
  - Density: 29.5/km^{2} (76.5/sq mi)
- Time zone: UTC+3:30 (IRST)

Darreh Shahr County (Persian: شهرستان دره‌شهر) is in Ilam province, Iran. Its capital is the city of Darrehshahr.

== History ==
Darehshahr County consists of two parts: Central and Majin.

== Demographics ==
=== Population ===
At the time of the 2006 census, the county's population was 56,346 in 11,487 households. The following census in 2011 counted 59,551 people in 14,867 households. The 2016 census measured the population of the county as 43,708 in 12,012 households.

=== Administrative divisions ===
Darreh Shahr County's population history and administrative structure over three consecutive censuses are shown in the following table.

Darreh Shahr County Population
Administrative Divisions	2006	2011	2016
Central District	34,983	38,716	39,562
Aramu RD	7,089	8,017	8,010
Zarrindasht RD	9,680	9,987	9,652
Darrehshahr (city)	18,214	20,712	21,900
Badreh District (Note: Transferred to Badreh County)	16,478	16,096	
Dustan RD	4,862	4,394	
Hendmini RD	7,841	7,453	
Badreh (city)	3,775	4,249	
Mazhin District	4,885	4,437	4,146
Kulkani RD	1,719	1,610	1,384
Mazhin RD	3,166	2,827	1,250
Mazhin (city) (Note: Merger of several villages)			1,512
Total	56,346	59,551	43,708
RD = Rural District

== Geography ==
Abdanan County and Badreh County used to be districts of Darreh Shahr County before 1995 and 2013, respectively, after which they were upgraded to county status themselves.

Neighboring counties

- Abdanan – south
- Badreh – northwest
- Rumeshkhan County, Lorestan – north
- Pol-e Dokhtar County, Lorestan – east

Darreh Shahr County has an area of 1,480 km^{2} (570 mi^{2}), bounded by Kabir Kuh range to the south and Seymareh and Karkheh rivers to the north. The plains between the mountains and the rivers are fertile farmlands being cultivated for millennia. There are about 1,220 km^{2} (470 mi^{2}) of woodlands in the county, most of which are on the higher altitudes of the Kabir Kouh range to the south. The Kabir Kouh Protected Area is the most important conservation area in the county. It was established in 2001 and has an area of 179 km^{2} (69 mi^{2}) between the elevations of 950-2790m on the northern, greener, side of Kabir Kouh.

Rivers

- Seymareh River
- Karkheh River
- Darreh Shahr River
- Sikan River

Lakes

- Seymareh Dam Lake

=== Climate ===
Darreh Shahr County has a warm climate with hot dry summers and mild wet winters. July–August maximum daily temperature can as high as 48 °C (118 °F) during heat waves, which are frequent in summer due to proximity to the Iraqi desert. Winters are generally mild but occasionally goes below freezing.

The long-term average annual precipitation is 465.1 mm (18.31 in) at Darreh Shahr Weather Station. The lowest annual precipitation happened during the farming season of 2007–2008 with a figure as low as 188.2 mm (7.41 in). The highest annual precipitation used to be 872.7 mm (34.36 in) in 1990–1991, after which, a deadly flood ensued. This record was broken in 2018–2019 with 1,046.5 mm (41.20 in), which again resulted in a heavy flooding in southwestern Iran.

There is almost no precipitation through the months of June to September. Darreh Shahr used to receive snow once or twice a year in the past, but nowadays it has become less and less likely thanks to global warming. Hail and lightning storms are not uncommon in Fall and Spring and have devastating effects on crops and the farming-dependent economy of the county.

Western air masses from the Mediterranean and Black Sea are cause autumn and winter rains in the province, and Sudanese and Red Sea and Saudi Arabia currents are also effective in winter and spring rains and cause warm weather in summer. The vast plains of Iraq create a low-pressure high-temperature low-humidity weather cell over the area.

=== Seymareh landslide ===
In prehistoric times, a huge landslide occurred in the south eastern parts of Kabir Kuh range. The incident is described in an article on Royal Geographical Society, published in 1937 by Harrison and Falcon. Based on their observations, the landslide is 9 by 2.5 mi (14.5 by 4.0 km) in area and 1,000 to 1,500 ft (300 to 460 m) in thickness; amounting to a body of material of about 30 km^{3} (7.2 mi^{3}), some of which is found around 10 mi (16 km) from their original location. The reason for this colossal event is very likely to have been a catastrophic earthquake. Due to its enormity, the Seymareh Landslide is believed to be the largest one recorded in the eastern hemisphere.

== Economy ==
The economy of Darreh Shahr is mostly based on agriculture and animal husbandry. As of February 2018, Darreh Shahr farmers produce more than 190,000 tons of agricultural and 23,000 tons of livestock products annually. Darreh Shahr has about 40,000 ha (99,000 acres) of farming irrigated and dry lands. The agriculture market in Darreh Shahr is worth around US$17.7m.

Production of some major crops in Darreh Shahr County in tons, 2019.
Crop	Annual Production
Cucumber	100,000
Wheat	30,000
Broad bean	9,000
Melon	4,500
Maize	1,200
Canola	700
Mung Bean	500
Grapes	245

Darreh Shahr is a large producer of daffodils with about 230 hectares (570 acres) of cultivated farms and an average annual production of 7 million flowers, most of which is marketed in cities of Tehran, Isfahan, Ahvaz and Arak.

The majority of the people living in urban areas, especially Darreh Shahr, work in construction and services trades sector. As the county seat, Darreh Shahr hosts almost all of the government offices of the county, therefore many people work for the government.

Despite the rather solid agriculture sector, the industry sector is emerging and small. Darreh Shahr Industrial City hosts a number of SMEs, the most prominent of which are Seif Ghostar Food Products Company and Madakto Steel Cord Company, the first and only steel cord producer in Iran. Darreh Shahr Flour Factory, established in 1993, is a wheat flour milling plant with an installed capacity of 120 metric tons per day. The factory mainly serves the domestic and local markets with limited exports to Iraq in recent years.

== Tourism ==
Darreh Shahr County received more than 400,000 visitors in 2018, 120,000 of which visited the county in Spring alone. Darreh Shahr is the most visited county in Ilam Province. Darreh Shahr is home to 145 nationally registered monuments, buildings and historical sites. Darreh Shahr is built next to the ancient city of Madaktu, an important city in Elam civilization. The city has been destroyed and reconstructed several times in history, each time changing name. Darreh Shahr county has been a popular settlement area throughout history because of the abundance of nearby natural resources, specifically the proximity of Kabir Kouh range as a source of water, fertile soil, woodlands, and wildlife.

Darreh Shahr Fire Temple is a four-arched building which is locally called Taaq. Originally the building was constructed by rubble stone and gypsum, and has recently been repaired.

Gavmishan Bridge is located in the south of Darreh Shahr, in the beginning of a gorge with the same name on the outskirts of Kabir Kuh, is an ancient bridge with three arches that has been repaired as of 2008. Each of its arches is placed at 5.5 m (18 ft) intervals from each other. This Sasanian bridge has been constructed in the confluence of the Seymareh and Kashkan rivers. Although it has been repaired several times during the past, it is almost in a ruined state now.

Sheikh Makan Fort is located 6 kilometers southeast of Darreh Shahr. The ruins of this fort can be seen in the entrance of Sheikh Makan village. Construction materials indicate that it belongs to the Qajar era. The walls of the fort are delicately made of stone and gypsum. There are also the remains of a watermill.

There are many crevices and caves. One of them is known as the Kulkani Cave. The entrance of the cave is 30 meters long, and there is a small pond built of stone and sarouj (plaster of lime and ash or sand). In addition, there are 12 other caves similar to the dwellings of pre-historic men. Earthenware pieces and other objects belonging to the mid 1st millennium BC have been discovered in this cave.

Jaber Mausoleum, which resembles the Tomb of Daniel in Susa with a northern entrance, is 15 m long and 9 m wide with 8 pillars. There is an adytum in its southern wall which is 180 cm high. At the lower part, there is an inscription with plaster work adorned by floral design and sacred verses. This mausoleum is one of the important places of pilgrimage in Darreh Shahr.

Baba Seifedin Mausoleum is located in the north east of Darreh Shahr, on the outskirts of a hill known as Chahar Taq. There are two tombs in the mausoleum without any description on the tombstones. There is a small inscription on the top of the entrance door which indicates the date of its repair. The materials of the building are stone, gypsum, and brick. There are several trees around the mausoleum which are hundreds of years old.

Tikhan (or Tiqan) is located among the agricultural lands in Jamshid Abad village north east of Darreh Shahr. In excavations carried out, 4 levels have been discovered. The earthenware objects found in the first floor are simple. Moreover, some flint blades and carved stones have been discovered there as well.

Koozeh Garan Hill is about 5.5 kilometers from Tikhan Hill, and is larger and older than it. Its antiquity dates back to the late 3rd millennium BC, but its first floor dates to the Sasanian era. Some colored and engraved earthenware objects have been discovered in the basement of the building, the nature of which suggests the area to have once been involved in pottery production. Certain parts of lower floors had been allocated as burial areas. The upper graves belong to the Zoroastrian period.

Cham Namesht Bridge is an 18-arch bridge constructed on the Seymareh river 4 kilometers north of Darreh Shahr facing the Chamkalan village. The antiquity of this bridge dates back to the Sasanian era, but it was used for centuries afterward. The bridge is directly connected to the remains of the Sasanian monuments in Darreh Shahr.

Bahram-e Choobin Gorge, a narrow and high valley, is one of the most important and strategic points of the region, located in the western side of the Darreh Shahr - Pol Dokhtar road. This gorge, which is also called the Bahram Hunting Ground, contains several historical monuments, including the ruins of a Sasanian castle built of stone and gypsum, with stone stairs and four connected water reservoirs (Ab Anbar).

Imamzadeh Saleh is located in Majeen Graveyard near Darreh Shahr. This quadrangular two-story building has a pyramid shaped dome. The main tomb is located on the first floor, which is constructed entirely of brick with a herringbone arch. On the second floor, there is a tomb covered with stone, gypsum, and earthenware, dating back to the 15th century (8th century AH). Though in disrepair, this and the interior plaster works of the Imamzadeh are unique and counted as worthy vestiges of this period.

== Gallery ==
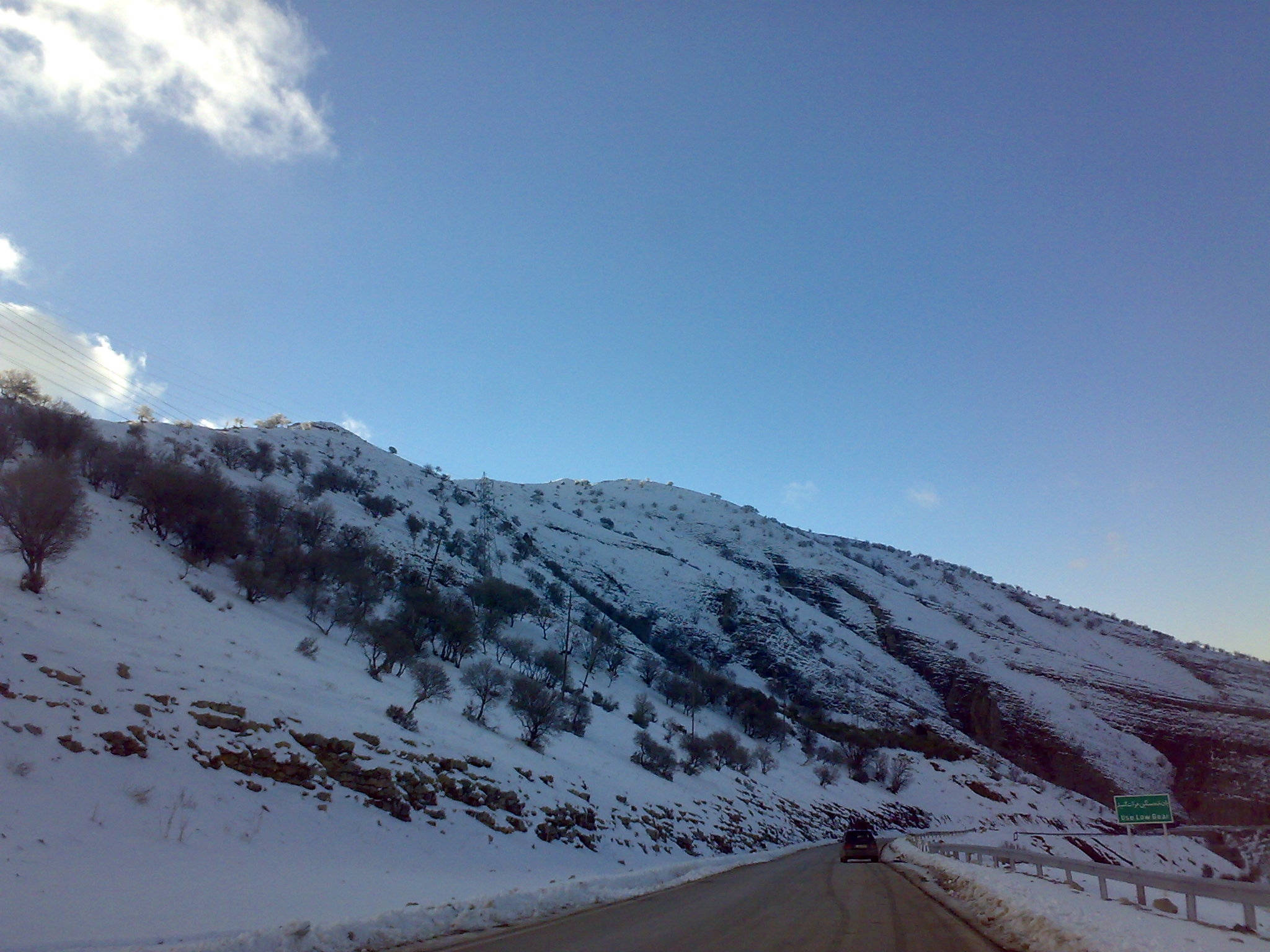
Kabir Kouh in winter.

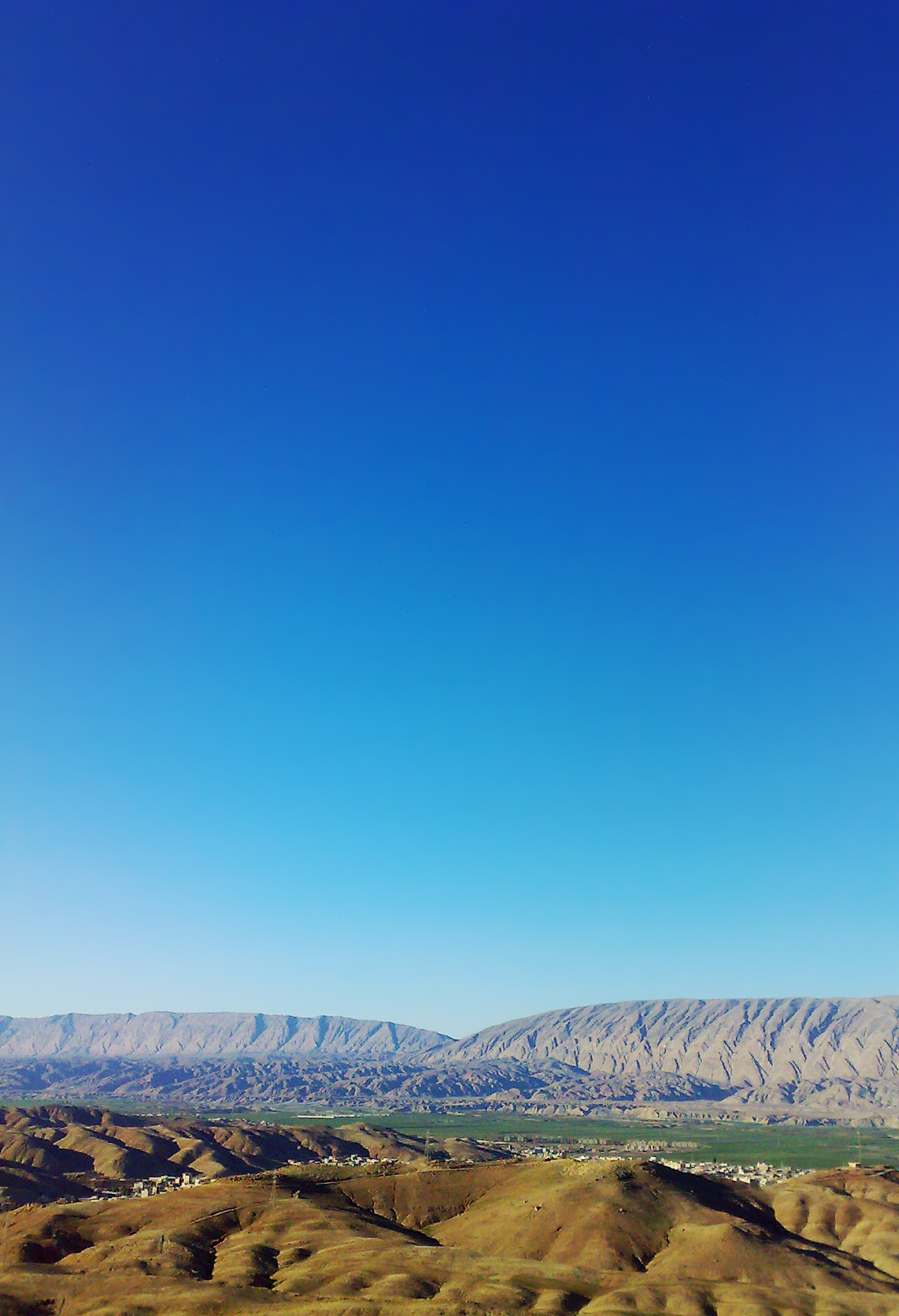
Darreh Shahr in spring.

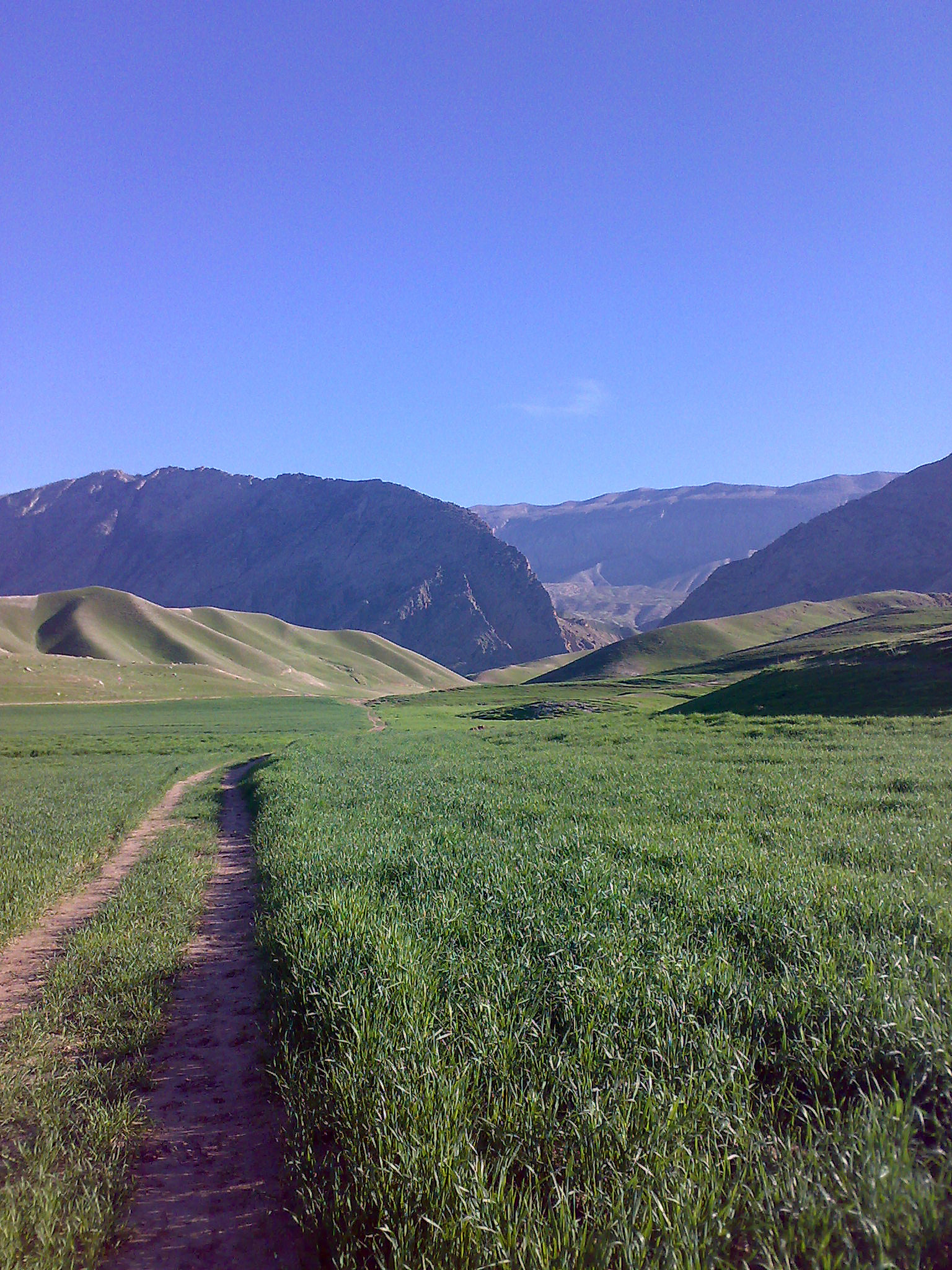
Wheat farms near Sheykh Makan

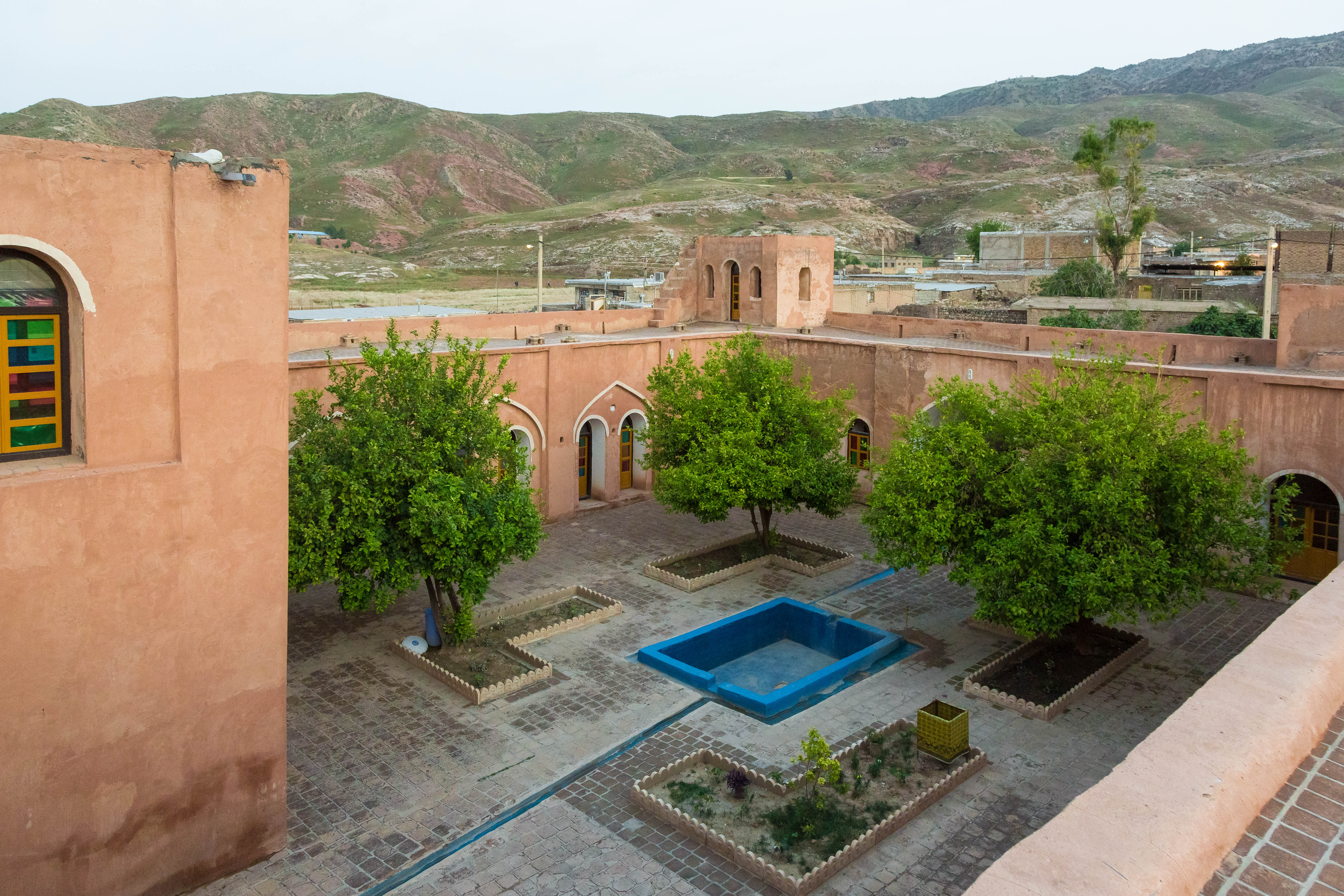
Mir-Gholam Castle

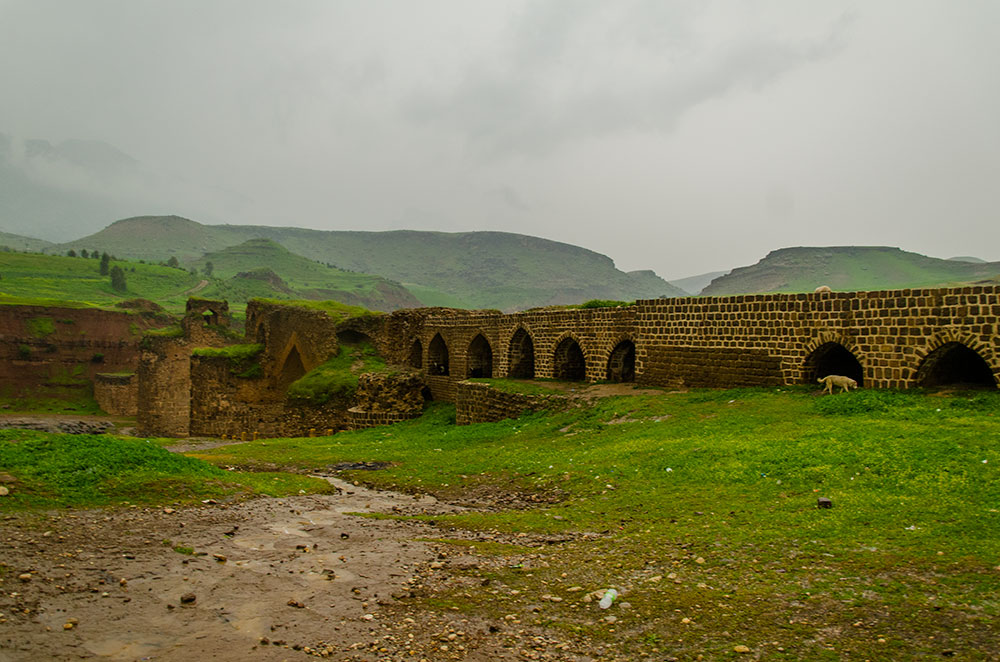
Gavmishan Bridge over the River Karkheh

== See also ==
Media related to Darreh Shahr County at Wikimedia Commons
