= Ahangaran, Iran =

Ahangaran (Persian: آهنگران) may refer to several places in Iran:

- Ahangaran, Ilam
- Ahangaran, Kerman
- Ahangaran, Gilan-e Gharb, Kermanshah Province
- Ahangaran, Ravansar, Kermanshah Province
- Ahangaran, Sahneh, Kermanshah Province
- Ahangaran, Khuzestan
- Ahangaran, Kurdistan
- Ahangaran, Lorestan
- Ahangaran, Markazi
- Ahangaran, Nishapur, Razavi Khorasan Province
- Ahangaran, Rashtkhvar, Razavi Khorasan Province
- Ahangaran-e Olya, Lorestan Province
- Ahangaran-e Sofla, Lorestan Province
