= Kalam (disambiguation) =

Kalam or Ilm al-Kalam (lit. "science of discourse") is a term for methodic theology in Islam.

Kalam may also refer to:

== Philosophy ==
- Kalam cosmological argument, a cosmological argument for the existence of God rooted in the Ilm al-Kalam heritage
- Jewish Kalam, an early medieval style of Jewish philosophy that evolved in response to the Islamic Kalam, which in turn was a reaction against Aristotelian philosophy

== Languages ==
- Kalam languages, a small family of languages spoken in New Guinea
  - Kalam language, one of the Kalam languages spoken in New Guinea

== Places ==
- Kalam (union council), an administrative unit in Swat district, Khyber Pakhtunkhwa, Pakistan
- Kalam Valley, a valley along the upper reaches of the Swat River in Khyber Pakhtunkhwa, Pakistan
- Kalam, East Azerbaijan, a village in East Azerbaijan Province, Iran
- Kalam, Hormozgan, a village in Hormozgan Province, Iran
- Kolm-e Bala, a village in Ilam Province, Iran
- Kolm-e Pain, a village in Ilam Province, Iran

== People ==
- Kalam Bey (died 1307), first ruler of Karasids Emirate
- Kalam Mooniaruck (born 1983), English-born Mauritian footballer
- A. P. J. Abdul Kalam (1931–2015), an Indian scientist and former President of India
- Abul Kalam Azad (1888–1958), an Indian scholar and senior political leader of the Indian independence movement
- Murad Kalam, American Muslim writer
- Shahrom Kalam (born 1985), Malaysian footballer
- Tõnu Kalam, American orchestral pianist and conductor
- Mir Kalam (born 1990), Pakistani-Pashtun politician

== See also ==
- Qalam (disambiguation)
- Kalami (disambiguation)
- Kaalam (disambiguation)
- Kalam (film), 2016 Indian Tamil-language film
- Kalam TV, a social networking website, based primarily on video sharing
- Kalam summer festival, a cultural and recreational event, held annually in the scenic valley of Kalam and Mahodand
