= Kolm =

Kolm may refer to:

== Places ==
- Kolm Rural District, an administrative division of Badreh County, Ilam province, Iran
- Kolm-e Bala, Iran
- Kolm-e Pain, Iran
- Kollum, a village in the Netherlands

== Other uses ==
- Kolm (surname)
- KOLM, a radio station
- Olympia Regional Airport (ICAO airport code KOLM)
