= Zarangush =

Village in Ilam province, Iran

Zarangush Persian: زرانگوش
- Village

- Location within Iran Location within Ilam Province
- Coordinates: 33°13′34″N 47°13′01″E
- Country: Iran
- Province: Ilam
- County: Badreh
- District: Hendmini
- Rural District: Zarangush

Population (2016)
  - Total: 1,444
- Time zone: UTC+3:30 (IRST)

Zarangush (Persian: زرانگوش) (Note: Also romanized as Zarāngūsh and Zarangūsh) is a village in, and the capital of, Zarangush Rural District of Hendmini District, Badreh County, Ilam province, Iran.

== Demographics ==
=== Population ===
At the time of the 2006 National Census, the village's population was 1,605 in 307 households, when it was in Hendmini Rural District of the former Badreh District of Darreh Shahr County. The following census in 2011 counted 1,580 people in 412 households. The 2016 census measured the population of the village as 1,444 people in 409 households, by which time the district had been separated from the county in the establishment of Badreh County. The rural district was transferred to the new Hendmini District, and Zarangush was transferred to Zarangush Rural District created in the district. It was the most populous village in its rural district.
