= Abhar-e Pain =

Abhar-e Pain ابهرپايين
- Village
- Location within Iran
- Coordinates: 33°17′46″N 47°03′49″E
- Country: Iran
- Province: Ilam
- County: Badreh
- Bakhsh: central
- Rural District: Dustan

Population (2006)
  - Total: 914
- Time zone: UTC+3:30 (IRST)
  - Summer (DST): UTC+4:30 (IRDT)

Abhar-e Pain (Persian: ابهرپايين, also Romanized as Abhar-e Pā'īn) is a village in Dustan Rural District, Badreh District, Darreh Shahr County, Ilam Province, Iran. At the 2006 census, its population was 914, in 181 families. The village is populated by Kurds.
