= Dul Golab =

Dul Golab دول گلاب
- Village
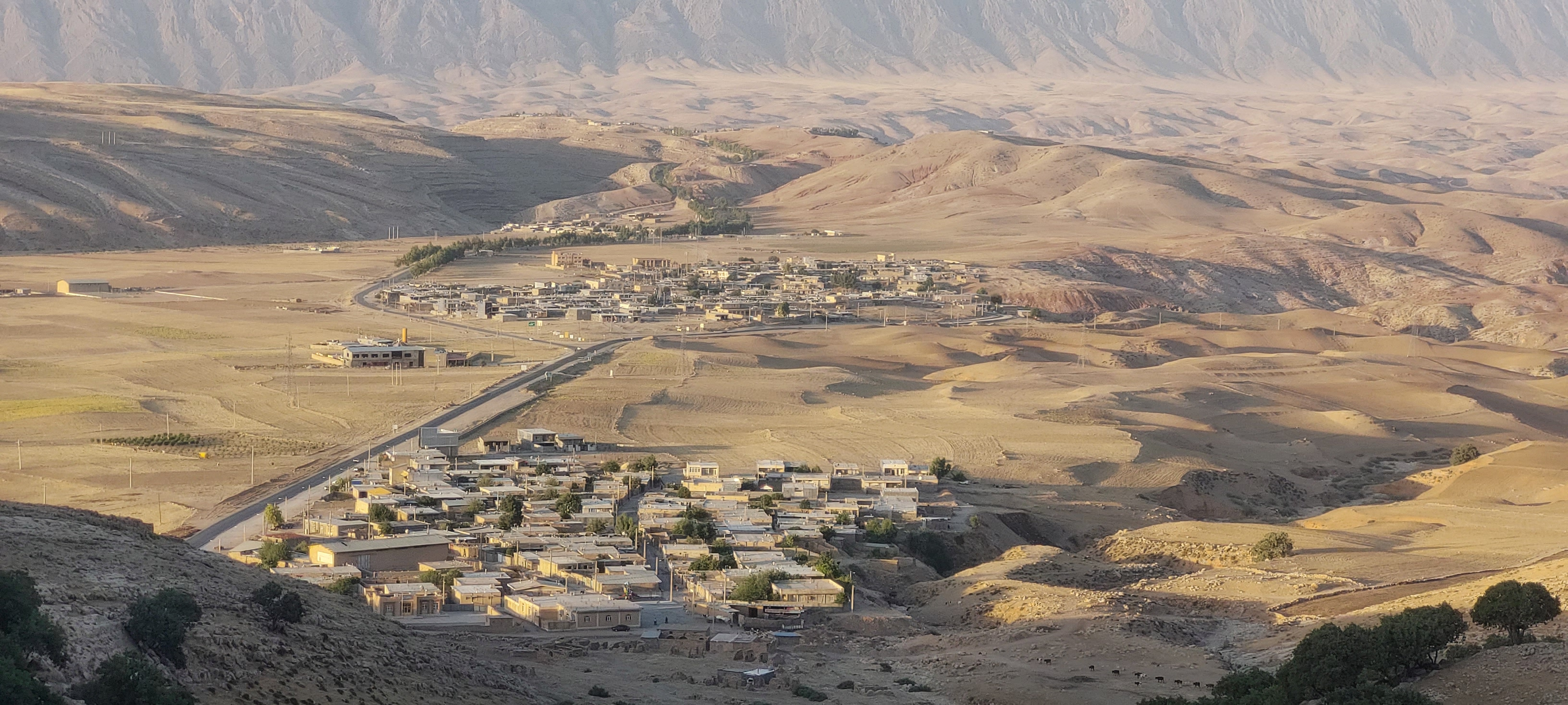
- Ahangaran-e Kaviani (top), Cheshmeh Shirin (center), and Dul Golab (bottom)

- Location within Iran
- Coordinates: 33°15′55″N 47°08′47″E
- Country: Iran
- Province: Ilam
- County: Badreh
- Bakhsh: Hendmini
- Rural District: Hendmini

Population (2006)
  - Total: 355
- Time zone: UTC+3:30 (IRST)
  - Summer (DST): UTC+4:30 (IRDT)

Dul Golab (Persian: دول گلاب, also Romanized as Dūl Golāb) is a village in Hendmini Rural District, Hendmini District, Badreh County, Ilam Province, Iran. At the 2006 census, its population was 355, in 69 families. The village is populated by Lurs.
