= Abcheshmeh =

Village in Ilam province, Iran

Abcheshmeh Persian: آب‌چشمه
- Village
- Location within Iran Location within Ilam Province
- Coordinates: 33°17′21″N 47°06′38″E
- Country: Iran
- Province: Ilam
- County: Badreh
- District: Hendmini
- Rural District: Hendmini

Population (2016)
  - Total: 658
- Time zone: UTC+3:30 (IRST)

Abcheshmeh (Persian: آب‌چشمه) (Note: Also romanized as Ab Cheshmeh and Āb Cheshmeh) is a village in, and the capital of, Hendmini Rural District of Hendmini District, Badreh County, Ilam province, Iran. The previous capital of the rural district was the village of Cheshmeh Shirin, now a city.

== Demographics ==
=== Ethnicity ===
The village is populated by Lurs.

=== Population ===
At the time of the 2006 National Census, the village's population was 891 in 167 households, when it was in the former Badreh District of Darreh Shahr County. The following census in 2011 counted 710 people in 166 households. The 2016 census measured the population of the village as 658 people in 169 households, by which time the district had been separated from the county in the establishment of Badreh County. The rural district was transferred to the new Hendmini District.
