= Shahrak-e Vali-ye Asr Sar Tang-e Bahram Khani =

Village in Ilam province, Iran

Shahrak-e Vali-ye Asr Sar Tang-e Bahram Khani Persian: شهرک ولیعصر سرتنگ بهرام خانی
- Village
- Location within Iran Location within Ilam Province
- Coordinates: 33°20′38″N 46°59′39″E
- Country: Iran
- Province: Ilam
- County: Badreh
- District: Central
- Rural District: Dustan

Population (2016)
  - Total: 1,931
- Time zone: UTC+3:30 (IRST)

Shahrak-e Vali-ye Asr Sar Tang-e Bahram Khani (Persian: شهرک ولیعصر سرتنگ بهرام خانی) (Note: Also romanized as Shahrak-e Valī-ye ‘Aşr Sar Tang-e Bahrām Khānī; also known as Shahrak-e Valī‘aşr and Shahrak-e Valī-ye ‘Aşr) is a village in, and the capital of, Dustan Rural District of the Central District of Badreh County, Ilam province, Iran.

== Demographics ==
=== Ethnicity ===
The village is populated by Kurds.

=== Population ===
At the time of the 2006 National Census, the village's population was 2,284 in 488 households, when it was in the former Badreh District of Darreh Shahr County. The following census in 2011 counted 2,217 people in 598 households. The 2016 census measured the population of the village as 1,931 people in 540 households, by which time the district had been separated from the county in the establishment of Badreh County. The rural district was transferred to the new Central District. It was the most populous village in its rural district.
