= Kulm =

Kulm is a German language toponym derived from the Latin culmen, meaning hill, and may refer to:

== Places ==
=== Austria ===
- Kulm bei Weiz, a municipality in Styria
- Kulm am Zirbitz, a municipality in Styria
- Kulm (ski flying venue), a ski jumping site at Tauplitz, Salzkammergut

=== Bohemia, now Czech Republic ===
- The German name of Chlumec (Český Krumlov District) in Bohemia, the scene of:
  - Battle of Kulm, 1813 defeat to Napoleon by Austrians, Prussians, and Russians
- The German name of Chlumec (Ústí nad Labem District) in Bohemia

=== Germany ===
- Rauher Kulm, a mountain near Kemnath, Upper Palatinate
- Kulmbach, a stream and town in Bavarian district of Upper Franconia
- Kulm (Saalfeld), a hill near Saalfeld

=== Iran ===
- Kulm-e-Bala, a village in Ilam Province
- Kulm-e-Pain, a village in Ilam Province

=== Prussia, now Poland ===
- Culm/Kulm town in Prussia, now Chełmno
  - Kulm law, a Prussian Law (type of town charter)
  - Kulmerland, an historic region and diocese in Prussia

=== Switzerland ===
- Harderkulm, a viewpoint on the Harder near Interlaken in canton of Bern
- Kulm (district) in canton of Aargau
- Kulm, a hamlet next to the Simplon Pass, canton of Valais
- Oberkulm and Unterkulm, two related villages in the canton of Aargau
- Pilatus Kulm, the name of the top cable car station on the Pilatus near Luzern
- Rigi Kulm, the highest peak of the Rigi massif, canton of Schwyz, near Luzern
- Kulm Hotel (disambiguation)

=== United States ===
- Kulm, North Dakota

== People ==
- Eryk Kulm (born 1990), Polish actor

== See also ==
- Culm (disambiguation)
