= Zifal =

Zifal زيفل
- Village
- Location within Iran
- Coordinates: 33°28′02″N 46°40′47″E
- Country: Iran
- Province: Ilam
- County: badreh
- Bakhsh: markazi
- Rural District: Alishervan

Population (2006)
  - Total: 101
- Time zone: UTC+3:30 (IRST)
  - Summer (DST): UTC+4:30 (IRDT)

Zifal (Persian: زيفل, also Romanized as Zīfal and Zeyfel; also known as Zeynal and Zīnal) is a village in Alishervan Rural District, in the central District of badreh County, Ilam Province, Iran. At the 2006 census, its population was 101, in 20 families. The village is populated by Kurds.
