= Pagal-e Garab =

Village in Ilam province, Iran

Pagal-e Garab Persian: پاگل گراب
- Village
- Location within Iran Location within Ilam Province
- Coordinates: 33°27′31″N 46°44′40″E
- Country: Iran
- Province: Ilam
- County: Badreh
- District: Central
- Rural District: Alishervan

Population (2016)
  - Total: 1,037
- Time zone: UTC+3:30 (IRST)

Pagal-e Garab (Persian: پاگل گراب) (Note: Also known as and Garāb, Gorab, Pākal Gadāb, Pākal Garāb, Pakal-e Garab, Pākal-e Garāb, and Pay-e Kal-e Garāb) is a village in, and the capital of, Alishervan Rural District of the Central District of Badreh County, Ilam province, Iran.

== Demographics ==
=== Ethnicity ===
The village is populated by Kurds.

=== Population ===
At the time of the 2006 National Census, the village's population was 1,139 in 203 households, when it was in Mish Khas Rural District of the Central District of Ilam County. The following census in 2011 counted 1,169 people in 261 households. The 2016 census measured the population of the village as 1,037 people in 276 households, by which time the rural district had been separated from the district in the establishment of Sivan District. Pagal-e Garab was transferred to Alishervan Rural District created in the new district. It was the most populous village in its rural district.

In 2023, the rural district was separated from the county to join the Central District of Badreh County.
