= Kuln =

Kuln may refer to:

- Kolm-e Bala
- Kolm-e Pain
