= Talkhab, Dustan =

Talkhab تلخاب
- Village
- Location within Iran
- Coordinates: 33°28′58″N 46°46′33″E
- Country: Iran
- Province: Ilam
- County: Darreh Shahr
- Bakhsh: Badreh
- Rural District: Dustan

Population (2006)
  - Total: 93
- Time zone: UTC+3:30 (IRST)
  - Summer (DST): UTC+4:30 (IRDT)

Talkhab (Persian: تلخاب, also Romanized as Talkhāb; also known as Talkhān) is a village in Dustan Rural District, Badreh District, Darreh Shahr County, Ilam Province, Iran. At the 2006 census, its population was 93, in 14 families.
