= Khushqadam =

Khushqadam or Hoshkadem is a male given name. It may refer to:

- Sayf al-Din Khushqadam (c. 1404–1467), Mamluk sultan from 1461 to 1467
- Khushqadam Khusravov (born 1993), Tajikistani male sambist
- Khvosh Qadam, village in Ilam Province, Iran
- Mosque of Khushqadam el-Ahmadi, mosque in Cairo, Egypt
