= Mian Rah-e Jaber =

Mian Rah-e Jaber ميان راه جابر
- Village
- Location within Iran
- Coordinates: 33°24′03″N 46°56′04″E
- Country: Iran
- Province: Ilam
- County: Darreh Shahr
- Bakhsh: Badreh
- Rural District: Dustan

Population (2006)
  - Total: 112
- Time zone: UTC+3:30 (IRST)
  - Summer (DST): UTC+4:30 (IRDT)

Mian Rah-e Jaber (Persian: ميان راه جابر, also Romanized as Mīān Rāh-e Jāber; also known as Jāber and Mīānrāh) is a village in Dustan Rural District, Badreh District, Darreh Shahr County, Ilam Province, Iran. At the 2006 census, its population was 112, in 24 families. The village is populated by Kurds.
