= Torshak =

Torshak or Tarashok or Tareshok (Persian: ترشك) may refer to:

- Torshak, Ilam
- Torshak, Khuzestan
