= Torshak, Ilam =

Torshak ترشك
- Village
- Location within Iran
- Coordinates: 33°27′00″N 46°50′00″E
- Country: Iran
- Province: Ilam
- County: Darreh Shahr
- Bakhsh: Badreh
- Rural District: Dustan

Population (2006)
  - Total: 24
- Time zone: UTC+3:30 (IRST)
  - Summer (DST): UTC+4:30 (IRDT)

Torshak (Persian: ترشك) is a village in Dustan Rural District, Badreh District, Darreh Shahr County, Ilam Province, Iran. At the 2006 census, its population was 24, in 4 families.
