= Khvosh Qadam =

Khvosh Qadam خوش قدم
- Village
- Location within Iran
- Coordinates: 33°25′34″N 46°51′50″E
- Country: Iran
- Province: Ilam
- County: Darreh Shahr
- Bakhsh: Badreh
- Rural District: Dustan

Population (2006)
  - Total: 106
- Time zone: UTC+3:30 (IRST)
  - Summer (DST): UTC+4:30 (IRDT)

Khvosh Qadam (Persian: خوش قدم, also Romanized as Khowsh Qadam and Khūsh Qadam) is a village in Dustan Rural District, Badreh District, Darreh Shahr County, Ilam Province, Iran. At the 2006 census, its population was 106, in 18 families. The village is populated by Kurds.
