= Cheshmeh Shirin, Ilam =

City in Ilam province, Iran

Cheshmeh Shirin Persian: چشمه شيرين
- City
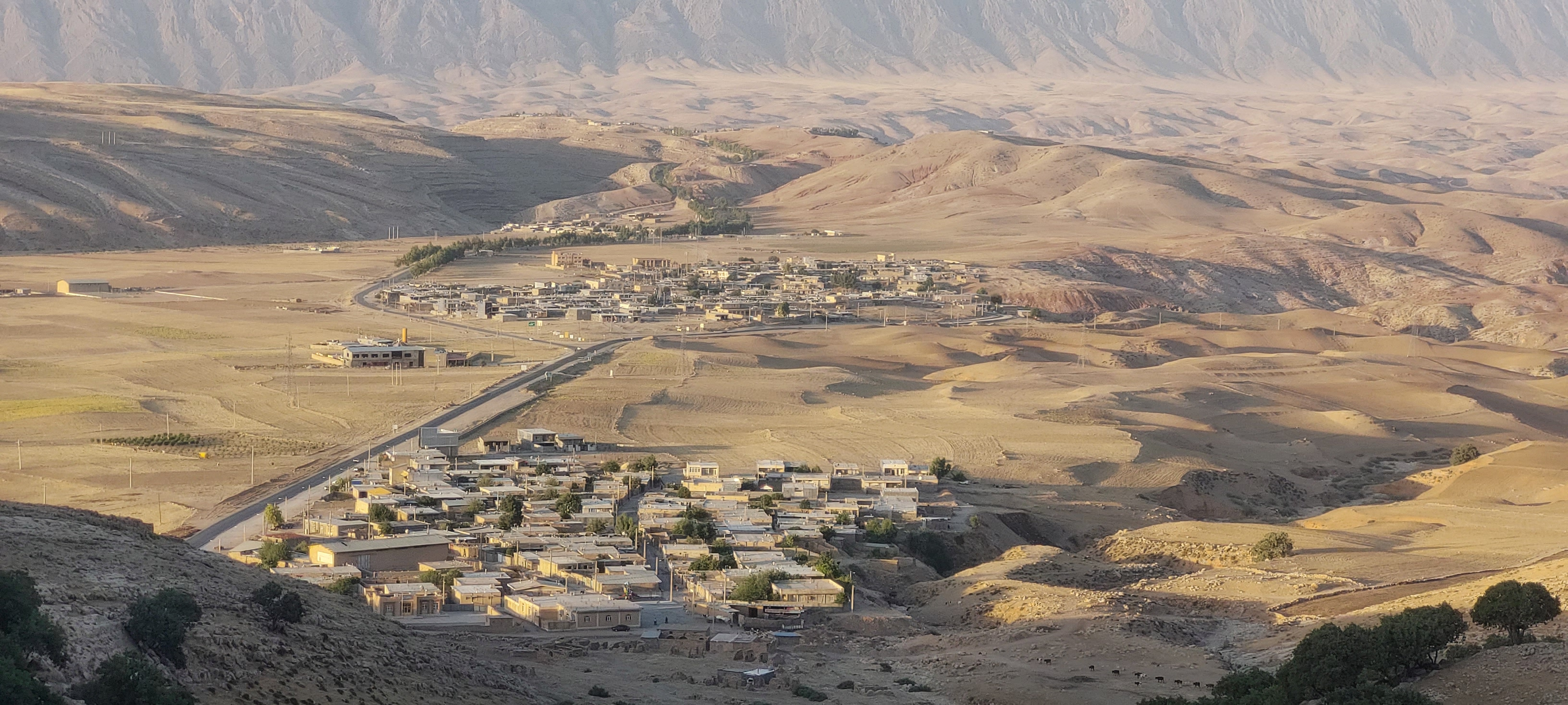
- Ahangaran-e Kaviani (top), Cheshmeh Shirin (center), and Dul Golab (bottom)

- Location within Iran Location within Ilam Province
- Coordinates: 33°16′23″N 47°09′34″E
- Country: Iran
- Province: Ilam
- County: Badreh
- District: Hendmini

Population (2016)
  - Total: 1,125
- Time zone: UTC+3:30 (IRST)

Cheshmeh Shirin (Persian: چشمه شيرين) (Note: Also romanized as Cheshmeh Shīrīn) is a city in, and the capital of, Hendmini District of Badreh County, Ilam province, Iran. As a village, it was the capital of Hendmini Rural District until its capital was transferred to the village of Abcheshmeh.

== Demographics ==
=== Ethnicity ===
The city is populated by Lurs.

=== Population ===
At the time of the 2006 National Census, Cheshmeh Shirin's population was 1,172 in 261 households, when it was a village in Hendmini Rural District of the former Badreh District of Darreh Shahr County. The following census in 2011 counted 1,168 people in 311 households. The 2016 census measured the population as 1,125 people in 320 households, by which time the district had been separated from the county in the establishment of Badreh County. The rural district was transferred to the new Hendmini District.

Cheshmeh Shirin was elevated to the status of a city after the census.
