= Kulm Hotel =

Kulm Hotel may refer to:

- Gornergrat Kulm Hotel, Switzerland
- Kulm Hotel St. Moritz, Switzerland

== See also ==
- Kulm (disambiguation)
