= Ahangaran-e Kaviani =

Ahangaran-e Kaviani اهنگران كاوياني
- Village
- Location within Iran
- Coordinates: 33°16′50″N 47°10′10″E
- Country: Iran
- Province: Ilam
- County: Darreh Shahr
- Bakhsh: Badreh
- Rural District: Hendmini

Population (2006)
  - Total: 155
- Time zone: UTC+3:30 (IRST)
  - Summer (DST): UTC+4:30 (IRDT)

Ahangaran-e Kaviani (Persian: اهنگران كاوياني, also Romanized as Āhangarān-e Kāvīānī; also known as Āhangarān) is a village in Hendmini Rural District, Badreh District, Darreh Shahr County, Ilam Province, Iran. At the 2006 census, its population was 155, in 33 families. The village is populated by Lurs.
