= Kolm Castle =

Castle in Ilam Province, Iran

Kolm castle
- قلعه کلم

General information
- Type: Castle
- Location: Badreh County, Iran

Kolm castle (Persian: قلعه کلم) is a historical castle located in Badreh County in Ilam Province, The longevity of this fortress dates back to the Medes.
