= Rezaabad, Ilam =

Rezaabad رضااباد
- Village
- Location within Iran
- Coordinates: 33°26′55″N 46°46′40″E
- Country: Iran
- Province: Ilam
- County: Ilam
- Bakhsh: Sivan
- Rural District: Alishervan

Population (2006)
  - Total: 31
- Time zone: UTC+3:30 (IRST)
  - Summer (DST): UTC+4:30 (IRDT)

Rezaabad (Persian: رضااباد, also Romanized as Reẕāābād; also known as Cham Kāv, Chenār Bāshī, and Chenār Bāshī-ye Reẕāābād) is a village in Alishervan Rural District, in the Sivan District of Ilam County, Ilam Province, Iran. At the 2006 census, its population was 31, in 7 families. The village is populated by Kurds.
