= Zarangush Rural District =

Rural district in Ilam province, Iran

Zarangush Rural District Persian: دهستان زرانگوش
- Rural District
- Location within Iran Location within Ilam Province
- Coordinates: 33°12′36″N 47°10′49″E
- Country: Iran
- Province: Ilam
- County: Badreh
- District: Hendmini
- Capital: Zarangush

Population (2016)
  - Total: 3,558
- Time zone: UTC+3:30 (IRST)

Zarangush Rural District (Persian: دهستان زرانگوش) is in Hendmini District of Badreh County, Ilam province, Iran. Its capital is the village of Zarangush.

== History ==
After the 2011 National Census, Badreh District was separated from Darreh Shahr County in the establishment of Badreh County, and Zarangush Rural District was created in the new Hendmini District.

== Demographics ==
=== Population ===
At the time of the 2016 census, the rural district's population was 3,558 in 920 households. The most populous of its five villages was Zarangush, with 1,444 people.
