= Qalam (disambiguation) =

A qalam is a type of pen made from a dried reed, used for Islamic calligraphy.

Qualam may also refer to:

- Al-Qalam, a sura of the Qur'an
- Qalam, Iran, a village in Iran

== See also ==
- Kalam (disambiguation)
