= Weiz (disambiguation) =

Weiz may refer to:

- Weiz, a small town of 9.445 inhabitants in the eastern part of Styria, Austria

- SC Weiz, an Austrian association football club founded in 1924

- Weiz District (German: Bezirk Weiz, a district of the state of Styria in Austria
- Puch bei Weiz, a municipality in the Weiz District in Styria, Austria
- Kulm bei Weiz, a municipality in the Weiz District in Styria, Austria
- Gschaid bei Weiz, Naas, in the Weiz District in Styria, Austria
- WEIZAC (Weizmann Automatic Computer), the first computer in Israel

== See also ==
- Weiz (surname)
