= Reichendorf =

- Former municipality
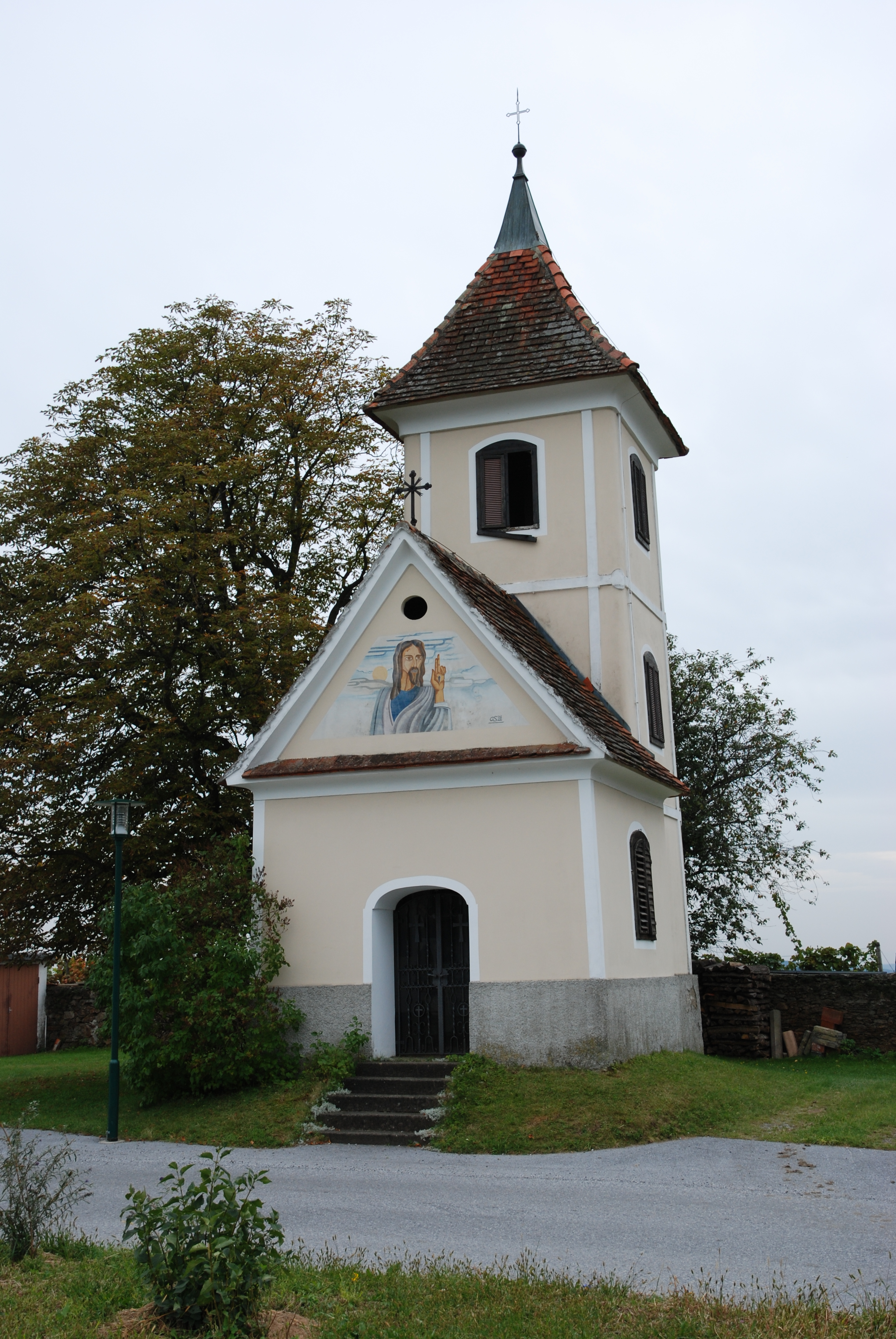
- Reichendorf chapel

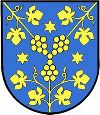
- Coat of arms

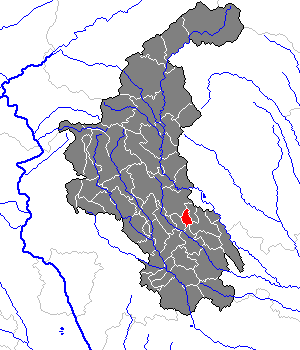
- Location within Weiz district

- Location within Austria
- Coordinates: 47°10′48″N 15°45′00″E
- Country: Austria
- State: Styria
- District: Weiz

Area
  - Total: 4.93 km^{2} (1.90 sq mi)
- Elevation: 390 m (1,280 ft)

Population (1 January 2016)
  - Total: 625
  - Density: 127/km^{2} (328/sq mi)
- Time zone: UTC+1 (CET)
  - Summer (DST): UTC+2 (CEST)
- Postal code: 8212
- Area code: 03113
- Vehicle registration: WZ
- Website: www.reichendorf. steiermark.at

Reichendorf is a former municipality in the district of Weiz in the Austrian state of Styria. Since the 2015 Styria municipal structural reform, it is part of the municipality Pischelsdorf am Kulm.
