= Pischelsdorf am Kulm =

- Municipality
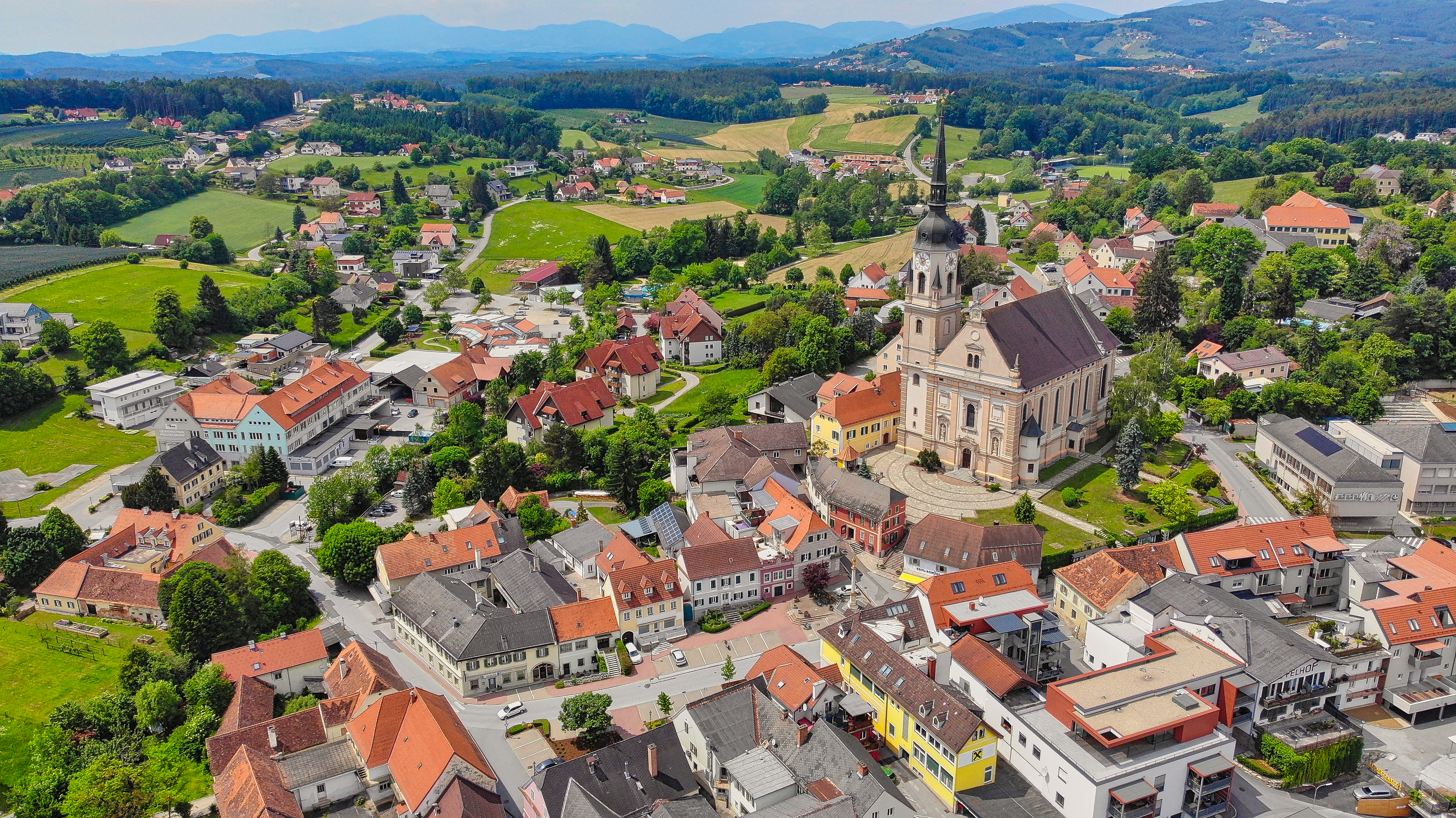

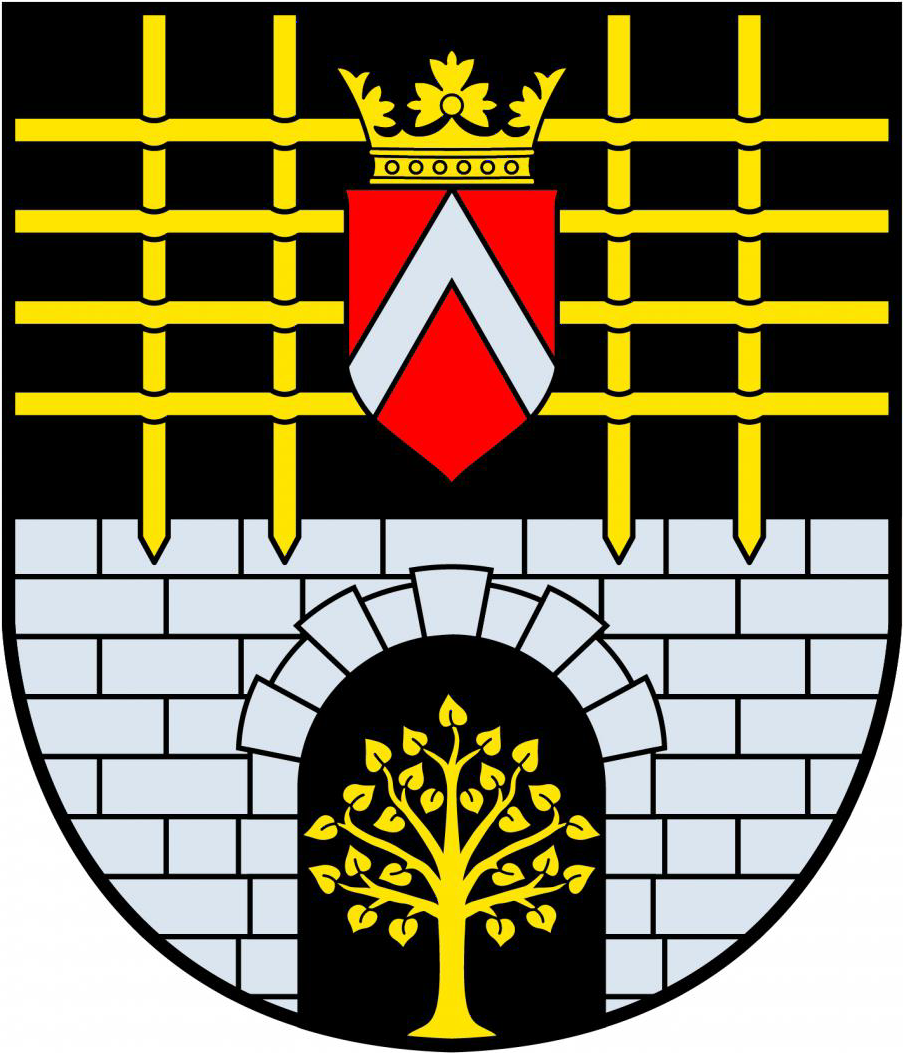
- Coat of arms

- Location within Austria
- Coordinates: 47°10′26″N 15°48′24″E
- Country: Austria
- State: Styria
- District: Weiz

Government
  - Mayor: Herbert Baier (ÖVP)

Area
  - Total: 28.14 km^{2} (10.86 sq mi)
- Elevation: 378 m (1,240 ft)

Population (2018-01-01)
  - Total: 3,712
  - Density: 131.9/km^{2} (341.7/sq mi)
- Time zone: UTC+1 (CET)
  - Summer (DST): UTC+2 (CEST)
- Postal code: 8212
- Area code: +43 3113
- Website: www.pischelsdorf.com

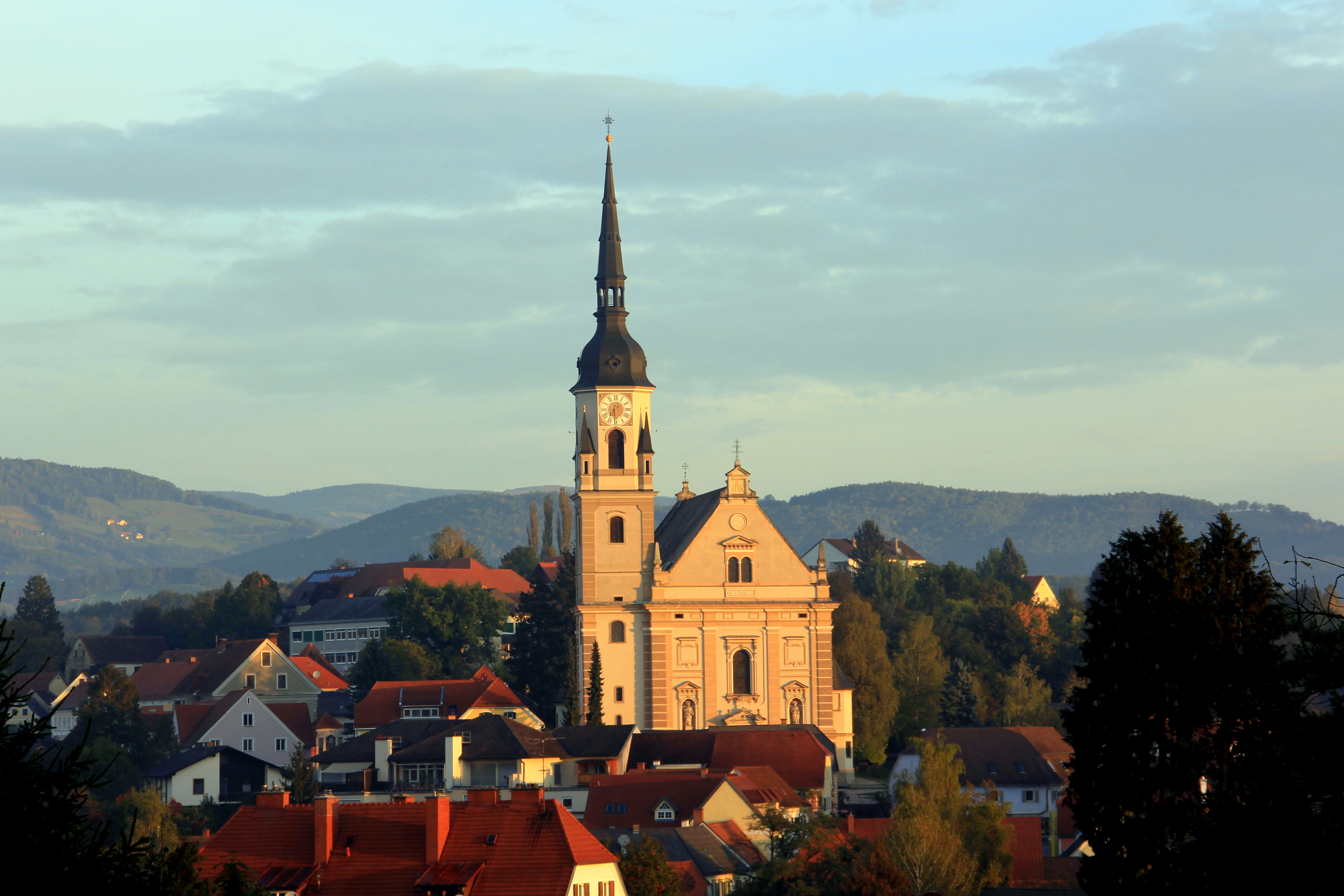
Church Pfarrkirche Pischelsdorf am Kulm

Pischelsdorf am Kulm is since 2015 a municipality in Weiz District in Styria, Austria. The area of the town covers 28.14 square kilometres (10.86 sq mi). In the Styria municipal structural reform, the new town was formed by merging Pischelsdorf in der Steiermark with the smaller villages of Reichendorf and Kulm bei Weiz, to reduce costs and ease election of town officials.

== History ==
The municipality was founded as part of the Styria municipal structural reform, at the end of 2014, with closure of the communities Pischelsdorf in der Steiermark, Kulm bei Weiz and Reichendorf. A petition, from the town of Reichendorf against the merger was brought to the Verfassungsgerichtshof constitutional court, but was not successful.

== Geography ==
=== Municipal organization ===
The municipal territory includes the following 8 sections or seven Katastralgemeinden (population and area: as of 1 January 2015):

- Hart (297)
- Kleinpesendorf (176)
- Kulming (127)
- Pischelsdorf in der Steiermark (1444)
- Reichendorf (621)
- Rohrbach am Kulm (357)
- Romatschachen (402)
- Schachen am Römerbach (206)
- Hart (364.75 ha)
- Kulming (187.69 ha)
- Pischelsdorf (453.95 ha)
- Reichendorf (493.86 ha)
- Rohrbach (399.95 ha)
- Romatschachen (534.32 ha)
- Schachen (378.81 ha)

== Politics ==
The first municipal vote of the new town, on 22 March 2015, had the following results:

Partei	2015		
Partei	Stimmen	%	Mandate
ÖVP	1136	51,22	11
SPÖ	459	20,69	4
FPÖ	410	18,49	4
ALU-Alternative Liste Umweltschutz (GRÜNE)	213	9,60	2
Wahlberechtigte	3.045		
Wahlbeteiligung	73,76 %		

- The mayor is Herbert Baier (ÖVP)
- The council has 21 seats and assigned as follows:
- 11 ÖVP
- 4 SPÖ
- 4 FPÖ
- 2 ALU-Alternative Liste Umweltschutz (Grüne)

== Emergency Services ==
Ensuring local security, the emergency service and the hazard or disaster response is handled in the market town Pischelsdorf by the Police Inspectorate Pischelsdorf. The Red Cross Ortsstelle Pischelsdorf and four volunteer fire departments ensured the fire brigades serve the following areas: Fire Brigade Pischelsdorf with the KG Pischelsdorf, KG Schachen, KG Hart as part of the KG Oberrettenbach and KG Rothgmos of the Altgemeinde Oberrettenbach, the Feuerwehr Reichendorf with the KG Reichendorf, the Feuerwehr Rohrbach with the KG Kulming, KG Rohrbach am Kulm and the Fire Brigade Feuerwehr Romatschachen with the KG Romatschachen.

== Culture and sights ==
- Pfarrkirche Hll. Peter und Paul in Pischelsdorf.
- One of the biggest events in the region is the Pischeldorferstrasse Folk Festival (Volksfest) and Pischeldorferstrasse Management Exhibition. It is held annually on Ascension Day at the terrain around the grounds of Oststeirerhalle. It is organized as the traditional festival of the volunteer fire department Pischelsdorf; a special feature is the Agricultural Fair in tent hall and the large amusement park. The specialty of the festival, well known all over the town's borders, is grilled sausages cooked on a large charcoal grill in front of the festive guests.
