= Kulmerau =

Former municipality, canton of Lucerne

- Former municipality
- View of Kulmerau
- Location of Kulmerau
- Location within Switzerland Location within Canton of Lucerne
- Coordinates: 47.2532°N 8.0879°E
- Country: Switzerland
- Canton: Lucerne
- District: Sursee
- Municipality: Triengen

Population (2000)
  - Total: 212
- Time zone: UTC+01:00 (CET)
  - Summer (DST): UTC+02:00 (CEST)
- SFOS number: 1090
- ISO 3166 code: CH-LU
- Website: Profile (in German),

Kulmerau is a former municipality in the Sursee district of the canton of Lucerne, Switzerland. Since 2005 it has been part of the municipality of Triengen, together with Wilihof. It lies on a terrace on the eastern slope of the Lucerne part of the Suhre valley.

== History ==
Kulmerau is first mentioned in 1179 as Cholunbronwo. Alemannic grave finds point to early settlement. From 1325 half of the Twing (local lordship) of Kulmerau belonged to the lordship of Büron. It passed to Lucerne in 1455 and was part of the Lucerne bailiwick (Vogtei) of Büron-Triengen until 1798. From 1845 to 2004 Kulmerau was a municipality of its own, but it remained part of the parish of Triengen. The chapel built in Kulmerau in 1371 was rebuilt in 1591 and dedicated to Saint Christina.

The local customary law, the Twinglibell, shows Kulmerau as a cooperative association under personal law (Personalrecht). At that time the commons (Allmend) of this village with its three-field system were already in individual use; the actual privatization of the common property came only with the division of 1812, which also covered the forest. Until the middle of the 19th century textile cottage industry offered other ways of earning a living in Kulmerau. Agriculture still shapes the village.

Kulmerau had 519 inhabitants in 1850, 318 in 1900, 273 in 1950 and 212 in 2000.

== Bibliography ==
- F. Kurmann, Das Luzerner Suhrental im 18. Jahrhundert, 1985
- Adolf Reinle, Das Amt Sursee, 1956, pp. 245–246 (Die Kunstdenkmäler des Kantons Luzern, 4)
