= Schmiedrued =

- Municipality
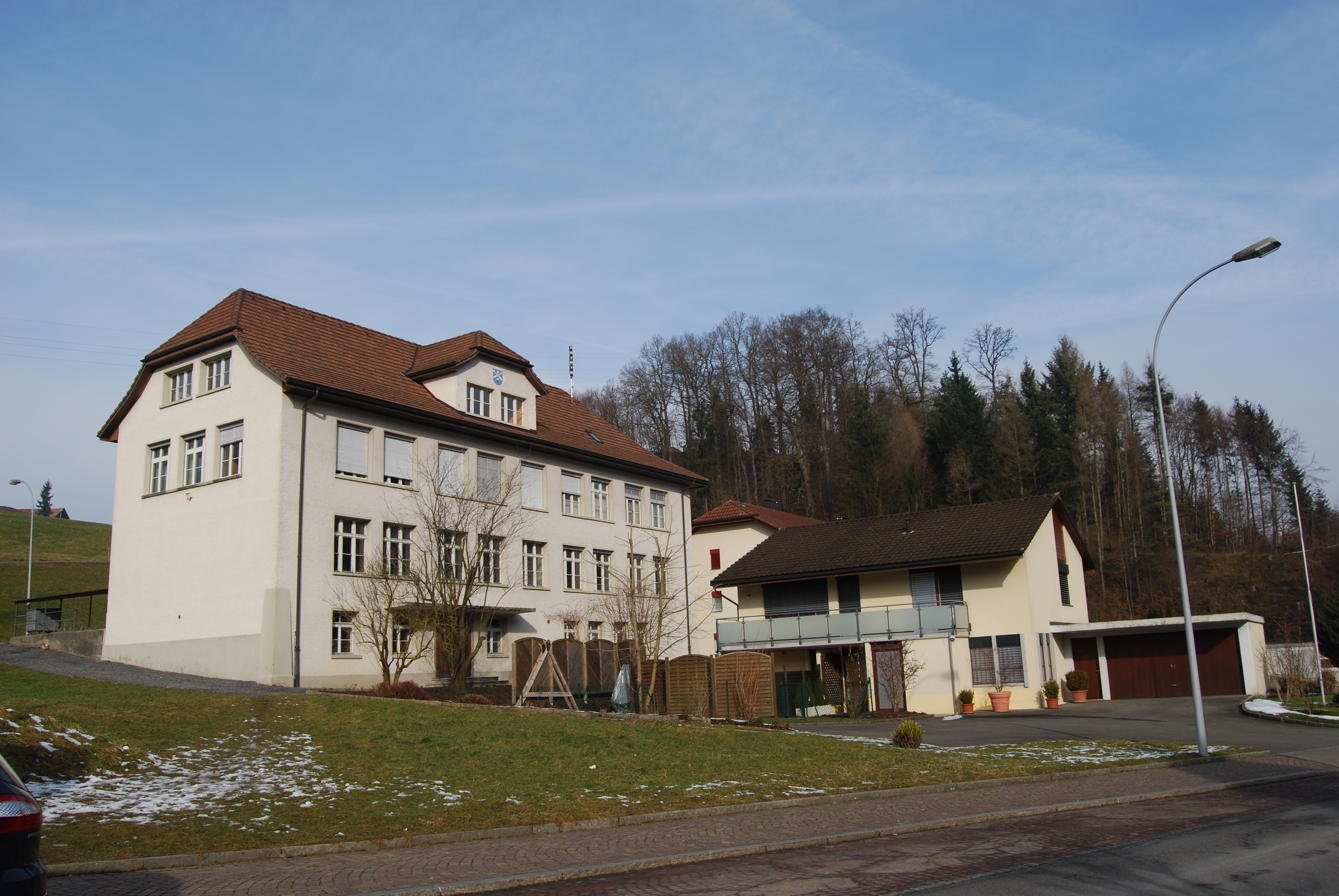

- Flag Coat of arms
- Location of Schmiedrued
- Location within Switzerland Location within Canton of Aargau
- Coordinates: 47°16′N 8°7′E
- Country: Switzerland
- Canton: Aargau
- District: Kulm

Area
  - Total: 8.64 km^{2} (3.34 sq mi)
- Elevation: 566 m (1,857 ft)

Population (December 2006)
  - Total: 1,199
  - Density: 139/km^{2} (359/sq mi)
- Time zone: UTC+01:00 (CET)
  - Summer (DST): UTC+02:00 (CEST)
- Postal code: 5046
- SFOS number: 4143
- ISO 3166 code: CH-AG
- Surrounded by: Gontenschwil, Kirchleerau, Moosleerau, Oberkulm, Rickenbach (LU), Schlierbach (LU), Schlossrued, Triengen (LU)
- Website: www.schmiedrued-walde.ch

Schmiedrued is a municipality in the district of Kulm in the canton of Aargau in Switzerland.

== Geography ==
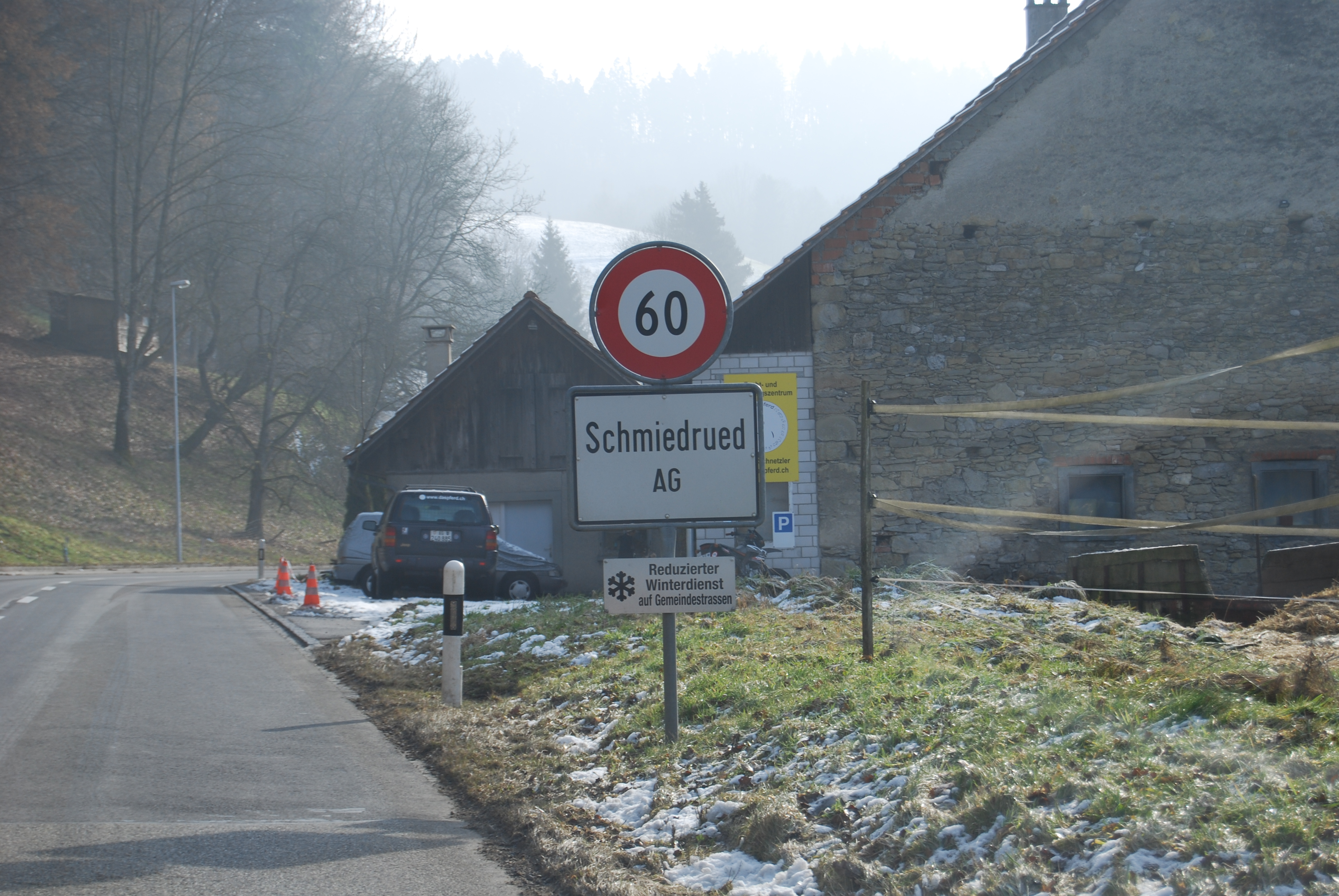
Entrance to Schmiedrued

Schmiedrued has an area, as of 2009, of 8.64 square kilometers (3.34 sq mi). Of this area, 5.55 square kilometers (2.14 sq mi) or 64.2% is used for agricultural purposes, while 2.37 square kilometers (0.92 sq mi) or 27.4% is forested. Of the rest of the land, 0.67 square kilometers (0.26 sq mi) or 7.8% is settled (buildings or roads).

Of the built up area, housing and buildings made up 4.6% and transportation infrastructure made up 2.8%. 25.1% of the total land area is heavily forested and 2.3% is covered with orchards or small clusters of trees. Of the agricultural land, 25.1% is used for growing crops and 33.0% is pastures, while 6.1% is used for orchards or vine crops.

== Coat of arms ==
The blazon of the municipal coat of arms is Azure a Hammer Sable headed Argent and in chief two Oars of the last in Saltire and in chief a Mullet of the same. This may be an example of canting, where the hammer (German: schmied) representing the first part of Schmiedrued and the second part of the name is illustrated by the oars (German: Ruder).

== Demographics ==
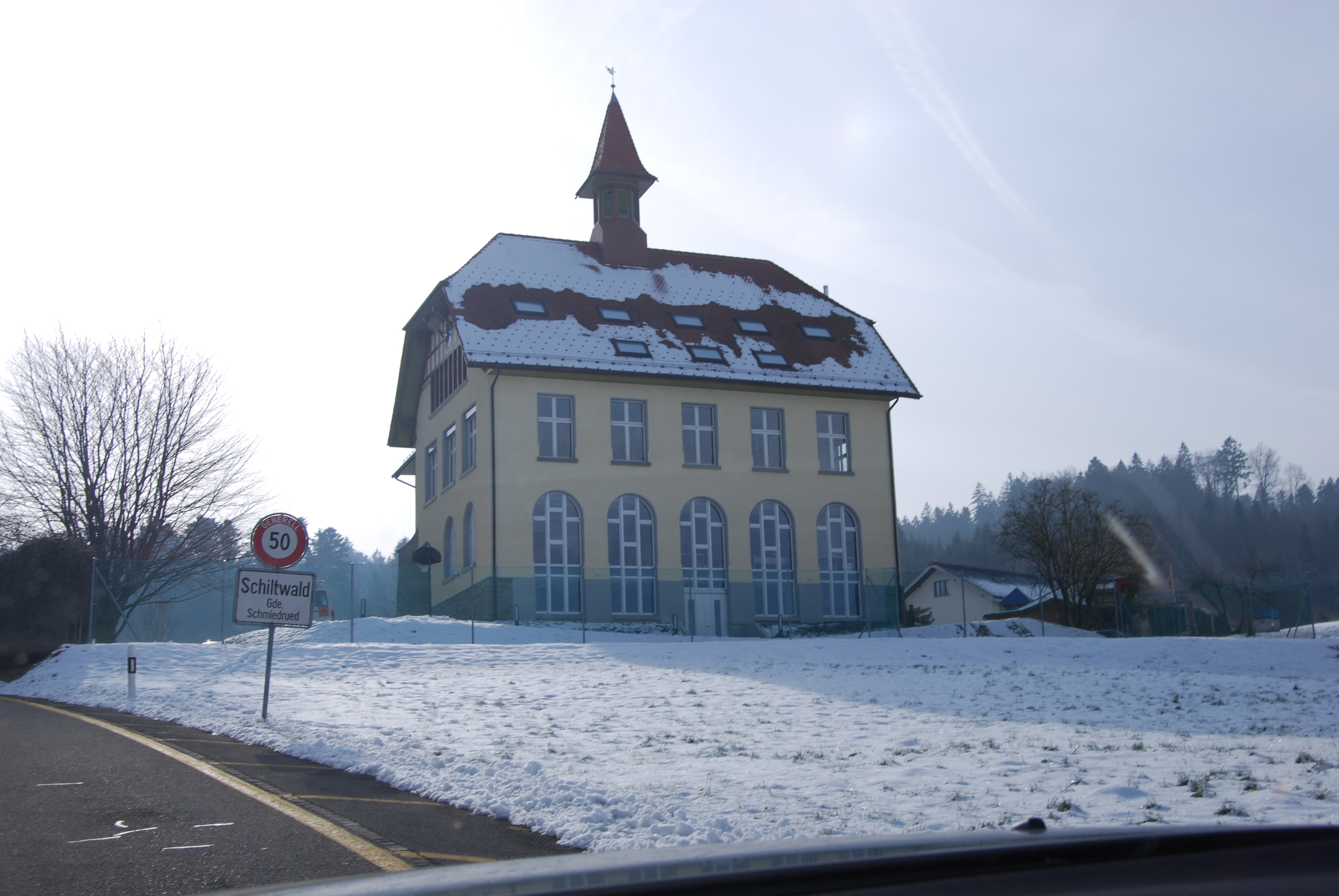
Schoolhouse in Schiltwald village, part of Schmiedrued

Schmiedrued has a population (as of December 2020) of 1,160 As of June 2009, 7.8% of the population are foreign nationals. Over the last 10 years (1997–2007) the population has changed at a rate of 1.9%. Most of the population (as of 2000) speaks German (94.3%), with Albanian being second most common ( 2.8%) and Spanish being third ( 0.7%).

The age distribution, as of 2008, in Schmiedrued is; 116 children or 9.6% of the population are between 0 and 9 years old and 173 teenagers or 14.3% are between 10 and 19. Of the adult population, 136 people or 11.2% of the population are between 20 and 29 years old. 119 people or 9.8% are between 30 and 39, 236 people or 19.5% are between 40 and 49, and 189 people or 15.6% are between 50 and 59. The senior population distribution is 95 people or 7.9% of the population are between 60 and 69 years old, 85 people or 7.0% are between 70 and 79, there are 50 people or 4.1% who are between 80 and 89, and there are 10 people or 0.8% who are 90 and older.

As of 2000, there were 25 homes with 1 or 2 persons in the household, 211 homes with 3 or 4 persons in the household, and 176 homes with 5 or more persons in the household. The average number of people per household was 2.77 individuals. As of 2000, there were 431 private households (homes and apartments) in the municipality, and an average of 2.8 persons per household. In 2008 there were 226 single family homes (or 44.2% of the total) out of a total of 511 homes and apartments. There were a total of 5 empty apartments for a 1.0% vacancy rate. As of 2007, the construction rate of new housing units was 0 new units per 1000 residents.

In the 2007 federal election the most popular party was the SVP which received 52.5% of the vote. The next three most popular parties were the CSP (13%), the SP (8.5%) and the Green Party (6.9%).

In Schmiedrued about 67.7% of the population (between age 25–64) have completed either non-mandatory upper secondary education or additional higher education (either university or a Fachhochschule). Of the school age population (in the 2008/2009 school year), there are 104 students attending primary school, there are 54 students attending secondary school in the municipality.

The historical population is given in the following table:

Historical population
Year	Pop.	±%
1975	964	—
1980	911	−5.5%
1990	1,016	+11.5%
2000	1,230	+21.1%

== Economy ==
As of 2007, Schmiedrued had an unemployment rate of 0.96%. As of 2005, there were 114 people employed in the primary economic sector and about 48 businesses involved in this sector. 122 people are employed in the secondary sector and there are 7 businesses in this sector. 106 people are employed in the tertiary sector, with 21 businesses in this sector.

In 2000 there were 585 workers who lived in the municipality. Of these, 407 or about 69.6% of the residents worked outside Schmiedrued while 103 people commuted into the municipality for work. There were a total of 281 jobs (of at least 6 hours per week) in the municipality. Of the working population, 6.8% used public transportation to get to work, and 56% used a private car.

== Religion ==
From the 2000 census, 208 or 17.1% were Roman Catholic, while 854 or 70.1% belonged to the Swiss Reformed Church.
