= Kolom Rural District =

Rural district in Ilam province, Iran

Kolom Rural District Persian: دهستان کلم
- Rural District
- Location within Iran Location within Ilam Province
- Coordinates: 33°24′07″N 46°54′09″E
- Country: Iran
- Province: Ilam
- County: Badreh
- District: Central
- Capital: Kolom-e Bala

Population (2016)
  - Total: 1,221
- Time zone: UTC+3:30 (IRST)

Kolom Rural District (Persian: دهستان کلم) is in the Central District of Badreh County, Ilam province, Iran. Its capital is the village of Kolom-e Bala.

== History ==
After the 2011 National Census, Badreh District was separated from Darreh Shahr County in the establishment of Badreh County, and Kolom Rural District was created in the new Central District.

== Demographics ==
=== Population ===
At the time of the 2016 census, the rural district's population was 1,221 in 327 households. The most populous of its 16 villages was Kolom-e Bala, with 702 people.
