= Schlossrued =

- Municipality
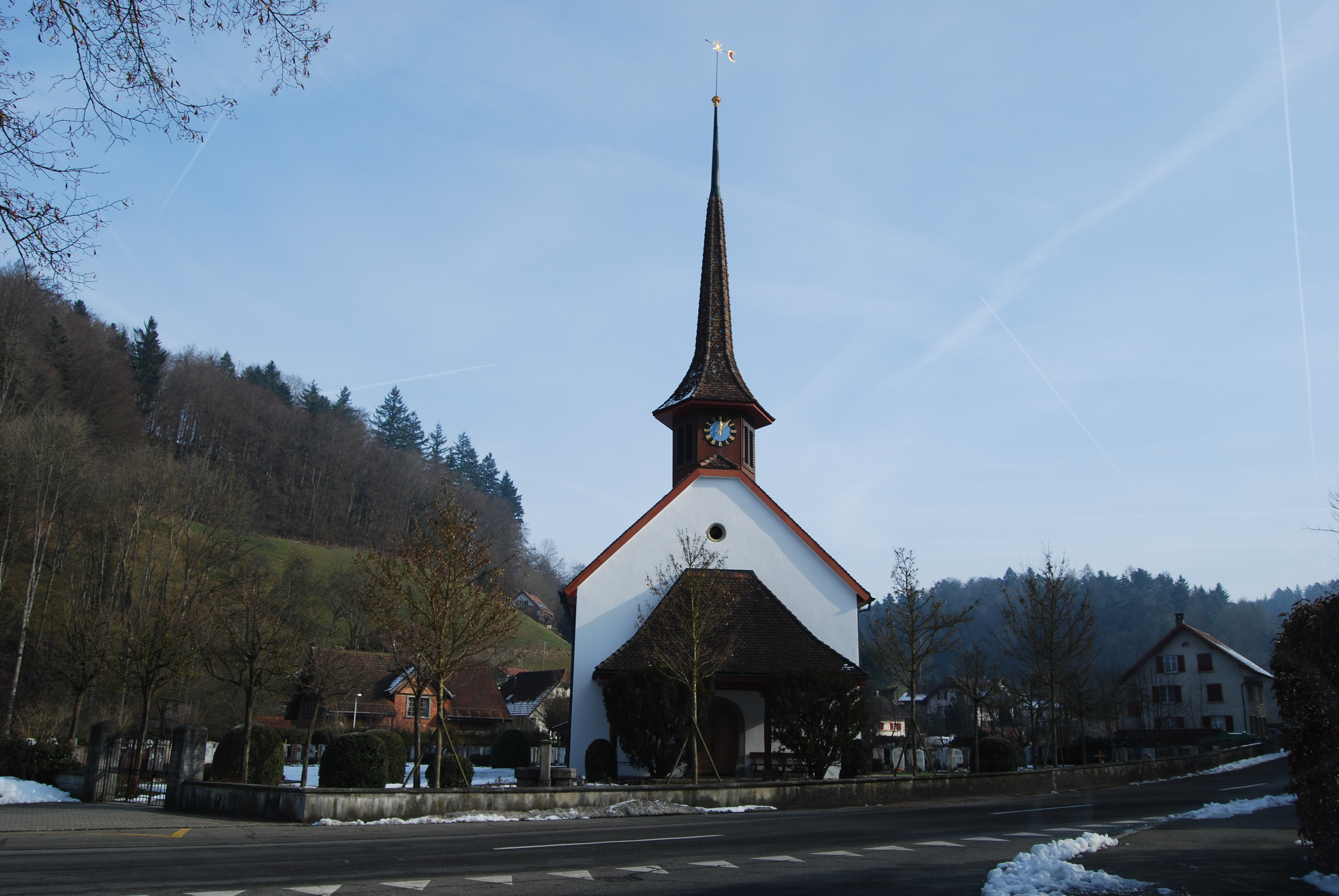

- Flag Coat of arms
- Location of Schlossrued
- Location within Switzerland Location within Canton of Aargau
- Coordinates: 47°18′N 8°06′E
- Country: Switzerland
- Canton: Aargau
- District: Kulm

Area
  - Total: 7.22 km^{2} (2.79 sq mi)
- Elevation: 499 m (1,637 ft)

Population (December 2006)
  - Total: 882
  - Density: 122/km^{2} (316/sq mi)
- Time zone: UTC+01:00 (CET)
  - Summer (DST): UTC+02:00 (CEST)
- Postal code: 5044
- SFOS number: 4142
- ISO 3166 code: CH-AG
- Surrounded by: Kirchleerau, Oberkulm, Schmiedrued, Schöftland, Staffelbach, Unterkulm
- Website: www.schlossrued.ch

Schlossrued is a municipality in the district of Kulm in the canton of Aargau in Switzerland.

== Geography ==
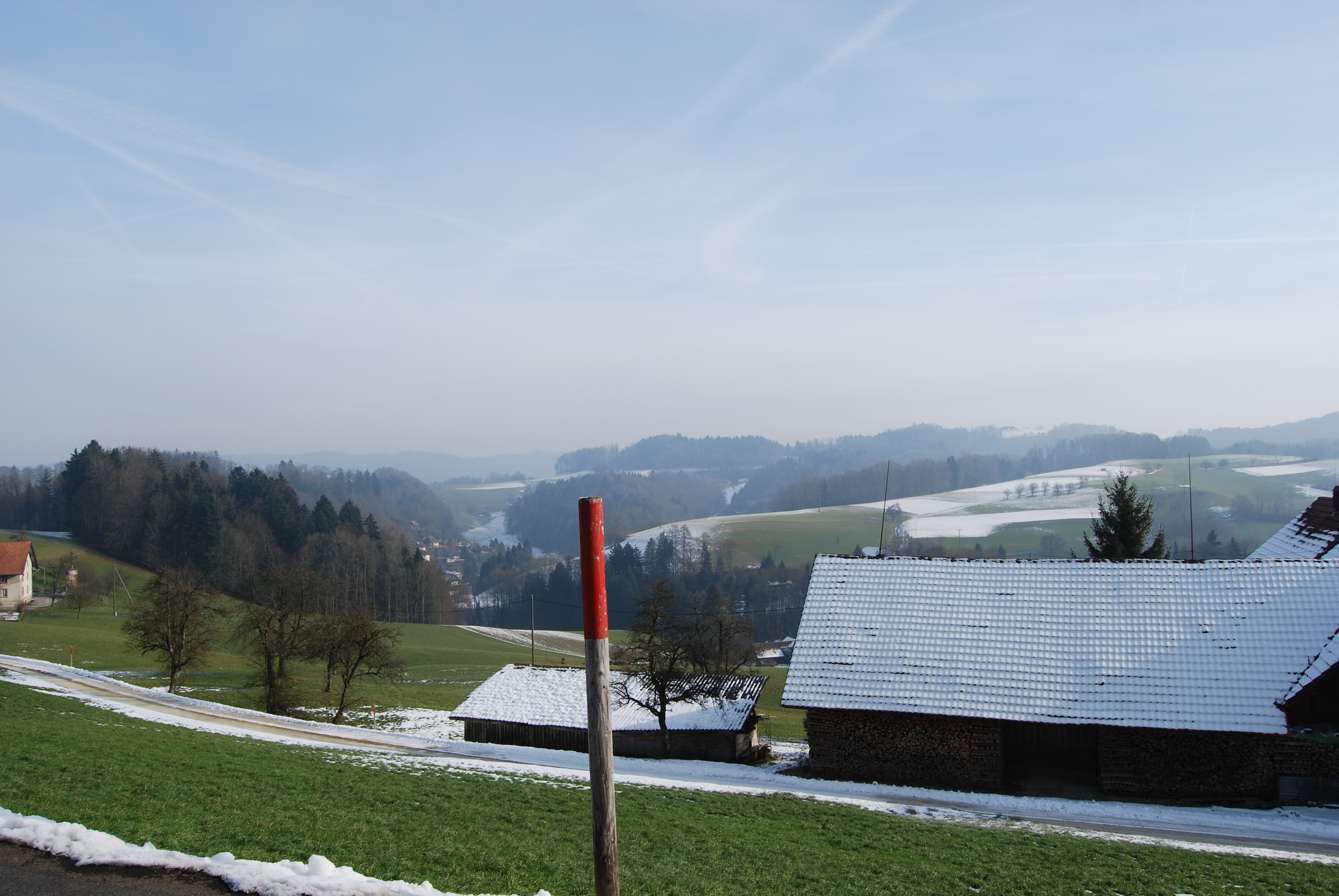
View from Bänkel Pass to Schlossrued

Schlossrued has an area, as of 2009, of 7.22 square kilometers (2.79 sq mi). Of this area, 4.41 square kilometers (1.70 sq mi) or 61.1% is used for agricultural purposes, while 2.26 square kilometers (0.87 sq mi) or 31.3% is forested. Of the rest of the land, 0.57 square kilometers (0.22 sq mi) or 7.9% is settled (buildings or roads), 0.02 km^{2} (4.9 acres) or 0.3% is either rivers or lakes.

Of the built-up area, housing and buildings made up 3.9% and transportation infrastructure made up 3.0%. 28.0% of the total land area is heavily forested and 3.3% is covered with orchards or small clusters of trees. Of the agricultural land, 16.6% is used for growing crops and 41.7% is pastures, while 2.8% is used for orchards or vine crops. All the water in the municipality is in rivers and streams.

== Coat of arms ==
The blazon of the municipal coat of arms is Azure a Tower embattled Argent roofed Gules issuant from Coupeaux Vert and in chief two Oars of the second in Saltire and between them in chief a Mullet of the same

== Demographics ==
Schlossrued has a population (as of December 2020) of 822 As of June 2009, 6.9% of the population are foreign nationals. Over the last 10 years (1997–2007) the population has changed at a rate of -7.1%. Most of the population (as of 2000) speaks German (96.2%), with Serbo-Croatian being second most common ( 0.9%) and Albanian being third ( 0.6%).

The age distribution, as of 2008, in Schlossrued is; 77 children or 8.8% of the population are between 0 and 9 years old and 136 teenagers or 15.6% are between 10 and 19. Of the adult population, 86 people or 9.8% of the population are between 20 and 29 years old. 107 people or 12.2% are between 30 and 39, 159 people or 18.2% are between 40 and 49, and 129 people or 14.8% are between 50 and 59. The senior population distribution is 73 people or 8.4% of the population are between 60 and 69 years old, 75 people or 8.6% are between 70 and 79, there are 31 people or 3.5% are between 80 and 89, and there is 1 person who is 90 or older.

As of 2000, there were 20 homes with 1 or 2 persons in the household, 118 homes with 3 or 4 persons in the household, and 171 homes with 5 or more persons in the household. The average number of people per household was 2.76 individuals. As of 2000, there were 321 private households (homes and apartments) in the municipality, and an average of 2.8 persons per household. In 2008 there were 141 single family homes (or 41.0% of the total) out of a total of 344 homes and apartments. There were a total of 4 empty apartments for a 1.2% vacancy rate. As of 2007, the construction rate of new housing units was 1.2 new units per 1000 residents.

In the 2007 federal election, the most popular party was the SVP, who received 54.9% of the vote. The next three most popular parties were the SP (11.7%), the CSP (8.5%) and the Green Party (7%).

In Schlossrued about 66.9% of the population (between age 25-64) have completed either non-mandatory upper secondary education or additional higher education (either university or a Fachhochschule). Of the school age population (in the 2008/2009 school year), there are 74 students attending primary school, there are 73 students attending secondary school in the municipality.

The historical population is given in the following table:

Historical population
Year	Pop.	±%
1975	842	—
1980	857	+1.8%
1990	894	+4.3%
2000	913	+2.1%

== Economy ==
As of 2007, Schlossrued had an unemployment rate of 1.59%. As of 2005, there were 123 people employed in the primary economic sector and about 46 businesses involved in this sector. 97 people are employed in the secondary sector and there are 7 businesses in this sector. 79 people are employed in the tertiary sector, with 27 businesses in this sector.

In 2000 there were 455 workers who lived in the municipality. Of these, 343 or about 75.4% of the residents worked outside Schlossrued while 88 people commuted into the municipality for work. There were a total of 200 jobs (of at least 6 hours per week) in the municipality. Of the working population, 7.2% used public transportation to get to work, and 51.6% used a private car.

== Religion ==
From the 2000 census, 123 or 13.6% were Roman Catholic, while 661 or 73.2% belonged to the Swiss Reformed Church. Of the rest of the population, there was one individual who belonged to the Christian Catholic faith.
