= Kalami =

Kalami can refer to:

- Kalami language, spoken in Pakistan
- Kalami, Aptera, a village in Chania regional unit, Greece
- Kalami, Deliana, a village in Chania regional unit, Greece
- Kalami, Heraklion, a village in Heraklion regional unit, Greece
- Kalami, Corfu, a village in Corfu, Greece
- Kalami, Laconia, a village in Laconia, Greece
- Kalami, Messenia, a village in Messenia, Greece
- Kalami, Paros, a village in Paros, Greece

== See also ==
- Kalam (disambiguation)
- Kalmi kebab, a type of Indian kebab
