= Triengen =

- Municipality
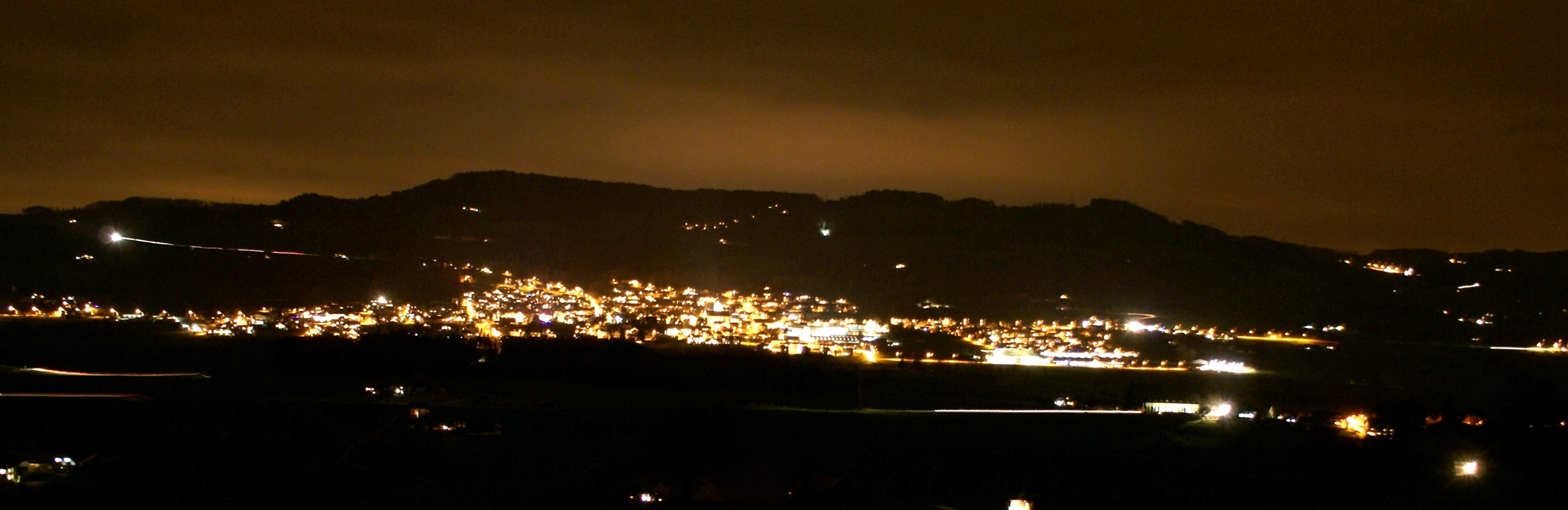

- Coat of arms
- Location of Triengen
- Location within Switzerland Location within Canton of Lucerne
- Coordinates: 47°14′N 8°4′E
- Country: Switzerland
- Canton: Lucerne
- District: Sursee

Area
  - Total: 22.08 km^{2} (8.53 sq mi)
- Elevation: 517 m (1,696 ft)

Population (December 2020)
  - Total: 4,616
  - Density: 209.1/km^{2} (541.5/sq mi)
- Time zone: UTC+01:00 (CET)
  - Summer (DST): UTC+02:00 (CEST)
- Postal code: 6234
- SFOS number: 1104
- ISO 3166 code: CH-LU
- Surrounded by: Büron, Knutwil, Moosleerau (AG), Reitnau (AG), Schlierbach, Schmiedrued (AG), Winikon
- Website: www.triengen.ch

Triengen is a municipality in the district of Sursee in the canton of Lucerne in Switzerland.

On 1 January 2005, Triengen merged with the municipalities of Kulmerau and Wilihof, the new municipality was known as Triengen. Then on 1 January 2009 Triengen and Winikon merged, again keeping the name of Triengen.

== Geography ==
Aerial view (1953)

Before the merger, Triengen had an area of 14.5 km^{2} (5.6 sq mi). Of this area, 65.1% is used for agricultural purposes, while 22.9% is forested. Of the rest of the land, 11.6% is settled (buildings or roads) and the remainder (0.5%) is non-productive (rivers, glaciers or mountains). In the 1997 land survey, 25.09% of the total land area was forested. Of the agricultural land, 59.06% is used for farming or pastures, while 5.57% is used for orchards or vine crops. Of the settled areas, 5.03% is covered with buildings, 0.54% is industrial, 0.72% is classed as special developments, 0.27% is parks or greenbelts and 3.4% is transportation infrastructure. Of the unproductive areas, 0.27% is unproductive flowing water (rivers) and 0.05% is other unproductive land.

The merged municipality has an area of 22.08 km^{2} (8.53 sq mi)

== Demographics ==
Triengen has a population (as of 31 December 2020) of 4,616. As of 2007, 25.1% of the population was made up of foreign nationals. The combined municipality has a population of 4,295 of which 22.0% are foreign. Over the last 10 years the population has grown at a rate of 8.4%, while the merged municipality has grown at a slower 6.2%. Most of the population (as of 2000) speaks German (85.7%), with Albanian being second most common ( 5.0%) and Portuguese being third ( 2.9%).

In the 2007 election the most popular party was the FDP which received 33.4% of the vote. The next three most popular parties were the CVP (27.6%), the SVP (25.4%) and the SPS (6.2%).

The age distribution in Triengen is; 1,167 people or 27% of the population is 0–19 years old. 1,177 people or 27.3% are 20–39 years old, and 1,417 people or 32.8% are 40–64 years old. The senior population distribution is 413 people or 9.6% are 65–79 years old, 112 or 2.6% are 80–89 years old and 32 people or 0.7% of the population are 90+ years old. The merged age distribution is 0–19 years old make up 28.0% of the population, 20–64 years old make up 59.6%, 65–79 years old 9.4% and 80+ years old make up 3.0%.

In Triengen about 60.4% of the population (between age 25–64) have completed either non-mandatory upper secondary education or additional higher education (either university or a Fachhochschule).

As of 2000 there are 1,445 households, of which 350 households (or about 24.2%) contain only a single individual. 229 or about 15.8% are large households, with at least five members. As of 2000 there were 808 inhabited buildings in the municipality, of which 582 were built only as housing, and 226 were mixed use buildings. There were 371 single family homes, 112 double family homes, and 99 multi-family homes in the municipality. Most homes were either two (341) or three (175) story structures. There were only 28 single story buildings and 38 four or more story buildings.

Triengen has an unemployment rate of 2.27%. As of 2005, there were 216 people employed in the primary economic sector and about 69 businesses involved in this sector. 1011 people are employed in the secondary sector and there are 44 businesses in this sector. 701 people are employed in the tertiary sector, with 81 businesses in this sector. As of 2000 51.5% of the population of the municipality were employed in some capacity. At the same time, females made up 41.8% of the workforce.

In the 2000 census the religious membership of Triengen was; 3,035 (72.6%) were Roman Catholic, and 433 (10.4%) were Protestant, with an additional 67 (1.6%) that were of some other Christian faith. There are 2 individuals (0.05% of the population) who are Jewish. There are 324 individuals (7.75% of the population) who are Muslim. Of the rest; there were 12 (0.29%) individuals who belong to another religion (not listed), 141 (3.37%) who do not belong to any organized religion, 166 (3.97%) who did not answer the question.
