= Schlierbach, Switzerland =

Schlierbach
- Municipality
- Coat of arms
- Location of Schlierbach
- Location within Switzerland Location within Canton of Lucerne
- Coordinates: 47°13′N 8°7′E
- Country: Switzerland
- Canton: Lucerne
- District: Sursee

Area
  - Total: 7.23 km^{2} (2.79 sq mi)
- Elevation: 697 m (2,287 ft)

Population (December 2007)
  - Total: 632
  - Density: 87.4/km^{2} (226/sq mi)
- Time zone: UTC+01:00 (CET)
  - Summer (DST): UTC+02:00 (CEST)
- Postal code: 6231
- SFOS number: 1100
- ISO 3166 code: CH-LU
- Surrounded by: Büron, Geuensee, Rickenbach, Schmiedrued (AG), Triengen
- Website: www.schlierbach.ch

Schlierbach is a municipality in the district of Sursee, in the canton of Lucerne, in Switzerland.

== Geography ==
Schlierbach has an area of 7.2 km^{2} (2.8 sq mi). Of this area, 62.5% is used for agricultural purposes, while 31% is forested. The rest of the land, (6.5%) is settled. In the 1997 land survey, 30.98% of the total land area was forested. Of the agricultural land, 57.68% is used for farming or pastures, while 4.84% is used for orchards or vine crops. Of the settled areas, 3.32% is covered with buildings, 0.14% is industrial, 0.41% is classed as special developments, 0.28% is parks or greenbelts and 2.35% is transportation infrastructure.

== Demographics ==
Schlierbach has a population (as of 2007) of 632, of which 7.8% are foreign nationals. Over the last 10 years the population has grown at a rate of 7.7%. Most of the population (as of 2000) speaks German (95.2%), with Albanian being second most common ( 3.0%) and French being third ( 0.5%).

In the 2007 election, the most popular party was the FDP which received 39% of the vote. The next three most popular parties were the CVP (31.3%), the SVP (21%) and the Green Party (4.2%).

The age distribution in Schlierbach is; 163 people or 25.1% of the population is 0–19 years old. 186 people or 28.7% are 20–39 years old, and 208 people or 32% are 40–64 years old. The senior population distribution is 71 people or 10.9% are 65–79 years old, 17 or 2.6% are 80–89 years old and 4 people or 0.6% of the population are 90+ years old.

In Schlierbach about 64.2% of the population (between age 25-64) have completed either non-mandatory upper secondary education or additional higher education (either university or a Fachhochschule).

As of 2000 there are 183 households, of which 34 households (or about 18.6%) contain only a single individual. 34 or about 18.6% are large households, with at least five members. As of 2000, there were 140 inhabited buildings in the municipality, of which 86 were built only as housing, and 54 were mixed use buildings. There were 74 single family homes, 9 double family homes, and 3 multi-family homes in the municipality. Most homes were either two (66) or three (15) story structures. There were only 4 single story buildings and 1 four or more story buildings.

Schlierbach has an unemployment rate of 0.9%. As of 2005, there were 93 people employed in the primary economic sector and about 37 businesses involved in this sector. 14 people are employed in the secondary sector and there are 8 businesses in this sector. 31 people are employed in the tertiary sector, with 9 businesses in this sector. As of 2000 53.4% of the population of the municipality were employed in some capacity. At the same time, females made up 38.3% of the workforce.

In the 2000 census, the religious membership of Schlierbach was; 487 (85.9%) were Roman Catholic, and 25 (4.4%) were Protestant. There are 18 individuals (3.17% of the population) who are Muslim. Of the rest; there were 21 (3.7%) who do not belong to any organized religion, 16 (2.82%) who did not answer the question.
