= Wilihof =

Former municipality, canton of Lucerne

- Former municipality
- Location of Wilihof
- Location within Switzerland Location within Canton of Lucerne
- Coordinates: 47.2261°N 8.0645°E
- Country: Switzerland
- Canton: Lucerne
- District: Sursee
- Municipality: Triengen

Population (2000)
  - Total: 254
- Time zone: UTC+01:00 (CET)
  - Summer (DST): UTC+02:00 (CEST)
- SFOS number: 1105
- ISO 3166 code: CH-LU
- Website: Profile (in German),

Wilihof is a former municipality in the Sursee district of the canton of Lucerne, Switzerland. Since 2005 it has been part of the municipality of Triengen, together with Kulmerau. Until its dissolution it was the smallest municipality in the canton. It lies on the western slope of the Lucerne part of the Suhre valley and comprised the settlements of Wilihöfe, Bad Knutwil, Burst and Dieboldswil.

== History ==
Wilihof is first mentioned in 1429 as Wyl and in 1469 as Wilehof. It was part of the lordship of Büron, which the barons of Aarburg sold to Lucerne in 1455. The place, often called Triengen ennet der Suren (Triengen across the Suhre), remained part of the bailiwick (Vogtei) of Büron until 1798; it was then assigned to the Helvetic district of Sursee and, in 1803, to the district (Amt) of Sursee. Administratively, Wilihof was created as a municipality of its own, separate from Triengen, only in 1842, and it was listed as such in the cantonal organization law only in 1853. Except for Bad Knutwil, which belonged to the parish of Knutwil, it was part of the parish of Triengen.

Its territory belonged to the classic zone of single farmsteads (Einzelhofzone), where there were no common lands and therefore no cooperative associations. In this place, which had a relatively large number of bigger farms, the Tauner (smallholding peasants), who made up less than 70% of the taxpayers, never reached the dominance that was characteristic of the former bailiwick of Büron. Agriculture still shaped Wilihof at the end of the 20th century; in 1996 the primary sector provided 74% of the jobs.

Bad Knutwil, first recorded in 1484, was developed in 1787 by the Mahler family of Lucerne into a modern spa. The spa operated until 1926 and then passed to the youth village Jugenddorf St. Georg (today Jugenddorf Knutwil Bad). This institution for male youths with behavioral problems, which was run by teaching brothers (Schulbrüder) until 1971, leased the springs to Mineralquelle Bad Knutwil AG, the company that sells Knutwiler mineral water, from 1986 until their sale in 2003.

Wilihof had 266 inhabitants in 1850, 192 in 1900, 319 in 1950, 204 in 1980 and 254 in 2000.

== Bibliography ==
- F. Kurmann, Das Luzerner Suhrental im 18. Jahrhundert, 1985
- Adolf Reinle, Das Amt Sursee, 1956, pp. 484–485 (Die Kunstdenkmäler des Kantons Luzern, 4)
