= Kolom-e Bala =

Village in Ilam province, Iran

Kolom-e Bala Persian: كلم بالا
- Village
- Location within Iran Location within Ilam Province
- Coordinates: 33°21′26″N 46°54′43″E
- Country: Iran
- Province: Ilam
- County: Badreh
- District: Central
- Rural District: Kolm

Population (2016)
  - Total: 702
- Time zone: UTC+3:30 (IRST)

Kolom-e Bala (Persian: كلم بالا) (Note: Also romanized as Kalam Bala, Kolm-e Bala, and Kolm-e Bālā; also known as Colmé, Kolm-é ‘Olyā, and Kuln) is a village in, and the capital of, Kolom Rural District of the Central District of Badreh County, Ilam province, Iran.

== Demographics ==
=== Ethnicity ===
The village is populated by Kurds.

=== Population ===
At the time of the 2006 National Census, the village's population was 687 in 138 households, when it was in Dustan Rural District of the former Badreh District of Darreh Shahr County. The following census in 2011 counted 578 people in 152 households. The 2016 census measured the population of the village as 702 people in 186 households, by which time the district had been separated from the county in the establishment of Badreh County. The rural district was transferred to the new Central District, and Kolom-e Bala was transferred to Kolom Rural District created in the district. It was the most populous village in its rural district.
