= Pischelsdorf in der Steiermark =

- Former municipality
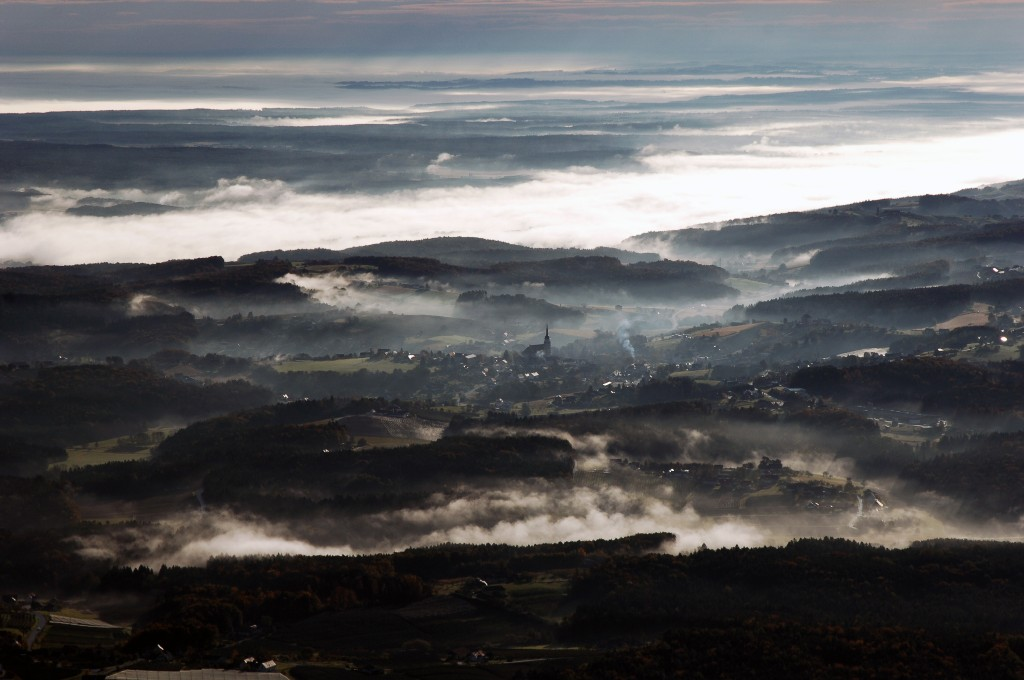

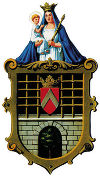
- Coat of arms

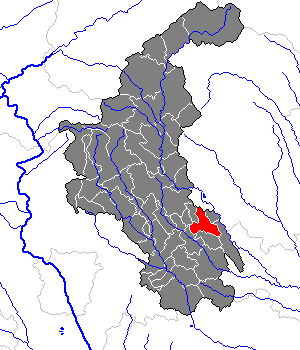
- Location within Weiz district

- Location within Austria
- Coordinates: 47°10′43″N 15°48′26″E
- Country: Austria
- State: Styria
- District: Weiz

Area
  - Total: 17.31 km^{2} (6.68 sq mi)
- Elevation: 378 m (1,240 ft)

Population (1 January 2016)
  - Total: 2,556
  - Density: 147.7/km^{2} (382.4/sq mi)
- Time zone: UTC+1 (CET)
  - Summer (DST): UTC+2 (CEST)
- Postal code: 8212
- Area code: 03113
- Vehicle registration: WZ
- Website: www.pischelsdorf. steiermark.at

Pischelsdorf in der Steiermark is a former municipality in the Styrian Hills, in the district of Weiz in the Austrian state of Styria. Since the 2015 Styria municipal structural reform, it has been part of the municipality Pischelsdorf am Kulm.
