= Culm =

Culm may refer to:

- Culm (in British English), imperfect anthracite, a variety of coal
  - also some carboniferous rock strata known as the Culm Measures
- Culm (in American English), coal refuse or coal waste
- Culm (botany), the stem of a grass or sedge
- River Culm, in Devon, England
- Chełmno, Poland, formerly also known as Culm

== See also ==
- Kulm (disambiguation)
- Culm bank, a coalmine waste or spoil heap, a pitheap or as misnamed 'a slagheap'
- Culm bomb
- Purple moor grass and rush pastures, in Devon and Cornwall known as culm grassland
