= Kirchleerau =

- Municipality
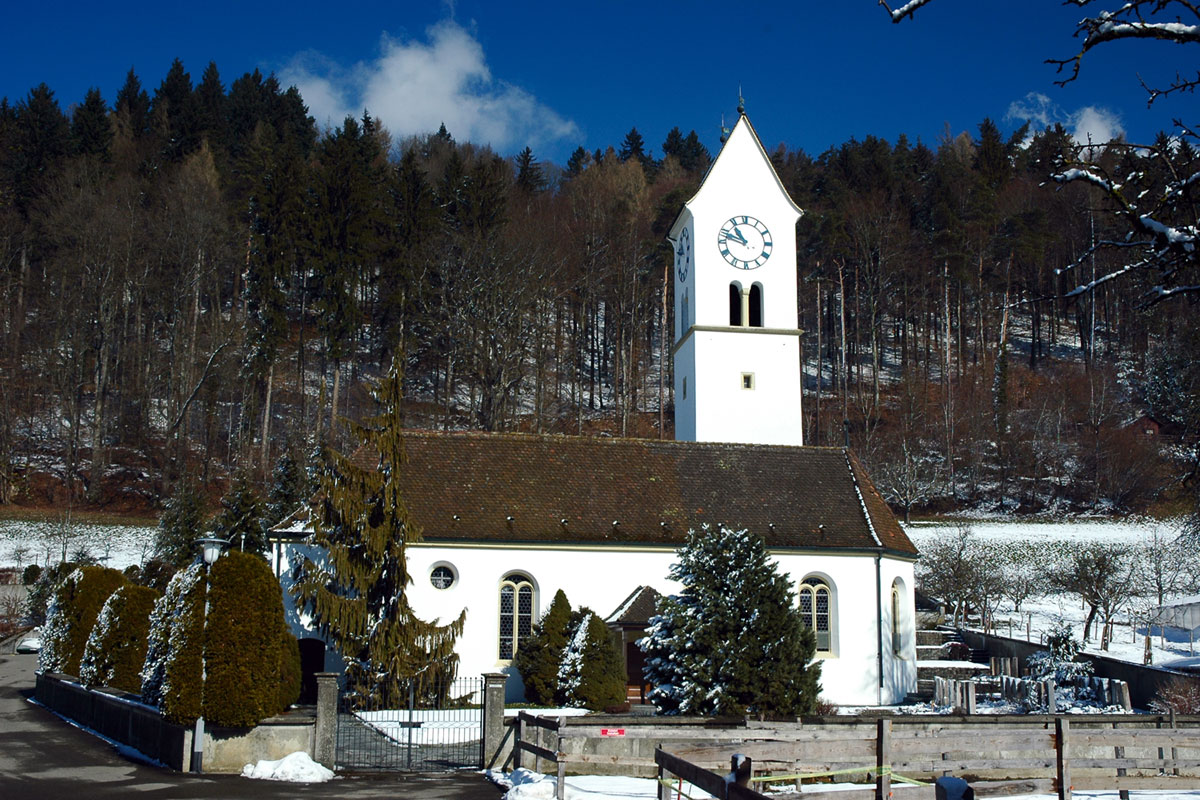
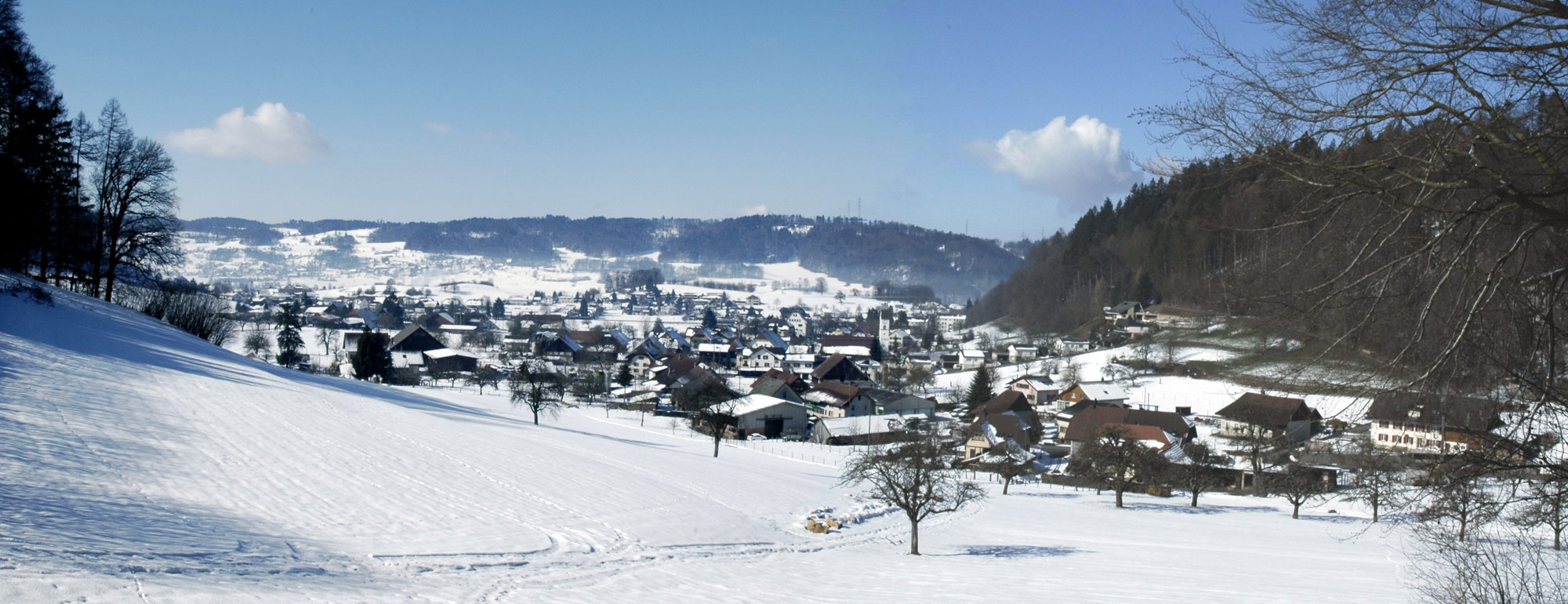
- Kirchleerau village church

- Flag Coat of arms
- Location of Kirchleerau
- Location within Switzerland Location within Canton of Aargau
- Coordinates: 47°17′N 8°4′E
- Country: Switzerland
- Canton: Aargau
- District: Zofingen

Area
  - Total: 4.36 km^{2} (1.68 sq mi)
- Elevation: 512 m (1,680 ft)

Population (2024-12-31)
  - Total: 784
  - Density: 180/km^{2} (466/sq mi)
- Time zone: UTC+01:00 (CET)
  - Summer (DST): UTC+02:00 (CEST)
- Postal code: 5054
- SFOS number: 4275
- ISO 3166 code: CH-AG
- Surrounded by: Moosleerau, Schlossrued, Schmiedrued, Staffelbach
- Website: www.kirchleerau.ch

Kirchleerau is a municipality in the district of Zofingen in the canton of Aargau in Switzerland.

== History ==
Kirchleerau is first mentioned in 1248 as Lerowe. Finds of bricks and wall remains indicate that the area was already inhabited by the Romans. The first documented mention of Lerowe is for the year 1248, the name Kylchleren appeared for the first time in 1306 in the Habsburg Urbar. The name comes from the Old High German lewirouwo, which means "by the land of the graves near the water".[3] In the Middle Ages the village was in the domain of the Counts of Lenzburg, later the Counts of Kyburg. After these had died out, the Habsburgs took over the sovereignty and the blood jurisdiction in 1273.

In 1415 the Confederates conquered Aargau. Kirchleerau now belonged to the subject territory of the city of Bern, the so-called Bernese Aargau. From the 15th century on, the village was part of the Lordship of Rued, a judicial district within the Office of Lenzburg. The owners of the lordship exercised the lower jurisdiction and were the most important landowners. After various noble families from the surrounding area had been in possession of the manor, it was acquired in 1520 by the Lords of May, who originally came from Italy. Their residence was Rued Castle in the neighboring Rued Valley. In 1528 the Bernese introduced the Reformation.

In March 1798, the French invaded Switzerland, deprived the "Gracious Lords" of Bern of their power and proclaimed the Helvetic Republic. Since then Kirchleerau has belonged to the canton of Aargau. It was not until 1834 that the May sold their last remaining rights to the canton. Until well into the 20th century, agriculture shaped the life of the community. Since the beginning of the 1960s, the population has increased by more than half due to increased building activity.

== Geography ==
Aerial view (1953)

Kirchleerau has an area, as of 2009, of 4.36 square kilometers (1.68 sq mi). Of this area, 1.81 km^{2} (0.70 sq mi) or 41.5% is used for agricultural purposes, while 2.18 km^{2} (0.84 sq mi) or 50.0% is forested. Of the rest of the land, 0.37 km^{2} (0.14 sq mi) or 8.5% is settled (buildings or roads).

Of the built up area, housing and buildings made up 4.4% and transportation infrastructure made up 2.5%. Out of the forested land, all of the forested land area is covered with heavy forests. Of the agricultural land, 21.6% is used for growing crops and 18.1% is pastures, while 1.8% is used for orchards or vine crops.

The municipality is located in the Zofingen district, in an eastern side valley to the Suhre river valley (Suhrental).

== Coat of arms ==
The blazon of the municipal coat of arms is Azure a Church Argent windowed and doored Sable and roofed Gules on a Base Vert. The church (German: Kirche) makes this an example of canting.

== Demographics ==
Kirchleerau has a population (as of December 2020) of 898. As of June 2009, 6.4% of the population are foreign nationals. Over the last 10 years (1997–2007) the population has changed at a rate of 1.1%. Most of the population (as of 2000) speaks German (97.3%), with Serbo-Croatian being second most common ( 1.0%) and French being third ( 0.3%).

The age distribution, as of 2008, in Kirchleerau is; 64 children or 8.6% of the population are between 0 and 9 years old and 74 teenagers or 9.9% are between 10 and 19. Of the adult population, 82 people or 11.0% of the population are between 20 and 29 years old. 117 people or 15.7% are between 30 and 39, 130 people or 17.4% are between 40 and 49, and 114 people or 15.3% are between 50 and 59. The senior population distribution is 85 people or 11.4% of the population are between 60 and 69 years old, 49 people or 6.6% are between 70 and 79, there are 28 people or 3.8% who are between 80 and 89, and there are 3 people or 0.4% who are 90 and older.

As of 2000 the average number of residents per living room was 0.5 which is fewer people per room than the cantonal average of 0.57 per room. In this case, a room is defined as space of a housing unit of at least 4 m^{2} (43 sq ft) as normal bedrooms, dining rooms, living rooms, kitchens and habitable cellars and attics. About 63% of the total households were owner occupied, or in other words did not pay rent (though they may have a mortgage or a rent-to-own agreement).

As of 2000, there were 17 homes with 1 or 2 persons in the household, 121 homes with 3 or 4 persons in the household, and 146 homes with 5 or more persons in the household. As of 2000, there were 296 private households (homes and apartments) in the municipality, and an average of 2.3 persons per household. In 2008 there were 163 single family homes (or 51.4% of the total) out of a total of 317 homes and apartments. There were a total of 0 empty apartments for a 0.0% vacancy rate. As of 2007, the construction rate of new housing units was 4 new units per 1000 residents.

In the 2007 federal election the most popular party was the SVP which received 49.07% of the vote. The next three most popular parties were the FDP (12.87%), the SP (12.75%) and the CVP (7.18%). In the federal election, a total of 283 votes were cast, and the voter turnout was 47.9%.

The historical population is given in the following table:

Historical population
Year	Pop.	±%
1764	236	—
1850	688	+191.5%
1900	478	−30.5%
1950	520	+8.8%
1990	660	+26.9%
2000	701	+6.2%

== Economy ==
As of 2007, Kirchleerau had an unemployment rate of 1.61%. As of 2005, there were 67 people employed in the primary economic sector and about 20 businesses involved in this sector. 94 people are employed in the secondary sector and there are 9 businesses in this sector. 442 people are employed in the tertiary sector, with 21 businesses in this sector.

In 2000 there were 414 workers who lived in the municipality. Of these, 313 or about 75.6% of the residents worked outside Kirchleerau while 128 people commuted into the municipality for work. There were a total of 229 jobs (of at least 6 hours per week) in the municipality. Of the working population, 5.9% used public transportation to get to work, and 63.7% used a private car.

== Religion ==
From the 2000 census, 126 or 18.0% were Roman Catholic, while 492 or 70.2% belonged to the Swiss Reformed Church.

== Education ==
The entire Swiss population is generally well educated. In Kirchleerau about 76.8% of the population (between age 25-64) have completed either non-mandatory upper secondary education or additional higher education (either university or a Fachhochschule). Of the school age population (in the 2008/2009 school year), there are 59 students attending primary school in the municipality.
