= Kalam, East Azerbaijan =

Kalam كلم
- Village
- Location within Iran
- Coordinates: 38°45′01″N 46°40′38″E
- Country: Iran
- Province: East Azerbaijan
- County: Varzaqan
- Bakhsh: Central
- Rural District: Bakrabad

Population (2006)
  - Total: 47
- Time zone: UTC+3:30 (IRST)
  - Summer (DST): UTC+4:30 (IRDT)

Kalam (Persian: كلم) is a village in Bakrabad Rural District, in the Central District of Varzaqan County, East Azerbaijan Province, Iran. At the 2006 census, its population was 47, in 10 families.

Kolm (or Kulm) is a village in Badreh District, Ilam Province, Iran.
