= Weiz (surname) =

Weiz is surname of:

- Angelika Weiz (born 1954), German female singer
- Friedrich August Weiz (1739–1815), German physician and Chronist
- Herbert Weiz (1924–2023), German politician
- Waldemar Weiz (born 1949), German musician and graphic artist
- Yosef Weiz (Weitz) (1890–1972), the director of the Land and Afforestation Department of the Jewish National Fund

== See also ==
- Weiz (disambiguation)
