= Badreh =

City in Ilam province, Iran

Badreh Persian: بدره
- City
- Location within Iran Location within Ilam Province
- Coordinates: 33°18′22″N 47°02′14″E
- Country: Iran
- Province: Ilam
- County: Badreh
- District: Central

Population (2016)
  - Total: 4,278
- Time zone: UTC+3:30 (IRST)

Badreh (Persian: بدره) (Note: Also romanized as Badra and Bedre) is a city in the Central District of Badreh County, Ilam province, Iran, serving as capital of both the county and the district.

== Demographics ==
=== Ethnicity ===
Approximately 90 percent of the city natively speaks the Bayray dialect of the Elami subgroup of Southern Kurdish, while the remaining 10 percent speaks Northern Luri.

=== Population ===
At the time of the 2006 National Census, the city's population was 3,775 in 868 households, when it was capital of the former Badreh District of Darreh Shahr County. The following census in 2011 counted 4,249 people in 1,104 households. The 2016 census measured the population of the city as 4,278 people in 1,249 households, by which time the district had been separated from the county in the establishment of Badreh County. Badreh was transferred to the new Central District as the county's capital.
