= Oberkulm =

- Municipality
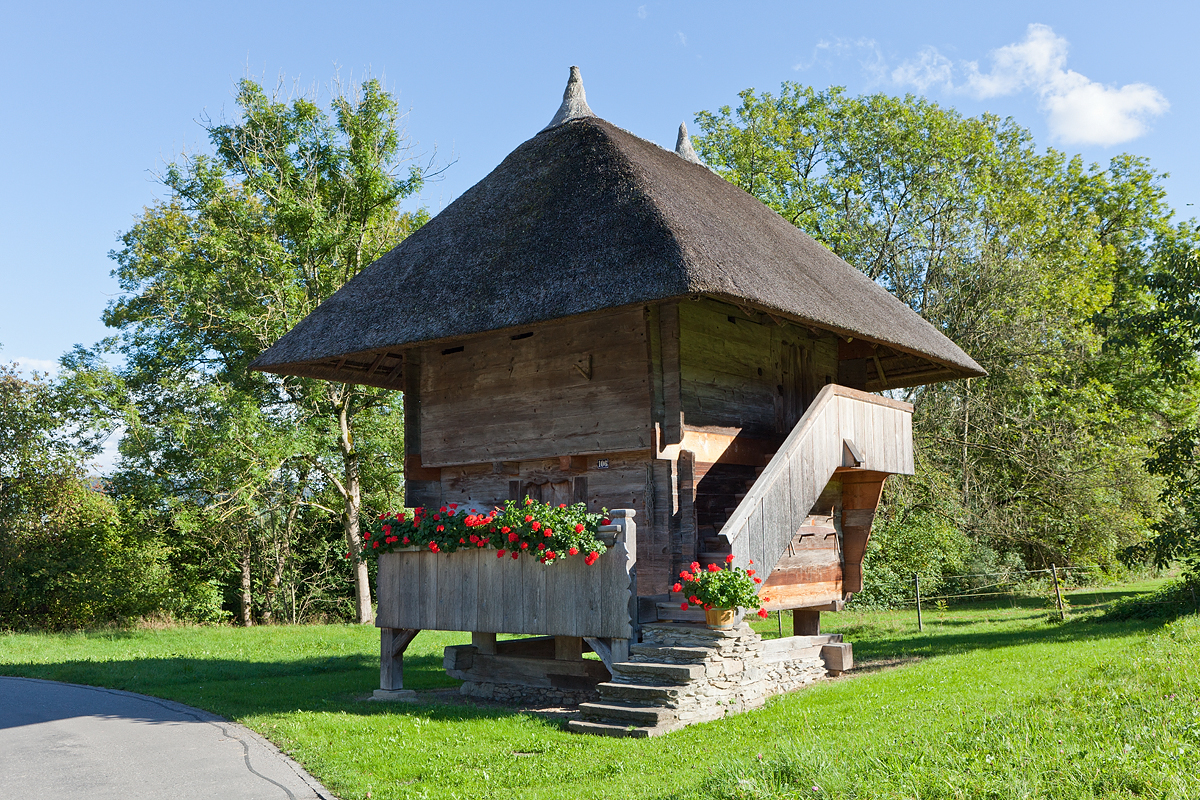

- Flag Coat of arms
- Location of Oberkulm
- Location within Switzerland Location within Canton of Aargau
- Coordinates: 47°18′N 8°7′E
- Country: Switzerland
- Canton: Aargau
- District: Kulm

Government
  - Mayor: Roger Schmid

Area
  - Total: 9.41 km^{2} (3.63 sq mi)
- Elevation: 476 m (1,562 ft)

Population (December 2006)
  - Total: 2,382
  - Density: 253/km^{2} (656/sq mi)
- Time zone: UTC+01:00 (CET)
  - Summer (DST): UTC+02:00 (CEST)
- Postal code: 5727
- SFOS number: 4140
- ISO 3166 code: CH-AG
- Surrounded by: Dürrenäsch, Gontenschwil, Schlossrued, Schmiedrued, Unterkulm, Zetzwil
- Website: www.oberkulm.ch

Oberkulm is a municipality in the district of Kulm, in the canton of Aargau in Switzerland.

== History ==
Aerial view (1965)

Oberkulm is first mentioned in 1045 as Chulenbare, though this is for both Oberkulm and Unterkulm. In 1295 Oberkulm, individually, was mentioned as Obern Chulnbe. The earliest evidence of a settlement is a Celtic gold coin from the 1st century BC. During the Roman era Oberkulm was the site of a Roman estate (villa columbaria, 1756–58 and 1902 excavations) and Alamanni graves, both from the 1st century AD. In the 13th century the village was possessed the Habsburgs, Beromünster Abbey and the Lords of Reinach. From 1415 until 1798 it belonged to Bern as part of the bailiwick of Lenzburg. In 1433 the rights to high justice were purchased from the Austrian county of Lenzburg by the city of Bern. Low justice was, starting in 1306, in the possession of the Herrschaft of Rued, but was sold in 1517 to Bern.

The Protestant Reformation was introduced in 1528. Ecclesiastically Oberkulm has always been part of the parish of Kulm. The parish church is located in Unterkulm.

Towards the middle of the 18th century, small scale cotton spinning and weaving became common in the village. At the beginning of the 21st century, there were various small industrial enterprises. About 60% of the working population, work in the industrial sector while about 26% work in the services sector. A regional retirement home was built in the municipality in 1979.

The American President Herbert Hoover descended from Johann Heinrich Huber (c.1644-c.1706) who lived in Oberkulm before migrating to Ellerstadt in the Palatinate, in present-day southwestern Germany.

== Geography ==
Oberkulm has an area, as of 2009, of 9.41 square kilometers (3.63 sq mi). Of this area, 4.89 square kilometers (1.89 sq mi) or 52.0% is used for agricultural purposes, while 3.4 square kilometers (1.3 sq mi) or 36.1% is forested. Of the rest of the land, 1.1 square kilometers (0.42 sq mi) or 11.7% is settled (buildings or roads), 0.01 km^{2} (2.5 acres) or 0.1% is either rivers or lakes and 0.01 km^{2} (2.5 acres) or 0.1% is unproductive land.

Of the built up area, industrial buildings made up 1.1% of the total area while housing and buildings made up 6.4% and transportation infrastructure made up 3.5%. 33.7% of the total land area is heavily forested and 2.4% is covered with orchards or small clusters of trees. Of the agricultural land, 18.3% is used for growing crops and 30.5% is pastures, while 3.2% is used for orchards or vine crops. All the water in the municipality is in rivers and streams.

The municipality is located in the Kulm district, in the middle Wynental (Wyna river valley). It consists of the village of Oberkulm and a number of scattered small settlements in neighboring side valleys.

== Coat of arms ==
The blazon of the municipal coat of arms is Tierced per pale Sable Argent and Azure.

== Demographics ==
Oberkulm has a population (as of December 2020) of 2,776 As of June 2009, 18.6% of the population are foreign nationals. Over the last 10 years (1997–2007) the population has changed at a rate of 4.5%. Most of the population (as of 2000) speaks German (89.4%), with Turkish being second most common ( 3.6%) and Albanian being third ( 1.6%).

The age distribution, as of 2008, in Oberkulm is; 246 children or 10.4% of the population are between 0 and 9 years old and 348 teenagers or 14.7% are between 10 and 19. Of the adult population, 280 people or 11.8% of the population are between 20 and 29 years old. 302 people or 12.7% are between 30 and 39, 386 people or 16.3% are between 40 and 49, and 331 people or 13.9% are between 50 and 59. The senior population distribution is 221 people or 9.3% of the population are between 60 and 69 years old, 170 people or 7.2% are between 70 and 79, there are 73 people or 3.1% who are between 80 and 89, and there are 17 people or 0.7% who are 90 and older.

As of 2000 the average number of residents per living room was 0.58, which is about equal to the cantonal average of 0.57 per room. In this case, a room is defined as space of a housing unit of at least 4 m^{2} (43 sq ft) as normal bedrooms, dining rooms, living rooms, kitchens and habitable cellars and attics. About 60.1% of the total households were owner occupied, or in other words did not pay rent (though they may have a mortgage or a rent-to-own agreement).

As of 2000, there were 49 homes with 1 or 2 persons in the household, 375 homes with 3 or 4 persons in the household, and 390 homes with 5 or more persons in the household. The average number of people per household was 2.60 individuals. As of 2000, there were 826 private households (homes and apartments) in the municipality, and an average of 2.6 persons per household. In 2008 there were 489 single family homes (or 50.7% of the total) out of a total of 965 homes and apartments. There were a total of 5 empty apartments for a 0.5% vacancy rate. As of 2007, the construction rate of new housing units was 7.6 new units per 1000 residents.

In the 2007 federal election the most popular party was the SVP which received 48.6% of the vote. The next three most popular parties were the SP (13.7%), the FDP (13.2%) and the CVP (5.8%).

In Oberkulm about 69.6% of the population (between age 25-64) have completed either non-mandatory upper secondary education or additional higher education (either university or a Fachhochschule). Of the school age population (in the 2008/2009 school year), there are 201 students attending primary school, there are 79 students attending secondary school in the municipality.

The historical population is given in the following table:

Historical population
Year	Pop.	±%
1653	285	—
1850	1,784	+526.0%
1900	1,331	−25.4%
1920	1,207	−9.3%
1950	1,522	+26.1%
2000	2,252	+48.0%

== Heritage sites of national significance ==
The Kornspeicher (a granary) at Im Obersteg 106 is listed as a Swiss heritage site of national significance.

== Economy ==
As of 2007, Oberkulm had an unemployment rate of 1.67%. As of 2005, there were 108 people employed in the primary economic sector and about 40 businesses involved in this sector. 466 people are employed in the secondary sector and there are 27 businesses in this sector. 202 people are employed in the tertiary sector, with 51 businesses in this sector.

In 2000 there were 1,125 workers who lived in the municipality. Of these, 825 or about 73.3% of the residents worked outside Oberkulm while 426 people commuted into the municipality for work. There were a total of 726 jobs (of at least 6 hours per week) in the municipality. Of the working population, 12.6% used public transportation to get to work, and 51.2% used a private car.

== Religion ==
From the 2000 census, 377 or 16.7% were Roman Catholic, while 1,404 or 62.3% belonged to the Swiss Reformed Church. Of the rest of the population, there was 1 individual who belonged to the Christian Catholic faith.
