= Kolm (surname) =

Kolm is a surname. Notable people with the surname include:

- Anton Kolm (1865–1922), Austrian photographer
- Henry Kolm (1924–2010), American physicist
- Ron Kolm (born 1947), American bookseller
- Serge-Christophe Kolm (born 1932), French economist

== See also ==
- Walter Kolm-Veltée (1910–1999), Austrian film director
