= Kalam TV =

Kalam Tv

- Website type: video sharing
- Available in: Arabic English Urdu
- Owner: Tower Media Middle East
- Website: http://www.kalam.tv
- Registration: Optional (required to upload)

Kalam TV is a social networking website, based primarily on video sharing. Initially launched in February 2008 to meet the needs and the preferences of the people in the Middle East for sharing and creating original videos, it expanded services to Iran and Pakistan in mid-2009. It is a part of Tower Media Middle East located in Dubai Media City.

== Features ==
Videos can be uploaded at Kalam TV by registered users only. The users can create, customize their channels and profile with avatar, background and header images. The website has features like video embedding, downloading, sharing publicly or privately, user-commenting, rating and play lists. Users can make friends, can chat and watch videos in low or high quality.

== Content ==
Video content is categorized into categories like Drama, Film, Poetry, Jokes, Fashion, Sports, Music, Cooking, Talk shows, News Content, Citizen Journalism. The website does not allow any copyrighted material to be shared.

=== Arabic ===
The Arabic section include various TV shows from Al Aan TV including Al Layla Shellatna and go live on web via Kalam TV as soon as they are aired on TV.

=== Persian ===
Kalam Farsi gives voice to Iranian and Persian-speaking community around the world. It is compliant with Iran's Internet regulatory authority, Telecommunication Company of Iran. Kalam Farsi was the first online resource for Iranian President Mahmoud Ahmadinejad's exclusive interview on Al Aan TV

=== Urdu ===
The Urdu section focuses on citizen journalists from Pakistan. It is the only video sharing website for Urdu speakers. Major content comes from ordinary citizen reporters as well as media partners which include Geo Tv, Punjab Tv. A weekly 20 minute infomercial named Kalam Hum Kalam is aired every Saturday on Geo TV.

== Merger ==
As of December 2011, Kalam TV content was completely merged with Al Aan TV.
