= Hendmini District =

District in Ilam province, Iran

Hendmini District Persian: بخش هندمینی
- District
- Location within Iran Location within Ilam Province
- Coordinates: 33°14′44″N 47°07′40″E
- Country: Iran
- Province: Ilam
- County: Badreh
- Capital: Cheshmeh Shirin

Population (2016)
  - Total: 6,906
- Time zone: UTC+3:30 (IRST)

Hendmini District (Persian: بخش هندمینی) is in Badreh County, Ilam province, Iran. Its capital is the city of Cheshmeh Shirin.

== History ==
After the 2011 National Census, Badreh District was separated from Darreh Shahr County in the establishment of Badreh County, which was divided into two districts of two rural districts each, with Badreh as its capital and only city at the time. After the 2016 census, the village of Cheshmeh Shirin was elevated to the status of a city.

== Demographics ==
=== Population ===
At the time of the 2016 census, the district's population was 6,906 inhabitants in 1,825 households.

=== Administrative divisions ===
Hendmini District Population
Administrative Divisions	2016
Hendmini RD	3,348
Zarangush RD	3,558
Cheshmeh Shirin (city) (Note: Became a city after the 2016 census)	
Total	6,906
RD = Rural District
