= Mosque of Khushqadam el-Ahmadi =

Mosque in Cairo, Egypt

The Mosque of Khushqadam el-Ahmadi is on el-Seyufia Street in Cairo and was built in 1366. The building was originally the palace of Emir Tashtimur. The building became a mosque in the late 15th century. In 1498, the eunuch Amir Khushqadam el-Ahmadi was stripped of his wealth and rank and exiled to Sudan, where he died.
