= Ahangaran, Kurdistan =

Ahangaran آهنگران
- Village
- Location within Iran
- Coordinates: 34°48′48″N 46°52′54″E
- Country: Iran
- Province: Kurdistan
- County: Kamyaran
- Bakhsh: Central
- Rural District: Shahu

Population (2006)
  - Total: 271
- Time zone: UTC+3:30 (IRST)
  - Summer (DST): UTC+4:30 (IRDT)

Ahangaran (Persian: آهنگران, also Romanized as Āhangarān) is a village in Shahu Rural District, in the Central District of Kamyaran County, Kurdistan Province, Iran. At the 2006 census, its population was 271, in 67 families. The village is populated by Kurds.
