= Ahangaran, Kerman =

Ahangaran اهنگران
- Village
- Location within Iran
- Coordinates: 28°51′46″N 57°54′57″E
- Country: Iran
- Province: Kerman
- County: Jiroft
- Bakhsh: Jebalbarez
- Rural District: Saghder

Population (2006)
  - Total: 11
- Time zone: UTC+3:30 (IRST)
  - Summer (DST): UTC+4:30 (IRDT)

Ahangaran (Persian: اهنگران, also Romanized as Āhangarān) is a village in Saghder Rural District, Jebalbarez District, Jiroft County, Kerman Province, Iran. At the 2006 census, its population was 11, in 4 families.
