= Ahangaran, Ravansar =

Ahangaran اهنگران
- Village
- Location within Iran
- Coordinates: 34°35′19″N 46°46′47″E
- Country: Iran
- Province: Kermanshah
- County: Ravansar
- Bakhsh: Central
- Rural District: Hasanabad

Population (2006)
  - Total: 100
- Time zone: UTC+3:30 (IRST)
  - Summer (DST): UTC+4:30 (IRDT)

Ahangaran (Persian: اهنگران, also Romanized as Āhangarān; also known as Āsangrān) is a village in Hasanabad Rural District, in the Central District of Ravansar County, Kermanshah Province, Iran. At the 2006 census, its population was 100, in 18 families.
