= Alishervan Rural District =

Rural district in Ilam province, Iran

Alishervan Rural District Persian: دهستان علیشروان
- Rural District
- Location within Iran Location within Ilam Province
- Coordinates: 33°26′30″N 46°44′29″E
- Country: Iran
- Province: Ilam
- County: Badreh
- District: Central
- Capital: Pagal-e Garab

Population (2016)
  - Total: 1,767
- Time zone: UTC+3:30 (IRST)

Alishervan Rural District (Persian: دهستان علیشروان) is in the Central District of Badreh County, Ilam province, Iran. Its capital is the village of Pagal-e Garab.

== History ==
After the 2011 National Census, Mish Khas Rural District was separated from the Central District of Ilam County in the formation of Sivan District. Alishervan Rural District was created in the new district. Badreh District was separated from Darreh Shahr County in the establishment of Badreh County.

== Demographics ==
=== Population ===
At the time of the 2016 census, the rural district's population was 1,767 in 477 households. The most populous of its 12 villages was Pagal-e Garab, with 1,037 people.

In 2023, the rural district was separated from the county to join the Central District of Badreh County.
