= Qalam, Iran =

Qalam قلم
- Village
- Location within Iran
- Coordinates: 27°37′26″N 56°49′03″E
- Country: Iran
- Province: Hormozgan
- County: Bandar Abbas
- Bakhsh: shamil District
- Rural District: Shamil

Population (2006)
  - Total: 135
- Time zone: UTC+3:30 (IRST)
  - Summer (DST): UTC+4:30 (IRDT)

Qalam (Persian: قلم; also known as Kalam) is a village in Poshtkuh-e Shamil in Shamil Rural District, shamil District, Bandar Abbas County, Hormozgan Province, Iran. At the 2006 census, its population was 135, in 36 families.
