= Kulm bei Weiz =

- Former municipality
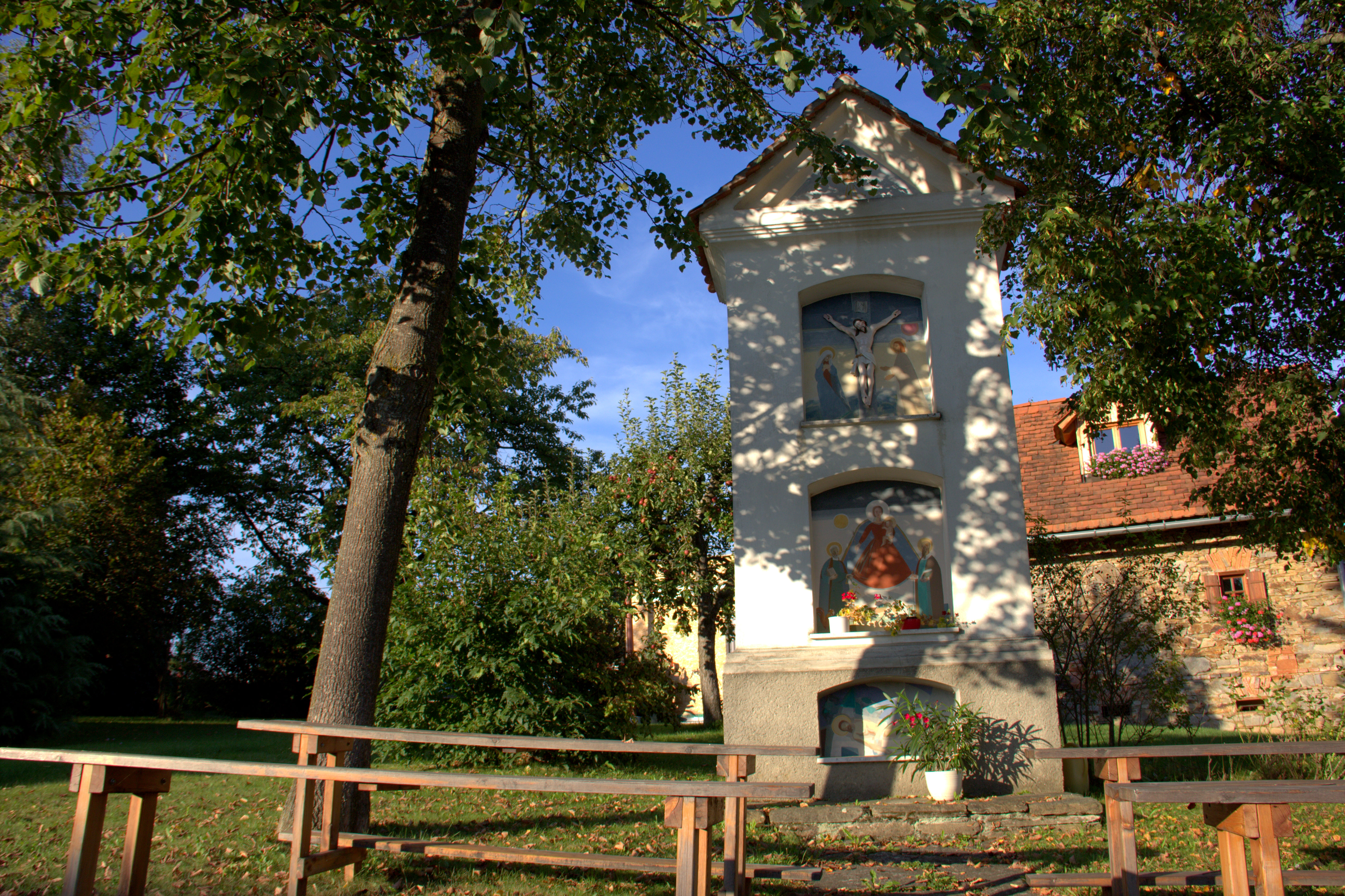
- Shrine in Kulm

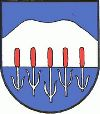
- Coat of arms

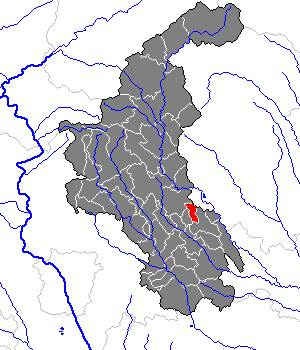
- Location within Weiz district

- Location within Austria
- Coordinates: 47°12′36″N 15°45′00″E
- Country: Austria
- State: Styria
- District: Weiz

Area
  - Total: 5.9 km^{2} (2.3 sq mi)
- Elevation: 497 m (1,631 ft)

Population (1 January 2016)
  - Total: 486
  - Density: 82/km^{2} (210/sq mi)
- Time zone: UTC+1 (CET)
  - Summer (DST): UTC+2 (CEST)
- Postal code: 8182
- Area code: 03113
- Vehicle registration: WZ
- Website: www.kulm-keltendorf.at

Kulm bei Weiz is a former municipality in the district of Weiz in the Austrian state of Styria. Since the 2015 Styria municipal structural reform, it is part of the municipality Pischelsdorf am Kulm.
