= Kolm-e Pain =

Kolm-e Pain كلم پائين
- Village
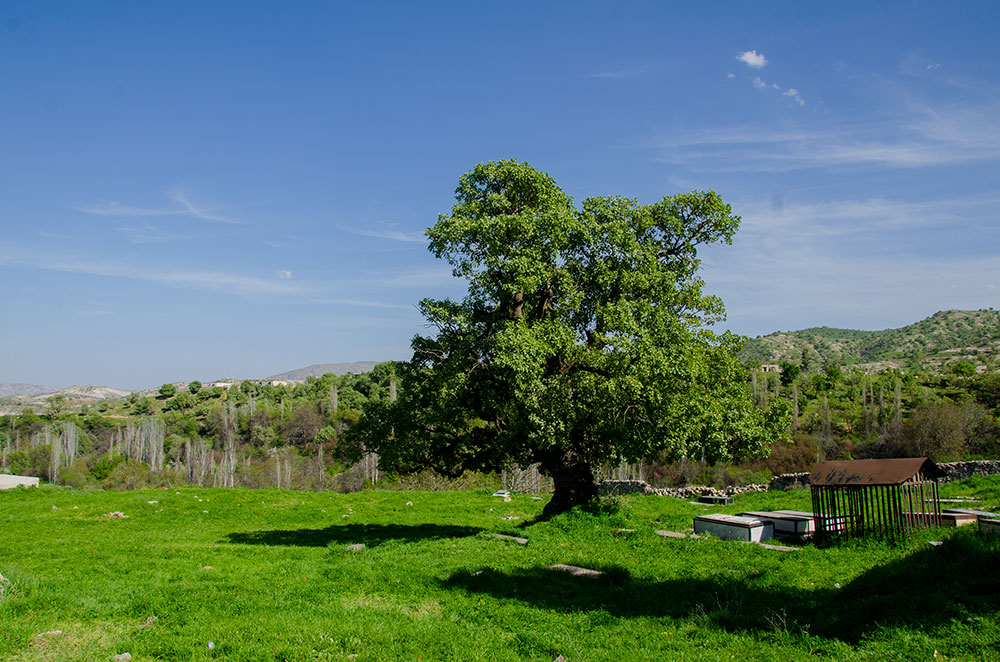

- Location within Iran
- Coordinates: 33°21′30″N 46°55′45″E
- Country: Iran
- Province: Ilam
- County: Darreh Shahr
- Bakhsh: Badreh
- Rural District: Dustan

Population (2006)
  - Total: 95
- Time zone: UTC+3:30 (IRST)
  - Summer (DST): UTC+4:30 (IRDT)

Kolm-e Pain (Persian: كلم پائين, also Romanized as Kolm-e Pā‘īn and Kalam Pa’īn; also known as Kolm-e Soflá, Kūlm, Kūlm-e-Pā’īn, and Kūln) is a village in Dustan Rural District, Badreh District, Darreh Shahr County, Ilam Province, Iran. At the 2006 census, its population was 95, in 17 families. The village is populated by Kurds.
