= Hendmini Rural District =

Rural district in Ilam province, Iran

Hendmini Rural District Persian: دهستان هندميني
- Rural District
- Location within Iran Location within Ilam Province
- Coordinates: 33°16′17″N 47°06′24″E
- Country: Iran
- Province: Ilam
- County: Badreh
- District: Hendmini
- Capital: Abcheshmeh

Population (2016)
  - Total: 3,348
- Time zone: UTC+3:30 (IRST)

Hendmini Rural District (Persian: دهستان هندميني) is in Hendmini District of Badreh County, Ilam province, Iran. Its capital is the village of Abcheshmeh. The previous capital of the rural district was the village of Cheshmeh Shirin, now a city.

== Demographics ==
=== Population ===
At the time of the 2006 National Census, the rural district's population (as a part of the former Badreh District of Darreh Shahr County) was 7,841 in 1,516 households. There were 7,453 inhabitants in 1,805 households at the following census of 2011. The 2016 census measured the population of the rural district as 3,348 in 905 households, by which time the district had been separated from the county in the establishment of Badreh County. The rural district was transferred to the new Hendmini District. The most populous of its 13 villages was Cheshmeh Shirin (now a city), with 1,125 people.
