= Central District (Badreh County) =

District in Ilam province, Iran

Central District (Badreh County) Persian: بخش مرکزی شهرستان بدره
- District
- Location within Iran Location within Ilam Province
- Coordinates: 33°22′50″N 46°52′30″E
- Country: Iran
- Province: Ilam
- County: Badreh
- Capital: Badreh

Population (2016)
  - Total: 8,708
- Time zone: UTC+3:30 (IRST)

The Central District of Badreh County (Persian: بخش مرکزی شهرستان بدره) is in Ilam province, Iran. Its capital is the city of Badreh.

== History ==
After the 2011 National Census, Badreh District was separated from Darreh Shahr County in the establishment of Badreh County, which was divided into two districts of two rural districts each, with Badreh as its capital and only city at the time. After the 2016 census, Alishervan Rural District was separated from Ilam County to join the Central District.

== Demographics ==
=== Population ===
At the time of the 2016 census, the district's population was 8,708 inhabitants in 2,486 households.

=== Administrative divisions ===
Central District (Badreh County) Population
Administrative Divisions	2016
Alishervan RD (Note: Transferred from Ilam County after the 2016 census)	
Dustan RD	3,209
Kolom RD	1,221
Badreh (city)	4,278
Total	8,708
RD = Rural District
