= Dustan Rural District =

Rural district in Ilam province, Iran

Dustan Rural District Persian: دهستان دوستان
- Rural District
- Location within Iran Location within Ilam Province
- Coordinates: 33°18′42″N 47°00′23″E
- Country: Iran
- Province: Ilam
- County: Badreh
- District: Central
- Capital: Shahrak-e Vali-ye Asr Sar Tang-e Bahram Khani

Population (2016)
  - Total: 3,209
- Time zone: UTC+3:30 (IRST)

Dustan Rural District (Persian: دهستان دوستان) is in the Central District of Badreh County, Ilam province, Iran. Its capital is the village of Shahrak-e Vali-ye Asr Sar Tang-e Bahram Khani.

== Demographics ==
=== Population ===
At the time of the 2006 National Census, the rural district's population (as a part of the former Badreh District of Darreh Shahr County) was 4,862 in 998 households. There were 4,394 inhabitants in 1,136 households at the following census of 2011. The 2016 census measured the population of the rural district as 3,209 in 910 households, by which time the district had been separated from the county in the establishment of Badreh County. The rural district was transferred to the new Central District. The most populous of its 15 villages was Shahrak-e Vali-ye Asr Sar Tang-e Bahram Khani, with 1,931 people.
