= Badreh County =

County in Ilam Province, Iran

Badreh County Persian: شهرستان بدره
- County
- Location of Badreh County in Ilam province (center right, purple)

- Location of Ilam Province in Iran
- Coordinates: 33°20′12″N 46°58′16″E
- Country: Iran
- Province: Ilam
- Capital: Badreh
- Districts: Central, Hendmini

Population (2016)
  - Total: 15,614
- Time zone: UTC+3:30 (IRST)

Badreh County (Kurdish:بێری)(Persian: شهرستان بدره) is in Ilam province, Iran. Its capital is the city of Badreh.

== History ==
After the 2011 national census, Badreh became a county..

After the 2016 census, Alishervan Rural District was separated from Ilam County to join Badreh County, and the village of Cheshmeh Shirin was elevated to the status of a city.

== Demographics ==
=== language ===
Badreh linguistic composition
language	percent
Kurdish	80%
Luri	20%

=== Population ===
At the time of the 2016 census, the county's population was 15,614 in 4,311 households.

=== Administrative divisions ===
Badreh County's population and administrative structure are shown in the following table.

Badreh County Population
Administrative Divisions	2016
Central District	8,708
Alishervan RD (Note: Transferred from Ilam County after the 2016 census)	1,767
Dustan RD	3,209
Kolom RD	1,221
Badreh (city)	4,278
Hendmini District	6,906
Hendmini RD	3,348
Zarangush RD	3,558
Cheshmeh Shirin (city) (Note: Became a city after the 2016 census)	1,125
Total	15,614
RD = Rural District

== See also ==
Media related to Badreh County at Wikimedia Commons
