= Badreh District =

Former district in Ilam province, Iran

Badreh District Persian: بخش بدره
- Former District
- Location within Iran Location within Ilam Province
- Coordinates: 33°20′12″N 46°58′16″E
- Country: Iran
- Province: Ilam
- County: Darreh Shahr
- Capital: Badreh

Population (2011)
  - Total: 16,096
- Time zone: UTC+3:30 (IRST)

Badreh District (Persian: بخش بدره) is a former administrative division of Darreh Shahr County, Ilam province, Iran. Its capital was the city of Badreh.

== History ==
After the 2011 National Census, the district was separated from the county in the establishment of Badreh County.

== Demographics ==
=== Population ===
At the time of the 2006 census, the district's population was 16,478 in 3,382 households. The following census in 2011 counted 16,096 people in 4,045 households.

=== Administrative divisions ===
Badreh District Population
Administrative Divisions	2006	2011
Dustan RD	4,862	4,394
Hendmini RD	7,841	7,453
Badreh (city)	3,775	4,249
Total	16,478	16,096
RD = Rural District
