= Iwan Bally =

Swiss industrialist, philanthropist, philatelist and politician (1876-1965)

- Iwan Bally c. 1940

Member of the Council of States (Switzerland)
- In office 7 February 1938 – 5 December 1943
- Preceded by: Hugo Dietschi
- Constituency: Canton of Solothurn

Member of the Cantonal Council of Solothurn
- In office 1921–1933

Personal details
- Born: Iwan Bally; 13 December 1876 Schönenwerd, Switzerland
- Died: 2 August 1965 (aged 88) Schönenwerd, Switzerland
- Party: Free Democratic Party
- Spouse: Clara Rosalie Wissmann (m. 1901; died 1928)
- Relations: Carl Franz Bally (grandfather); Arthur Bally (uncle)
- Children: 4
- Occupation: Industrialist, philatelist, philanthropist, politician

Iwan Bally (13 December 1876 - 2 August 1965) also nicked Mr. Iwan was a Swiss industrialist, philanthropist, philatelist and politician who served on the Council of States (Switzerland) from 1937 to 1943 and on the Cantonal Council of Solothurn from 1921 to 1933. He was a prominent member of the Bally family.

Bally has been involved in the management of the fashion house Bally since 1907. He served as president of the board of directors for several decades.

== Early life and education ==
Bally was born 13 December 1876 in Schönenwerd, Switzerland, the second of four children, to Eduard Bally, industrialist who later served on the National Council, and Marie Bally (née Prior), originally from Meppen in Lower Saxony. His siblings included Maria Helene von Waldkirch (née Bally; born 1875), Ernst Otto Bally (born 1879) and Eduard Bally Jr. (born 1881).

He completed his schooling in Aarau followed by attending the Polytechnic Institute of Zürich (ETH Zurich) and the University of Zürich. After his studies he completed a banking apprenticeship in Paris, France.

== Personal life ==
On 25 September 1901, Bally married Clara Rosalie Wissmann, daughter of Ludwig Wissmann (1845–1920), the owner of a dairy company in Frankfurt am Main, and Emma Wissmann (née Herzog). They were second cousins by their shared great-grandfather Peter Bally. They had four daughters;

- Marguerite Bally (1902–1988), married to Witto Wittstock (1895–1983), no issue
- Liselotte Bally (1905–2002), married to Robert Matter (1904–2001), a textile industrialist from Kölliken (Matter Frères),
- Gertrud Bally (1909–1997), married to Gustav Adolf Frey (1898–1983), three sons and one daughter
- Alice Bally (1911–1993), married to Paul Mathys (1907–1995)

Bally died on 2 August 1965 aged 88.
