= Peter Bally =

Swiss businessman

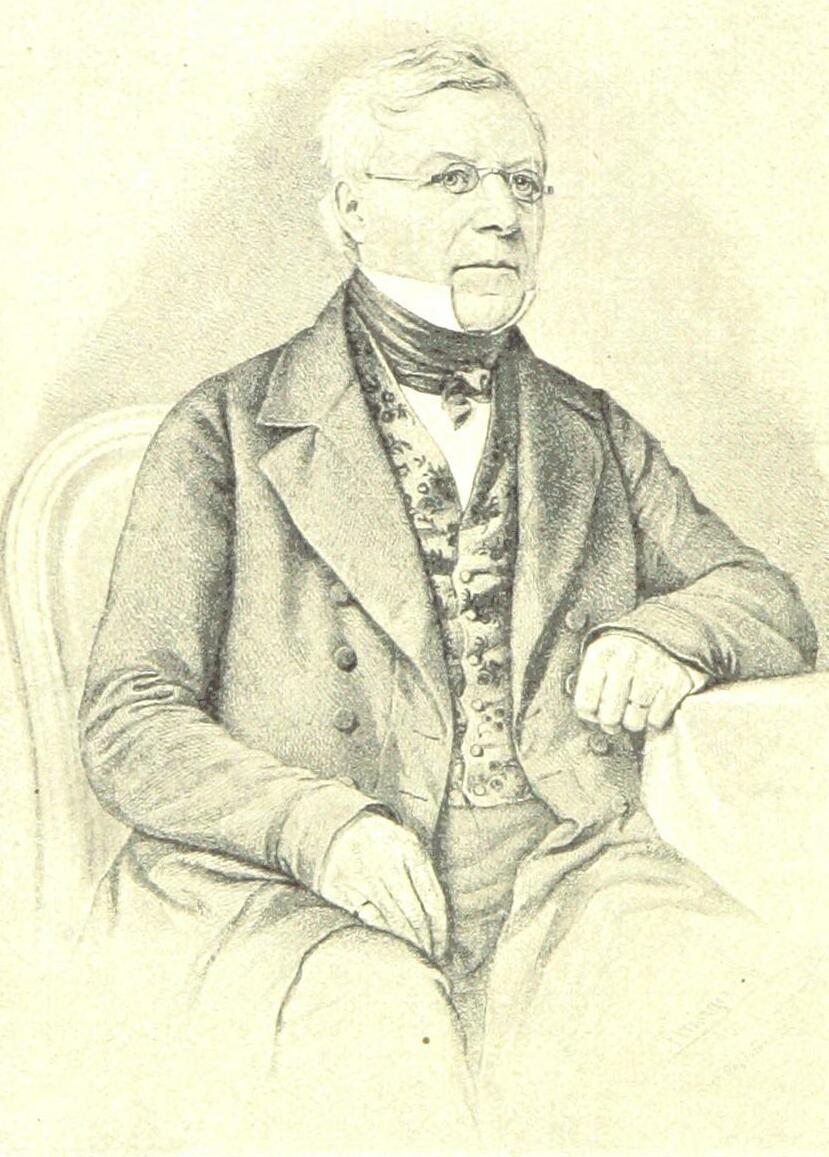

Member of the Grand Council of Solothurn
- In office 1830–1848
- Constituency: Olten District

Personal details
- Born: Urs Peter Bally; 10 February 1783 Schönenwerd, Switzerland
- Died: 23 November 1849 (aged 66) Schönenwerd, Switzerland
- Spouse: Anna Maria Herzog (m. 1807)
- Children: 14, including Carl Franz and Fritz
- Occupation: Businessman, silk ribbon manufacturer, politician

Urs Peter Bally colloquially Peter Bally (10 February 1783 - 23 November 1849) was a Swiss businessman, silk ribbon manufacturer and politician who served on the Grand Council of Solothurn from 1830 to 1848. He was the father of Carl Franz Bally, who founded the Bally (fashion house), in 1851. He is the progenitor of the Bally family.

== Early life and education ==
Bally was born 10 February 1783 in Schönenwerd, Switzerland, one of eleven children, of Franz Ulrich Bally (né Bohli) and Magdalena Kuhn.

His paternal family originally hailed from Übersaxen, Vorarlberg in the Austrian Empire. His father who was born Franz Ulrich Bohli, emigrated to Switzerland in 1778. He was subsequently employed by Johann Rudolph Meyer, an affluent silk ribbon manufacturer, who employed him as peddler.

Bally was raised with eight surviving siblings in the Haus im Holz (lit. house in the woods) in Schönenwerd. He was born an Austrian subject only being naturalized by derivation when his father became a citizen of Rohr, Solothurn in 1787.

== Personal life ==
In 1807, Bally married Anna Maria Herzog (1783–1849), who was the daughter of Urs Peter Herzog and Maria Anna Herzog (née Balli; 1764–1806). She also had Austrian roots and was distantly related to Peter. They had sixteen children;

- Karl Bally (1808–1877)
- Urs Peter Herzog Bally (1809–1855)
- Marie Bally (1810–1892)
- Johann Bally (1812–1889)
- Maria Elisabeth Bally (1813–1823)
- Wilhelm Bally (1814–1814)
- Eduard Bally (1816–1816)
- Eduard Bally (1816–1828)
- Nicolaus Alexander Bally (1817–1872)
- Johannes Theodor Bally (1818–1892)
- Franz Adolph Bally (1820–1853)
- Carl Franz Bally (1821–1899), who founded Bally (fashion house), married Cecile Rychner.
- Fritz Bally (1823–1878), who took over his fathers business (suspenders and shoe elastics) and managed it under new name Bally & Schmitter. He was married to Alice Schmitter, had four children.
- Cécile Albertine Bally (1826–1898)
- Carl Gustav Bally (1827–1913)
- Franz Ulrich Bally

Bally died on 23 November 1849 aged 66. His sons, Carl and Fritz, would take over his business.
