= Paul Matter =

President of the Aargau Chamber of Commerce
- In office 1923–1940

Personal details
- Born: Paul Jakob Matter; 30 January 1868 Kölliken, Switzerland
- Died: 26 September 1950 (aged 82) Kölliken, Switzerland
- Relations: Bally family
- Education: Zurich Polytechnic; University of Lausanne
- Occupation: Businessman, textile manufacturer

Paul Jakob Matter colloquially Paul Matter-Bally (30 January 1868 – 26 September 1950) was a Swiss businessman. He was a member of the Bally family by marriage.

== Early life and education ==
Matter was born 30 January 1868 in Kölliken, Switzerland, to Jakob Matter (1840–1921), a textile manufacturer and politician who served on the Grand Council of Aargau, and Bertha Matter (née Hüssy), into an affluent Protestant family.

The Matter family was an industrial dynasty producing hosiery since the late 18th century. His father was a pioneer of the industry who brought glazed yarn production techniques from abroad, notably France and England, to Switzerland. This brought the family significant success. His maternal family hailed from Safenwil and were also textile manufacturers.

From 1879, Matter and his brothers, were raised at Villa Clara, which was commissioned by his father. After attending the local schools and high school, he studied chemical engineering at Zurich Polytechnic. He additionally completed commercial studies at University of Lausanne as well as educational stays in Frankfurt-Höchst, Silesia and Barmen.

== Career ==
In 1893, Matter entered the family business, initially as an associate until 1906. Then he took over the firm together with his brothers from his father. Since 1902, Matter served as an executive member of the Aargau Chamber of Commerce, and from 1923 to 1940, he served as president. He also served on the board of directors of the Swiss Employers Association, the Swiss Chamber of Commerce and Industry and Union Bank of Switzerland. He was also a board member of Bally and some other private companies.

== Personal life ==
In 1900, Matter married Alice Emilie Cécile Bally (1877–1947), a daughter of Arthur Bally and member of the Bally family of Schönenwerd. They had five children;

- Alice Matter (1901–1997), married to Fritz W. Streuli (1899–1993, an executive at Bally, five children. Her daughter, Lilian Streuli, was married to Roman Abegg.
- Ruth Matter (1904–1995), never married and without issue.
- Max A. Matter (1907–1978), married to Margrit "Maggie" Tobler (1910–1971), four children.
- Edith Matter (1909–1997)
- Hans-Georg Matter (1916–2007)

Matter died 26 September 1950 in Kölliken, Switzerland aged 82.
