= Arthur Bally =

Swiss entrepreneur (1849–1912)

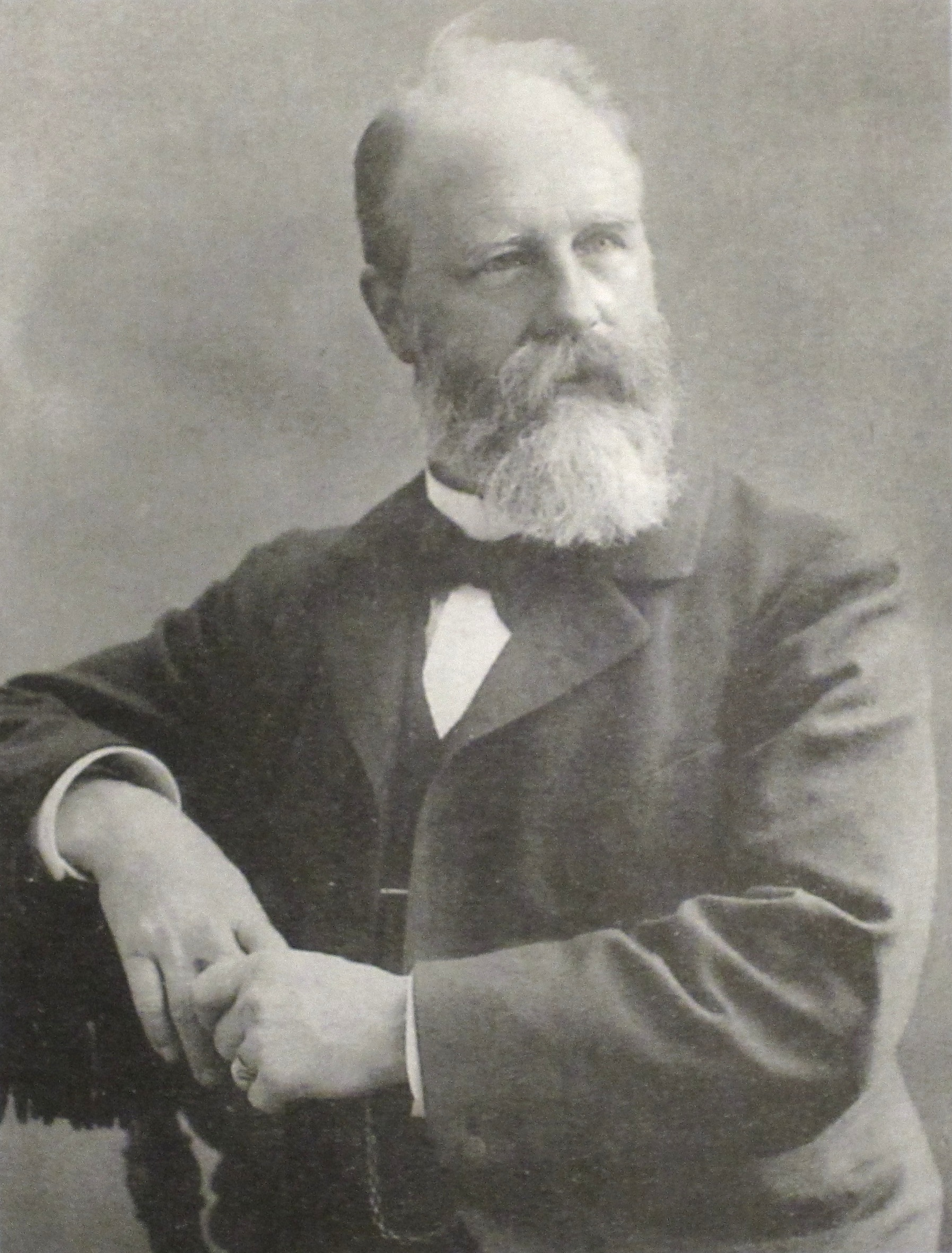

Member of the Cantonal Council of Solothurn
- In office 1886 – 31 December 1912
- Constituency: Olten District

Personal details
- Born: Arthur Bally; 16 December 1849 Schönenwerd, Switzerland
- Died: 31 December 1912 (aged 63) Schönenwerd, Switzerland
- Spouse: Julie Herzog (m. 1874)
- Relations: Eduard Bally (brother)
- Children: 4, including Max
- Parent: Carl Franz Bally (father)
- Occupation: Businessman, industrialist, politician

Arthur Bally (16 December 1849 - 31 December 1912) was a Swiss businessman, industrialist and politician who served on the Cantonal Council of Solothurn for the Liberal-Progressive party from 1886 to 1912.

In 1892, he took-over the family business, Bally, together with his brother Eduard Bally. Bally was the younger son of Carl Franz Bally and his wife Cécile Bally (née Rychner) of Schönenwerd.

== Personal life ==
In 1874, Bally married Julie Herzog (1852–1934), a daughter of Carl Johann 'Hans' Herzog and Emilie Herzog (née von Alberti). Her maternal grandfather was Friedrich August von Alberti, a German geologist. They had four children:

- Hans Arthur Bally (1875–1903), remained unmarried
- Alice Emilie Cecile Bally (1877–1947), married textile manufacturer Paul Matter (1868–1950) of Kölliken.
- Julia Bally (1878–1952), married textile manufacturer Alfred Hüssy (1872–1964) of Safenwil.
- Max Bally (1880–1976), married Anna Helena Hünerwadel (1880–1965) of Lenzburg.

Bally died 31 December 1912 aged 63 in Schönenwerd.
