= Boris Bally =

American artist

- Born: Boris Bally; January 22, 1961 (age 65); Chicago, Illinois, U.S.
- Education: Carlynton High School
- Alma mater: Tyler School of Art; Carnegie Mellon University (BFA)
- Occupation: Artist
- Children: 2
- Family: Bally family Zollikofer von Altenklingen family

Boris Bally (born January 22, 1961) is a Swiss-American artist and metalworker based in Providence, Rhode Island. He is a member of the Bally family.

== Early life and education ==
Bally was born January 22, 1961 in Chicago, Illinois, the older of two sons, to Alexander "Alex" Bally (born 1938) and Doris Bally (née Egger), who both hailed from Switzerland. In 1959, they emigrated to Chicago, where Alex attended the Illinois Institute of Technology and Doris took classes from L. Brent Kington at the Southern Illinois University. He has a younger brother; Nico Bally.

He is primarily of Swiss, Austrian and German descent. Through his father, he is a member of the Bally family, who was primarily of Austrian descent from the Montafon Valley, but had been settled in Schönenwerd, Switzerland since the 18th century. His paternal grandparents were Gustav Bally (1893–1966), a noted psychotherapist, and Johanna Bally (née Zollikofer von Altenklingen), who hailed from Altenklingen Castle.

His parents relocated from Chicago to Corning, New York, where his father found employment as an industrial designer, before ultimately moving to Pittsburgh, Pennsylvania. During his teens, Bally's interest in the metal arts began at age 13 through a class at the Pittsburgh Center for the Arts, taught by Steve Korpa, where he learned to make jewelry and later brass knuckles and throwing stars. His interest in the crafts continued to grow as he experienced the industry through more classes and meeting and working for local jewelers and artists including Jeff Whisner and Ronald McNeish.

He continued taking classes at the Pittsburgh Center for the Arts, won a scholarship for the 1977 Pennsylvania Governor's School for the Arts. In 1979, he graduated early from Carlynton High School, and returned to Switzerland apprentice at the atelier of goldsmith Alexander Schaffner in Basel. He then returned to the U.S. and attended the Tyler School of Art, and transferred to Carnegie Mellon University where he received his BFA.

== Career ==
Through his travels and apprenticeships, Bally showed an interest in the more extreme and mechanical aspect of art and design especially in radical new approaches to material use.

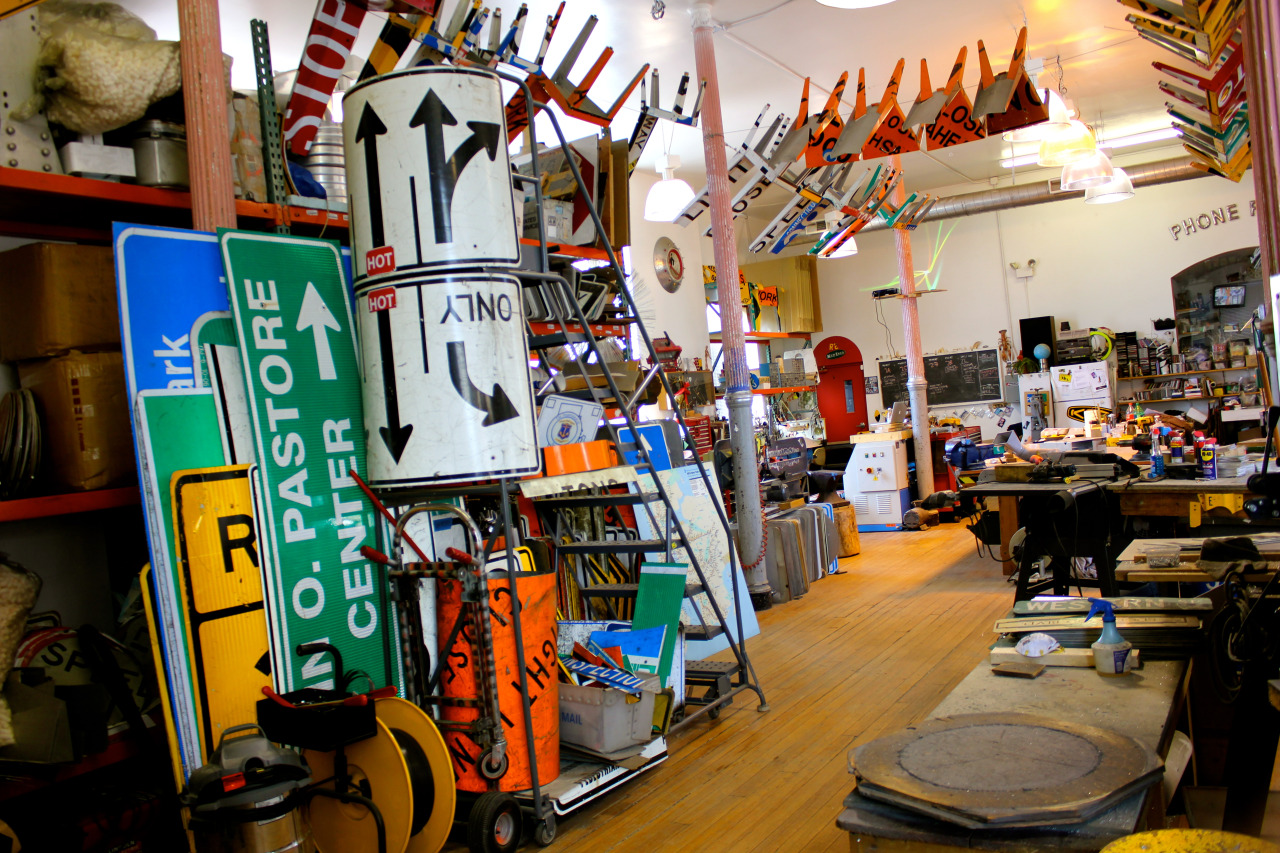
Photo of the interior of the Ryan Post building in Providence, RI. The first floor is Boris Bally's sculpture studio.

Initially, Bally focused on jewellery and flatware to establish himself as a designer and artist. Continuing his interest, he expanded into scrap objects and road signs.

In 1994 he met Lynn E Taylor who was attending Pitt medical school and in 1997 they were married and moved to Providence. RI where she became an intern and resident at the Brown Medical School. In 1998, Bally purchased the Ryan Post building on the Olneyville and Mount Pleasant town line. In the following years, he rehabilitated it to become their home and his studio.

== Permanent collections ==
- Victoria & Albert Museum, London
- London Brooklyn Museum, New York
- Museum of Art & Design, New York
- Carnegie Museum of Art, Pittsburgh
- Museum of Fine Arts, Boston
- Los Angeles County Museum of Art, CA
- Cooper-Hewitt National Design Museum, New York
- New York Racine Art Museum, WI
- National Museum of American Art/ Renwick, Washington DC
- Washington Mint Museum of Craft & Design, Charlotte
- Yale Univ Art Gallery Furniture Collection, New Haven
- Indiana Univ Art Museum, Bloomington
- Rhode Island School of Design Museum, Providence
- Fuller Craft Museum, Brockton
- Tacoma Art Museum, WA
- Saint Louis Museum of Art, MO
- Museum für Gestaltung Zürich, Design Collection
- Center for Art in Wood, Philadelphia

== Teaching ==
- University of Akron, Metalsmithing II, Adjunct Jewelry Instructor 1995
- Pittsburgh Center for the Arts, Jewelry Instructor, lecturer 1990–1995
- Carnegie Mellon University, Artist/Lecturer, Department of Art, 1993
- Carnegie Mellon University, Adjunct Assistant Professor of Design, 1989–1991

== Education ==
- Carnegie Mellon University, Pittsburgh, Pennsylvania, Prof: Carol Kumata BFA: Metals 1984
- Tyler School of Art, Foundation and Metals Program, Philadelphia, Pennsylvania 1980–1982
- Intensive Goldsmith Apprenticeship, Alexander Schaffner Goldschmied, Basel, Switzerland 1979–1980

== Solo exhibitions ==
- De-Sign: Boris Bally's Exploration of the Available. Kendall College of Art, Sarah Joseph, Grand Rapids, December 15, 2003- Feb 20, 2004
- Urban Enamels: Soul-Stirring Works by Boris Bally. Patina Gallery, Santa Fe, New Mexico, December 14, 2001 – January 13, 2002.
- Introducing Boris Bally, Contemporary Metal Artist. Obsidian Gallery, Tucson, Arizona. June 1–30, 1999.
- American Metalanguage I. main foyer, Barbican Centre, London, England. April 10-June 7, 1998.
- Signage: A Solo Show, Gallery I/O, New Orleans, Louisiana. October 1–31, 1996.
- Constructed Metal Objects. Joanne Rapp Gallery, Scottsdale, Arizona. April 1–3, 1996.
- Structure/Geometry. Nancy Sachs Gallery, St. Louis, Missouri March 8-April 13, 1996.
- Bally/Darway. The Works Gallery, Philadelphia, Pennsylvania. October 1-November 15, 1995.
