= Bally family =

- Swiss business family
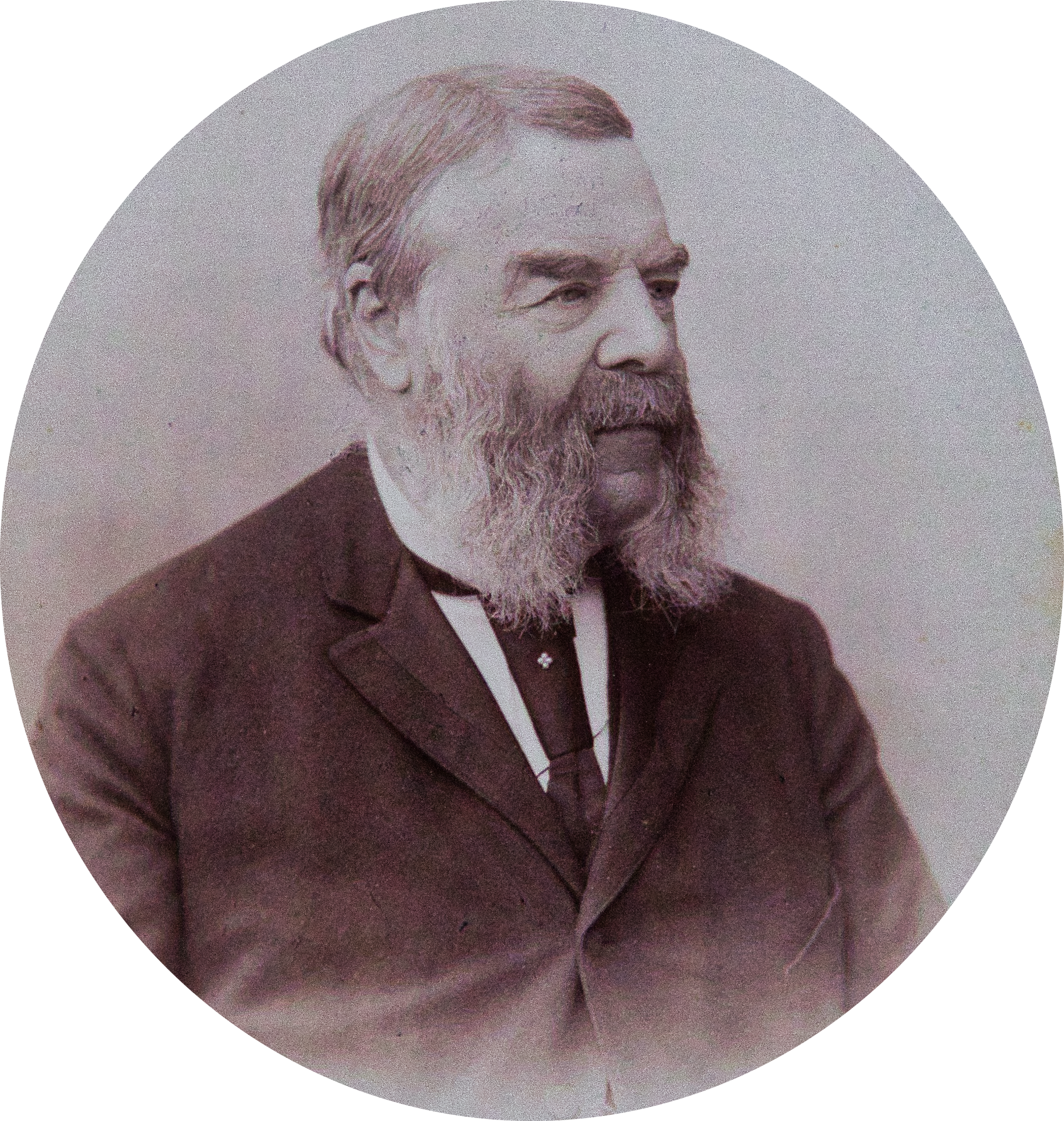
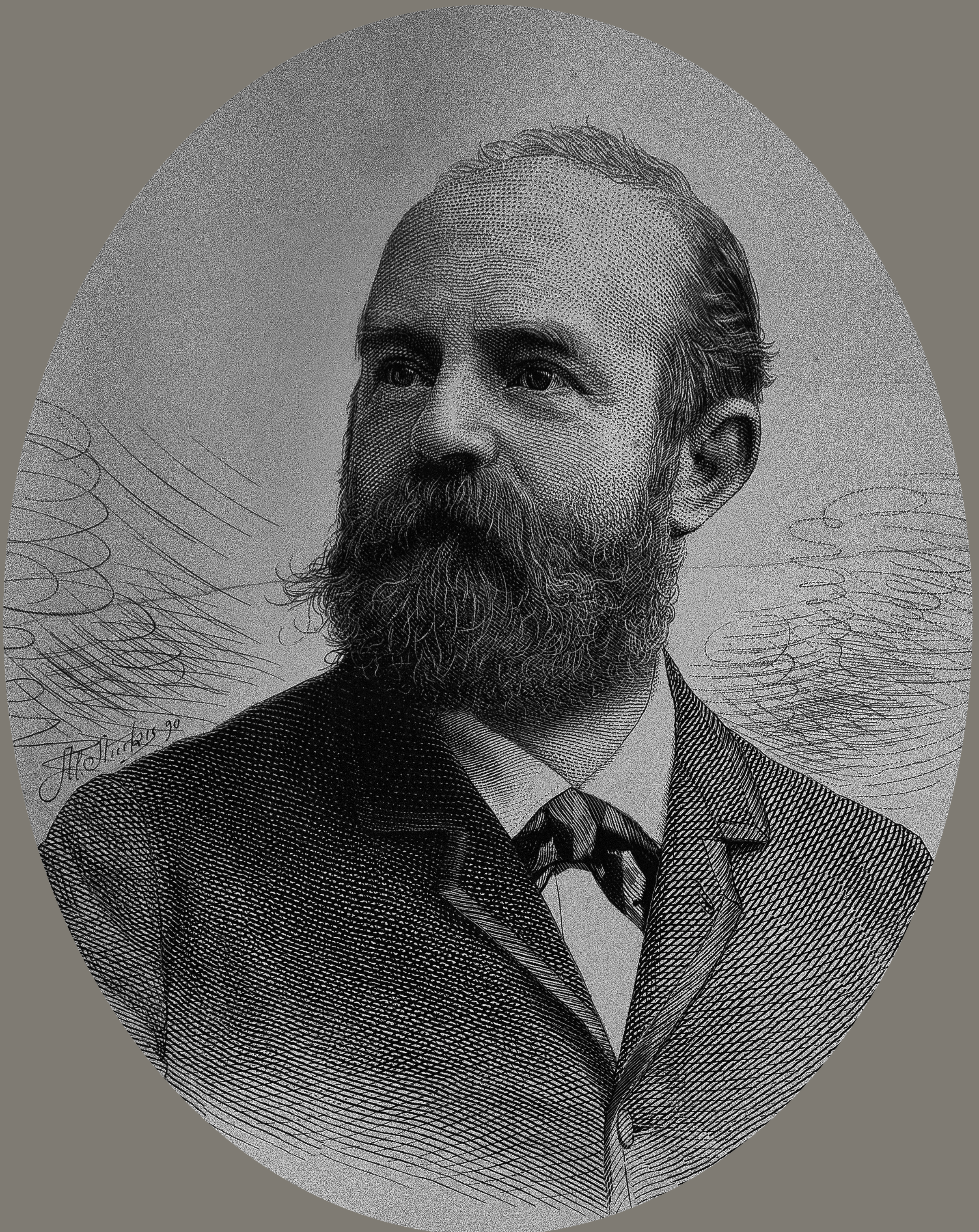
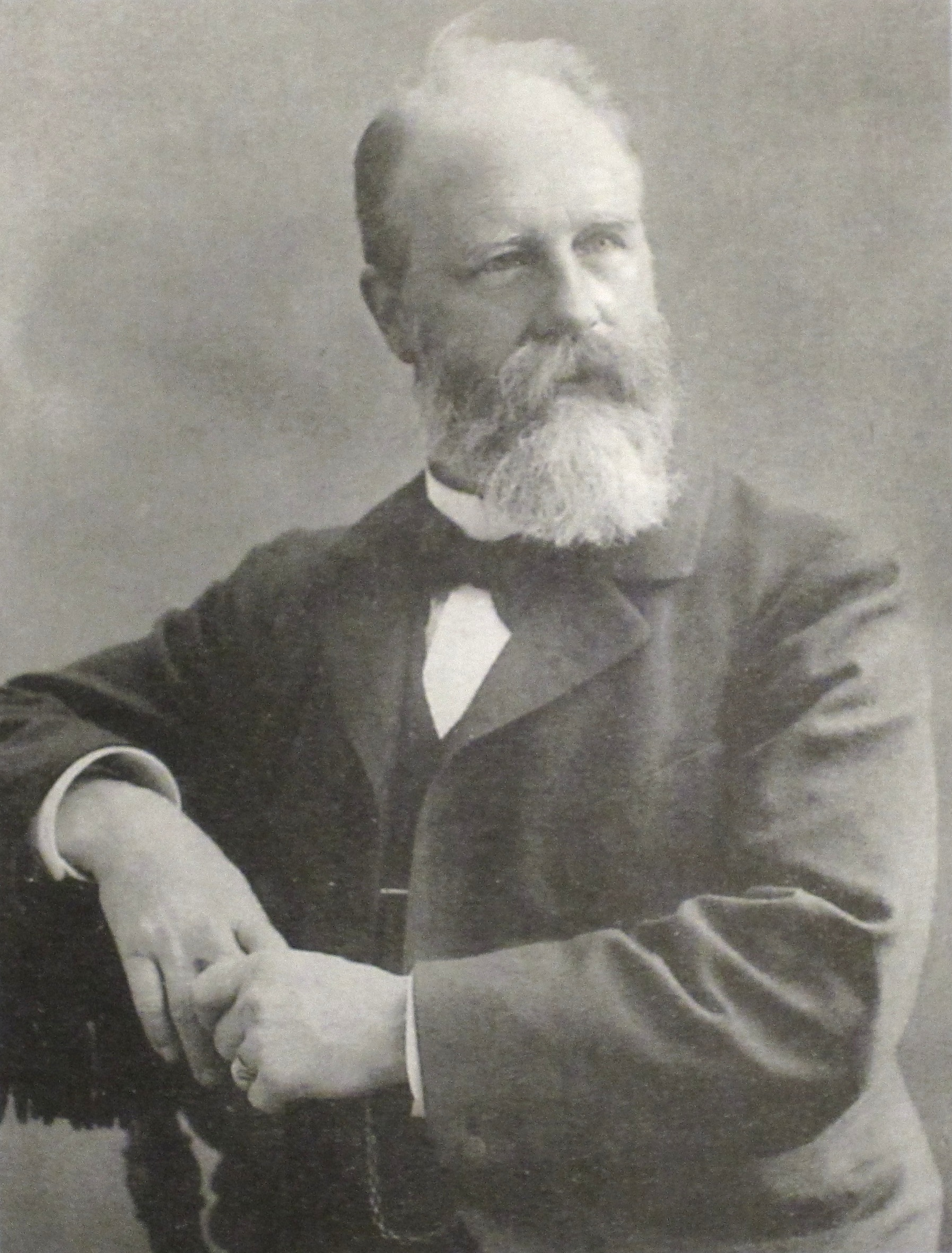
- Carl Franz Bally Eduard Bally Arthur Bally
- Current region: Switzerland
- Origin: Montafon, Austria
- Founded: Arrival in Switzerland 1778, Aarau; 248 years ago
- Founder: Franz Ulrich Bohli (1748–1810)
- Titles: List: Cantonal Councilor; National Councilor

The Bally family (German: [ˈbɑːli]) is a Swiss industrial and political family primarily associated with the Bally (fashion house), once Europe's largest shoe manufacturing company, founded in 1851. The family originally hailed from the Montafon valley in Vorarlberg, Austria.

The progenitor of the Swiss family is Franz Ulrich Bohli (1748–1810), a stonemason originally from Übersaxen, who landed in Aarau in spring 1778. He would later become a merchant and become a Swiss citizen in Rohr, Solothurn in 1788. The family has been strongly associated with the textile industry and the municipality of Schönenwerd.
