= Carl Franz Bally =

Swiss businessman (1821–1899)

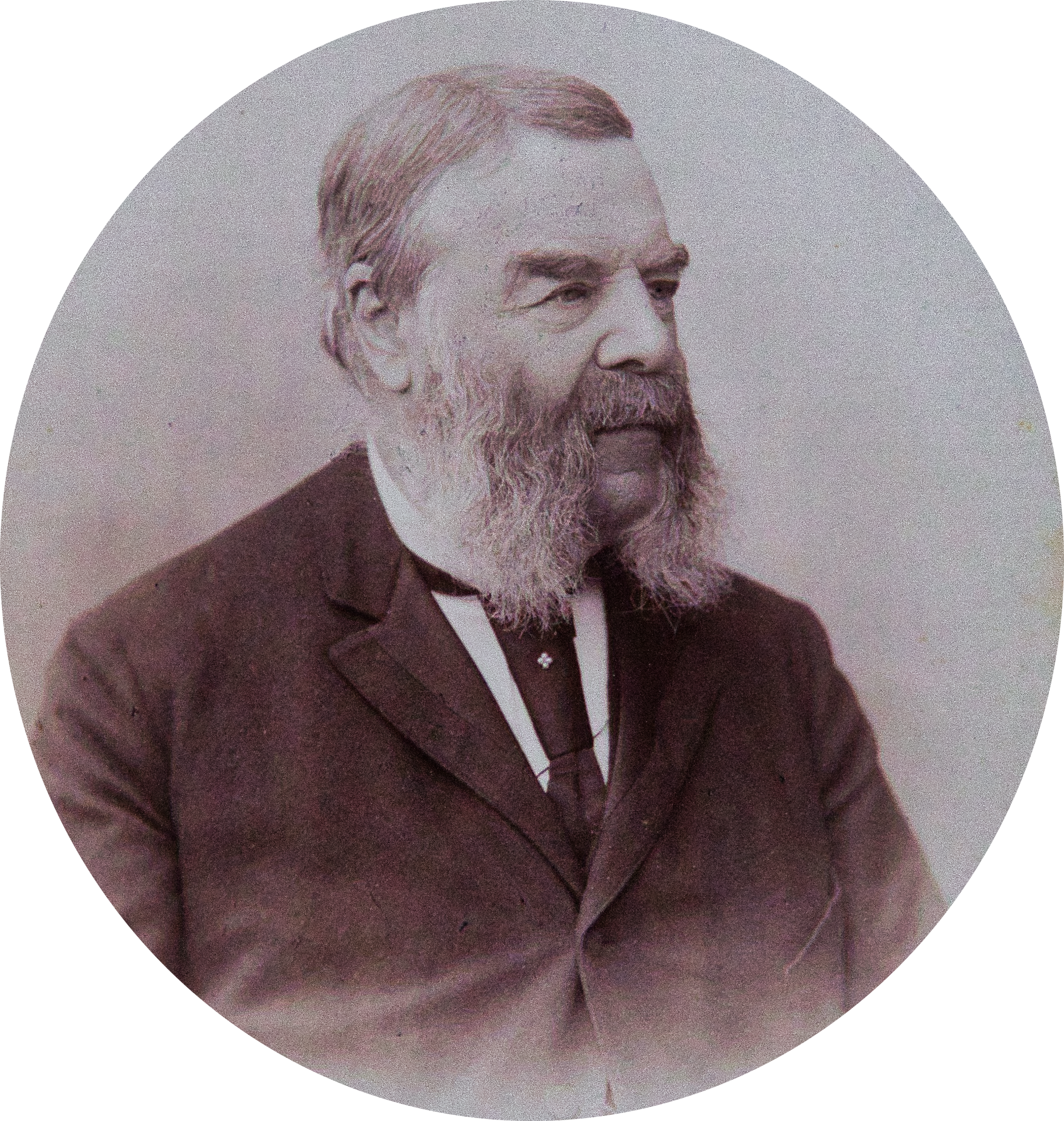
- Bally, c. 1885

Member of the National Council (Switzerland)
- In office 6 December 1875 – 1 December 1878
- Constituency: Canton of Solothurn

Member of the Cantonal Council of Solothurn
- In office 1861–1886

Personal details
- Born: Carl Franz Bally; 24 October 1821 Schönenwerd, Switzerland
- Died: 5 August 1899 (aged 77) Basel, Switzerland
- Party: Liberal-Progressive Party
- Spouse: Cécile Rychner (m. 1846; died 1893)
- Children: Eduard; Arthur
- Parent: Peter Bally (father)
- Education: Old Cantonal School Aarau
- Occupation: Businessman, industrialist, politician

Carl Franz Bally also known by his initials C. F. Bally (24 October 1821 – 5 August 1899) was a Swiss businessman, industrialist and politician who served on the National Council (Switzerland) from 1875 to 1878 and concurrently on the Cantonal Council of Solothurn from 1861 to 1886. In 1851, Bally founded the Bally (fashion house), in Schönenwerd. He has been the patriarch of the Bally family and was involved in a variety of economic and socio-economic organizations throughout his life.

== Early life and education ==
Carl Franz Bally was born 24 October 1821 in Schönenwerd, Switzerland, the eleventh of fourteen children, to Peter Bally (1783–1849), a silk ribbon manufacturer, and Anna Maria Bally (née Herzog).

His paternal grandfather, Franz Ulrich Bohli (1748–1810), emigrated from Voralberg, Austrian Empire to Schönenwerd working as a mason for a manufacturer of silk ribbons. Later, he established his own silk ribbon manufacture in that town, relying mostly on work outsourced to local weavers.

Bally graduated from the Old Cantonal School Aarau and then went to study French in Nyon in the Romandy region. He would ultimately enter his fathers company aged 16 in 1837.

== Career ==
Carl Franz, one of the ten sons of Peter, entered the business at age 17 concentrating on the newest products. During a business trip to Paris he visited a shoe manufacturing plant and began to think about producing shoes, founding his own small facility in 1851.

After initial difficulties the business began to flourish and in the early 1870s he established sales organizations in Buenos Aires (Argentina), Montevideo, (Uruguay) and Paris, (France). To fill the need for workers he opened small manufacturing facilities in several towns in the surrounding region.

By 1880 Bally had transformed Schönenwerd from a sleepy farm village to an industrial center offering employment to hundreds of workers from the surrounding area, ultimately developing it into one of the w’s leading shoe manufacturing enterprises. Around the turn of the century, the firm employed some 3200 workers and produced over two million pairs of shoes a year.

He also served as a lawmaker in various local and federal positions.

== Social initiatives ==
Carl Franz was a progressive liberal, pushing forward many new ideas in the town, now taken for granted. He and his wife opened a special education school for girls, a kindergarten, an old-age home and a public swimming facility at the bordering Aare river. He built homes for workers and converted a flood region of the Aare in town into a luscious, publicly accessible park. He fought battles to break the long established bond between school education and religion and supported the establishment of improved schooling facilities for grade schools and a regional middle school.

== Personal life ==
In 1846, Bally married Cécile Rychner (1823–1893), a daughter of merchant Friedrich Rychner of Aarau. They had two sons;

- Peter "Eduard" Bally (1847–1926), industrialist and politician,
- Arthur Bally (1849–1912), businessman, philanthropist and politician

Both his sons continued the shoe manufacturing business under the name C. F. Bally Söhne. Carl Franz Bally died on 5 August 1899 in Basel, Switzerland aged 77.
