= Kasdorf (surname) =

Kasdorf is a surname. Notable people with the surname include:

- Jason Kasdorf (born 1992), Canadian ice hockey player
- Julia Kasdorf (born 1962), American poet
- Lenore Kasdorf (born 1948), American actress
