= Eduard Bally =

Swiss industrialist (1847–1926)

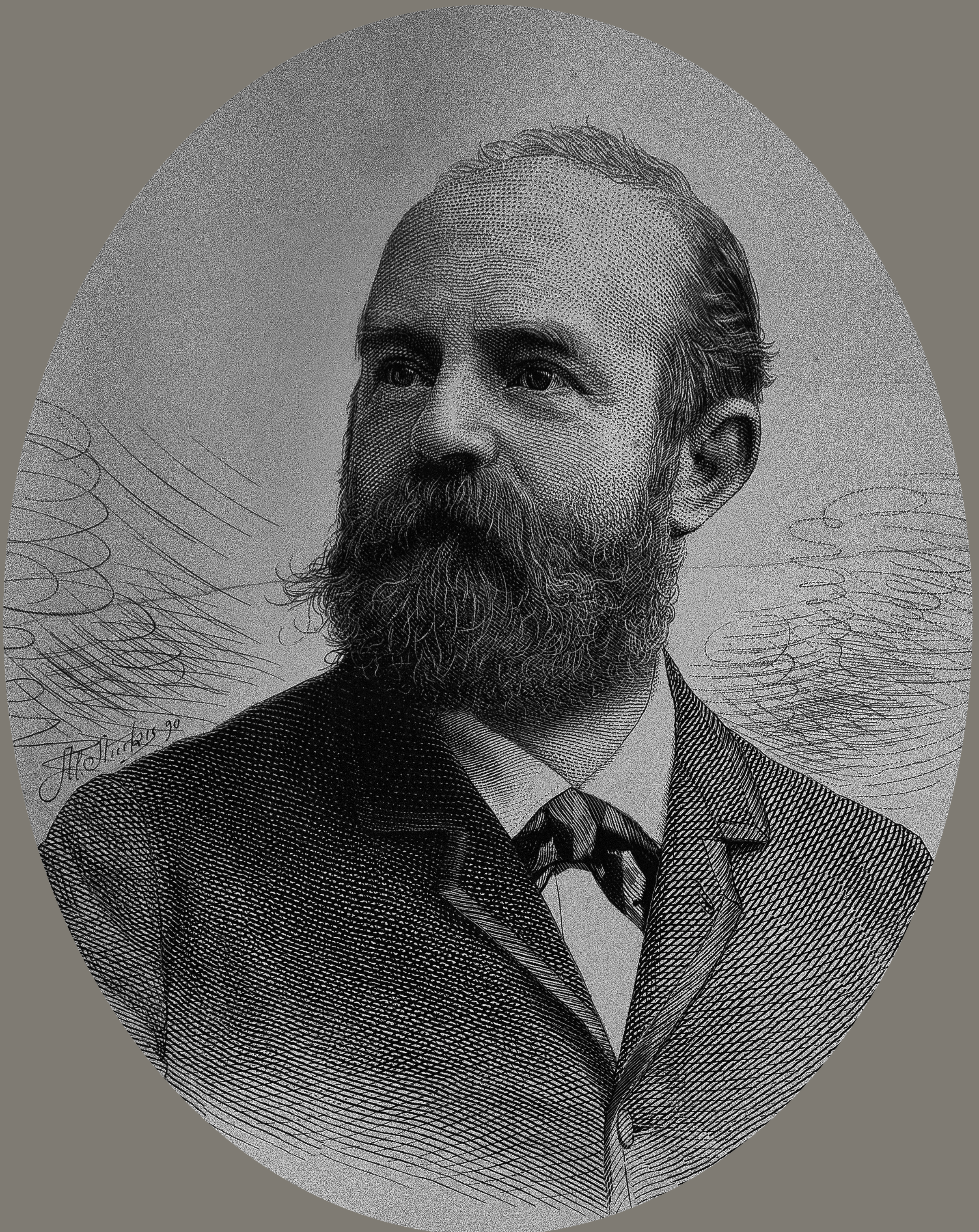
- Bally c. 1890 portrayed by Benjamin J. Falk in New York City

Member of the National Council (Switzerland)
- In office 1 December 1902 – 2 December 1917
- Constituency: Canton of Solothurn

Personal details
- Born: Peter Eduard Bally; 11 August 1847 Schönenwerd, Switzerland
- Died: 24 July 1926 (aged 78) Schönenwerd, Switzerland
- Spouse: Marie Prior (m. 1874)
- Children: 4, including Iwan
- Education: Old Cantonal School Aarau
- Occupation: Industrialist and politician

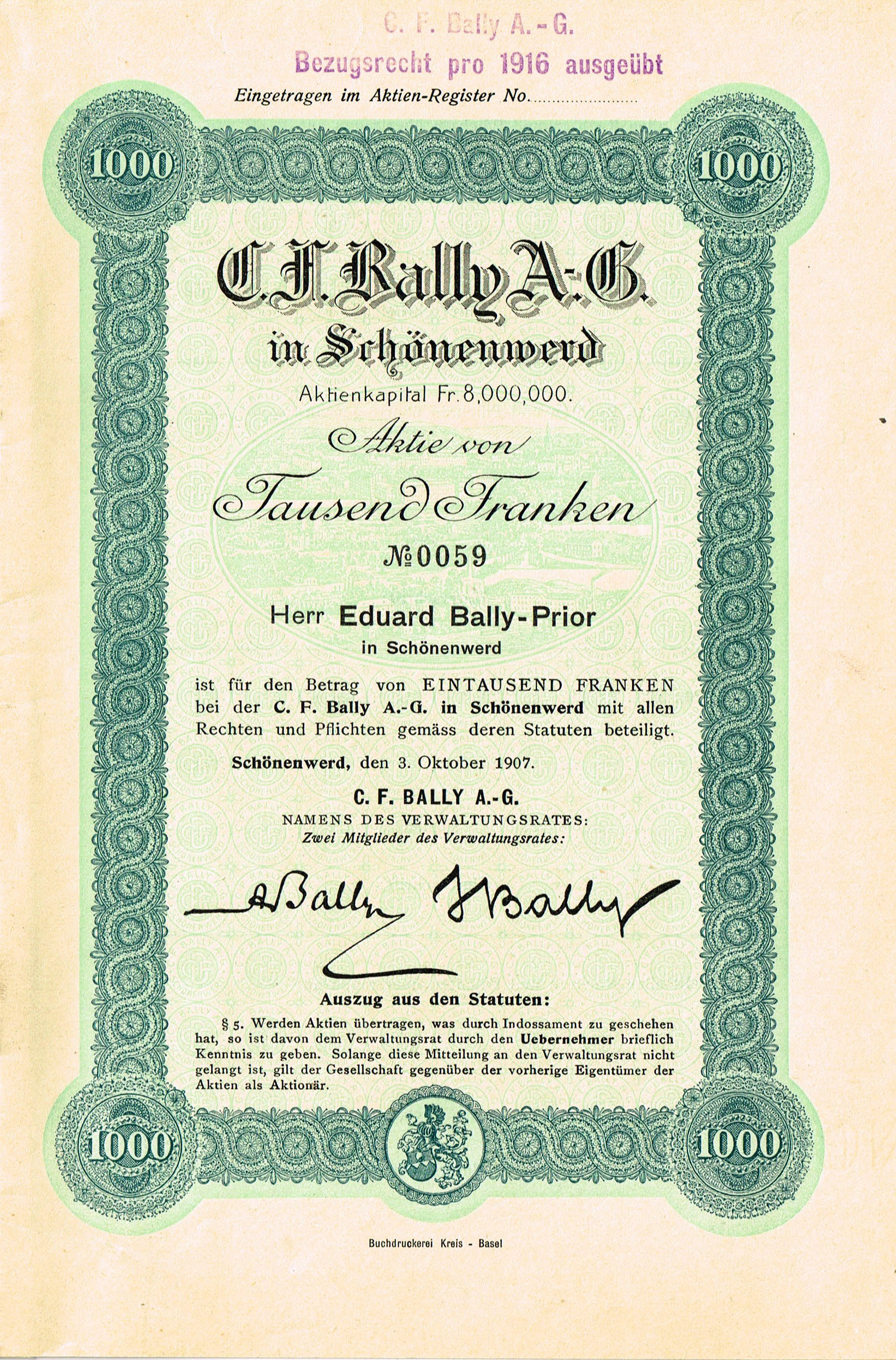
Share of the C. F. Bally AG, 1907 issued to Eduard Bally-Prior

Peter Eduard Bally colloquially Eduard Bally (11 August 1847 – 24 July 1926) was a Swiss industrialist, philanthropist and politician who served on the National Council (Switzerland) from 1902 to 1917. He was the older son of Carl Franz Bally who founded the Bally (fashion house) in 1851.

== Early life and education ==
Bally was born 11 August 1847 in Schönenwerd, Switzerland, the older of two sons, to Carl Franz Bally and Cécile Bally (née Rychner). He was the grandson of Peter Bally (1783–1849), a silk ribbon manufacturer of Austrian descent. He graduated from Old Cantonal School Aarau and completed a technical apprenticeship at Bally followed by a commercial apprenticeship with a private bank in Geneva. He educated himself on the American industry standards with stays in the United States (1869–70 and 1872 and 1876).

== Personal life ==
In 1874, Bally married Lisette Charlotte Elise "Marie" Prior (1849–1923), a daughter of Johann Prior, a pastor, and Helene Prior (née Detmer), of Lower Saxony in the German Empire. They had four children:

- Maria Helene Bally (1875–1954), married Erwin Arnold von Waldkirch (1868–1921), five children.
- Iwan Bally (1876–1965), married Clara Rosalie Wissmann, four children, deemed successor of his father
- Ernst Otto Bally (1879–1960), married Margrit Hüssy (1880–1963), of the Hüssy textile family of Safenwil, two children, he was the founder of Tenuta Bally & Von Teufenstein, a winery and estate in Ticino.
- Eduard Bally Jr. (1881–1928), married Marie Gamper, three children

Bally died on 24 July 1926 in Schönenwerd, Switzerland aged 78.
