= PGSS =

PGSS may refer to:

- Pennsylvania Governor's School for the Sciences
- Paget Gorman Signed Speech
- Prince George Secondary School, a high school in Prince George, British Columbia
- Point Grey Secondary School, a high school in Vancouver, British Columbia
- Panionios G.S.S., a Greek football club based in Nea Smyrni, Athens
- Particles from Gas Saturated Solutions, a method used for micronization of substances
