= Pennsylvania Governor's School for the Arts =

Residential public school in Erie, Pennsylvania

Coordinates: 42.10528°N 80.05396°W

- Pennsylvania; USA

Information
- Type: Residential Public
- Motto: Latin: Carpe diem (Seize the Day)
- Established: 1973
- Closed: 2009
- Director: Arthur Gatty, Douglas Woods
- Grades: 11th and 12th
- Enrollment: about 200

The Pennsylvania Governor's School for the Arts (PGSA) was a Pennsylvania state-funded five-week summer academy for gifted high school students, active from 1973 to 2009. It was hosted first at Bucknell University in Lewisburg, Pennsylvania, from 1973 to 1989, and then at Mercyhurst College in Erie, Pennsylvania, from 1990 to 2009.

The school was one of the Pennsylvania Governor's Schools of Excellence, a group of five-week summer academies for gifted high school students in the Commonwealth of Pennsylvania.

PGSA was defunded by Pennsylvania's 2009–2010 state budget.

== History ==
The Pennsylvania Governor's School for the Arts was established earliest among eight such Governor's schools. Like other Pennsylvania Governor's Schools of Excellence, PGSA operated on a state-funded, scholarship basis upon its inception in 1973 under Milton Shapp.

PGSA was hosted at Bucknell University in Lewisburg under the direction of Arthur Gatty, who led the program until 1988. It was seen as an early leader in such programs, and among the first in the country. By 1985, the school drew 225 students from 2,000 applicants. In 1990, the program relocated to Mercyhurst College, in Erie.

Similar to a college experience, students took classes associated with a "major" in one of five art areas: creative writing, dance, music, theater, or visual arts.

In addition to these classes, students selected an elective class in an art area other than their primary. Collaboration and multifaceted projects were encouraged and common. Alongside classes, nightly performances and gallery shows combined with a broad range of social activities and special events to create a unique experience similar to that of an artists' colony.

Governor Ed Rendell's 2009–2010 budget proposed cutting funding for all the schools in the PGSE program, including PGSA. The program was discontinued in 2009, after 36 years of operation.

== Notable alumni ==
- Kevin Bacon ('74)
- Melinda Wagner ('74)
- Richard O'Donnell ('74)
- Aaron Jay Kernis ('75)
- Megan Gallagher ('76)
- Gary Schocker ('76)
- Boris Bally ('77)
- Ian Gallanar ('78)
- Suzanne Keen ('79)
- Daniel Roebuck ('79)
- Alice Sebold ('79)
- Julia Kasdorf ('80)
- Tina Fey ('87)
- Rebecca Wisocky
- Ari Hoenig ('90)
- Asali Solomon ('90)
- Steve Burns ('91)
- Meagan Miller ('91)
- Matthew Hoch ('93)
- Zachary Quinto ('94)
- Neal Dodson ('94)
- Cristin O'Keefe Aptowicz ('95)
- Lucas Steele (‘96)
- Stephen Karam ('97)
- Katharine Beutner ('98)
- Gillian Jacobs ('99)
- Andy Mientus ('04)
- Derek Hansen ('07)
- Honey Davenport
