= Barry Luokkala =

American educator and physicist (1954–2026)

Barry Luokkala (June 23, 1954 – September 23, 2026) was an American physicist who was a faculty member at Carnegie Mellon University for his entire career, from 1980 until his death in 2026. He was Director of Undergraduate Physics Laboratories in the Department of Physics at Carnegie Mellon from 2001 to 2024, when he became an emeritus teaching professor. He was Program Director for the Pennsylvania Governor's School for the Sciences. Luokkala was the recipient of the MCS Teaching Award. He died on September 23, 2026, at the age of 72.

== PGSS directorship ==
The Pennsylvania Governor's School for the Sciences (PGSS) is an academic summer program for gifted high school students from Pennsylvania. Luokkala was the director of PGSS from 2001 to 2023. Prior to that, he ran both the Physics lab course and team projects for many years.
