= Meagan Miller =

American soprano

Meagan Miller is an American soprano with an active international career in opera, recital and concert.

== Early life ==
Miller was born in Wilmington, Delaware and grew up in West Chester, Ohio and Chadds Ford, Pennsylvania.

She attended high school at Archmere Academy and was selected for the 1991 Pennsylvania Governor's School for the Arts. Miller then studied at Washington and Lee University for two years, where she performed her first operatic role, the Countess in Mozart's The Marriage of Figaro, and also gave her first solo recital.

She transferred to the Juilliard School in New York City, where she received her bachelor's degree, then continued her studies with the Juilliard Opera Center.

Miller's major teachers during her education were Mary Ellen Schauber, Dan Pressley, Josepha Gayer, and Cynthia Hoffmann, who she studied with at The Juilliard School.

== Career ==
As a winner of the Joy In Singing Award, Miller made her New York City recital debut in the autumn of 1998. The program included songs by Barber, Montsalvatge, Debussy, Griffes and Wolf, and was reviewed in The New York Times by Paul Griffiths. She was also one of five winners of the Metropolitan Opera National Council Auditions in 1999, where she performed "Martern aller Arten" from Die Entführung aus dem Serail and "Ain't it a Pretty Night?" from Carlisle Floyd's Susannah with the orchestra conducted by Edoardo Muller, in a performance that The New York Times described as proving "her agility, thrust and command of intonation', with a voice that is "strong and brilliant".

She subsequently appeared with the Opera Orchestra of New York, New York City Opera, Opera Theatre of Saint Louis, the Minnesota Opera, the Minnesota Orchestra, Opéra de Montréal, Orlando Opera, Kentucky Opera, Syracuse Opera, Eugene Opera, San Francisco Opera's Merola Program, and Wolf Trap Opera in a variety of leading soprano roles including Mozart's Fiordiligi (Così fan tutte), Donna Anna and Donna Elvira (Don Giovanni), Konstanze (Die Entführung aus dem Serail), Countess Almaviva (The Marriage of Figaro), Violetta (La traviata), Desdemona (Otello), Musetta (La bohème), Marguerite (Faust), Rosalinda (Die Fledermaus), Euridice (Orfeo ed Euridice), Laurie (The Tender Land), and the title role in Susannah.

Miller completed several residencies with the Marilyn Horne Foundation, the Steans Institute at the Ravinia Festival and the Wolf Trap Foundation, which combined performing and outreach, and in 2008 won both the George London/Kirsten Flagstad Award sponsored by The New York Community Trust and the George London Foundation Vienna Prize.

In June 2009, Miller made her European operatic debut as Ariadne in the Vienna Volksoper's new production of Richard Strauss' Ariadne auf Naxos. Her Vienna debut led to further performances at important European opera houses, such as the State Operas of Vienna, Munich and Hamburg, of roles in the late-Romantic German repertoire, primarily Wagner and Strauss, as well as the heavier Puccini roles such as Minnie in La fanciulla del West. In September 2013, Miller sang Marietta/Marie in a concert performance of Korngold's Die tote Stadt in Boston, a role she then sang on stage at the New National Theatre Tokyo in March 2014 and at the Hamburg State Opera under Simone Young in 2015. Miller made her Metropolitan Opera debut as the Kaiserin in Richard Strauss' Die Frau ohne Schatten in November 2013 with Vladimir Jurowski conducting.

Miller has appeared in many art song recitals and frequently includes music by contemporary composers. She has premiered several works written specifically for her voice, including Libby Larsen's Try Me, Good King: Last Words of the Wives of Henry VIII and Robert Beaser's Four Dickinson Songs.

She has also premiered numerous other works, including pieces by Thomas Cipullo, Christopher Berg, and Russell Platt. At her 2002 recital at Merkin Concert Hall, she performed a group of Richard Strauss songs that opened with "Das Rosenband" (Op. 36, No. 1), and also included "Meinem Kinde" (Op. 37, No. 3) and "Ständchen" (Op. 17, No. 2) as well as Poulenc's Trois Poèmes de Louise de Vilmorin and Métamorphoses, Debussy's early Proses Lyriques, and Beaser's Four Dickinson Songs. The New York Times review described Miller as "an agreeably flexible interpreter" with "considerable communicative powers" who sang "with a combination of gracefulness and energy that got to the core of the music she offered".

As a soloist in works for voice and orchestra, she has sung in Beethoven's Mass in C major, Missa Solemnis, and Symphony No. 9; Handel's Messiah; Haydn's The Creation; Brahms' Ein Deutsches Requiem; Mozart's Requiem and Exsultate, jubilate; Bruckner's Mass in F minor; Poulenc's Gloria; Dvořák's Requiem, Vaughan Williams' Dona nobis pacem; and Orff's Carmina Burana.

Miller can be heard in commercial recordings of Richard Strauss' Die Liebe der Danae and Bruckner's Mass in F minor (both with the American Symphony Orchestra under Leon Botstein), Beethoven's Symphony No. 9, and The Marilyn Horne Foundation Presents On Wings Of Song (1999/2000 season).
