= Pennsylvania Governor's School for the Agricultural Sciences =

The Pennsylvania Governor's School for the Agricultural Sciences (PGSAS) is one of the eight Pennsylvania Governor's Schools of Excellence, a group of five-week summer programs for gifted high school students in the state of Pennsylvania .

== History and notable features ==
The Penn State University main campus hosts the agricultural sciences as well as the information technology Schools of Excellence. Participants are required to be Pennsylvania high school students who have just completed their sophomore or junior years.

Admission into the program is selective with sixty-four available spots. The aim of PGSAS is to provide a sampling of many different branches of agricultural science and to encourage continuing studies in the discipline. The curriculum includes coursework, laboratories, and field experiences in:

Webpage development, genetics, leadership, professional development, reproductive physiology, waste management, contemporary agriculture issues, natural resource conservation, nuclear science, poultry science, lactation science, food science, horticulture, environmental resources engineering, agribusiness, food engineering, agronomy

In addition to classes and lab experience, each student must complete an Independent Study Project (ISP) for which they are assigned a topic (scholars rank their preferences in advance) and an advisor. Scholars present their research at an annual symposium and are evaluated by their advisors and peers. During their time at PGSAS, scholars also complete webpages to summarize their experiences, reflect on the program, and provide personal and academic information.

Students take numerous trips to various facilities on or around Penn State Campus, including the Swine Barns, Beef & Sheep Barns, Chicken Facilities, and Penn State Spikes Field.

Former Pennsylvania Governor Ed Rendell has proposed cutting fund for all the PGSEs, including PGSAS, from the 2009-2010 budget.
