= Rhuigi Villaseñor =

Filipino-American fashion designer

Rhuigi Villaseñor is the founder and fashion designer of the luxury streetwear brand Rhude, and was the creative director of BALLY from 2022 to 2023. Villaseñor collaborated with McLaren on a capsule collection in 2021. In 2023, he was sued by a minority stakeholder of Rhude for raiding the company funds.
