= Pennsylvania Governor's Schools of Excellence =

- Pennsylvania, United States

Information
- Type: Summer program for gifted high school students
- Established: 2009 (as publicly funded summer program)
- Founder: Pennsylvania Governor Ed Rendell
- Closed: Some programs have been closed
- Website: Official Website

The Pennsylvania Governor's Schools of Excellence (PGSE) are five-week, publicly funded summer program for gifted high school students.

Pennsylvania Governor Ed Rendell cut funding for the PGSE program in the state's 2009-2010 budget. Five of the programs have been privately revived and are functioning members of the National Conference of Governor's Schools as of 2014.

== Programs ==
- The Pennsylvania Governor's School for the Agricultural Sciences at the Pennsylvania State University
- The Pennsylvania Governor's School for Engineering and Technology at Lehigh University
- The Pennsylvania Governor's School for Global Entrepreneurship at Lehigh University - (renamed the Pennsylvania School for Global Entrepreneurship)
- The Pennsylvania Governor's School for Information, Society & Technology at Drexel - closed
- The Pennsylvania Governor's School for Health Care at the University of Pittsburgh - (renamed the University of Pittsburgh Health Career Scholars Academy)
- The Pennsylvania Governor's School for the Sciences at Carnegie Mellon University
- The Pennsylvania Governor's School for the Arts at Mercyhurst University - closed
- The Pennsylvania Governor's School for Global & International Studies at the University of Pittsburgh
- The Pennsylvania Governor's School for Excellence in Teaching at (Millersville State University) --closed
