= Pennsylvania Governor's School for Information, Society & Technology =

The Pennsylvania Governor's School for the Information, Society & Technology (PGSIST) is one of the Pennsylvania Governor's Schools of Excellence, a group of five-week summer programs for gifted high school students in the state of Pennsylvania.

== History and notable features ==
PGSIST is hosted by the iSchool at Drexel University and aims to provide participants with a strong technological foundation in conjunction with an understanding of how technology impacts society. Participants are required to be Pennsylvania high school students between their junior and senior year and must live in the dormitories for the full five weeks of the program.

Prior to 2006, PGSIST was known as the Pennsylvania Governor's School for Information Technology (PGSIT) and jointly sponsored by both Drexel University and Pennsylvania State University.

Pennsylvania Governor Ed Rendell has proposed cutting fund for all the PGSEs, including PGSIST, from the 2009-2010 budget.

== Curriculum ==
The program is roughly divided into two halves. The first half of the program consists of core courses which all students must take, such as programming, ethics, and database design.

The second half of the program consists of what are known as "tracks"; students are assigned to a track based on their preferences and space availability, and they spend the entire academic day studying that particular area.

In the past, tracks have included topics such as Networking and Distributed Computing, Advanced Programming, and E-Commerce, but tracks change from year to year. In addition to coursework, participants are required to complete a project; the project begins shortly after the program starts and commences on the final day with presentations. Several projects from 2005 are described in a Drexel University Press Release.
