= Drexel University School of Computer and Information Sciences =

School of computer and information sciences in Philadelphia, Pennsylvania, U.S.

Coordinates: 39.9568°N 75.195169°W

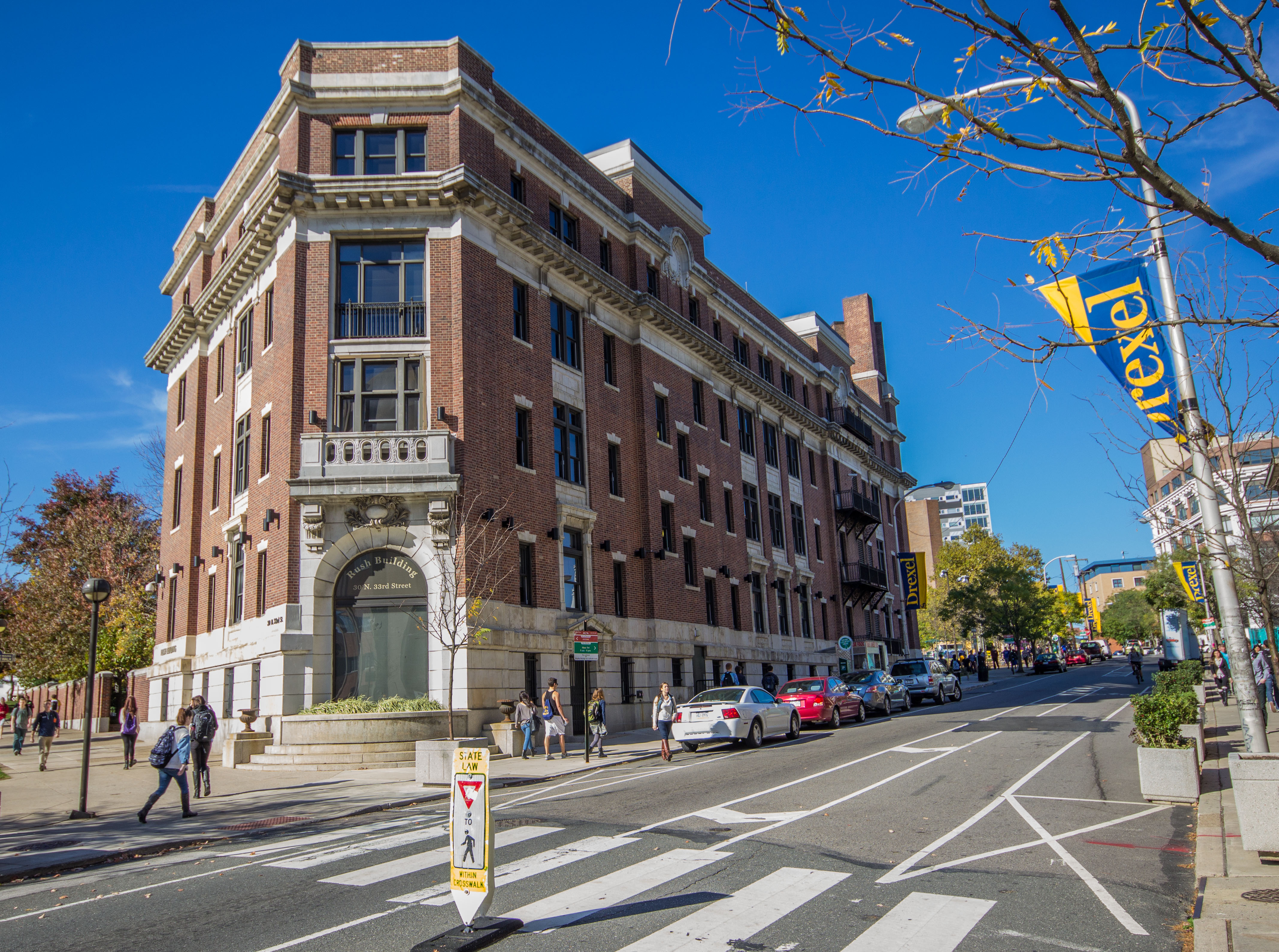
- The Rush Building, one of the former buildings of the School of Computer & Information Sciences
- Established: 2026
- Affiliations: Drexel University
- Head: Ali Shokoufandeh
- Location: Philadelphia, Pennsylvania, USA
- Campus: University City Campus
- Website: drexel.edu/cci

The Drexel University School of Computer & Information Sciences (SCIS), formerly the College of Computing & Informatics (CCI), is one of three schools in the Nick Howley College of Engineering & Computing, the largest college at Drexel University in Philadelphia, Pennsylvania. SCIS contributes to theory and practice across the computer and information sciences, spanning considerations that include the "technical, human, organizational, policy and societal" aspects of information and digital technology.

SCIS faculty and administrative offices, research laboratories, collaborative learning spaces, and classrooms are located at 3675 Market Street in Philadelphia, at the western edge of Drexel's University City Campus. Currently, the 10th and 11th floors, and half the 9th floor, are occupied by SCIS. Students have access to the high-quality workspaces, which are provided and operated by CIC. Furthermore, students have access to a cafe on the 1st floor of 3675 Market Street and The Quorum, a conference space.

SCIS is part of the iSchools Caucus, and the former College of Information Science and Technology was one of the three founding members of the iSchool Caucus.

== History ==
The School of Computer & Information Sciences was created in 2026 as a result of merging the College of Computing & Informatics (CCI) with the College of Engineering (now School of Engineering) and the School of Biomedical Engineering and Science. The school houses two departments: Information Science and Computer Science.

Previously, CCI was created in 2013 as a result of merging the former College of Information Science and Technology (iSchool), the Department of Computer Science, and the Department of Computing and Security Technology.

The former iSchool hosted the Pennsylvania Governor's School for Information, Society and Technology (PGSIST) from 1998 until 2008, at which time the PGSIST was canceled due to statewide budget cuts. The program included a full scholarship summer enrichment program which was committed to meeting the educational needs of academically talented high school students through a five-week-long on college campus program.

Details regarding the history of the iSchool is below:

- School of Computer and Information Sciences (2026–present)
- 2013–2026 College of Computing and Informatics
- 1995-2013 College of Information Science and Technology
- 1985-1995 College of Information Studies
- 1979-1985 School of Library and Information Science
- 1942-1979 Graduate School of Library Science
- 1922-1942 School of Library Science
- 1900-1914 Library School
- 1893-1900 Library Dept.
- 1892-1893 Library and Reading Room

=== Facilities ===
In April 2019, the college consolidated facilities for faculty, staff, and students, moving into leased space in uCity Square, a complex of buildings in University City operated by the University City Science Center. State of the art offices and classrooms dedicated to the CCI (as of 2026, SCIS) occupied two floors of the building at 3675 Market Street. On May 2, 2019, a ribbon cutting ceremony was held to officially open the space. In September 2019, a third floor opened with the DXC Technology Innovation Lab, a maker space, a research lab, and additional offices and classrooms for faculty and students.

The College's former facilities include the Rush Building at the corner of 33rd Street and Lancaster Avenue. Constructed in 1904, the Hospital for the Treatment of Consumption and Related Diseases was named after Benjamin Rush, the famous 18th-century Philadelphia physician and one of the signers of the Declaration of Independence. In 1961, Drexel University acquired the building to in part house its Graduate School of Library Science.

From 1978 to 1981, the Rush Building was renovated for sole use by the library and information science programs. The project cost $2.4 million, $1 million of which came from a Pew Charitable Trusts grant. In 2006 the lobby was renovated and the Alumni Garden was expanded. In 2008, the Computing Resource Center (computer lab for use exclusively by IST students) was remodeled and renamed the iCommons.

== Programs ==
=== Undergraduate ===
The College of Computing & Informatics offers seven undergraduate programs: the Bachelor of Science in Artificial Intelligence & Machine Learning, Computer Science (BSCS), Computing and Security Technology (BSCST), Data Science (BSDS), Economics and Data Science (BSECDS), Information (BSINFO), and Software Engineering (BSSE). Most undergraduates take part in Drexel's co-op program, which provides work experience before graduation.

=== Graduate ===
The school offers seven master's programs, including MS degree programs in Artificial Intelligence and Machine Learning (MS-AI/ML), Computer Science (MSCS), Data Science (MS DS), Human–Computer Interaction & User Experience (MS-HCI/UX), Information Systems (MSIS), Library and Information Science (MSI-LIS), and Software Engineering (MSSE).

The school also awards PhD degrees in Information Science and Computer Science.

== Rankings ==
Drexel University overall is ranked 80th among colleges and universities in the United States, 2nd for co-ops and internships, 44th among private colleges and universities, and 79th for best value.

Regarding SCIS, in 2025 College Factual placed SCIS in the top 15% for computer science undergraduate programs in the United States, and TechGuide named SCIS's Master's in AI/ML 3rd out of all master’s in artificial intelligence programs.

The school's library and information science master's program is also historically significant and highly ranked. In 2025, U.S. News and World Report ranked the School of Computer and Information Sciences’s Library and Information Science master's as 13th best from the 56 programs evaluated. Its Information Systems specialization ranks first, and its digital librarianship specialization ranks third.

In 2020 Cyber Degrees ranked the school as having the number 1 online undergraduate Cybersecurity degree program in the US.

In 2020 the school was ranked in the top 5 schools in the US for Information Science degrees by College Factual.

In 2019 the school was ranked in the top 20 in the US for Online Graduate Computer Information Technology Programs by U.S.News & World Report.

In 2018 the school was ranked in the top 25 STEM schools in the US by Forbes.

In 2018 the school was ranked in the top 10 in the US for Best Online Colleges for Master's in Library Science by The Guide to Online Schools/SR Education Group.

In 2013, U.S. News & World Report ranked The iSchool, College of Information Science and Technology's library and information science graduate program 10th in the nation for Library Science master's programs as part of the 2014 "America's Best Graduate Schools" edition.

The College was also ranked by U.S. News & World Report in 2013 in the following specialties: Health Librarianship (#1), Information Systems (#3), Digital Librarianship (#6), Services for Children and Youth (#9), School Library Media (#10), and Archives and Preservation (#12).

In 2009, U.S. News & World Report ranked The iSchool, College of Information Science and Technology's library and information science graduate program 9th for Library and Information Studies Specialties.

In 2007, the College ranked 5th nationally for specialized programs in information systems, 6th nationally for specialized programs in digital librarianship. Overall the library and information science program was ranked 11th for Library and Information Studies Specialties.
