= Julia Kasdorf =

American poet (born 1962)

- Born: 1962 (age 63–64)

Signature
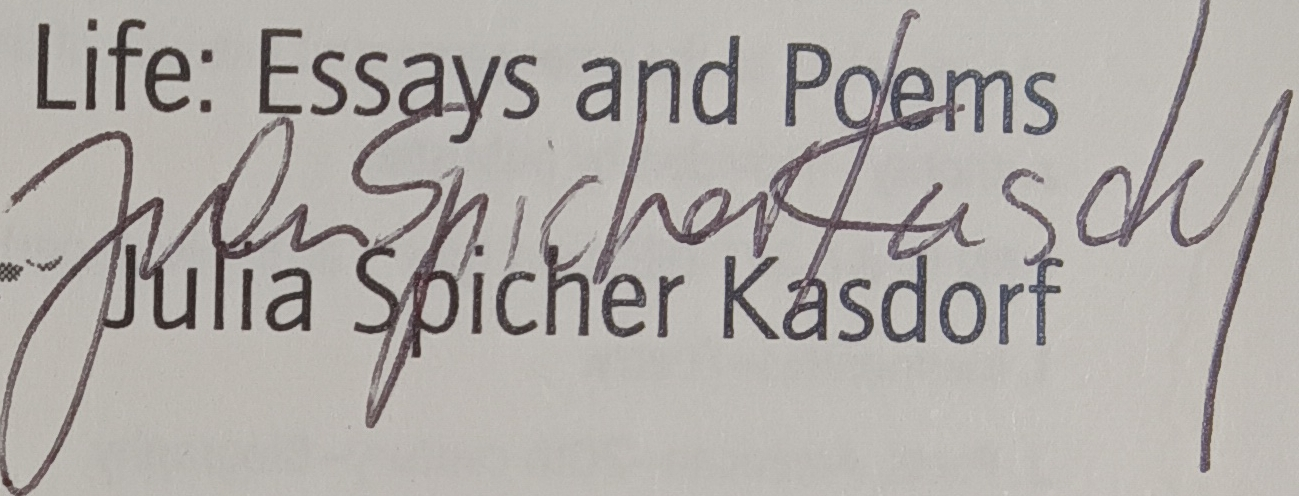

Julia Mae Spicher Kasdorf (born December 6, 1962) is an American poet.

== Early years and education ==
Born in Lewistown, Pennsylvania, Julia Spicher grew up in the suburbs of Pittsburgh near Irwin, Westmoreland County. Her parents were Mennonites born in Big Valley, Pennsylvania, who chose to leave their rural community in central Pennsylvania to work in an urban setting. Spicher attended Goshen College, in Goshen, Indiana, but completed her B.A. and Ph.D. at New York University. As a student at Goshen College, Spicher visited China in the autumn of 1982 for the Study-Service Trimester at Sichuan Teachers College. She published Moss Lotus, a chapbook of poetry inspired by her experiences in China, as a sophomore English major at Goshen in 1983. She earned her B.A., M.A. in creative writing, and Ph.D. from New York University (1997), where she studied with poet Yehuda Amichai, among others. Her Ph.D. dissertation, Fixing tradition: The cultural work of Joseph W. Yoder and his relationship with the Amish community of Mifflin County, Pennsylvania, was supervised by Gordon M. Pradl.

Spicher Kasdorf began to write poetry seriously during her high school years and credits the Poets in the Schools program for nurturing her interest in writing. Her first published poem appeared in 1977 in Images Remembered II, an anthology of the Poets-in-the-Schools Program of the Pennsylvania Council on the Arts. She also wrote in workshops at Summer Happening '79 and under Deborah Burnham and H. L. Van Brunt at Pennsylvania Governor's School for the Arts in 1980. In 1981, she won the Scholastic Writing Awards with work that was then published in Literary Cavalcade. While a student at Goshen College she also had poems published in With, Builder, Christian Living, and the college publications Record and Broadside.

== Career ==
Kasdorf is the author of three poetry collections--Sleeping Preacher (1992), Eve's Striptease (1998), and Poetry in America (2011)--all published by the University of Pittsburgh Press. Sleeping Preacher won the Agnes Lynch Starrett Poetry Prize and the Great Lakes College's Association Award for New Writing, and Eve's Striptease was named one of the top 20 poetry books of 1998 by Library Journal. She also co-edited an anthology, Broken Land: Poems of Brooklyn, with Michael Tyrell (New York University Press, 2007). Kasdorf was awarded a 2009 NEA fellowship for poetry and is the recipient of a Pushcart Prize. She is also the author of a scholarly study of Pennsylvania writer Joseph Yoder, Fixing Tradition, and co-editor of two editions of Pennsylvania local color novels, Rosanna of the Amish by Joseph W. Yoder and The House of the Black Ring by Fred Lewis Pattee. Her essay collection, The Body and the Book: Writing a Mennonite Life, was awarded the Book of the Year award by the Conference on Christianity and Literature. She is Professor of English and Women's Studies at the Pennsylvania State University.

In The Body and the Book, Kasdorf explores the cultural and geographical inspiration for her writing in her Mennonite and Amish communities of origin, as well as in New York City where she studied creative writing and published her first book. In her essay, "A Place to Begin," she comments, "I liked being able to think in the free space between places . . . As poetry's power often comes from linking two unlike things to release new insight, so my life has been charged by the experience of embodying a connection between disparate locations" (p. 8).

Kasdorf was often criticized for being the rare Mennonite poet who expressed her encounters publicly. She was one of the first Mennonite poets to cross the boundaries of writers and express encounters that she experienced as a child. For example, in "Sinning", she states, "When I was seven, Mom asked if I knew what rabbits in the hutch were up to. 'Fucking,' farm cousins told me long before. 'We call it intercourse,' she said and began the cautionary tales right then." This is an example of how Kasdorf's attitude being a Mennonite poet was completely different toward the public. Mennonites consider themselves a closed community which meant that they do not express or associate their personal/ community issues to any outside person(s). They like to keep any or all personal issues within their environment. However, in Kasdorf's case she took the initiative to not only express personal issues of Mennonites but to publish them and become an award-winning poet for her courageous acts and writing. She covered many topics that one would not expect to read about from a Mennonite poet such as desires, marriage, domestic life, and personal encounters she had with other Mennonites whether it was in her hometown or on her journey to becoming a writer.

== Awards and recognition ==
Spicher Kasdorf won the 1991 Agnes Lynch Starrett Poetry Prize for her first book, Sleeping Preacher. She has since won the Great Lakes Colleges Award for New Writing (1993), Book of the Year Award from the Conference on Christianity and Literature (2001), and the Pushcart Prize (poetry) (2004). She was awarded an NEA Grant for Poetry in 2009.

== Works ==
Poetry

- Moss Lotus (chapbook), with illustrations by Suelyn Lee. Pinchpenny Press, 1983. Published as Julia Spicher.
- Sleeping Preacher. University of Pittsburgh Press, 1992.
- Eve's Striptease. University of Pittsburgh Press, 1998.
- Poetry in America. University of Pittsburgh Press, 2011.
- Shale Play: Poems and Photographs from the Fracking Fields, with photographs by Steven Rubin. Penn State University Press, 2018.

Spicher Kasdorf's poems have appeared in The New Yorker, The Paris Review, and numerous other journals and anthologies.

Essays, Biography, and Edited Volumes

- The Body and the Book: Writing from a Mennonite Life. Johns Hopkins University Press, 2001. Reprinted by Penn State University Press, 2009.
- Fixing Tradition: Joseph W. Yoder, Amish American. Herald Press, 2003.
- Broken Land: Poems of Brooklyn. Edited by Julia Spicher Kasdorf and Michael Tyrell. New York University Press, 2007.
- Rosanna of the Amish by Joseph W. Yoder, edited by Julia Spicher Kasdorf and Joshua R. Brown. Herald Press, 2008.
- The House of the Black Ring: A Romance of the Seven Mountains by Fred Lewis Pattee, with an introduction by Julia Spicher Kasdorf and notes by Joshua R. Brown. Penn State University Press, 2012.

== See also ==
- Kauffman Amish Mennonite, also called Sleeping Preacher Churches
