= Pennsylvania Governor's School for the Sciences =

The Pennsylvania Governor's School for the Sciences (PGSS) is now the only remaining part of the Pennsylvania Governor's Schools of Excellence, a group of five-week summer programs for selected high-school students in the state of Pennsylvania.

Carnegie Mellon University in Pittsburgh has hosted the program since its inception in 1982.

== Notable Aspects ==
Most recently, it has been directed by Biology Professor Natalie McGuier, the successor of Physics Professor Barry Luokkala. Participants are required to be Pennsylvania high school students between their junior and senior years and are required to live in the dormitories for the full five weeks of the program.

Admission is competitive and merit-based with approximately five hundred scientifically inclined students across the Commonwealth of Pennsylvania applying for seventy-two slots in the program. Around thirty-six male and thirty-six female students participate each year.

The aim of PGSS is to promote interest in science rather than to advance students' knowledge in a specific area. The curriculum includes five "core" courses in Biology, Chemistry, Computer Science, Mathematics and Physics, and numerous electives. In addition to taking classes, students are required to participate in a lab course and a research-style team project. The emphasis is on cooperation, rather than competition, with students encouraged to collaborate with other students on academic work and interact socially.

The Residence Life staff provides a number of structured social events to foster friendship and teamwork. Most students attend an organized reunion the following year.

== Discontinuation and Restoration ==
PGSS was discontinued in 2009 by Governor Ed Rendell who cut all funding for PGSEs from the 2009-2010 budget.

After the program closed, a group of PGSS alumni and parent volunteers worked on the restoration of PGSS. This included the following milestones: organizing PGSS Campaign, Inc. as a registered 501(c)3 nonprofit organization, locating over 95% of the 2400 alumni, and many of their parents, collecting over $900,000 in donations from these individuals, meeting with former Governor Thomas Corbett and several former Secretaries of Education, meeting with key legislative leaders in Pennsylvania, hiring a part-time Executive Director, gaining formal recognition as an Education Improvement Organization (EITC), and securing numerous corporate grants.

Since then, PGSS alumni have donated over $1,500,000 to the program.

After several years of work by PGSS Campaign, the Commonwealth of Pennsylvania awarded Carnegie Mellon University a matching $150,000 grant to operate PGSS in 2013 and 2014. This provided half of the required funds for a fifty-four-student program. To secure the funding from the state, the non-profit PGSS Campaign, Inc. had to agree to match those funds, and raised that and more to allow sixty students to attend each summer.

PGSS was ultimately restored in 2013, and PGSS 2014 followed the next summer. Although Governor Corbett put a line item in the 2014 budget, the legislature took it out in the final version. TeamPA provided the matching $150,000 grant to Carnegie Mellon for PGSS 2015, and PGSS Campaign continued to raise funds for the match. PGSS Campaign hosted PGSS 2016 through 2019 with only in-kind support from the Commonwealth due to the generosity of PGSS alumni, family and friends as well as corporate support secured by PGSS Campaign.

The PGSS Campaign is still in discussion with the state about funding and has had some funding from the state in 2021 and 2022. PGSS Campaign hopes to increase the number of students even more, closer to the earlier ninety-student program. PGSS 2022 had seventy-two students in attendance.

PGSS Campaign, Inc. also functions as a PGSS alumni association and organizes reunions. PGSS Campaign also started a mentoring program connecting recent alumni with alumni from previous years which has operated successfully since 2013.

== Core Courses ==
None of the teachers of the core courses are required to teach any one particular area or course. They are simply hired to teach a course in the general subject area. As a result, the core courses vary from year to year; however, it is typical for the Biology course to be in HIV/AIDS Biotechnology, the Chemistry course to be in Organic Chemistry, the Mathematics Course on Discrete Mathematics and the Physics course typically covers concepts in Modern Physics, often focusing on Special Relativity. The Computer Science Course covers basic programming concepts and offers independent study for those with experience.

As it is not unusual for a student in the PGSS program to be unfamiliar with a topic, it is common for the students to help one another to stay abreast of the workload. Students can also consult teaching assistants, who are often college students or former PGSS participants, for advice.

The core professors often return for multiple summers. Dr. Mark Farrell of Point Park University usually teaches the chemistry course and is the only faculty to have been with the program since the beginning of the program.

== Lab Courses ==
A laboratory course is offered in every subject. Typically, one or more inter-disciplinary laboratory courses are added, such as Organic Chemistry. Depending on the subject area, it may be required that the laboratory course and the Team Project be taken together to better prepare students for the rigor of the team project.

== Elective Courses ==
Students have the option of attending up to three of the ten Elective Courses offered. Usually, several electives, including Astrophysics and Laser Technology are consistently offered every year, although content in these courses may change.

== Team Projects ==
All PGSS students are required to participate in a team project. The areas generally match the areas of the core courses. These team projects, each culminating in a final scientific research paper, are presented during the last week of the PGSS program known as "Team Project Week." During Team Project Week, no classes are held, due to the immense demand on the participants' time from their research paper and presentations. The final papers are compiled for the PGSS Journal.

== Homework and Assessment ==
The PGSS program strives to emulate the modern scientific community by encouraging collaboration and cooperation among students as they complete their assignments. The homework problems are often designed to require copious amounts of time and effort if one attempts to solve them without teaming up, thus encouraging a cooperative atmosphere. In addition to this, students participating in this program are not ranked among their peers, thus removing any reason for isolation solely to stand out.

While there are no grades given, all participants receive an evaluation letter based on input from teaching assistants and professors at the conclusion of the program.

== Student Life ==
Students in the PGSS program (colloquially referred to as "Govies") participate in daily social activities, typically on the weekends and after classes. These activities can range from spending a day at Kennywood Amusement Park to indoor trivia nights. Program participants are encouraged to join in on these activities to form meaningful friendships and embody the collaborative spirit that PGSS promotes.

During the weekend before the last week of the program, PGSS students have the opportunity to meet with previous PGSS alumni for advice navigating the college application process. Additionally, participants are also encouraged to take advantage of the opportunities on the Carnegie Mellon University campus.
