= Old Cantonal School Aarau =

Coordinates: 47.3933°N 8.0528°E

Alte Kantonsschule Aarau / AKSA / Alte Kanti

Location
- Bahnhofsstrasse 91; Aarau; Aargau / Argovia; Switzerland

Information
- Established: 1802
- Headmaster: Dr. Andreas Hunziker
- Teaching staff: 190
- Enrollment: 1400
- Website: https://altekanti.ch
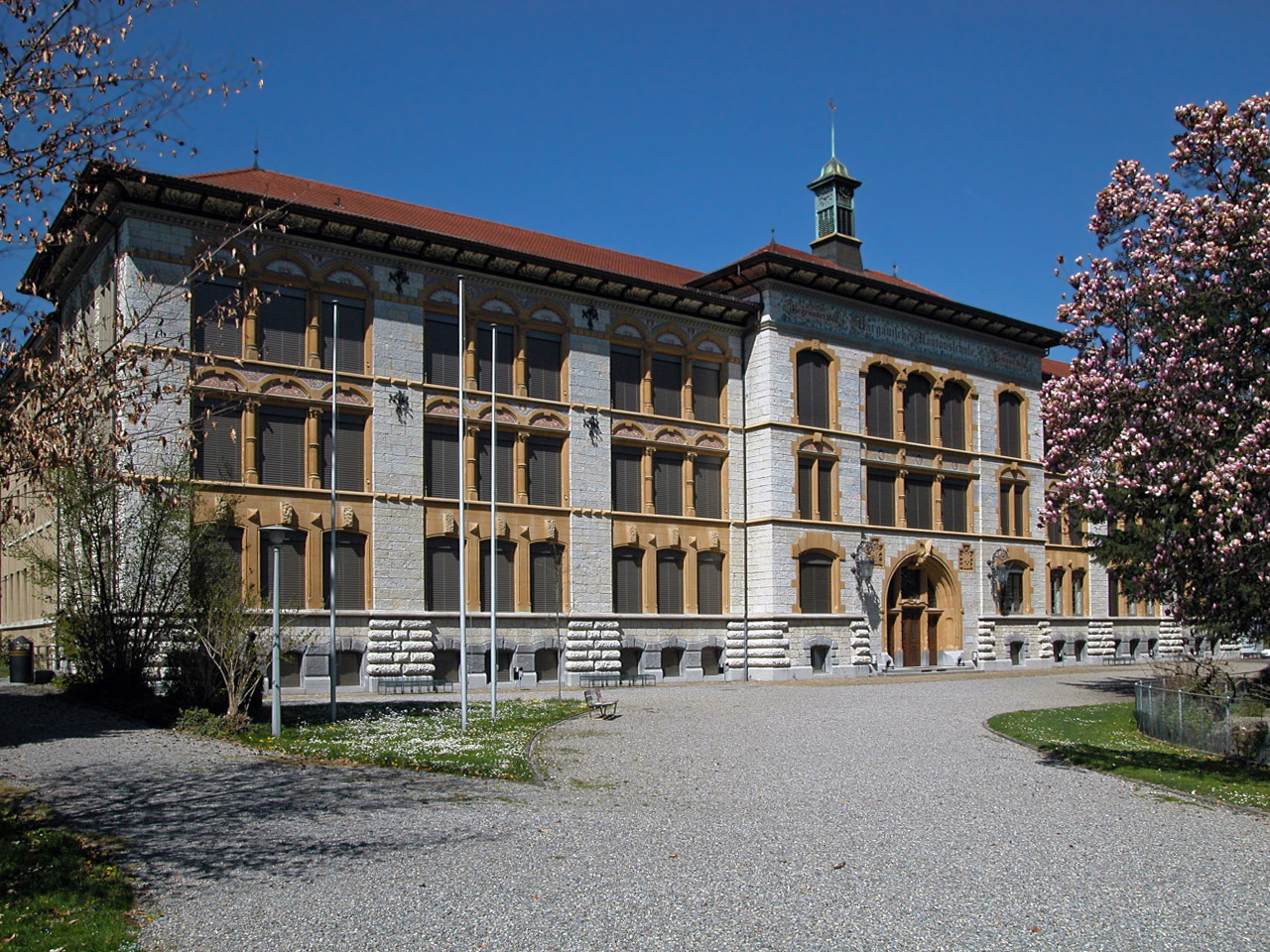
- Albert Einstein Building

The old cantonal school of Aarau (in German: AKSA, Alte Kantonsschule Aarau or Alte Kanti) was founded in 1802 and is the oldest non-church secondary school in Switzerland.

== History ==
From 1802 to 1896, the cantonal school was housed in what is now the Amthaus (today home of the cantonal police) on Laurenzenvorstadt. Johann Samuel von Gruner, the factory owner Johann Rudolf Meyer and the writer Andreas Moser, who created also Switzerland's first gymnasium here, were involved in its foundation. The founders were strongly influenced by the ideas of Johann Heinrich Pestalozzi. The school was non-denominational and saw itself as a reform school. The first director was Georg Franz Hofmann, the secretary of the Helvetic government. Until 1813 the school was private. Around 1896 the present Einstein House was inaugurated, it was later named after a former pupil of the school, the physicist Albert Einstein. In 1917 the extension to the Einstein House which now included an observatory was built. For a long time the school has had the reputation of being one of the best educational institutions in Switzerland. In 1969 the Karrerhaus was completed. In 2006 the rebuilt Karl-Moser-Haus was inaugurated. in 2008 the new Cafeteria was opened in the Frank building, where the library is also located. In 2014, 2020 and 2021 the Alte Kantonsschule Aarau received the School Prize of the Science Olympiad.

== Curriculum ==
=== Courses ===
The Old cantonal school of Aarau is a public secondary school in Aarau. There is a school for economics (WMS) and a school for computer science (IMS) next to the high school.

Each year there is a separate sports curriculum for professional athletes and an immersion class, in which the pupils are taught in German and English. Since 2006 there's also a NAWIMAT class, which prepares students for a job in science for example at the ETH. These classes are separate from the normal classes.

=== Languages ===
In addition to the mandatory languages German, English and French, students can also choose other languages to learn like Latin, Italian, Spanish, Greek, Russian, Hebrew and, since 2006, even Arabic. Since 2014, students can also take courses in Japanese and Chinese.

At the school the small and large Latinum, the Graecum, the Hebraicum as well as the Cambridge Advanced and the Proficiency can be taken.

=== Music ===
In addition to the option of taking lessons on various musical instruments, there is also a choir, an orchestra and numerous ensembles. In addition to the basic subject, a main subject in third grade and a supplementary subject in fourth grade are also offered.

=== Theatre ===
There is a drama course. The rehearsed plays are performed publicly roughly every 18 months.

=== Computer Science ===
Since 2003, keyboard writing was a compulsory subject at the high school as well as at the WMS, although the exams at the Gymnasium were less strict than at the WMS.

Since 2010, the school has been offering a computer science course (IMS) with a commercial vocational baccalaureate and a federal certificate of proficiency in "Computer Science / Application Development". The course consists of a three-year period of study in Aarau with a 5-week internship in the second year and a 4-week language course in the third year. The fourth year is intended as a practical year.

Since 2005 the school has been an authorised ECDL test centre, whereby ECDL diplomas can be acquired voluntarily at the high school, while the acquisition in the WMS is part of the curriculum.

Since 2017, computer science is also a compulsory subject for all high school students. In addition to the basics of programming in several programming languages, media competence is also taught.

=== Sports ===
Sports lessons are held at the Telli sports center, which is approximately 950 meters away by foot from the school.

There are many elective courses for example volleyball, Trampolin/ Air-track and football.
