= Bally (fashion house) =

Swiss fashion brand

Bally International SA

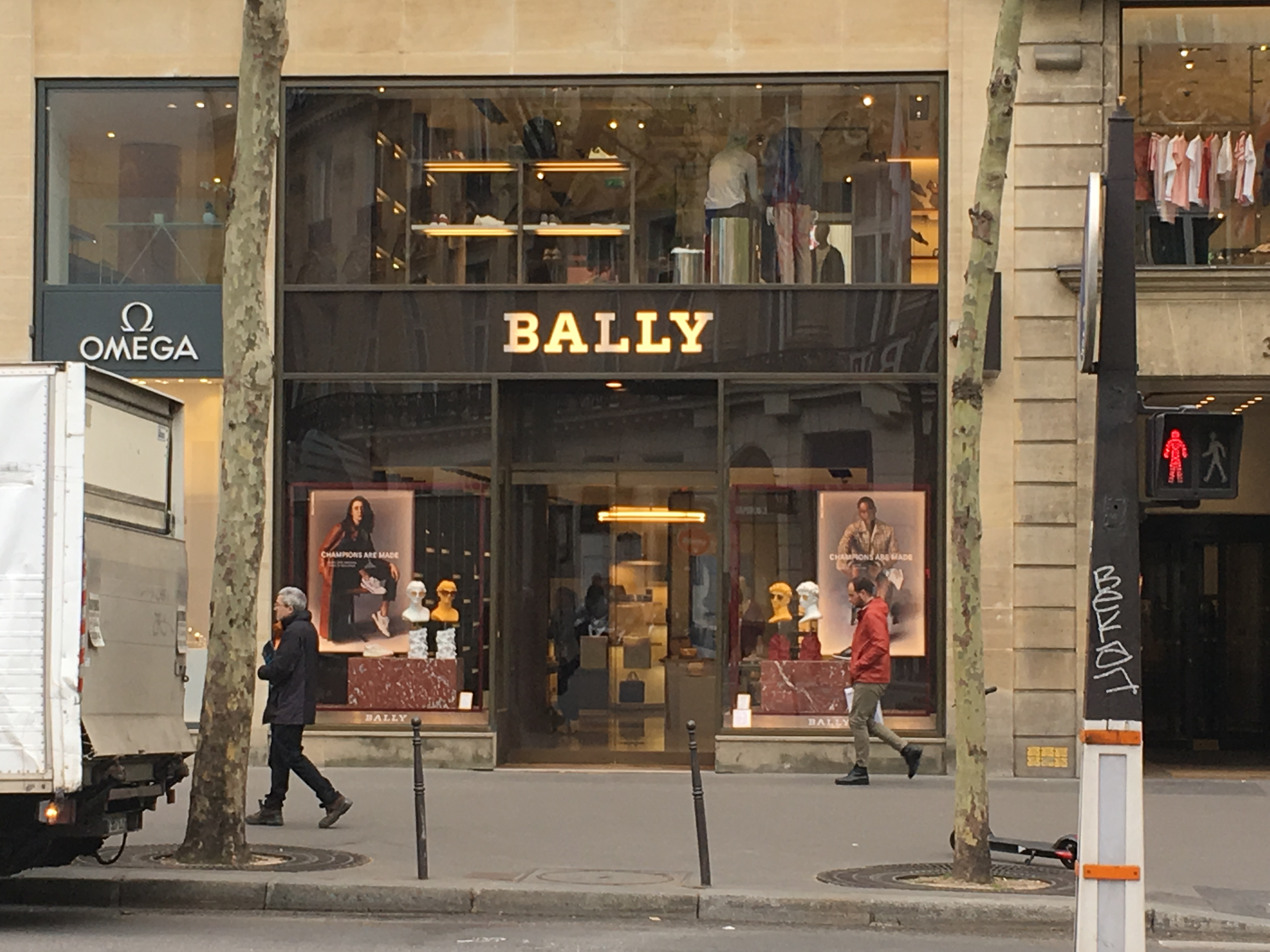
- Bally store, Paris
- Type: Private
- Industry: Fashion
- Founded: 1851; 175 years ago in Schönenwerd, Switzerland
- Founder: Carl Franz Bally; Fritz Bally
- Headquarters: Via Industria 1, Caslano 6987, Switzerland; 45.9701507°N 8.8766778°E
- Number of locations: 300+ boutiques
- Key people: Michael Reinstein (chairman)
- Products: Shoes; bags; accessories; ready-to-wear
- Revenue: $380 million (2021)
- Owner: Regent LP
- Number of employees: 1,500 (2024)
- Website: bally.com

Bally International Ltd. is a Swiss luxury fashion house and company founded in 1851 by brothers Fritz and Carl Franz Bally based in Caslano, Switzerland.

Traditionally the brand was most known for its shoes but has ever since also diversified into leather goods, bags, baggage, accessories and ready-to-wear. Bally's current creative director is Simone Bellotti, who succeeded Rhuigi Villaseñor, who was its creative director from 2022-2023.

It has been continuously owned and managed by the Bally family for six generations until 1999, when it was sold to TPG Inc., a private equity firm, based in San Francisco. In 2008, it was sold to Labelux Group (presently known as JAB Holding Company) which is ultimately owned by the German Reimann family. Since 2024, Bally has been owned by Regent, a California-based private equity firm.

== History ==
Previous logo

Bally was founded as a shoe making business in 1851 by Carl Franz Bally and his brother Fritz in the basement of their family home in Schönenwerd, Solothurn, Switzerland. Carl Franz Bally had joined the family business, a silk ribbon manufacturer, when he was 17, but decided to go into shoe manufacturing after a stay in Paris. After Carl's death in 1899, the company continued under the management of Carl's sons, Eduard and Arthur and continued to manufacture about two million pairs of shoes a year, employing 3,200 people.

== Modern era ==
From 1977 to 1999, Bally was owned by Oerlikon-Bührle. The brand first entered China in 1986, and the country has become its largest market since.

After plans for an initial public offering were called off in 1998, Texas Pacific Group acquired Bally from Oerlikon-Bührle. From 1999 to 2001, the company moved most of its activities from Schönenwerd to Caslano.

In 2008, Texas Pacific Group sold Bally International AG to Vienna-based Labelux Group, part of Joh A. Benckiser, for $596 million. JAB moved Bally's headquarters to London.

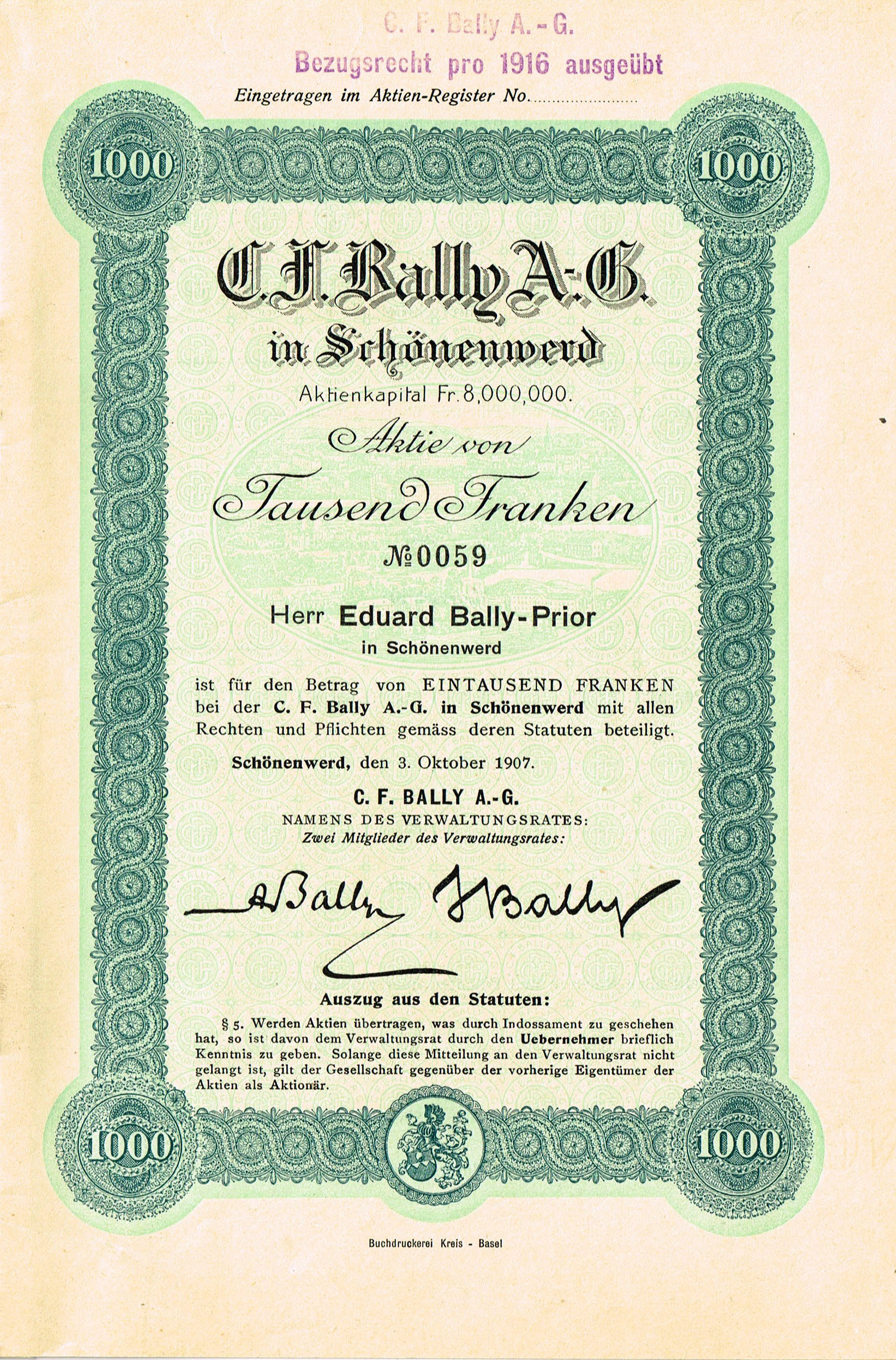
Share certificate of C. F. Bally AG, issued 3 October 1907

The company announced Frédéric de Narp, a former executive at Harry Winston, would become its chief executive officer in November 2013. During his tenure, de Narp worked with Pablo Coppola as design director (2014–2016), hired David Chipperfield to refurbish the brand's stores and put a bigger focus on womenswear. In 2015, Bally took over Italian leather goods company Zagliani's Milan atelier for its in-house production of high-end bags and accessories. From 2017, the company started to consolidate its operations in Milan and Caslano. That same year, the company also opened a new, 15,120 square feet manufacturing facility in Lastra a Signa.

In February 2018, owner JAB Holding Company agreed to sell a majority controlling stake to Chinese materials conglomerate Shandong Ruyi, at a reported $700 million. Bally was to become Shandong Ruyi’s first major acquisition in the European luxury accessories space, and JAB planned to retain a minority stake. However, the sale agreement between JAB Holdings and Shandong Ruyi failed to materialize after the latter didn't manage to secure financing by 2020, more than two years after the deal was announced.

Instead of seeking a new buyer, JAB decided to reinvest. In May 2019, Bally appointed its COO Nicolas Girotto, who joined the company in October 2015 and sat on the brand's board of directors and executive committee, as new CEO. In January 2022, Rhuigi Villaseñor was appointed as creative director. Rhuigi was previously founder, CEO, and creative director of the luxury streetwear brand Rhude. In May 2023, after only two collections, Bally and Villaseñor jointly announced his departure from the brand.

Two weeks after the announcement of Villaseñor's departure, Simone Belloti was appointed as design director. In 2024, Bally worked with actor Adrien Brody on a travel collection.

California-based private equity firm Regent acquired Bally in August 2024. In 2025, Girotto exited the brand, succeeded by Ennio Fontana.

== Boutiques ==
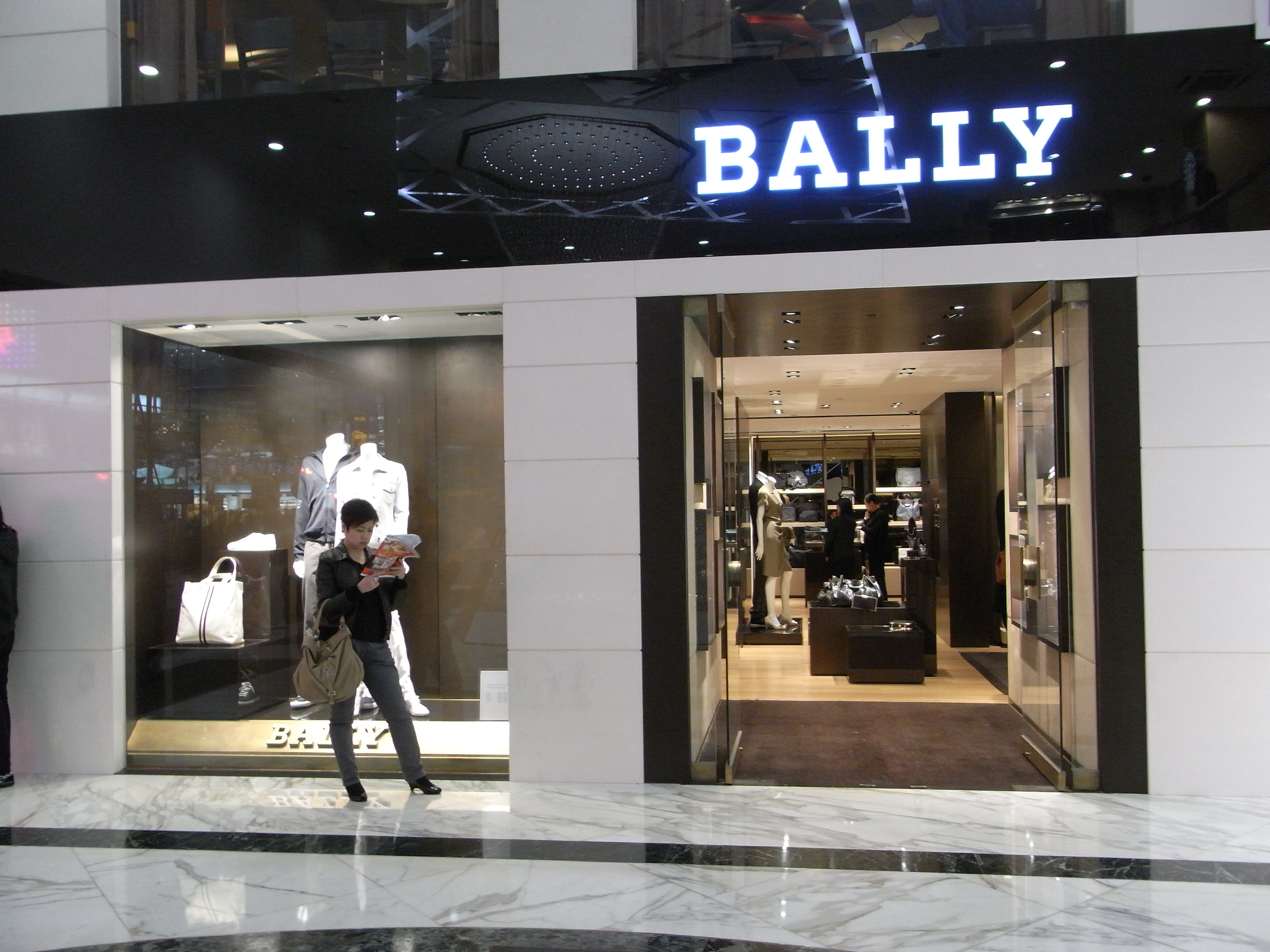
Bally store in Hong Kong

As of 2024, Bally's retail network included 320 boutiques, with 500 multi-brand points of sale spanning 66 countries.

== Advertising ==
For its advertising campaigns, Bally has been working with photographers including Alasdair McLellan (2023). Its campaigns have featured Tiffany Tang (2017), Deng Lun (2019), Huang Jingyu (2021) and Roy Wang (2023).
