= Cantonal Council of Solothurn =

Legislature of the canton of Solothurn, Switzerland

Cantonal Council of Solothurn Kantonsrat Solothurn

Type
- Type: Unicameral

Leadership
- President: Myriam Frey Schär, GRÜNE

Structure
- Seats: 100
- Political groups: SVP (25) SP (21) The Centre (20) FDP (20) Greens (9) GLP (4) EVP (1)

Elections
- Last election: 9 March 2025

The Cantonal Council of Solothurn (German: Solothurner Kantonsrat) is the legislature of the canton of Solothurn, in Switzerland. Solothurn has a unicameral legislature. The Cantonal Council has 100 seats, with members elected every four years.

In the 7 March 2009 election, the centre-right maintained its dominance of the Cantonal Council. FDP.The Liberals lost three seats, but remained the largest party, with 27 seats. The Christian Democrats added two seats, becoming the second-largest party, on 24 seats. The Social Democrats lost ground, falling three seats to 21 overall, whilst the Swiss People's Party gained one seat to 18. The left-wing Green Party and centre-right Green Liberal Party also gained two seats apiece.

Summary of the 7 March 2021 Solothurn Cantonal Council election results
Party	Ideology	Vote %	Vote % ±	Seats	Seats ±
FDP.The Liberals	Classical liberalism	22.7	–1.9	22	–4
Swiss People's Party	National conservatism	21.0	+1.3	21	+3
Social Democratic Party	Social democracy	19.3	–2.3	20	–3
Christian Democratic People's Party	Christian democracy	17.6	–1.3	20	±0
Green Party	Green politics	10.3	+2.8	10	+3
Green Liberal Party	Green liberalism	7.0	+2.8	6	+3
Evangelical People's Party	Christian democracy	1.9	+0.8	1	±0
Swiss Democrats	Swiss nationalism	0.2	N/A	0	N/A
Total		100.00	–	100	–
Source: Canton of Solothurn
