= Schönenwerd =

- Municipality
- Coat of arms
- Location of Schönenwerd
- Location within Switzerland Location within Canton of Solothurn
- Coordinates: 47°22′N 8°0′E
- Country: Switzerland
- Canton: Solothurn
- District: Olten

Area
  - Total: 3.73 km^{2} (1.44 sq mi)
- Elevation: 386 m (1,266 ft)

Population (December 2020)
  - Total: 5,057
  - Density: 1,360/km^{2} (3,510/sq mi)
- Time zone: UTC+01:00 (CET)
  - Summer (DST): UTC+02:00 (CEST)
- Postal code: 5012
- SFOS number: 2583
- ISO 3166 code: CH-SO
- Surrounded by: Eppenberg-Wöschnau, Gretzenbach, Niedererlinsbach, Niedergösgen, Oberentfelden (AG), Unterentfelden (AG)
- Website: schoenenwerd.ch

Schönenwerd is a municipality in the district of Olten in the canton of Solothurn in Switzerland.

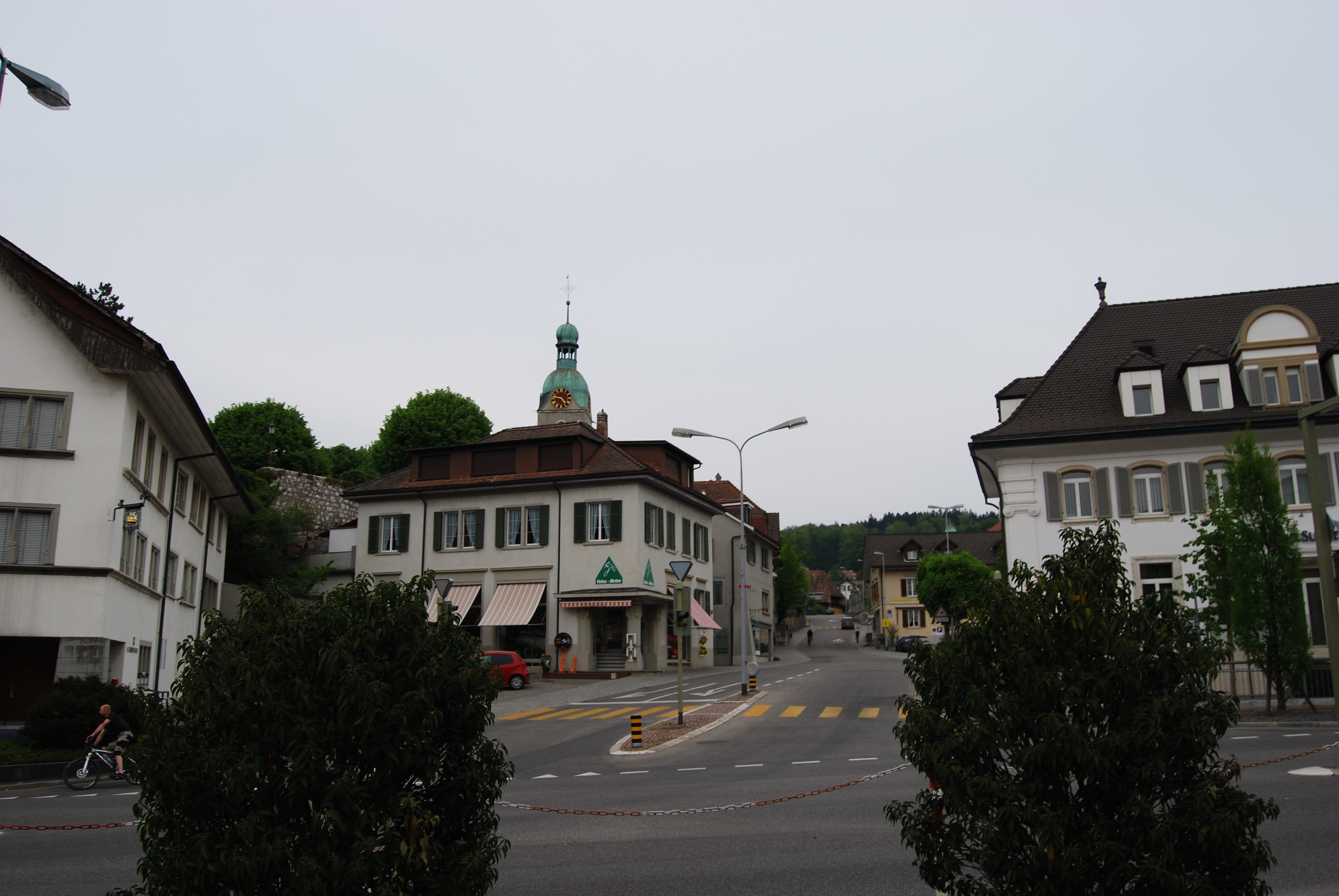
Schönenwerd

== History ==
Schönenwerd is first mentioned in 778 as Werith.

== Geography ==
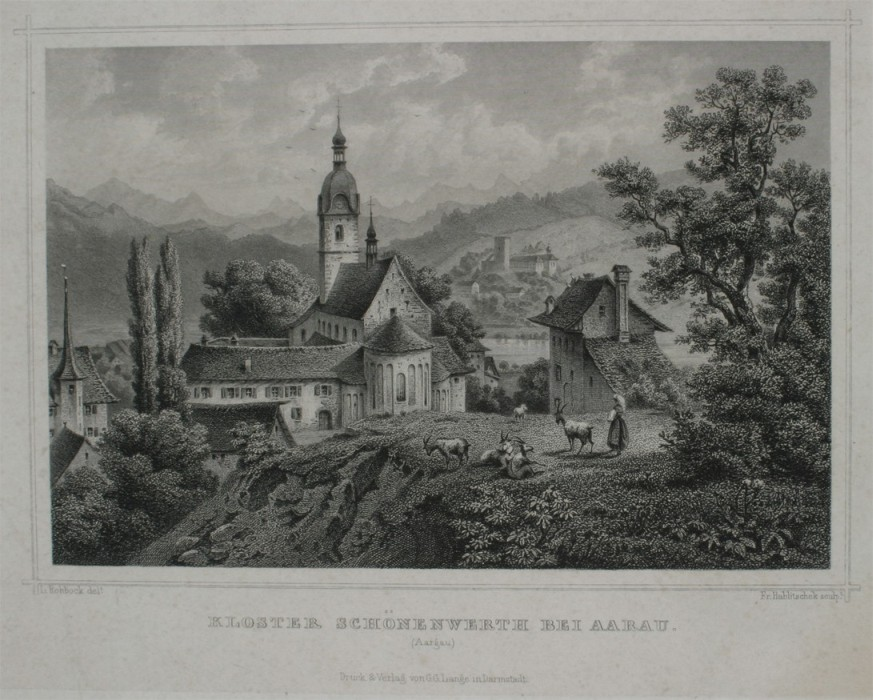
Schönenwerd Abbey (1850)

Aerial view (1948)

Schönenwerd has an area, as of 2009, of 3.73 square kilometers (1.44 sq mi). Of this area, 0.39 km^{2} (0.15 sq mi) or 10.5% is used for agricultural purposes, while 1.61 km^{2} (0.62 sq mi) or 43.2% is forested. Of the rest of the land, 1.55 km^{2} (0.60 sq mi) or 41.6% is settled (buildings or roads), 0.18 km^{2} (0.069 sq mi) or 4.8% is either rivers or lakes and 0.01 km^{2} (2.5 acres) or 0.3% is unproductive land.

Of the built up area, industrial buildings made up 4.8% of the total area while housing and buildings made up 20.6% and transportation infrastructure made up 9.7%. Power and water infrastructure as well as other special developed areas made up 2.1% of the area while parks, green belts and sports fields made up 4.3%. Out of the forested land, all of the forested land area is covered with heavy forests. Of the agricultural land, 4.6% is used for growing crops and 5.6% is pastures. Of the water in the municipality, 0.5% is in lakes and 4.3% is in rivers and streams.

The municipality is located in the Olten district. The village stretches from the collegiate church of St. Leodegar on a hill down toward the Aare river.

== Coat of arms ==
The blazon of the municipal coat of arms is Tierced per fess Gules, Argent and Sable overall a Fleur de lis counterchanged Argent, Gules and Argent.

== Demographics ==
Schönenwerd has a population (as of December 2020) of 5,057. As of 2008, 35.8% of the population are resident foreign nationals. Over the last 10 years (1999–2009 ) the population has changed at a rate of -1.2%.

Most of the population (as of 2000) speaks German (3,704 or 77.8%), with Italian being second most common (439 or 9.2%) and Serbo-Croatian being third (123 or 2.6%). There are 50 people who speak French and 7 people who speak Romansh.

As of 2008, the gender distribution of the population was 50.0% male and 50.0% female. The population was made up of 1,415 Swiss men (29.6% of the population) and 978 (20.4%) non-Swiss men. There were 1,597 Swiss women (33.4%) and 797 (16.6%) non-Swiss women. Of the population in the municipality 1,097 or about 23.0% were born in Schönenwerd and lived there in 2000. There were 740 or 15.5% who were born in the same canton, while 1,454 or 30.5% were born somewhere else in Switzerland, and 1,321 or 27.7% were born outside of Switzerland.

In 2008 there were 23 live births to Swiss citizens and 21 births to non-Swiss citizens, and in same time span there were 42 deaths of Swiss citizens and 2 non-Swiss citizen deaths. Ignoring immigration and emigration, the population of Swiss citizens decreased by 19 while the foreign population increased by 19. There were 6 Swiss men and 2 Swiss women who immigrated back to Switzerland. At the same time, there were 35 non-Swiss men and 10 non-Swiss women who immigrated from another country to Switzerland. The total Swiss population change in 2008 (from all sources, including moves across municipal borders) was a decrease of 18 and the non-Swiss population increased by 69 people. This represents a population growth rate of 1.1%.

The age distribution, as of 2000, in Schönenwerd is; 310 children or 6.5% of the population are between 0 and 6 years old and 808 teenagers or 17.0% are between 7 and 19. Of the adult population, 282 people or 5.9% of the population are between 20 and 24 years old. 1,425 people or 29.9% are between 25 and 44, and 1,146 people or 24.1% are between 45 and 64. The senior population distribution is 545 people or 11.4% of the population are between 65 and 79 years old and there are 245 people or 5.1% who are over 80.

As of 2000, there were 1,882 people who were single and never married in the municipality. There were 2,336 married individuals, 315 widows or widowers and 228 individuals who are divorced.

As of 2000, there were 1,980 private households in the municipality, and an average of 2.3 persons per household. There were 632 households that consist of only one person and 125 households with five or more people. Out of a total of 2,015 households that answered this question, 31.4% were households made up of just one person and there were 20 adults who lived with their parents. Of the rest of the households, there are 563 married couples without children, 638 married couples with children There were 105 single parents with a child or children. There were 22 households that were made up of unrelated people and 35 households that were made up of some sort of institution or another collective housing.

In 2000 there were 634 single family homes (or 63.0% of the total) out of a total of 1,007 inhabited buildings. There were 246 multi-family buildings (24.4%), along with 77 multi-purpose buildings that were mostly used for housing (7.6%) and 50 other use buildings (commercial or industrial) that also had some housing (5.0%). Of the single family homes 104 were built before 1919, while 46 were built between 1990 and 2000. The greatest number of single family homes (172) were built between 1919 and 1945.

In 2000 there were 2,143 apartments in the municipality. The most common apartment size was 4 rooms of which there were 684. There were 101 single room apartments and 602 apartments with five or more rooms. Of these apartments, a total of 1,938 apartments (90.4% of the total) were permanently occupied, while 90 apartments (4.2%) were seasonally occupied and 115 apartments (5.4%) were empty. As of 2009, the construction rate of new housing units was 1.7 new units per 1000 residents. The vacancy rate for the municipality, in 2010, was 2.82%.

The historical population is given in the following chart:

== Heritage sites of national significance ==
The Bally Areal, the Christian Catholic collegiate church of St. Leodegar and the Granary im Ballypark are listed as Swiss heritage sites of national significance. The entire village of Schönenwerd is part of the Inventory of Swiss Heritage Sites.

== Politics ==
In the 2007 federal election the most popular party was the SVP which received 37.34% of the vote. The next three most popular parties were the FDP (18.71%), the SP (17.49%) and the CVP (13.97%). In the federal election, a total of 1,218 votes were cast, and the voter turnout was 47.6%.

== Economy ==
As of 2010, Schönenwerd had an unemployment rate of 4.5%. As of 2008, there were 7 people employed in the primary economic sector and about 2 businesses involved in this sector. 781 people were employed in the secondary sector and there were 64 businesses in this sector. 1,326 people were employed in the tertiary sector, with 209 businesses in this sector. There were 2,439 residents of the municipality who were employed in some capacity, of which females made up 43.4% of the workforce.

In 2008 the total number of full-time equivalent jobs was 1,637. The number of jobs in the primary sector was 5, all of which were in agriculture. The number of jobs in the secondary sector was 701 of which 257 or (36.7%) were in manufacturing and 412 (58.8%) were in construction. The number of jobs in the tertiary sector was 931. In the tertiary sector; 319 or 34.3% were in wholesale or retail sales or the repair of motor vehicles, 34 or 3.7% were in the movement and storage of goods, 59 or 6.3% were in a hotel or restaurant, 12 or 1.3% were in the information industry, 43 or 4.6% were the insurance or financial industry, 112 or 12.0% were technical professionals or scientists, 70 or 7.5% were in education and 121 or 13.0% were in health care.

In 2000, there were 1,318 workers who commuted into the municipality and 1,768 workers who commuted away. The municipality is a net exporter of workers, with about 1.3 workers leaving the municipality for every one entering. Of the working population, 23.6% used public transportation to get to work, and 51.4% used a private car.

== Religion ==
From the 2000 census, 1,833 or 38.5% were Roman Catholic, while 1,364 or 28.6% belonged to the Swiss Reformed Church. Of the rest of the population, there were 184 members of an Orthodox church (or about 3.86% of the population), there were 49 individuals (or about 1.03% of the population) who belonged to the Christian Catholic Church, and there were 151 individuals (or about 3.17% of the population) who belonged to another Christian church. There were 366 (or about 7.69% of the population) who were Islamic. There were 13 individuals who were Buddhist, 18 individuals who were Hindu and 4 individuals who belonged to another church. 592 (or about 12.43% of the population) belonged to no church, are agnostic or atheist, and 187 individuals (or about 3.93% of the population) did not answer the question.

== Transport ==
Schönenwerd sits on the Olten–Aarau line and is served by trains at Schönenwerd railway station.

== Education ==
In Schönenwerd about 1,605 or (33.7%) of the population have completed non-mandatory upper secondary education, and 414 or (8.7%) have completed additional higher education (either university or a Fachhochschule). Of the 414 who completed tertiary schooling, 62.1% were Swiss men, 19.1% were Swiss women, 11.4% were non-Swiss men and 7.5% were non-Swiss women.

During the 2010–2011 school year there were a total of 180 students in the Schönenwerd school system. The education system in the Canton of Solothurn allows young children to attend two years of non-obligatory Kindergarten. During that school year, there were children in kindergarten. The canton's school system requires students to attend six years of primary school, with some of the children attending smaller, specialized classes. In the municipality there were students in primary school. The secondary school program consists of three lower, obligatory years of schooling, followed by three to five years of optional, advanced schools. 180 lower secondary students attend school in Schönenwerd.

As of 2000, there were 193 students in Schönenwerd who came from another municipality, while 122 residents attended schools outside the municipality.

SIS Swiss International School Schönenwerd is in the city.
