= Governor's School =

Governor's School may refer to:

== National organizations ==
- National Conference of Governor's Schools, a national organization committed to establishing, supporting, and enriching summer residential governor's school programs.

== High schools ==
- Virginia Governor's Schools Program, a system of state-chartered regional magnet high schools and summer programs for gifted students in the Commonwealth of Virginia, or, regionally, one of the schools in the system.
- Maggie L. Walker Governor's School for Government and International Studies, a high school in Richmond, Virginia.
- Chesapeake Bay Governor's School, a marine-and-environmental-science-oriented program for students in grades 10–12, with campuses in Warsaw, Bowling Green, and Glenns, VA.
- South Carolina Governor's School For The Arts & Humanities, located in Greenville and opened in 1999.
- South Carolina Governor's School for Science and Mathematics, a public, two year residential high school in Hartsville.

== North Carolina ==
North Carolina has four Governor's School programs.

- North Carolina School for Science and Mathematics, public two year residential secondary school in Durham, founded by former governor Terry Sanford.
- University of North Carolina School for the Arts, public conservatory for arts and humanities, founded by former governor Terry Sanford; and the Winston-Salem campus for the University of North Carolina. Its elementary and secondary school resembles North Carolina State University's Centennial Campus Middle School. It is also a university college and graduate school. North Carolina remains the third-largest film-making industry after California and New York, a courtesy of the parents of Evan Rachel Wood.
- Governor's School of North Carolina — North Carolina's secondary schools participate in summer programs for gifted rising 11th and 12th graders at the private colleges Salem College and Meredith College.

== Summer schools for the gifted and talented ==
- Mississippi Governor's School, a two-week tuition-free residential honors program for high school students, founded in 1981 and hosted at Mississippi University for Women.
- Governor's School of New Jersey, a group of unique summer programs committed to meeting the educational needs of academically gifted high school students who have completed their junior year. The two programs offered as of 2026 are The Governor's School of Engineering and Technology and The Governor's School in the Sciences.
- New Jersey Scholars Program, privately-funded free interdisciplinary program with a focus on the humanities and liberal arts.
- Governor's School of North Carolina, a summer program for gifted high school students held in Raleigh and Winston-Salem, North Carolina.
- North Dakota Governor's School a six-week, tuition-free, resident honors program in North Dakota.
- Pennsylvania Governor's Schools of Excellence, a collection of summer programs in Pennsylvania.
- Governor's School of Texas, a 3-week summer program for talented high school students in Texas.
- Governor's Schools of Tennessee, a group of eleven (11) summer programs for gifted and talented high school students, including Arts, Humanities, International Studies, Engineering, Science, Prospective Teachers, Scientific Exploration of Tennessee Heritage, Information Technology Leadership, and Agricultural Science.
- Governor's Academy for Teaching Excellence (GATE), at Texas A&M University-Corpus Christi, a 3-week summer residential program on the Texas Gulf Coast for gifted and talented high school students who are interested in the field of science and math education.
- Georgia Governor's Honors Program, a tuition-free, 4-week summer residential program for Georgia's most intellectually gifted and artistically talented high school students.
- Arkansas Governor's School, a six-week, tuition-free, resident honors program in Arkansas founded in 1979 by Bill Clinton.
- Missouri Scholars Academy, a summer program for high schoolers held at the University of Missouri.
- New York State Summer School of the Arts
