= National Conference of Governor's Schools =

The National Conference of Governor's Schools (NCoGS) is a United States national organization committed to establishing, supporting, and enriching summer residential governor's school programs. Its members are individuals involved in maintaining governor's school programs across the country, including administrators, statewide co-ordinators, faculty and staff members, alumni, parents and other friends of state-sponsored summer residential enrichment programs for gifted and talented youth.

== List of members ==
- Alabama Governor's School
- Arkansas Governor's School
- California State Summer School for the Arts
- University of Delaware Governor's School for Excellence
- Florida Governor's School for Space Science and Technology
- Georgia Governor's Honors Program
- Iowa Governor's Institute
- Kentucky Center Governor's School for the Arts
- Kentucky Governor's Scholars Program
- Kentucky Governor’s School for Entrepreneurs
- Louisiana Governor's Program for Gifted Children
- Mississippi Governor's School
- Missouri Fine Arts Academy
- Missouri Scholars Academy
- Governor's School of New Jersey (2 programs)
- New York State Summer School of the Arts
- Governor's School of North Carolina
- North Dakota Governor's School
- Pennsylvania Governor's School for Global Entrepreneurship
- Pennsylvania Governor's School for the Sciences
- University of Pittsburgh Health Career Scholars Academy
- Governor's School of South Carolina
- South Carolina Governor's School for the Arts and Humanities
- South Carolina Governor's School for Science and Mathematics
- South Dakota Governor's Camp
- Tennessee Governor's Schools (12 programs)
- Governor's School of Texas
- The Governor's Institutes of Vermont
- Virginia Summer Residential Governor's Schools
- Governor's Schools of West Virginia
- Wyoming Summer High School Institute
