= Rose Bud High School =

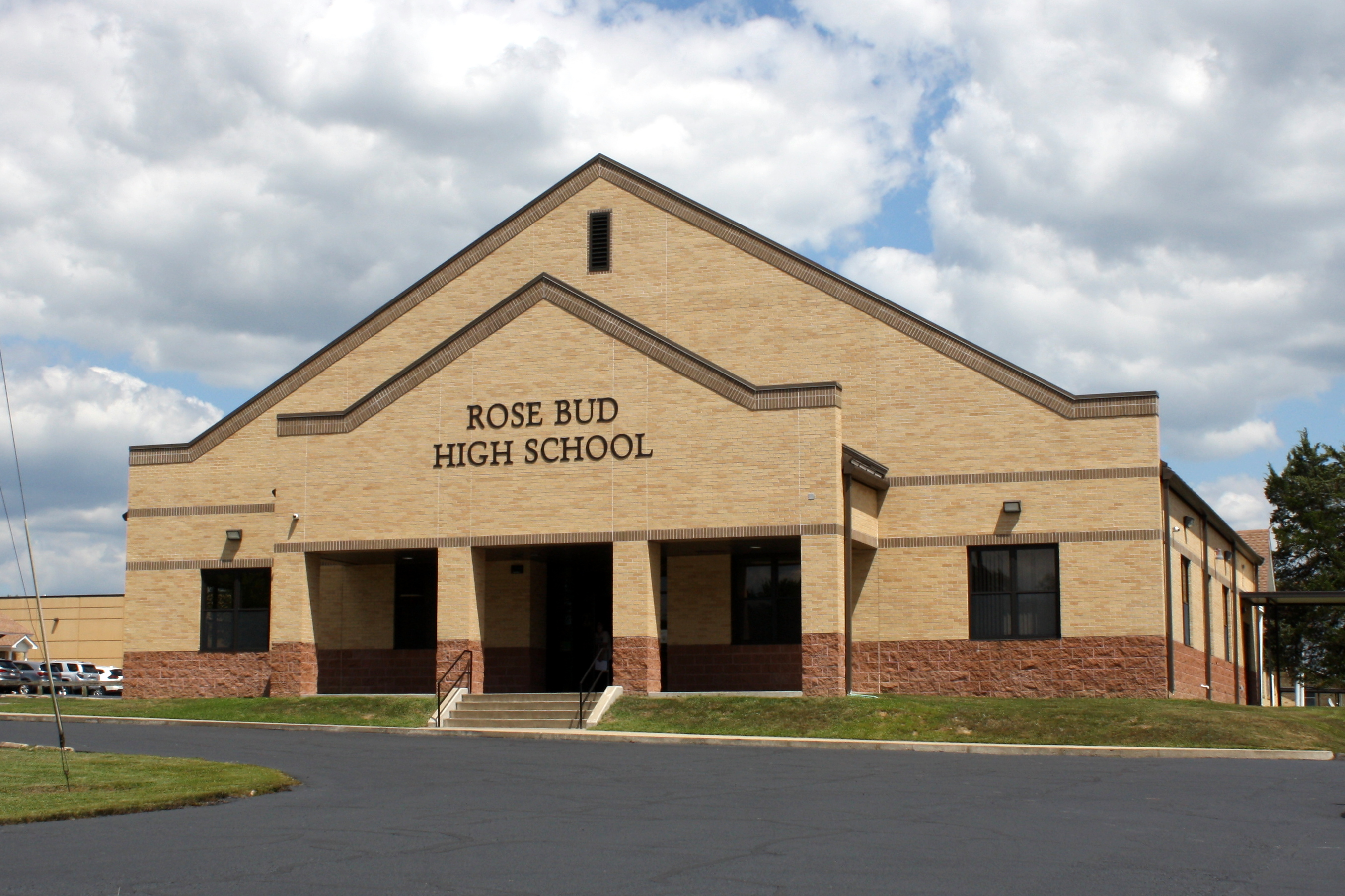
- Rose Bud High School

Location
- 124 School Road; Rose Bud, Arkansas 72137; United States
- Coordinates: 35°20′2″N 92°4′15″W

Information
- Status: Open
- School district: Rose Bud School District
- Oversight: Arkansas Department of Education (ADE)
- CEEB code: 042180
- NCES School ID: 051200000962
- Grades: 7–12
- Enrollment: 340 (2023–2024)
- Student to teacher ratio: 5.88
- Education system: ADE Smart Core curriculum
- Classes offered: Regular, Advanced Placement
- Campus type: Rural
- Colors: Red and white
- Athletics conference: 3A Region 2 (2012–14)
- Mascot: Rambler
- Team name: Rose Bud Ramblers
- Accreditation: Arkansas Department of Education
- Affiliation: Arkansas Activities Association (AAA)
- Website: www.rosebudschools.com

Rose Bud High School is a comprehensive public high school serving the rural, distant town of Rose Bud, Arkansas, United States. Located in White County, Rose Bud High School is the sole high school managed by the Rose Bud School District and serves students in grades seven through twelve.

== Curriculum ==
The assumed course of study at Rose Bud High School is the Smart Core curriculum developed by the Arkansas Department of Education (ADE). Students engage in regular and Advanced Placement (AP) coursework and exams to obtain at least 22 units before graduation. Exceptional students have been recognized as National Merit Finalists and participated in Arkansas Governor's School.

== Athletics ==
The Rose Bud High School mascot is the Rambler with red and white serving as the school colors.

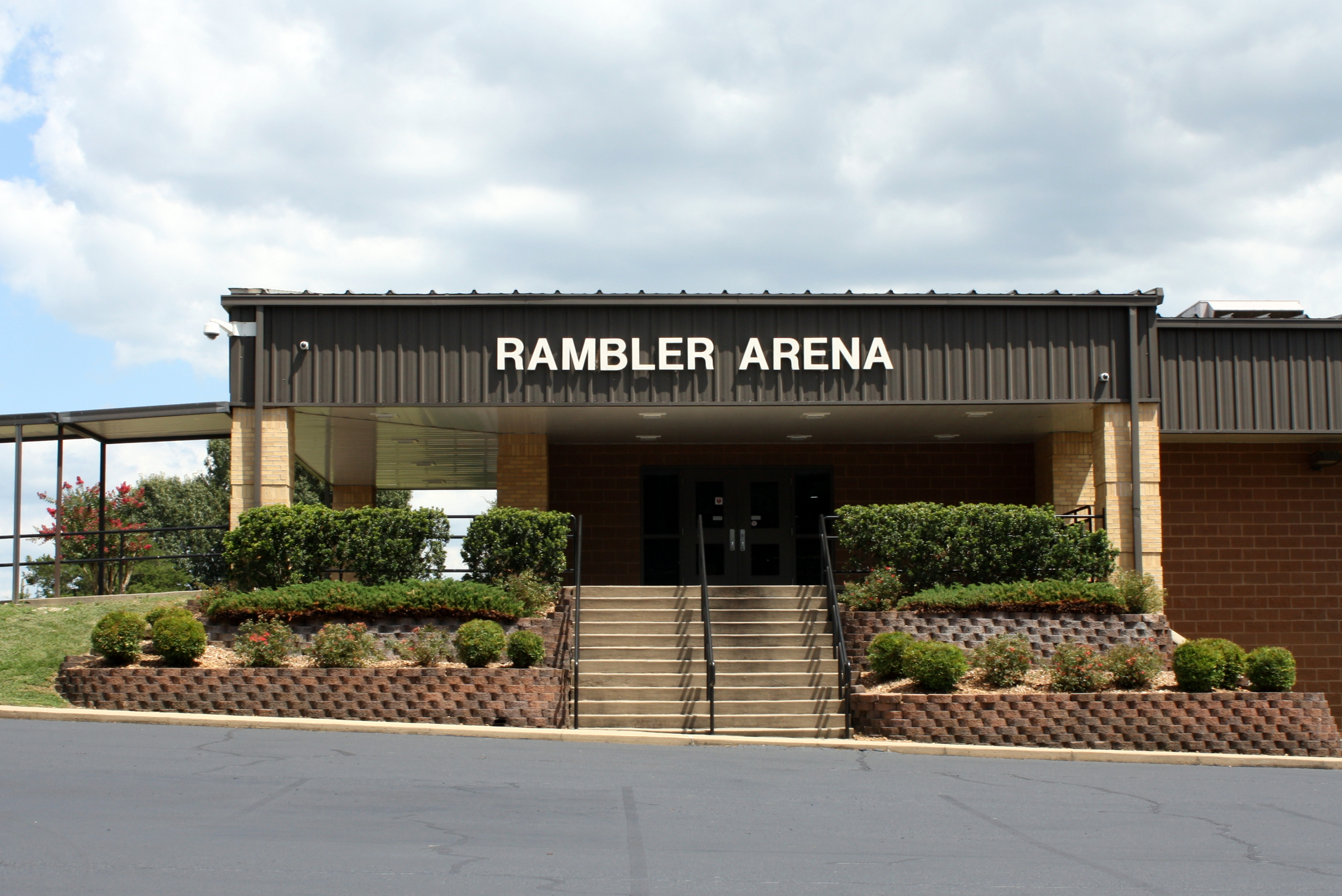
Rambler Arena

For the 2012–2014 seasons, the Rose Bud Ramblers participate in the state's fifth largest classification (3A) within the combined 3A Region 2 Conference. Competition is primarily sanctioned by the Arkansas Activities Association with the Ramblers competing in baseball, basketball (boys/girls), competitive cheer, cross country, dance, football, golf (boys/girls), softball, girls), track and field, and volleyball.
