= Bennett Miller =

American film director (born 1966)

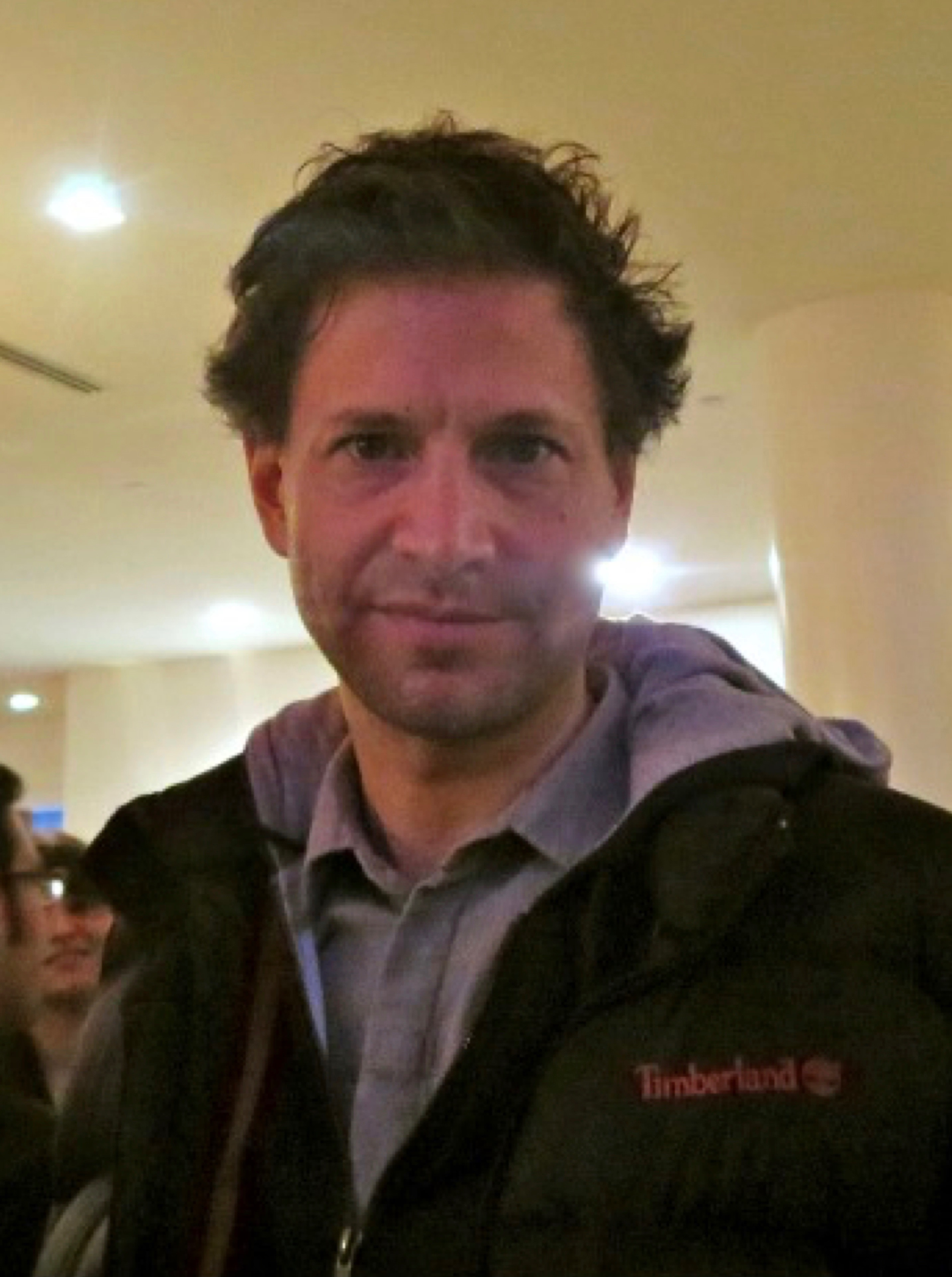
- Miller at the Weekend of a Champion press conference in November, 2013
- Born: Bennett Altman Miller; December 30, 1966 (age 59); New York City, U.S.
- Education: New York University Tisch School of the Arts
- Occupations: Film director, film producer
- Years active: 1998–present

Bennett Altman Miller (born December 30, 1966) is an American film director who is known for having directed the films Capote (2005), Moneyball (2011), and Foxcatcher (2014). He has been nominated twice for the Academy Award for Best Director.

== Early life and education ==
Miller was born in New York City to an engineer father and a painter mother. In his youth he knew writer Dan Futterman and actor Philip Seymour Hoffman. He and Futterman were classmates at Mamaroneck High School, and all three participated in the New York State Summer School of the Arts. The three later collaborated on Capote.

Miller attended New York University's Tisch School of the Arts, with Hoffman again as a classmate, but dropped out shortly before he would have graduated.

While attending NYU, Miller was a founding member of the short-lived Bullstoi Ensemble theater company along with Hoffman and fellow actor Steven Schub. It was during this time that Miller, Hoffman, and Schub made a pact that if any of them ever won an Academy Award, their entire acceptance speech would consist of nothing but barking.

== Career ==
Miller made his feature directorial debut with the 1998 documentary The Cruise, a black-and-white portrait of New York City bus tour guide Timothy "Speed" Levitch. The film was shot using MiniDV equipment and later described as an example of late-1990s digital independent filmmaking. As described by Wheeler Winston Dixon the film was made using handheld digital cameras. The film received positive critical attention and helped establish Miller as an independent filmmaker.

Miller turned down several offers of film projects, until he was able to get support to make the film Capote with Philip Seymour Hoffman, who played Truman Capote. The film premiered in September 2005 at the Telluride Film Festival and was released by Sony Pictures Classics.

In 2006 Miller directed the Bob Dylan music video When the Deal Goes Down starring Scarlett Johansson. Then, in 2008 he directed Johansson's music video for her Tom Waits cover of Falling Down featuring an appearance by Salman Rushdie.

In 2009, Miller was hired by Columbia Pictures to direct the film Moneyball, based on the 2003 book of the same name by Michael Lewis, after its previously-hired director, Steven Soderbergh, clashed with producers over the tone of the film. The resulting film, released in 2011, was a critical and commercial success.

Miller's most recent film is Foxcatcher (2014), starring Steve Carell, Channing Tatum and Mark Ruffalo, a film he began developing in 2006. The film, produced by Annapurna Pictures and released by Sony Pictures Classics, became a critical success. In his review for Rolling Stone, Peter Travers called the film "a new peak" for Miller, who "takes a scalpel to the privileged worlds of Olympic sports and inherited wealth." It was nominated for five Academy Awards, including Best Director (Miller), Best Actor (Carell), Best Supporting Actor (Ruffalo), and Best Original Screenplay (E. Max Frye and Dan Futterman).

Miller has directed six performers to Academy Award nominations: Philip Seymour Hoffman and Catherine Keener for Capote, Brad Pitt and Jonah Hill for Moneyball, and Steve Carell and Mark Ruffalo for Foxcatcher. Hoffman won the Oscar for his work in Capote.

After Foxcatcher, Miller began developing a documentary about technological change and artificial intelligence's impact of on society. The project was announced to be featuring contributions by academics and experts in the field such as Danny Hillis, Ray Kurzweil, Kevin Esvelt and Sherry Turkle. While working on a documentary, Miller was among the first to receive access to DALL-E—an AI image-generation tool—granted by Sam Altman. Following several years of research and filming on the subject, in 2023, Gagosian presented an exhibition of Miller's AI-generated prints made using DALL-E.

== Filmography ==
Year	Title	Director	Producer	Writer	Notes
1998	The Cruise	Yes	Yes	Yes	Documentary
2005	Capote	Yes	No	No	
2011	Moneyball	Yes	No	No	
2014	Foxcatcher	Yes	Yes	No	
TBA	Untitled film	Yes	Yes	Yes	Documentary

== Accolades ==
Year	Award	Category	Title of project	Result
2006	Academy Award	Best Director	Capote	Nominated
2015	Academy Award	Best Director	Foxcatcher	Nominated
2006	British Academy Film Award	Best Director	Capote	Nominated
2006	Directors Guild of America Awards	Best Director - Feature Film	Capote	Nominated
2015	Producers Guild of America Awards	Outstanding Producer - Feature Film	Foxcatcher	Nominated
2015	Independent Spirit Award	Special Distinction Award	Foxcatcher	Won
2014	Cannes Film Festival	Palme d'Or	Foxcatcher	Nominated
2014	Cannes Film Festival	Best Director	Foxcatcher	Won

Miller was nominated for the Academy Award for Best Director for Capote (2005) and Foxcatcher (2014). He was also nominated for the David Lean Award for Direction at the BAFTAs in 2006.

He won the Best Director Award (French: Prix de la mise en scène) at the 2014 Cannes Film Festival for Foxcatcher, which was also part of the main competition for the Palme d'Or.

Accolades for Miller's feature motion pictures
Year	Feature Motion Picture	Academy Awards		BAFTAs		Golden Globes	
Year	Feature Motion Picture	Nominations	Wins	Nominations	Wins	Nominations	Wins
2005	Capote	5	1	5	1	1	1
2011	Moneyball	6		3		4	
2014	Foxcatcher	5		2		3	
Total		16	1	10	1	8	1

Directed Academy Award performances

Under Miller's direction, these actors have received Academy Award nominations (and one win) for their performances in their respective roles.

Year	Performer	Film	Result
Academy Award for Best Actor
2006	Philip Seymour Hoffman	Capote	Won
2012	Brad Pitt	Moneyball	Nominated
2015	Steve Carell	Foxcatcher	Nominated
Academy Award for Best Supporting Actor
2012	Jonah Hill	Moneyball	Nominated
2015	Mark Ruffalo	Foxcatcher	Nominated
Academy Award for Best Supporting Actress
2006	Catherine Keener	Capote	Nominated
