= RBSD =

RBSD may mean:

- Rosendale-Brandon School District, Wisconsin
- Rose Bud School District, Arkansas
- Reality-Based Self-Defense
- Robert Busch School of Design, a school of Kean University
