= New York State Summer School of the Arts =

Summer residential arts programs

NYSSSA Logo

The New York State Summer School of the Arts (NYSSSA) is a series of summer residential programs for New York State high school students. Open to all New York State high school–age students who qualify through audition, it provides intensive pre-professional training. Three component schools offer training in the specific disciplines of media arts, theatre, and visual arts.

In 2020 and 2021, in response to the COVID-19 pandemic, NYSSSA offered tuition-free virtual programs for young art students in each of the seven disciplines. In 2022 and 2023, the New York State Department of Education put the programs on hold.

In February 2024, the New York State Department of Education announced that it would relaunch three of the seven programs (visual arts, media arts, theatre) for three weeks. The summer residencies were held at SUNY Fredonia.

Application details, deadlines and forms for 2024 NYSSSA programs, called "NYSSSA In-Residency Programs" are posted online by the NYS Department of Education Office of Cultural Education.

== Schools ==
=== Ballet ===
Students before 2020 were housed at Skidmore College in Saratoga Springs, New York, close to the National Museum of Dance and the Saratoga Performing Arts Center, which hosts the New York City Ballet (NYCB) during the summer. The program is under the direction of NYCB Principal Jenifer Ringer. Students work every day with members of the NYCB and attend all of the company's performances at night. The School of Ballet also presents lectures on dance and career opportunities led by the staff and guest artists from around the world. Students receive intensive instruction in ballet, pointe, character, jazz, variations, and pas de deux. The dancers also partake in a physical therapy program.

=== Choral studies ===
The School of Choral Studies took place before 2020 at SUNY Fredonia, where students are led in daily chorus and private voice training, as well as given lessons in musical theater, opera, small ensembles, and voice recital. Students perform in the Roche Recital Hall in Mason Hall at SUNY Fredonia, as well as the Amphitheater at the nearby Chautauqua Institution. Classes are led by a highly skilled staff of professional music instructors from around the U.S. Students are also encouraged to enjoy concerts, operas, and many other social events planned by the staff at NYSSSA.

=== Dance ===
The School of Dance took place before 2020 at Skidmore College during the latter half of the summer, after the Ballet program is completed. Instruction takes place in the dance studios of the National Museum of Dance and the Skidmore Dance Theatre. Classes provide instruction in modern dance technique, composition, music for dance, career possibilities, repertory and performance. In addition to the staff and faculty, guest artists attend many nights a week. Workshop performances are also offered to the students, as well as trips to the National Museum of Dance and the Saratoga Performing Arts Center.

=== Media arts ===
The School of Media Arts took place before 2020 at Alfred State College, in Alfred, New York for four weeks in July. In the summer of 2024, it will take place at SUNY Fredonia for three weeks in July. The program includes classes in video, film making, photography, computer graphic arts, and new media, with courses providing a review of fundamentals of the craft, overview of aesthetics, and surveys of contemporary work, trends, and ideas, as well as giving students an opportunity to use professional equipment and facilities. Students work on a number of projects, both individually and collaboratively, throughout the program. While the curriculum stresses creative production, it is not exclusively goal-oriented. Exploration, experimentation, and discovery are stressed in each project. The program culminates with a final show and screening.

=== Orchestral studies ===
Prior to 2020, the School of Orchestral Studies was held at Skidmore College and was co-sponsored by the New York State School Music Association, the Saratoga Performing Arts Center (SPAC), and the Philadelphia Orchestra. Students take seminars on topics such as musicianship, free improvisation, and practice techniques. In addition to the full orchestra, students may perform in a string orchestra, wind ensemble, and other small ensembles. Throughout the program, students participate in several performances, including concerts at Empire Plaza and SPAC. The program's repertoire is coordinated with the Philadelphia Orchestra’s summer season, and many small ensembles perform before the Orchestra’s SPAC concerts. Students also receive weekly coaching from members of the Philadelphia Orchestra.

=== Theatre ===
The School of Theatre before 2020 took place at SUNY Delhi for four weeks. In Summer 2024, the School of Theatre will take place at SUNY Fredonia for three weeks in July. Students are given daily courses in improvisation, movement, voice and scene study. Guest artists and performers also provide master classes, readings, and workshops in diverse areas, such as stage combat, comedy and improvisation, mask, play writing, and directing. Students may also go on field trips to see plays. In addition to their rigorous course load, students write and direct plays, as well as perform in fellow students' work.

The School of Theatre is a summer intensive conservatory program. Students take six hours of daily classes and attend three hours of evening workshops, along with assigned reading and homework. Voice and movement training is based on the Alexander technique, while scene study includes a daily 90-minute Meisner Technique class focusing on repetition, activities, given circumstances, and scene work. The improvisation course draws from the teachings of Konstantin Stanislavski and Michael Chekhov. Required readings include An Actor Prepares by Stanislavski and The Actor's Art and Craft by William Esper.

Admission to the School of Theatre is by a competitive audition with 25 to 35 students are selected to participate. The audition consists of two contrasting monologues and an interview.

=== Visual arts ===
The School of the Arts took place before 2020 at SUNY Fredonia, where it will again be held in 2024 during the month of July. Students work in the studio with drawing, painting, printmaking, sculpture, mixed media, figure, and inter-disciplinary arts under the direction of noted exhibiting artists/educators. Related activities include drawing and painting from a live model, trips to farms and lakes in the area, and experience with art processes that include welding, casting, direct carving, modeling life-size objects in clay, and experimenting with a variety of printmaking techniques. Group critiques and discussions of student work provide feedback throughout the program.

== History ==
The New York State Summer School of the Arts was established in 1971, under Governor Nelson A. Rockefeller, opening with the Orchestral Studies program. In 1976 the School was expanded with the addition of Ballet, Choral, Theater, Media Arts, and Visual Arts programs. NYSSSA was expanded further in 1988 with the Dance and Jazz programs. It became virtual in 2020–2021 because of Covid-19 concerns, and was on hiatus in 2022–2023. It will be relaunched with three programs in 2024.

== Application ==
Placement in the schools is reserved for New York State residents who meet the selection criteria. If there are remaining openings after this selection, they may be filled by out-of-state students who meet additional criteria. Students must be enrolled in grades 8 through 12 and students must audition for the NYSSSA School they wish to attend. This audition is completed in person at a regional audition site, through a portfolio review, or in certain instances, through a video or audiotape review. Tuition for the schools is $2,500 which includes, room, board and classes and artistic events for the four-week residential program. State funds keep the tuition considerably lower than the actual program costs. Students are selected for the NYSSSA schools without regard to their financial need and tuition assistance forms are mailed to each student who is offered acceptance or alternate status for each program. NYSSSA awards financial assistance based upon individual need, but is limited to New York State residents only. Auditions are held throughout the state, and in 2024, may also be held on a virtual platform.

== Notable alumni ==
- David Heiss (Orchestral '71) – Cellist with the Metropolitan Opera since 1982, Principal Cellist with the New York Pops since 1989
- Jace Alexander (Theater 1980) – Television director (Rescue Me, Burn Notice, Law & Order)
- Philip Seymour Hoffman (Theater '84) – Oscar-winning actor (Capote), nominated for Best Supporting Actor (Charlie Wilson's War), as well as an accomplished stage actor and director
- Dan Futterman (Theater '84) – Accomplished actor (The Birdcage, A Mighty Heart, TV's Judging Amy) and nominated for Best Adapted Screenplay (Capote)
- Bennett Miller (Theater '84) – Film director (The Cruise, Moneyball, Foxcatcher), nominated for Best Director (Capote)
- Vanessa Carlton (Ballet '92) – Pop singer; hits include Grammy-nominated single "A Thousand Miles"
- Graham Goddard (Visual Arts '95) – Contemporary artist; exhibitions include the Skirball Museum and the California African American Museum
- Jeremy Cushman (Orchestral '08) – violin soloist, serving as concertmaster for the 2008 class

== See also ==
- Empire State Youth Orchestra
- Music school
- National Conference of Governor's Schools
