= Stroker & Hoop =

American adult animated television series

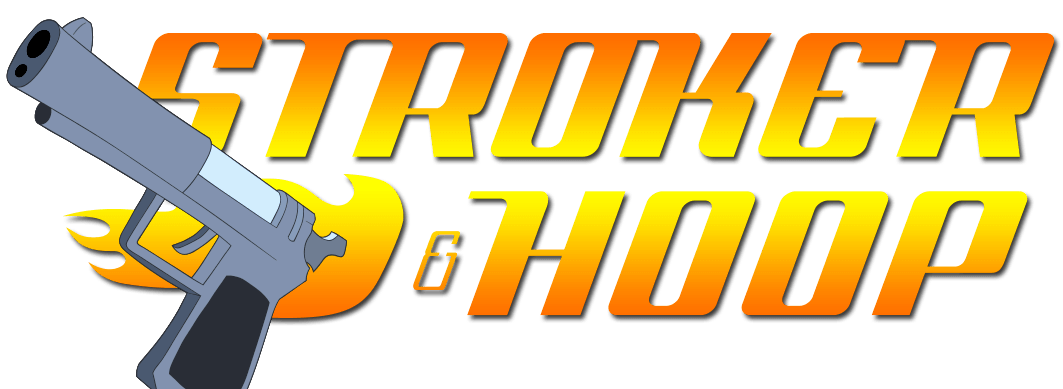
- Genre: Action comedy Adult animation Black comedy
- Created by: Casper Kelly; Jeffrey G. Olsen
- Written by: Casper Kelly; Jeffrey G. Olsen
- Directed by: David Wachtenheim; Robert Marianetti
- Voices of: Jon Glaser; Timothy "Speed" Levitch; Curtis Armstrong; Paul Christie
- Theme music composer: Michael Kohler
- Composers: Michael Kohler; Brent Busby and Ed Bair (Episode 1 only)
- Country of origin: United States
- Original language: English
- No. of seasons: 1
- No. of episodes: 13

Production
- Executive producers: Casper Kelly; Jeffrey G. Olsen
- Producer: Evan W. Adler
- Editors: Jon Dilling; Mark Farmer; Mike Iller
- Running time: 22 minutes approx.
- Production companies: Turner Studios; Williams Street

Original release
- Network: Adult Swim
- Release: August 1, 2004 – December 25, 2005

Stroker & Hoop is an American adult animated television series created by Casper Kelly and Jeffrey G. Olsen for Cartoon Network's late night programming block Adult Swim. The series is a parody of buddy cop films and television series such as Starsky & Hutch, and stars the voices of Jon Glaser as Stroker and Timothy "Speed" Levitch as Hoop. Stroker & Hoop premiered on August 1, 2004, and ended on December 25, 2005, with 13 episodes.

== Plot ==
Stroker and Hoop are a pair of private investigators from Los Angeles, who act and dress as if it is still the 1970s. Despite their individual high opinions of themselves, both men are hopelessly inept at their job. Stroker fancies himself a suave ladies' man, but is generally unpopular and perceived by virtually every woman he meets as a repulsive chauvinist; and Hoop considers himself a crime-solving ace and master of disguise, when in fact he is a gullible nerd and all of his disguises are failures. Their only "advantage" over their competition is C.A.R.R., a talking AMC Pacer with a neurotic personality. Because of their abysmal track record and less-than-stellar capabilities, the two men eke out livings solving crimes for people who cannot afford to hire more competent detectives. Invariably, their attempts to solve a crime result in bloodshed, violence, and thousands of dollars in property damage.

A recurring plot point of the series was to take myths and fantasies (such as mind control and Santa Claus) and make them real in an otherwise ordinary setting. Stroker often doubts the existence of these occurrences.

== Characters ==
- John Strockmeyer, aka Stroker (voiced by Jon Glaser) is an ex-mattress salesman turned private investigator, Stroker is largely apathetic to his job; he only enjoys it because it allows him to shoot people, and because it brings him into contact with dozens of promiscuous women on a daily basis, though those women usually want nothing to do with him. Although he considers himself an excellent detective and suave ladies' man, Stroker is actually a failure and a deadbeat; his wife left him and gained sole custody of their son, Keith, and Stroker's own incompetence and negligence resulted in his former partner, Jermaine, getting killed while working a case. Once in a while, Stroker will have a moment of being a genuine detective, although these moments are incredibly rare.
- Hoop Schwartz (voiced by Speed Levitch) is Stroker's ever-optimistic and nerdy partner. Although he considers himself brilliant and a master of disguise, Hoop is bare of average intelligence (though Stroker is no genius himself), and his disguises are poorly conceived and do nothing to hide his face. Unlike Stroker, Hoop is a detective because he loves the line of work. In a bit of dramatic irony, Stroker, who spends most of his time trying to bed women, fails miserably at it, while Hoop, who most often comes across as asexual, often finds himself having sex with gorgeous women who throw themselves at him.
- C.A.R.R. (voiced by Paul Christie) is a talking car who is Stroker and Hoop's primary mode of transportation and was state-of-the-art twenty years prior. C.A.R.R. is vengeful, paranoid, a bit racist, and often demonstrates effeminate behavior and, in spite of his otherwise masculine personality. He is a parody of Michael Knight's car KITT from Knight Rider and the name "C.A.R.R." is a parody of "K.A.R.R.", KITT's "evil" prototype. C.A.R.R. is painted to somewhat resemble the Ford Torino from Starsky & Hutch.
- Double Wide (voiced by Curtis Armstrong) - The apparent creator of C.A.R.R., Double Wide is a mechanic who spends his copious free time inventing bizarre things. He is a pornography connoisseur and can speak Spanish. Despite the fact that Stroker owes him thousands of dollars, Double Wide remains loyal to Stroker and Hoop out of a sense of duty, as Stroker used to sell mattresses with Double Wide's brother.
- Coroner Rick (voiced by Gary Anthony Williams) - A county coroner who often serves as a source of information for the main characters. Coroner Rick is a good friend of Stroker and Hoop, and even willing to hide evidence that would get them tried for murder. He has a knack for making crude jokes from an otherwise unfortunate and tragic event, sometimes with the victim still conscious. Rick occasionally solves crimes, but is fine with Stroker and Hoop taking the credit.
- Keith (voiced by Mary Birdsong) is Stroker's 10-year-old son. Lives with his mother, Angel Jimenez and has a strained relationship with Stroker who mixes attention with sheer neglect, resulting in moments where Keith genuinely loathes him. Keith has demonstrated bravery, such as standing up to a murderous ninja.
- Unnamed Man with Falsetto Voice: Originally believed to be just random background characters with the same voice, the finale reveals them to have all been the same man who wanted revenge on Stroker.

== Episodes ==
No.	Title	Original release date	Prod. code
1	"C.A.R.R. Trouble (a.k.a. Feelin' Dirty)"	August 1, 2004	101
Stroker and Hoop start off trying to talk to a demonically possessed teenager named Megan. After a series of events go horribly wrong, they leave Megan behind in favor of a new case: a high school charity car wash has been receiving threats, and hire Stroker and Hoop for protection.
2	"The Five Diamonds (a.k.a. A Hard Act to Follow)"	September 5, 2005	102
At Keith's birthday party, magician David Copperfield makes ten-year-old Danny Diamond-Schmiggler disappear, leading Stroker to take the case after shooting Copperfield. The trail of clues leads them to the ultimate boy-band: The Five Diamonds (Neil Diamond, Dustin Diamond, Mike Diamond, Lou Diamond Phillips, and a talking diamond). In the meantime, Hoop is trying to patch his relationship with his girlfriend Vanessa who is fed up with Hoop's lifestyle.
3	"Tinfoiled Again (a.k.a. Star Crossed Livers)"	September 12, 2005	103
A desperate client requests Stroker and Hoop's aid in stopping Ron Howard from entering his mind. In the meantime, Stroker tries to help out his son, who has been the victim of bullying, and takes an active role on Keith's tee ball team. Things are turned upside down when Stroker and Hoop are seduced by two hot ladies who steal their vestigial organs and Ron Howard ends up focusing his anger on Stroker.
4	"The Rube Job (a.k.a. Revenge is a Dish Best Served Fried)"	September 19, 2005	104
After getting on the bad side of notorious Colombian drug lord Tio the Terrible, Stroker and Hoop retreat down to Vidalutha, Mississippi where Hoop's identical cousin, Mumu is the town sheriff and requests the duo's aid in catching a serial killer who is hunting down contestants in a beauty pageant and turning them into the foods they're named after. To make things worse, a disgruntled Double-Wide helps lead Tio to their location.
5	"XXX Wife (a.k.a. Stroke Her and Boob)"	September 26, 2005	105
Stroker and Hoop are hired by pornography mogul Judd Winner to spy on his wife, who he suspects is cheating on him. His previously faithful wife, fed up with her husband's undisguised philandering, finally does cheat, with Hoop. In revenge, Stroker and Hoop are hypnotized into appearing in several porn videos, from straight (having sex with women) to bizarre (having sex with goats). As a result, Stroker and Hoop become adult film celebrities, which leads them to make several (failed) attempts of revenge against Winner, each resulting in greater humiliation for them. This episode is rated TV-MA S.
6	"Ninja Worrier (a.k.a. Chopping Spree)"	October 2, 2005	106
The episode starts off with Stroker talking about why he is on his back, bleeding on the sidewalk. At their weekly karate class, Keith is entrusted with protecting the handle of the Fire Lotus Sword from a band of ninjas who take down their teacher. In the struggle, Hoop manages to kill a ninja, this experience shatters him with guilt and he quits. In the meantime, Stroker and Keith use an attempted car bomb to fake their deaths and escape the ninjas, taking C.A.R.R. with them after extracting his brain (this is a parody of the Knight Rider episode "Soul Survivor" in which KITT's body was stolen and his CPU had to be carried around in a box resembling a portable TV). Believing Stroker has been murdered, Hoop goes into training with a karaoke singer, Suko who turns Hoop into a deadly assassin, she then tricks him into disposing of her ex-boyfriends, who, she misleads him into thinking, were the ninja.
7	"Quiller Instinct (a.k.a. Peeping Todd)"	October 9, 2005	107
Stroker is tricked into helping Double-Wide try to prove that his inventions have been stolen for years by his rival, Todd. Stroker works the case solo as Hoop behaves strangely after being pricked by a porcupine while protesting nuclear power, leading him to believe that he has super powers. To make things worse, all of Todd's appliances start to rebel against humans.
8	"Hip Hop Hooray (a.k.a. Gangsta Sap)"	November 20, 2005	108
Branching out as bodyguards, Stroker and Hoop are hired to watch over a party thrown by gangsta rapper MC Homicidal Rapist. It all goes badly as Homicidal Rapist is beaten and robbed of his home movies by three men in presidential masks. The next day, Homicidal Rapist and his protege, Li'l Rapist gives the duo a new assignment: retrieve his tapes and protect Homicidal Rapist's credibility or they will kill them. In the meantime, C.A.R.R. takes on a new job as a DJ on an "adult contemporary" station.
9	"Just Voodoo It (a.k.a. For Whom the Bear Tolls)"	November 27, 2005	109
After an elderly billionaire dies, Stroker and Hoop are hired by his young widow to find out what happened. They learn that a teddy bear found near the murder scene has the same injuries as the man, and Hoop suspects the bear's creators of using Voodoo. They travel to the company's headquarters in New Hampshire in order to learn more about the evil scheme, but they are captured by a witch doctor, turned into zombies (Stroker is, but Hoop manages to avoid the zombification powder by holding his breath), and then forced to make teddy bears in a Haitian factory as a form of cheap labor. Hoop attempts to start a strike but fails to bring anyone to the cause and afterward passes out due to exhaustion. Found by the CEO, Hoop is captured and scheduled to be zombified. Before the proceed with the zombification, Hoop asks for the reason he's using voodoo dolls for his evil plan. He reveals that "there is no plan" and that "zombies are just stupid". The CEO simply uses zombies for cheap labor, and they occasionally make voodoo dolls. Before Hoop can be zombified, Double-Wide, Coroner Rick, and Porsche, the billionaire's widow break in and attempt to attack the zombies, but fail due to the weapons only shooting light (Double-Wide confusing zombies being vulnerable to light due to the title Night of the Living Dead.) Hoop uses the break-in as a distraction to steal the zombification powder and zombify the CEO. He then orders the CEO to call off the attack, but Double-Wide uses a shotgun wired to C.A.R.R. to kill him before he can finish. Afterwards, Hoop tries to make a voodoo doll of the zombies, but misspells zombies for zombis. Coroner Rick then decides to "do what we should have done in the first place." Stroker and Porsche hide in a closet and attempt to have sex due to Porsche being aroused by deadly situations, but this is ruined when Hoop arrives to inform them that Coroner Rick has called the Haitian Police and saved them. Only one of the boys had survived the battle and was de-zombified. Stroker then promises everyone in the room $1 million out of the billion he earned solving the case (but then changes it to $100,000 after finding out that there are only 1,000 millions in a billion.) Right after, Ansel, the dead billionaire, appears to reclaim his wife and money after his voodoo bear has been patched up. When Stroker asks for the billion for solving his murder, Ansel informs him that "The only thing is, I'm not dead" thereby making the case worthless. To get revenge, Stroker and Hoop make voodoo dolls of Porsche and Ansel and give them to the surviving boy.
10	"I Saw Stroker Killing Santa Claus (a.k.a. A Cold, Dead, White Christmas)"	December 4, 2005	110
While Stroker is waiting in line with Keith to meet Santa Claus, an unknown assailant jabs Santa with a hypodermic needle. Stroker chases him but mall security interferes, but not before Stroker grabs the assailant's lottery ticket. At Coroner Rick's, Rick gives Santa a grim prognosis: he has been poisoned with a slow-acting substance not recorded before. Stroker initially pledges to help Santa but changes plans when it turns out the ticket the perp dropped is a winner. Stroker and Hoop end up leaving for the ski slopes, leaving Santa to suffer. C.A.R.R. later takes it on himself to save Santa and Christmas while a drunk Stroker is visited by the ghosts of Christmas past, present, and future, starting with his late partner, Jermaine Washington.
11	"How to Get Dead in Advertising (a.k.a. Caged Rose)"	December 11, 2005	111
Hoop's mom Rose Schwartz is charged with the brutal murder of her former supervisor and Stroker and Hoop are called on to clear her name. To do so, they go undercover as advertising executives "Stroganoff and Hopowitz" where Hoop gets caught up with trying to come up with a new ad campaign for Freshen Up Fabric Softeners. In the meantime, Rose has difficulty adjusting to prison where she gets on the wrong side of a Hispanic senior citizen gang.
12	"The Wrath of Khan'Ja (a.k.a. Dammit Mamet)"	December 18, 2005	112
Stroker comes upon a wrecked space ship with a beautiful alien. He is entrusted with trying to retrieve the funds for a giant sapphire to save her and allow Stroker to be the leader of an enslaved human race. Meanwhile, Hoop is heavily involved in starring in the new David Mamet play at the local theater.
13	"Three Cheats to the Wind (a.k.a. Putting the 'Ass' in Assassin)"	December 25, 2005	113
Stroker, Hoop, Double-Wide, and Coroner Rick have a cookout on Stroker's front lawn. When they realize they're out of buns, Stroker, Hoop, and Double-Wide take C.A.R.R. to the store. However, C.A.R.R. is reprogrammed and knocks out the three with a special type of gas. When Stroker, Hoop, and Double-Wide wake up in C.A.R.R., they are suspended from a crane over a large canyon. The gang is taunted over the radio by the villain that has trapped them inside and is about to kill them, as they struggle to figure out who would have a past grudge against them. In the end it is revealed to be an unnamed minor background character who has actually appeared in many episodes in the past, each time Stroker and Hoop horribly (albeit indirectly) affecting his life: he wasn't noticeable each time because often he was left unrecognizable by his run-ins with Stroker and Hoop. He was the office worker Frank Wilson in "Ninja Worrier" who had CDs impaled into his face like throwing stars by Hoop. He became a waiter at a Southern themed restaurant, a messenger, a caterer and even a male prostitute. He was originally the mysterious assailant who killed Stroker's old partner Jermaine in a flashback in "I Saw Stroker Killing Santa". He explained that he was stealing medicine to save his dying baby daughter Karen. However, he was arrested by Stroker, who was only interested in collecting the reward money, and Karen died. At the last minute, Coroner Rick stumbles upon the kidnapper as he gloats to Stroker and Hoop over the radio, and holds him at gunpoint. Unfortunately, he can't stop the kidnapper from hitting the remote control which releases the crane, and sends C.A.R.R. and everyone inside him plummeting to the bottom of the canyon. The words "To Be Continued" appeared on-screen with a question mark appearing afterwards.

=== Planned conclusion ===
Following the show's cancellation, creators Casper and Jeff made a posting to the Adult Swim blog outlining what would have happened in the second-season premiere. The episode would have opened with the revelation that Stroker and Hoop died in the crash and were sent to the afterlife; Hoop, specifically, was sent to a section of Hell reserved for lettuce, on a technicality. C.A.R.R.'s brain and one hubcap survived the crash. Double Wide also survived the crash but ended up in the burn ward of the hospital, where he received visions of Stroker and Hoop in the afterlife. Trying to save them, Double Wide with Keith's help puts himself on ice to temporarily "kill" himself, but is stopped by doctors at the last minute. To save Stroker and Hoop, Double Wide shoots himself and Coroner Rick. The two men then travel to the afterlife where they meet Stroker's father, a janitor in limbo, and Suko from episode six. A series of events leads to the death of God. God's temporary absence from Heaven – a technicality stipulates that it takes 20 minutes for God's soul to return to Heaven – allows all the main characters, including Stroker's father, to return to Earth along with a large number of others who were also in Heaven.

== Cancellation ==
In February 2006, Les Harper, head animator on the show, announced via AdultSwim.com that the show has not been greenlit for a second season and will therefore not continue, leaving the show on a cliffhanger ending. It was stated by the creators both on the Adult Swim message board and the employee blog. The blog entry was on February 10. Furthermore, the show was confirmed to be cancelled in 2008 during an Adult Swim marathon consisting only of cancelled shows. The creators will continue to work with Williams Street regardless of the cancellation. Reruns of the existing episodes occasionally air on Adult Swim, and previously ran on Teletoon in Canada since September 2006.

== Home media ==
Although Stroker & Hoop has never been released on DVD, all thirteen episodes are available on iTunes and Tubi.
