= Rose Bud, Arkansas =

- Town
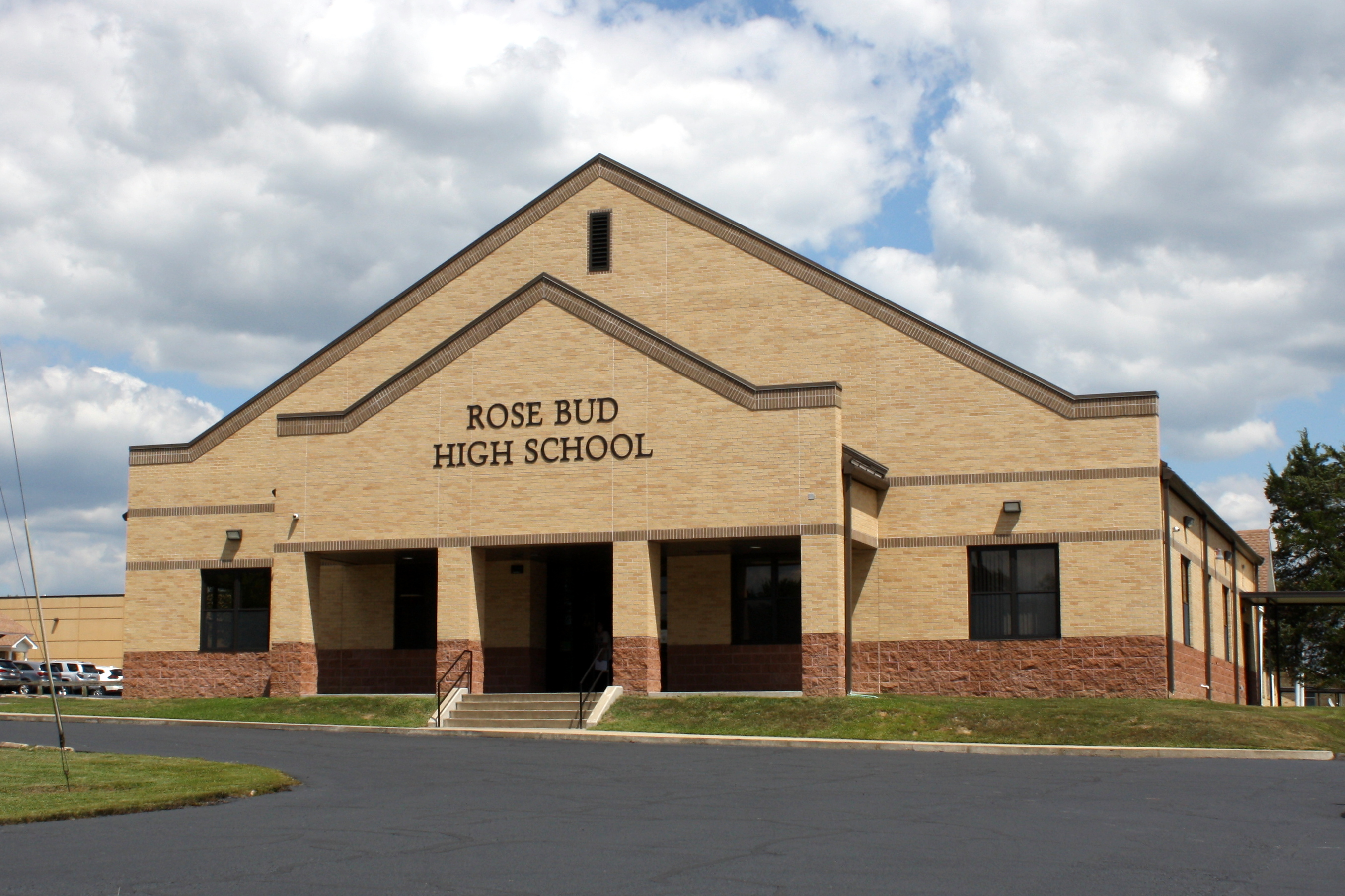
- Rose Bud High School

- Seal

- Location of Rose Bud in White County, Arkansas.
- Coordinates: 35°19′30″N 92°04′52″W
- Country: United States
- State: Arkansas
- County: White

Area
  - Total: 6.07 sq mi (15.71 km^{2})
  - Land: 6.04 sq mi (15.64 km^{2})
  - Water: 0.027 sq mi (0.07 km^{2})
- Elevation: 745 ft (227 m)

Population (2020)
  - Total: 494
  - Estimate (2025): 498 ▲
  - Density: 81.8/sq mi (31.59/km^{2})
- Time zone: UTC-6 (Central (CST))
  - Summer (DST): UTC-5 (CDT)
- ZIP code: 72137
- Area code: 501
- FIPS code: 05-60770
- GNIS feature ID: 2407243
- Website: townofrosebud.com

Rose Bud is a town in White County, Arkansas, United States. As of the 2020 census, Rose Bud had a population of 494. Rose Bud has its own school district with Pre-K through 12th grade.

== Geography ==
According to the United States Census Bureau, the town has a total area of 15.2 km^{2} (5.9 mi^{2}), of which 15.2 km^{2} (5.9 mi^{2}) is land and 0.17% is water.

Rose Bud is the third largest town in the county by area. Composed of mainly wooded area and cattle land.

== Demographics ==
Historical population
Census	Pop.	Note	%±
1880	38		—
1970	157		—
1980	202		28.7%
1990	156		−22.8%
2000	429		175.0%
2010	482		12.4%
2020	494		2.5%
2025 (est.)	498	▲	0.8%
U.S. Decennial Census

As of the 2010 census, the population was 482. The population density was 28.2/km^{2} (73.1/mi^{2}). There were 191 housing units at an average density of 12.3/km^{2} (31.9/mi^{2}). The population is racially composed of 89.7% White, 1.1% Hispanic, 0.8% Other, and 9.5% Two or More. There are about 105 boys for every 100 girls. Most of the population is between 50 and 54 years of age.

There were 191 households, out of which 12.9% had children under the age of 18 living with them, 29.5% were married couples living together, 4.1% had a female householder with no husband present, and 23.7% were non-families. 7.9% of all households were made up of individuals, and 7.9% had someone living alone who was 65 years of age or older. The average household size was 2.52 and the average family size was 3.02.

In the town, the population was spread out, with 22.6% under the age of 18, 17% from 18 to 24, 22.2% from 25 to 44, 28.4% from 45 to 64, and 16% who were 65 years of age or older. The median age was 41 years. For every 100 females, there were 105 males.

The median income for a household in the town was $34,732, and the median income for a family was $37,375. Males had a median income of $28,438 versus $27,750 for females. The per capita income for the town was $22,677. About 11.0% of families and 11.1% of the population were below the poverty line, including 23.3% of those under age 18 and 4.0% of those age 65 or over.

== Arts and culture ==
The Darden-Gifford House was built in the late 1800s by J.W. Darden. it was added to the National Register of Historic Places in 1976.

== Education ==
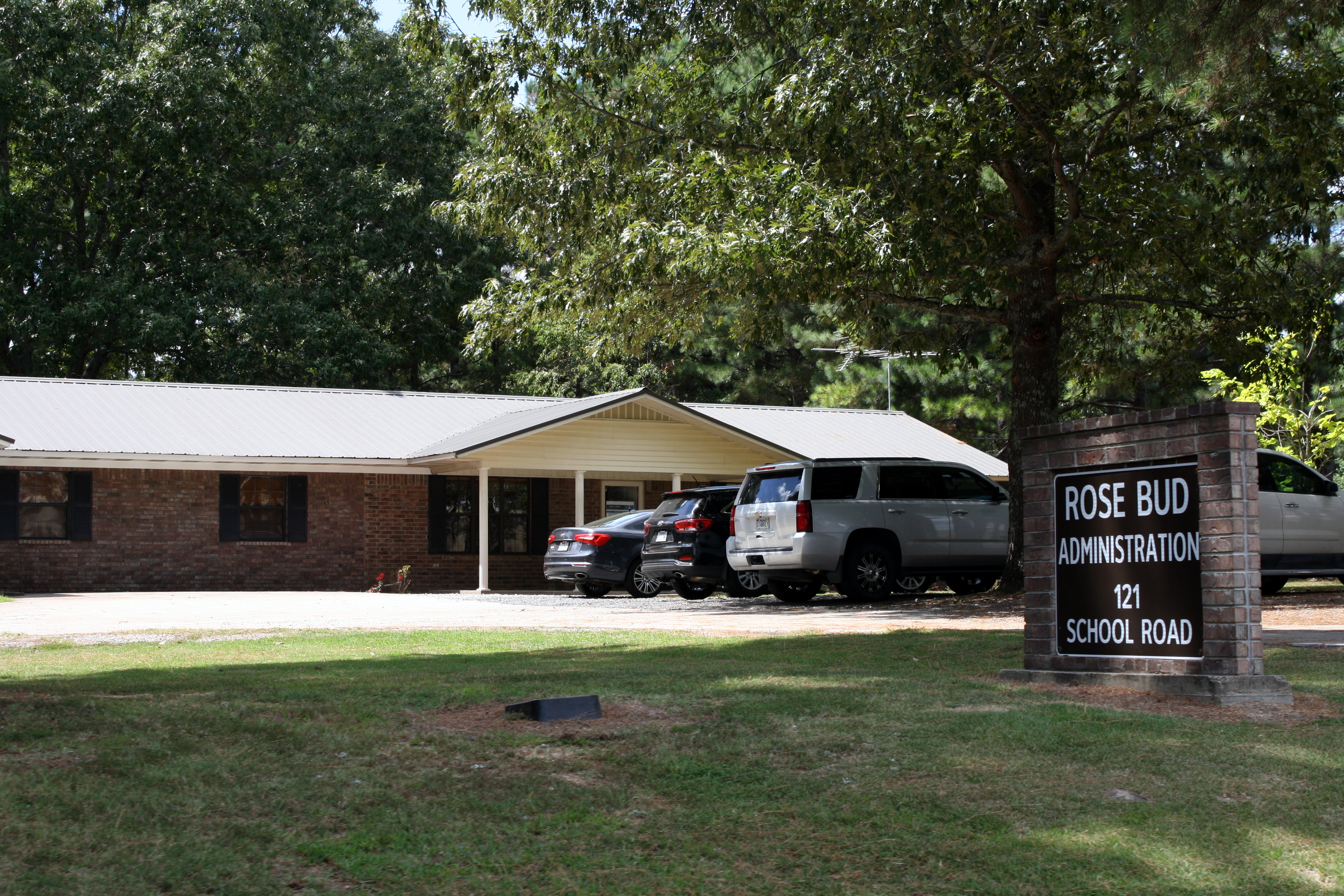
Rose Bud School District headquarters

Public education from pre-kindergarten through grade 12 is provided by the Rose Bud School District, including Rose Bud High School and Rose Bud Elementary School.

== Notable people ==
- Nick Bacon, Medal of Honor recipient for his heroic actions in Vietnam in 1969.
