= Governor's School of International Studies =

The Governor's School of International Studies is one of the six schools that make up the New Jersey Governor's School program. Since its creation in 2000, the program has been held at Ramapo College in Mahwah, in Bergen County, New Jersey and aims to teach scholars about diplomacy and international cultures. The program has traditionally included a one-week immersion study in Quebec, Canada. Due to budget cuts in 2006, however, scholars in that year and in 2007 did not study in Canada, but instead spent additional time at the United Nations in New York City.

All 90-100 scholars are divided into ten different country teams, which change each year. The program culminates in four debates between the nations, each on a different international issue. The issues pertain to four different categories: human rights, environment, public health, and trade. In 2007, the specific issues discussed were extraordinary rendition, climate change, the spread of tuberculosis, and debt relief. The debates, simulated using International Communication and Negotiation Simulations (ICONS), developed originally at the University of Maryland, emphasized negotiations and diplomacy.

In addition to the four themed conferences, scholars attend a variety of classes that complement individual research. The 2007 program had a strong focus on the Millennium Development Goals, as development and infrastructure became recurring themes in the resolutions presented during the conferences. Scholars also had the opportunity to hear from a variety of guest speakers, including an ambassador from Zimbabwe, a Governor's School alumnus who started the DiscoverWorlds global issues awareness program, and a representative from the Peace Corps.

On July 20, 2006, the Governor's School for International Studies ended early due to an outbreak of whooping cough.
