= Governor's School of New Jersey =

The Governor's School of New Jersey, a member of the National Conference of Governor's Schools, is a summer program for academically talented high school students from New Jersey who have completed their junior year and who are interested in the STEM fields. The School is an intensive residential program conducted on two college campuses in the state. Emphasis is placed on problem solving of complex issues that exist on the local, state, national, and international levels. To foster creativity, the program provides no grades or academic credit.

Since 2006, the program has been primarily funded privately yet is still free of charge for its students. The available programs have decreased from a high of six. In 2013, only two schools were held: the School in the Sciences, and the School of Engineering & Technology. For 2014, the School of Engineering & Technology will run for four weeks; the Sciences program for three weeks. A majority of alumni go on to attend Ivy League and comparable institutions.

== History ==
The Governor's School was chartered by Governor of New Jersey Thomas Kean in 1983. The first school, School of Public Issues-Monmouth University, began with 113 students. In 1984, two additional programs were added, School in the Sciences-Drew University, and School of the Arts-The College of New Jersey. Each program accepted 100 students. In 1989, School on the Environment-Richard Stockton College of New Jersey was added with an additional 100 students.

The Governor's School on International Studies at Ramapo College began in July 2000, and the School of Engineering and Technology, housed on the Busch Campus of Rutgers University, was established in July 2001.

=== 2006 budget cuts and changes in funding ===
From inception in 1983 through 2006, the School had been free-of-charge. By 2006, the School had grown to serve more than 600 students per year. To help control the 2006 budget, Governor Jon Corzine proposed cuts to several education programs. He eliminated the entire $1.9mm allocated to the Governor's School.

Alumni, parents, faculty and others who realized the value of the program, however, organized fundraising in order for the 2006 Schools to be held. They were funded entirely with private contributions. On September 22, 2006, the Star-Ledger reported that Gov. Corzine signed Executive Order 35 (2006) to continue the Governor's School of New Jersey as a privately funded, tuition-based program.

In 2007, the state funded $100,000, or approximately 6% of the total budget of the program. Due to limited financial resources, the program was shorter and admitted fewer scholars than in 2008.

On July 20, 2006, the Governor's School for International Studies was cancelled due to an outbreak of whooping cough among the students. This closure marked the first premature end of any New Jersey Governor's School program.

=== Reductions in programs ===
On October 10, 2008, the Governor's School of New Jersey website stated, "There will be no Governor's School of the Arts in 2009. It is hoped that this School may be reinstituted for the Summer of 2010." The School of the Arts has not yet reopened. According to the website as of 2013, "the Governor’s School of Public Issues and Governor’s School of International Studies ceased operations in" 2009, and "the Governor's School on the Environment did not operate in Summer 2011." Since 2012, only the two schools of the Sciences, and of Engineering and Technology continue to operate.

School	Location	Inaugural year	Final year
Governor's School of Public Issues	Monmouth University	1983	2009
Governor's School in the Sciences	Drew University	1984	active
Governor's School of the Arts	The College of New Jersey	1984	2008
Governor's School on the Environment	Richard Stockton College of New Jersey	1989	2010
Governor's School of International Studies	Ramapo College	2000	2009
Governor's School of Engineering and Technology	Rutgers University, Busch Campus	2001	active

== Admission ==
Students must be nominated by the guidance counselor in the high school. An interested student should speak with the guidance counselor in September of his/her junior year to express an interest in applying to the program. The program is open to all public, private, and parochial schools in New Jersey, and to all home-schooled students who live in New Jersey.

Since its inception in 1983, the program has served over 11,000 students. Typically 400-500 students per program apply, and approximately 85-100 students are accepted into each program each year.

The 2013 Governor's School of the Sciences accepted 85 students out of 400 applicants. The 2014 Governor's School of Engineering and Technology offered admission to 88 students from over 325 finalists. All had first to be nominated by their respective high schools.

In 2016, due to large cutbacks, the Governor's School of the Sciences could only accept 58 students, from applicants from more than 300 schools across New Jersey. Applicants had to first be nominated by their school, and depending on the size of the school, only one to three students could be nominated.

== Curriculum ==
In the School of the Sciences, scholars participate in a team project, an elective, and three core courses, which can range from molecular orbital theory to human evolution to special relativity. Available team projects included experiments in psychology, physics/math, and kinetics. The team projects are set up by team project leaders, who are usually professors. The scholars then either design their own experiments or they follow other preset experiments. By the end of the governor's school, each team puts together a paper and a slideshow. The slideshow is presented to the other teams, the professors, and any sponsors on the last day of governor's school.

== Notable alumni ==
=== Governor's School of Public Issues ===
- Demetri Martin, comedian
- Boris Epshteyn

=== Governor's School in the Sciences ===
- Adam Riess (1987 attendee), 2011 Nobel Prize winner in Physics
- Laura Bilodeau Overdeck, co-founder of Overdeck Family Foundation, Founder and President of Bedtime Math
- Atul Butte (1986 attendee), scientist

=== Governor's School of the Arts ===
- Kal Penn, actor, Harold & Kumar Go to White Castle (2004)
- Hector Luis Bustamante, actor and graphic designer
- Gerard Canonico, actor, Spring Awakening (2006)
- Tina Gharavi, filmmaker, 1998, set up Bridge and Tunnel Productions, filmed Closer (2000); Mother/Country (2002)
- Chad Cooper, filmmaker, Flowerbomb (2006)
- Cristin Milioti, actor, "Once (musical), How I Met Your Mother, Wolf of Wall Street"
- Rebecca Metz, actor, Better Things (TV series), Coop and Cami Ask the World, Shameless (U.S. TV series)
- Dan Poblocki, author,

== Representation in other media ==
- The 2006 Video/Film scholars made a documentary about the Governor's School of the Arts, available at the Film/Video scholars' website.

== See also ==
New Jersey Scholars Program, a similar selective program with a focus on the humanities.
