= Graham Goddard =

Trinidadian American conceptual artist (born 1982)

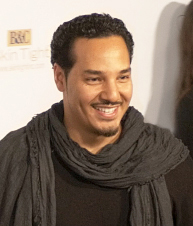
- Graham Goddard in Hollywood, California
- Born: 12 April 1982 (age 44); Port of Spain, Trinidad and Tobago
- Education: University of Southern California
- Known for: Conceptual art, installation art, painting
- Notable work: Paradigm, All Public Art
- Website: www.grahamgoddard.com

Graham Goddard (born April 12, 1982) is a Trinidadian American conceptual artist known for making visual statements about the environment, spirituality and commodification through painting, sculpture and site-specific land art installations. Goddard's work has been exhibited at the Skirball Museum, the California African American Museum and numerous art galleries in the United States and abroad. Goddard is also the founder of All Public Art, a social media platform and mobile app for artists and art enthusiasts, which assists in the discovery of artwork in public spaces and provides a photo-sharing and e-commerce component for people to sell or purchase art related items.

== Life and career ==
=== Early life ===
Goddard was born in Port of Spain, Trinidad. In 1989, the Goddards moved from Woodbrook, Trinidad to Spring Valley, New York. As a child Goddard received training in watercolor painting from Rockland Center for the Arts and had his first solo exhibition in 1992 at the age of 10 at the Filkenstein Gallery in New York. As a child Goddard won numerous art contests, including Coca-Cola's national art competition in 1995. In 1995, Goddard was the youngest artist selected to attend the prestigious New York State Summer School of the Arts (NYSSSA) in Cazenovia, New York. Goddard attended Spring Valley High School, and painted a mural in the school's main hallway titled "Land of the Tiger;" the painting was filled with hidden imagery inspired by artist Bev Doolittle.

Goddard studied fine arts at the University of Southern California (USC) (Class of 2004, BFA). At USC, Goddard explored inverted imagery and developed the Rotating Canvas after being inspired by the paintings of 14th-century Italian painter Giuseppe Arcimboldo. Goddard's Rotating Canvas allows the viewer to turn the painting 180 degrees, exposing inverted images within his work. He first introduced the concept in the exhibition "Flip" at the Helen Lindhurst Fine Arts Gallery in 2004.

=== Early work ===
In 2005, Goddard exhibited at numerous galleries and venues, including Feinstein Art Gallery, JAMCAAR and the Republic of Trinidad and Tobago Consulate of New York. In 2007, Goddard teamed up with fashion designer Karl Kani to develop a clothing line which fused art and fashion.

In 2008, Goddard's miniature painting series was exhibited at Sargent's Fine Art in Maui, Hawaii. Goddard also started exploring spirituality in his paintings and included references to the Bible in watercolor paintings such as "Almost Time," which explored his interest in faith and included his feelings of displacement as a Trinidadian in the United States. Goddard's collectors during this period included singer and actress Vanessa Williams, actress Regina King, actress Gabrielle Union, boxing champion Laila Ali and actress Ana Ortiz.

=== Museum exhibitions ===
"Inside My Head"- California African American Museum

In May 2009 Goddard was invited to exhibit in the California African American Museum's exhibition, "Inside My Head: Intuitive Artists of African Descent," curated by Mar Hollingsworth. The exhibition showcased works by 32 contemporary artists of African descent who have developed a mature style in an intuitive manner. Goddard exhibited the inverted watercolor and acrylic paintings "Legacy" and "God's Speed." The exhibit also featured Goddard's works "In the Smallest Places," "On the Precipice of Faith," and "Word Travels." The works incorporated Goddard's West Indian heritage and addressed America´s struggle with spirituality.

"An Idea Called Tomorrow"- The Skirball Museum & California African American Museum

"An Idea Called Tomorrow" (November 19, 2009 - May 8, 2010) was a historical collaborative partnership between the California African American Museum (CAAM) and the Skirball Museum. Co-conceived by CAAM and the Skirball, the exhibition marked the first time in history that the institutions collaborated. The participating artists’ ethnicities and backgrounds were as diverse as their presentations, which addressed a broad range of social justice issues of both regional and global relevance, such as environmental sustainability, shelter for all, human equity, equal access and respect, healthy living, reconciliation and forgiveness, and cooperation and peace.

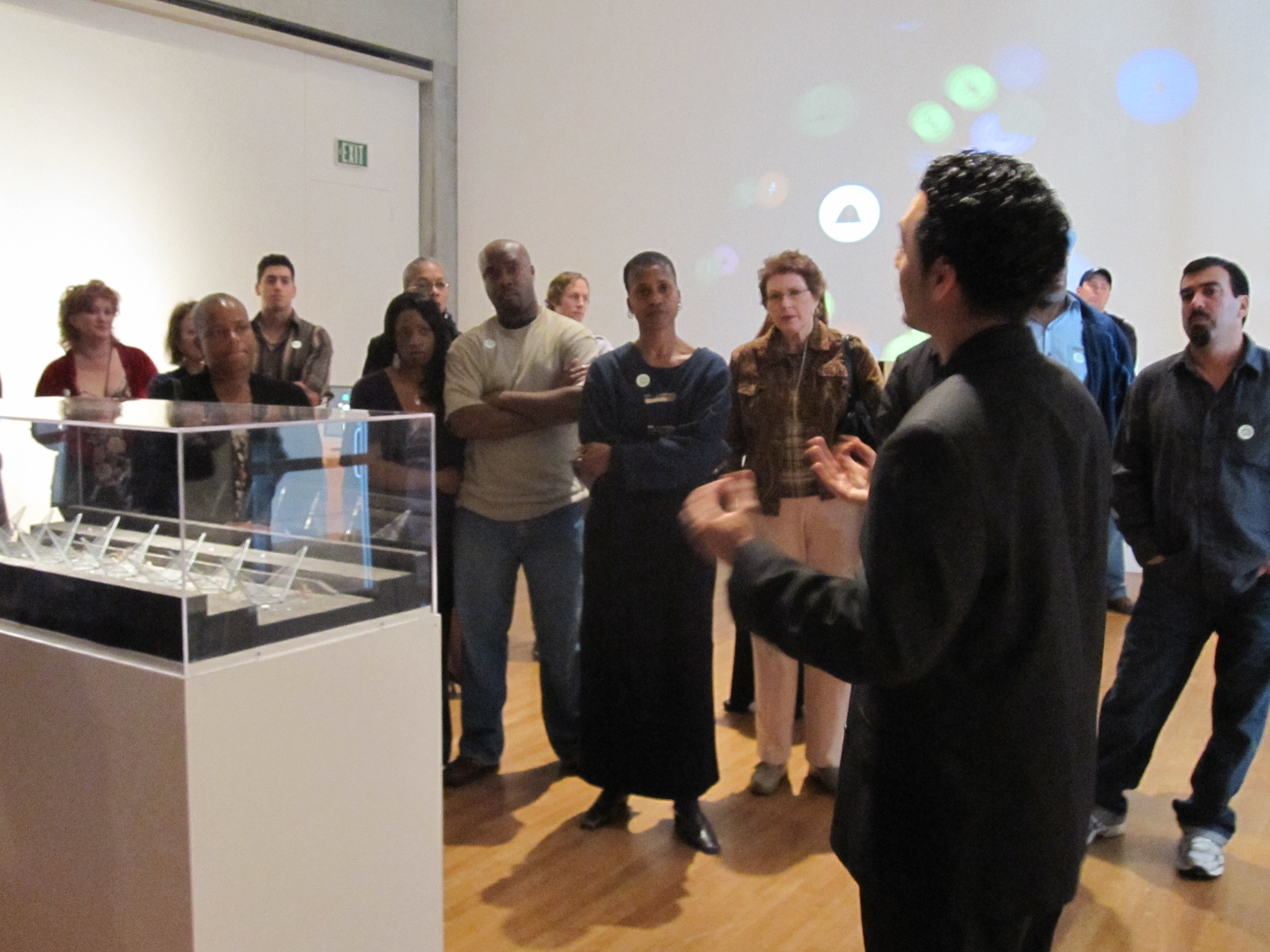
Goddard speaking at the Skirball Museum.

Goddard was invited to exhibit his 50-foot site-specific installation "Paradigm" in front of the museum.

At the Skirball Museum's "An Idea Called Tomorrow II," (November 19, 2009 - March 7, 2010) Goddard exhibited the conceptual plans and a maquette of "Paradigm." Goddard is the first Trinidadian in history to exhibit at the Skirball Museum. The exhibition received over 100,000 visitors while it was open. Inspired by land artists such as Robert Smithson, Andy Goldsworthy and Christo and Jeanne Claude, Goddard displayed blueprints designed to instruct the viewer how to build "Paradigm" for themselves, suggesting that anyone could create what Goddard created and contribute to constructive ecological action to renew the environment.

=== "Paradigm"– site-specific installation ===
"Paradigm" is part of a series of land artworks by Goddard designed to investigate their surrounding environments as objects consisting of a process of ongoing relationships between man and nature while addressing our ecological responsibility towards a healthy environment tomorrow.

Goddard places “Paradigm” in multiple locations that are at risk and affected by pollution, such as mountains, deserts and watersheds. For an "Idea Called Tomorrow" at the Skirball Museum and the California African American Museum, Goddard proposed the installation of “Paradigm” in the Ballona Creek, a toxic watershed in Culver City, California.

=== Gallery exhibitions ===
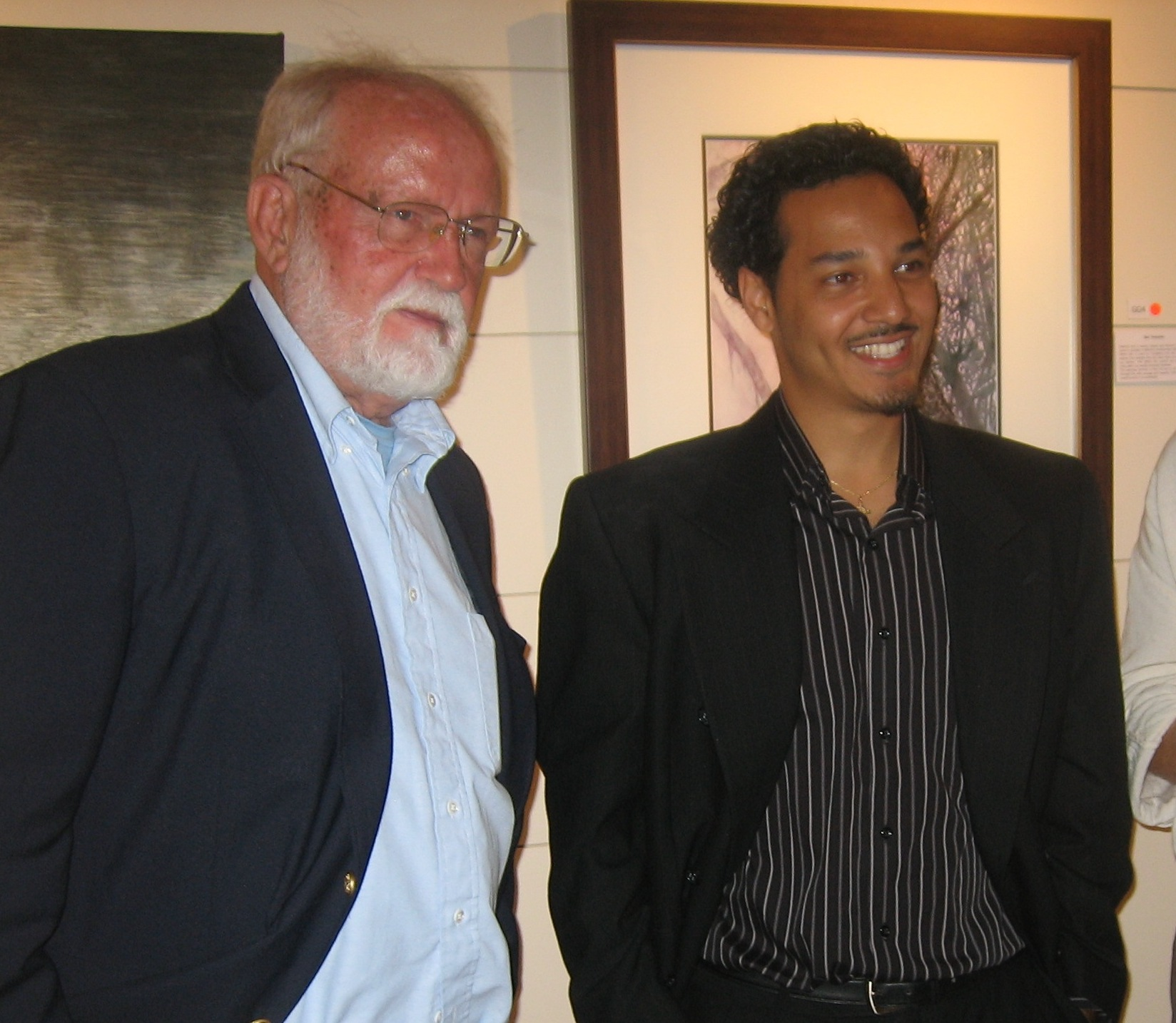
Artists Bob Mackie and Goddard at their exhibition in Horizon's Fine Art Gallery, 2009.

In December 2009 Goddard was invited to exhibit at Horizon's Fine Art in the Republic of Trinidad and Tobago with Bob Mackie and Jonathon Guy-Gladding. Goddard's large acrylic paintings investigated the ephemeral nature of Trinidad’s ever-changing forest by eliminating and substituting it with black backgrounds, fading backdrops and inverted images. Carnival designer Brian MacFarlene and Trinidadian artist Carlisle Harris were in attendance. Goddard is scheduled to have a solo exhibition at Horizon's Fine Art in May 2011.

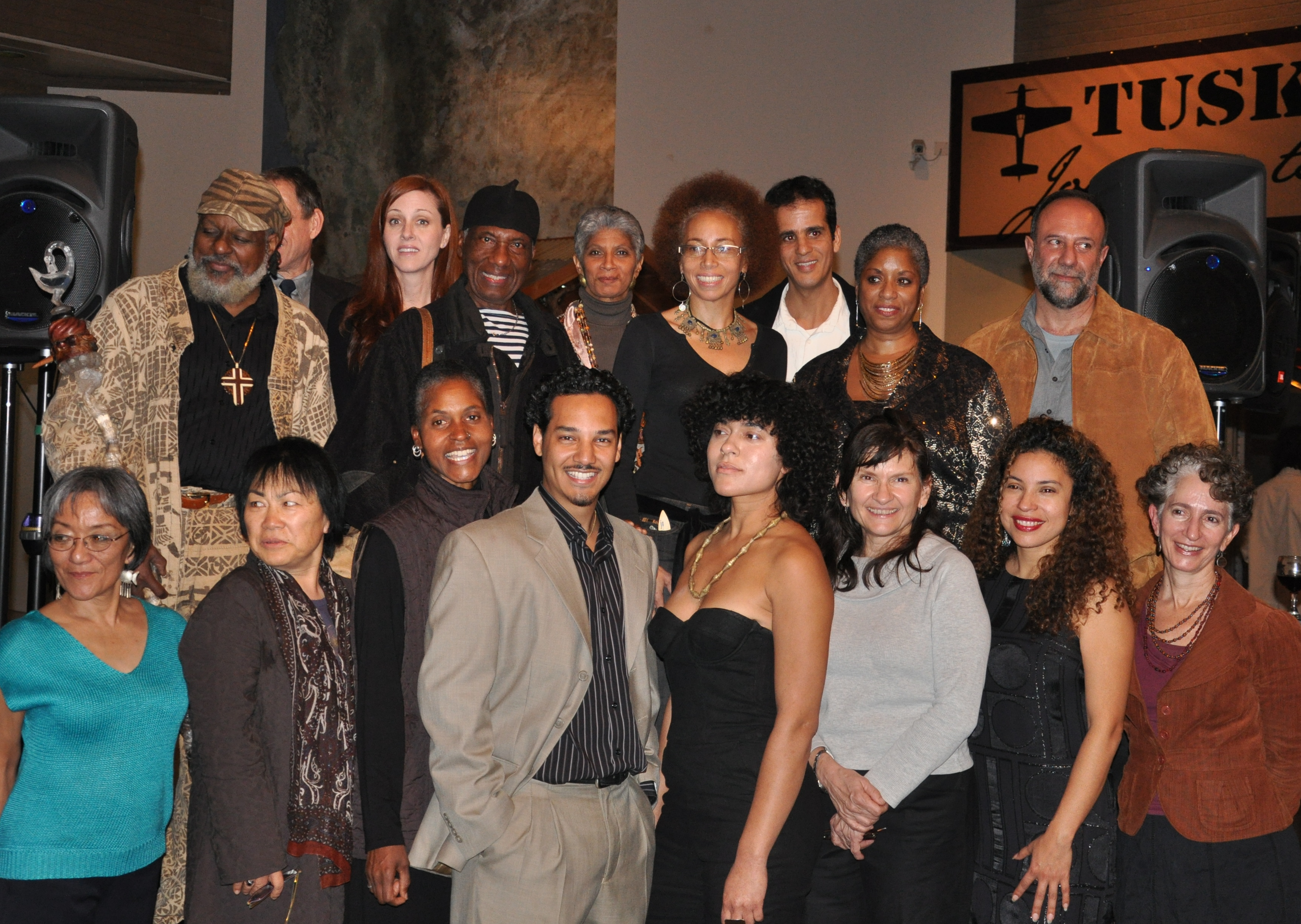
Goddard and artists in the exhibition "An Idea Called Tomorrow at the California African American Museum, 2009.

In 2009, Goddard exhibited at the Avenue 50 Gallery's "365 and Counting" Exhibition in Los Angeles. Goddard featured the inverted painting "Hope in a World of Peril." Notable artists in the exhibition included Chukes, CCH Pounder and Yrneh Brown. "Hope In a World of Peril" explored text from the Book of Revelation in the Bible and addressed the perilous political climate that the United States was in, as President Barack Obama completed his historical first year in office as President of the United States.

Goddard is scheduled to have a solo exhibition at LA Artcore on March 2, 2011 - March 27, 2011. The exhibition, titled "Graham Goddard's American Playground," will feature a new body of work by the artist, including his controversial painting "America at Play," which explores the major issues that the United States has faced for the last 10 years. Highlighting the discrimination, exploitation and controversial topics that affect Americans, the painting uses a playground of children as a metaphor for the United States’ tumultuous political climate. “America at Play” addresses the issues of Same Sex Marriage, immigration, Native American exploitation, Polygamy, the World Trade Center bombing and Hurricane Katrina.

=== Music and expressionism ===
On October 12, 2015 Goddard launched a new body of work that merges music and Neo-expressionist painting. The new work consists of large-scale (6 ft) rotating paintings that were simultaneously created with the poetry and songs. During the creative process, Goddard partnered with musician and music producer, Patrick Graves, to create the songs in the series. "Run to the Light," the first song and painting introduced, addressed Goddard's struggle with aspiring for more while being stagnant in life. Each song and painting in the new series is scheduled to be released in increments by Goddard throughout 2016 and 2017.

== Philanthropy and community involvement ==
Goddard has been a guest speaker at colleges and high schools including Loyola Marymount University, the University of Southern California and Fox Lane High School in Bedford, New York.

In 2008, Goddard launched the "Surrender a Moment to God" project which encourages at-risk inner city youth to contribute to a large painting by drawing, painting, or writing statements explaining what surrendering to God means to them. Over 200 at-risk youth in Southern California have contributed to the project. Goddard believes that when young people are faced with tough circumstances, the simplest and most powerful thing they can do is get closer to God.
