= Up to Speed =

2012 American TV series

- Genre: History/Travel
- Directed by: Richard Linklater
- Country of origin: United States
- Original language: English
- No. of seasons: 1
- No. of episodes: 6 (list of episodes)

Production
- Producers: Alex Lipschultz, John Sloss, Dana O'Keefe, Richard Linklater
- Running time: 24 minutes

Original release
- Network: Hulu
- Release: August 9 – September 13, 2012

Up to Speed is a historical travel television series starring Timothy "Speed" Levitch and directed by Richard Linklater airing on Hulu.

== Details ==
Up to Speed is a six-episode travel show produced by Magikal History Productions exclusively for Hulu. It is hosted by the quirky New York tour guide Timothy "Speed" Levitch who takes viewers on a "magical history tour" in order to “hang out and empathize with the inner psyches of famous landmarks and visit with the monumentally ignored monuments.” Each episode seeks to highlight places, people, things, and monuments that are usually overlooked by the average tourist in lieu of the more known sites.

Visiting San Francisco, Kansas, Missouri New York City, Chicago, and Monticello/University of Virginia Levitch narrates the history of each object and includes a broader history of the time so viewers can understand its importance. Besides highlighting little known monuments, the other aspect that makes Up to Speed different is that Levitch converses with each monument, asking them questions about their role in history and their feelings about current developments. Each of these items speaks back to Levitch with a unique and often equally quirky personality, some even going so far to yell profanities at him.

Each episode is written by Levitch and is infused with his unique poetic language and philosophies such as: "Status quo only begets more status quo unless we as a species attack it by way of appreciating the beauty in the unexpected" and "Instead of asking why, ask why the fuck not?” Levitch ends each episode performing with a band and freestyle singing about the monuments highlighted in that episode. These factors have made it a fan favorite on Hulu earning it a four star viewer rating and many positive reviews.

== Episodes ==
Episode 1 San Francisco: A City Shaped by Earthquakes Original Air Date: 08/09/2012 Synopsis: Speed takes us on a tour of renowned objects in San Francisco – a city shaped by earthquakes that makes a point of attacking the status quo and appreciating the beauty in the unexpected.

Episode 2 Chicago: To Conjure a Lost Neighborhood Original Air Date: 08/16/2012 Synopsis: Speed spends a day steeped in the history of working class Chicago – a city of blue collar labor constantly fighting back against the status quo of their corporate overlords.

Episode 3 Kansas & Missouri: In the Middle of the Middle of the Midwest Original Air Date: 08/23/2012 Synopsis: Speed explores the idea of borders and boundaries in Lawrence, Kansas – a city straddling the line between opposing sides during the American Civil War.

Episode 4 Virginia: The Many Flavors of Thomas Jefferson Original Air Date: 08/30/2012 Synopsis: Speed sifts through the many flavors of Thomas Jefferson in Monticello and the University of Virginia – two historic landmarks representing the many sides of America’s most complicated founding father. History Featured:

Episode 5 New York City: The Beauty of Randomness Original Air Date: 09/05/2012 Synopsis:Speed wanders through the chaos of New York City – a metropolitan hub teeming with simultaneous bouts of randomness and synchronicity.

Episode 6 The Tour Guide Convention Original Air Date: 09/13/2012 Synopsis: Speed goes on adventures with other tour guides across the country.
