= Governor's School of Engineering and Technology =

Coordinates: 40.521580°N 74.459152°W

The Governor's School of Engineering and Technology, or GSET, is one of the two programs of the Governor's School of New Jersey. Since its inception, the program has been held at Rutgers University in Piscataway, New Jersey, and aims to educate scholars in the fields of engineering and technology. This program is tuition-free and receives funding from sponsors, alumni, the state of New Jersey, Rutgers University, and others. This 4-week residential summer program is academically intense and demanding. It typically runs from the end of June to the middle/end of July. Students participate in two elective courses, along with the core courses of Physics, and Robotics. Their schedule also includes keynote speakers, tours, enrichment activities, and a research project. The research project is one of the main focuses of the program, in which students conduct research, design experiments, and write a professional research paper. On the final day, a symposium is held to showcase the research, projects, and creations.

The application process begins with nominations from the high schools. As stated on their official website, "All applicants must be nominated by their high schools. (High schools can nominate one applicant for every 325 members of their junior class. i.e. a school with 100 juniors may nominate 1 student; a school with 400 juniors may nominate 2 students; a school with 645 juniors may also nominate only 2 students). Admission to the program is very competitive. Following a competitive process at each high school in which dozens of students may express interest in attending the program, we generally receive between 300 and 400 applications from these nominees. Of the nominees, who are the best and brightest students at their respective schools, fewer than 25% generally receive offers of admission." On the application, it states: To be considered for the Governor's School of Engineering & Technology, a student must meet the following criteria:

→ The student must be a New Jersey resident and be a high school junior during the 2016-2017 school year.

→ The student must have a very strong interest in engineering and technology and be committed to the acquisition of knowledge and the pursuit of opportunities in that field.

→ The student must be willing to live on campus for the duration of the program. Saturdays and Sundays make up part of the program; there will be no weekend leaves of absence.

→ The applicant must be one of the top students in his or her school. The student should have primarily “A” grades in honors math and science classes and outstanding scores on standardized achievement tests. Students who have demonstrated very strong abilities in engineering outside the classroom can also be strong candidates for the Governor's School in spite of weaker standardized test scores. Competitive candidates often rank in the top 5% of their class and score above the 90th percentile on standardized tests. Students whose standardized test scores are below the 90th percentile but rank among the best in their school may still apply if otherwise qualified.

Application deadlines are typically in early January, and application results are revealed in early April, as of 2017. More forms are sent to accepted students for scheduling purposes. Available electives for the year of 2008 included technology math, solar power, seismic engineering, and biomedical engineering. Students choose the elective courses from a list, which changes every year. Core classes are fairly involved and consume most of a student's academic time at GSET. The robotics course is centered on the construction of robots to accomplish certain tasks. Special emphasis is placed on creativity in design. For the year of 2008, there were two robotics competitions in line-following and robotic soccer. Other classes included physics, which stressed newer ideas, such as Relativity and String Theory, over the traditional mainstays of Kinematics and Newtonian Physics. "New Tech," taught by Blase Ur, stresses the importance of security and understanding in today's increasingly technology-oriented world. During the program, students are under the authority of Residential Teaching Assistants (RTAs), who are college students pursuing engineering fields.
