= Mississippi Governor's School =

Coordinates: 33°29′35″N 88°25′7″W

- Columbus, Mississippi; United States

Information
- Type: Public boarding school
- Established: 1981
- Staff: 15 (approx)
- Faculty: 10 (approx)
- Grades: Rising 11th and 12th Graders
- Enrollment: 60 (approx)
- Campus: Mississippi University for Women

The Mississippi Governor's School is a publicly funded two-week (formerly three-week) residential summer program offered to rising juniors and seniors in the state of Mississippi. The school typically accepts around 60 students each year.

Modeled after the Governor's School of North Carolina, MGS was founded by governor William Winter in 1981. Since its first session, the program has been held annually on the campus of The Mississippi University for Women in Columbus, Mississippi.

Due to the outbreak of the global COVID-19 pandemic, the June 2020 session of the program was cancelled.

== Program description ==
The program is divided into several parts. Scholars take part a major area course, during which they spend four hours each morning learning about subjects ranging from psychology to entrepreneurship, depending on their chosen course. During the early afternoon, scholars spend two hours each day taking part in an interest area course, with subjects ranging from ballroom dancing to podcasting. After finishing their courses for the day, scholars participate in recreational activities, team-building games, and personal development activities.
