= New Jersey Scholars Program =

Summer school program from New Jersey, United States

The New Jersey Scholars Program (sometimes referred to as NJSP) is a highly prestigious selective residential summer program for academically talented high school students residing in the state of New Jersey. Historically held on the campus of The Lawrenceville School from June to July since 1977, the program is based on in-depth discussion of a seminar topic that changes biannually. There is no tuition for selected attendees; room, board, food and all other academic expenses for the five-week program are covered by private and corporate donations. Starting from the summer of 2026, the program has been held at The Peddie School.

NJSP's stated mission is to "reach out to 39 able and enthusiastic residents of New Jersey who are rising seniors and who come from a broad socio-economic, ethnic and racial cross-section of the state's population. The Program creates an intense, interdisciplinary intellectual experience that will change their lives -- to awaken in them the awareness of their potential to achieve academic excellence." In 2026, the program selected 30 students.

NJSP has been identified as a major "feeder" program for the nation's top schools, with a majority of alumni attending Ivy League and comparable institutions.

== Admissions ==
Admission to the NJ Scholars Program begins with an in-school process in which up to two students can be nominated to have their applications (consisting of an academic transcript, teacher recommendations and several essays) forwarded to the program for further consideration in early January. After a thorough vetting process, fewer than 40% of applicants are selected for semifinalist status in early March. In the next stage of the process, applicants are invited to The Peddie School for a tour of the campus and an intensive group interview with the program administrators. Applicants are notified as to their acceptance or rejection by early April.

During the COVID-19 pandemic, the program was held entirely online for two summers. There was no campus presence or tour.

Each year, 39 Scholars are selected from an applicant pool of nearly 300 candidates nominated from their schools, garnering an acceptance rate of approximately 13%.

== Instruction ==
Founded in 1977, the NJ Scholars Program was created as an attempt to provide a "dynamic learning environment" for intellectually gifted high school students in New Jersey. The interdisciplinary nature of the program allows for the Scholars to approach the seminar topic from a number of different angles, aided by professors enlisted from a wide variety of postsecondary institutions. The daily schedule starts with a morning lecture, followed by morning and afternoon seminar sessions around the "Harkness Table", which is meant to foster equal discussion among the Scholars. The remainder of the day is utilized for leisure activities, or to complete the considerable readings and work – often exceeding over 300 pages per week – assigned by the faculty. Culminating the program for the Scholars is the creation of a lengthy research paper on a specific topic of their choosing.

All student work is ungraded. At the end of the summer, each student receives an evaluation letter from the faculty member who served as advisor for the research paper.

== Student life ==
Scholars reside in one or two of the Peddie dormitories, and are free to visit the nearby city of Hightstown, New Jersey. An annual Arts Festival, first held in 1978, features performances, readings, and art exhibitions by student participants. Athletics also form a major part of the NJSP experience; the Peddie School's excellent facilities are open for use, including music rooms, tennis and basketball courts, multipurpose athletic fields, and a weight room. Other highlights of the program include a field trip to New York, an arts festival, weekend excursions to Princeton University and films. All such extracurricular expenses are covered by the program via corporate and individual donations.

== Notable alumni ==
- Elif Batuman, writer, Pulitzer Prize finalist
- Ben Zimmer, linguist and columnist

== Notable past faculty ==
- Patricia Fernandez-Kelly, sociologist
