= Rose Bud School District =

School district in Arkansas

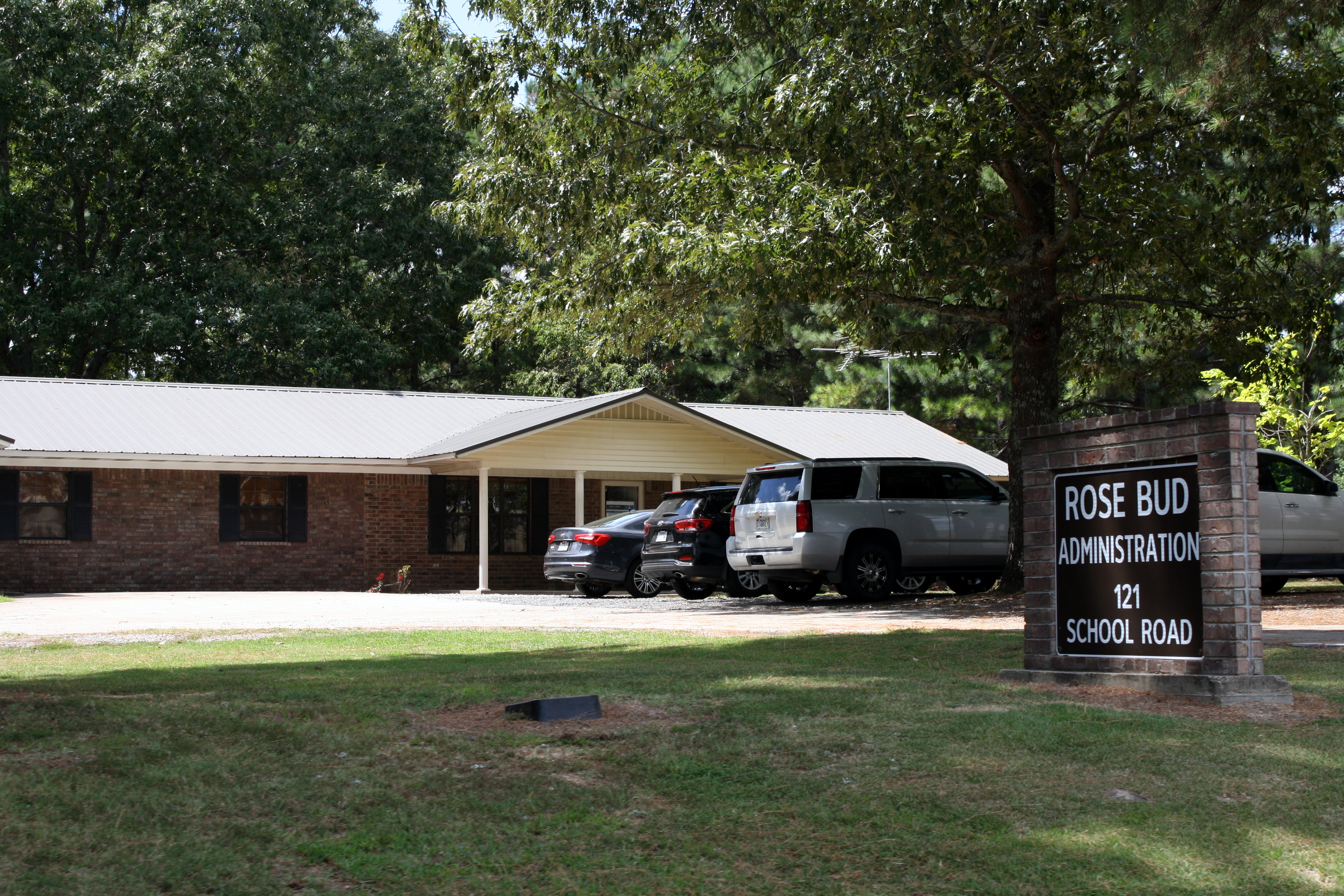

Location
- 124 School Road; Rose Bud, Arkansas 72137 United States

District information
- Established: 1914
- Superintendent: Allen Blackwell
- Accreditation(s): Arkansas Department of Education
- Schools: 2
- NCES District ID: 0512000

Students and staff
- Students: 845
- Teachers: 64.47 (on FTE basis)
- District mascot: Ramblers
- Colors: Red; White

Other information
- Website: rosebudschools.com

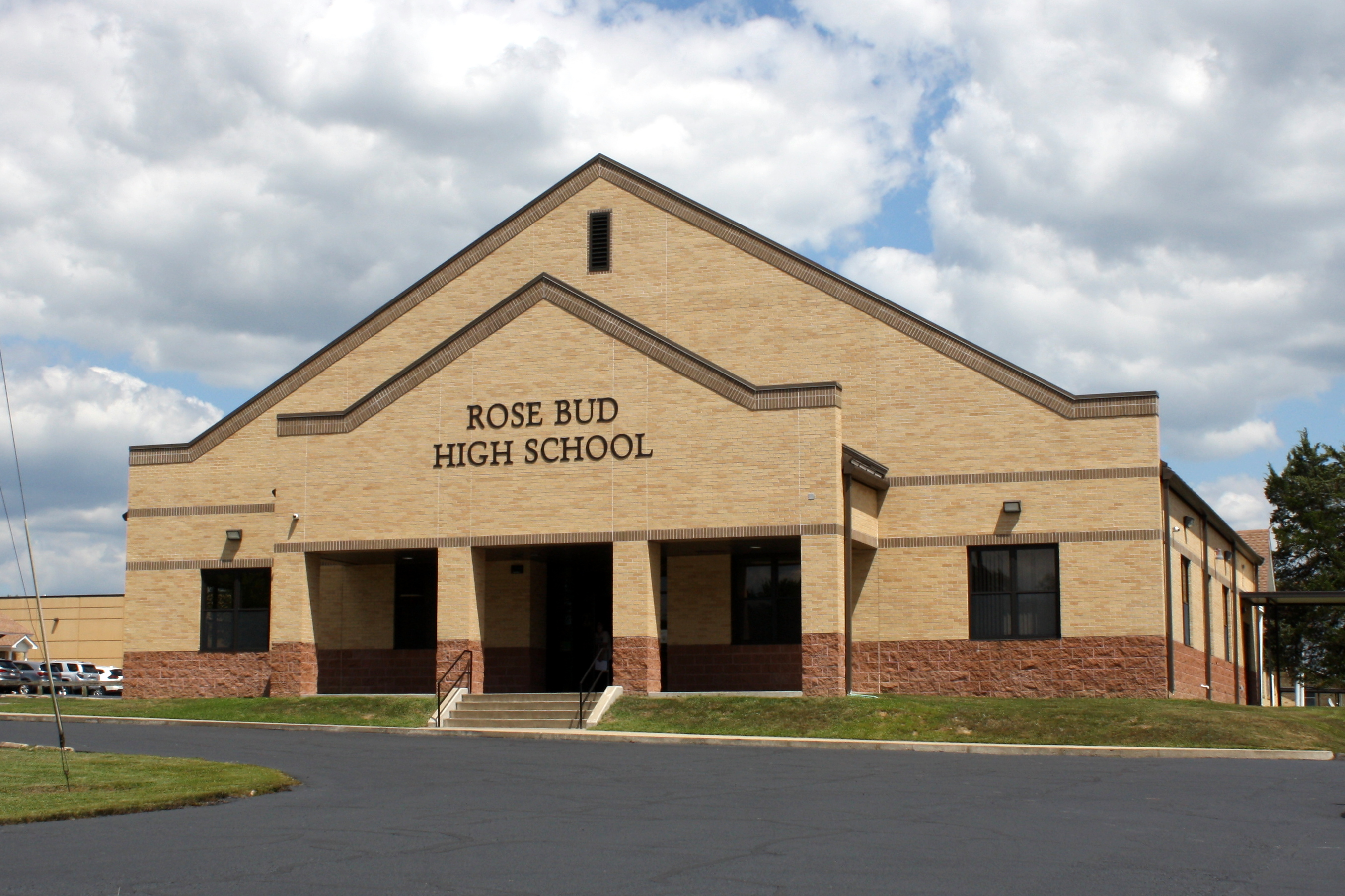
Rose Bud High School

Rose Bud School District is a public school district based in Rose Bud, Arkansas that provides comprehensive education to its students in western White County, south-central Cleburne County, and a small northeastern portion of Faulkner County.

It includes the unincorporated area of Romance.

The mascot and colors for the district and its two schools is the Ramblers in red and white.

== Schools ==
- Rose Bud High School—provides secondary education for grades 7–12.
- Rose Bud Elementary School—provides early childhood and elementary education for prekindergarten (PK) through 6.
