= Patricia Fernández-Kelly =

American social anthropologist and academic

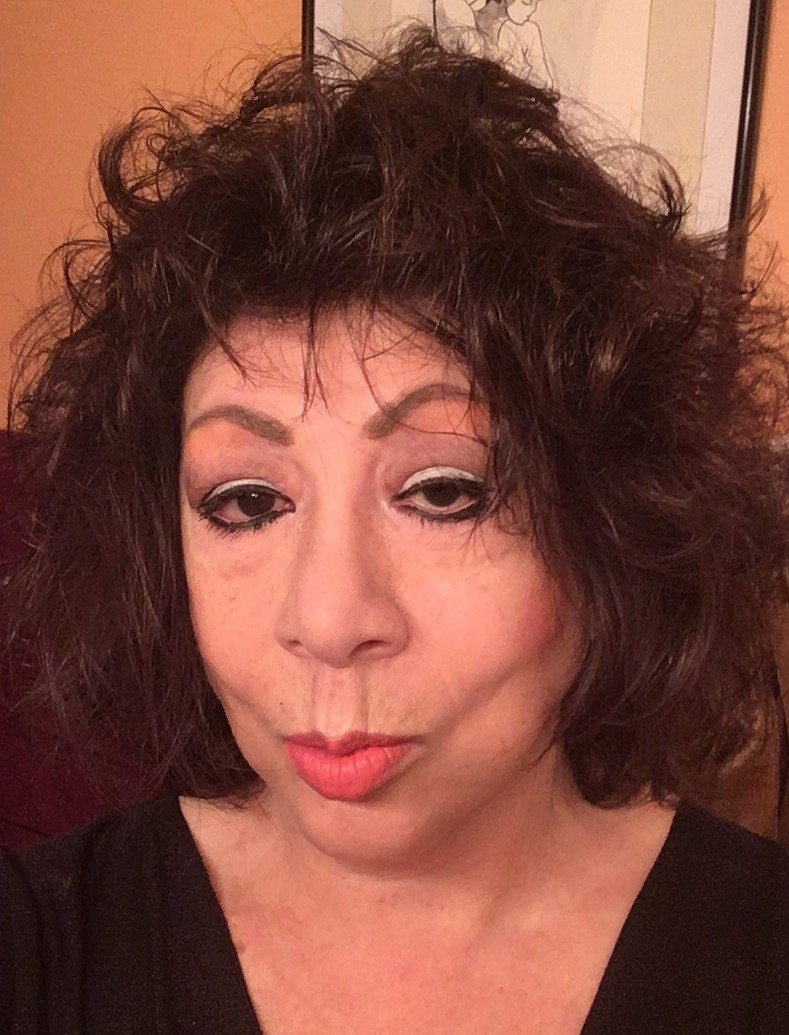
- Occupations: Social anthropologist, academic and researcher
- Awards: Emmy Award for The Global Assembly Line, American Academy of Television Arts; C. Wright Mills Finalist Award, Society for the Study of Social Problems; Distinguished Career Award, American Sociological Association

Academic background
- Education: Rutgers University(MPhil, Ph.D.)
- Alma mater: Universidad Iberoamericana; Rutgers University
- Thesis: Chavalas de Maquiladora: A Study of the composition of the Female Labor Force in Ciudad Juárez's Offshore Production Plants (1981)

Academic work
- Institutions: Princeton University

Patricia Fernández-Kelly (born in Mexico City on December 7, 1946) is a social anthropologist, academic and researcher. She is Professor of Sociology and Research Associate at the Office of Population Research at Princeton University. She is also the director of the Princeton Center for Migration and Development, associate director of the Program in American Studies, and Chair of the Board at the Latin American Legal Defense and Education Fund (LALDEF).

Fernández-Kelly has published over 100 research papers. She has conducted research on international development, the global economy, urban ethnography, race, gender, class, and women in the labor force. She is the author of For We are Sold, I and My People: Women and Industry in Mexico's Frontier and The Hero's Fight: African Americans in West Baltimore and the Shadow of the State. Her monograph on Mexico's maquiladora program, For We Are Sold, I and My People: Women and Industry in Mexico's Frontier (1983) was featured by Contemporary Sociology as one of twenty-five favorite books in the last decade of the 20th century.

With filmmaker Lorraine Gray, Fernández-Kelly co-produced the documentary The Global Assembly Line. In 2010, along with Paul DiMaggio she co-edited Art in the Lives of Immigrant Communities in the United States. Since 2005, she has been a recurrent Chair of the Board of Trustees at the Latin American Legal Defense and Education Fund (LALDEF). With Alejandro Portes, she is the co-editor of The End of Compassion: Immigrant Children in the Age of Deportations (2020).

== Education and career ==
She earned a Ph.D. (equivalency) in Art History in 1974 from Universidad Iberoamericana. Subsequently, she joined Rutgers University where she received an M.Phil. Degree in Social Anthropology in 1978, and a Ph.D. Degree in Social Anthropology in 1981.

Fernández-Kelly started her academic career in 1970 as a Professor of Art History at Universidad Iberoamericana and Universidad Nacional Autónoma de México. In 1976, she held an appointment as Instructor of Anthropology at Jersey City State College before joining Duke University as a Research Associate and the Ford Foundation as a Research Consultant in 1979. Between the years 1981 and 1996, she served as Research Associate at the University of California and Florida International University, and as Research Scientist and Research Associate at The Johns Hopkins University. In 1997, she joined Princeton University as a Lecturer, and was promoted to Senior Lecturer in Sociology in 2002, and to Professor of Sociology in 2017.

Along with academic positions, Fernández-Kelly has also held administrative appointments. In 2015, she was appointed as a Director at Center for Migration and Development (CMD), and Acting Director at Program in Latino Studies (LAO). In 2020, she served as Faculty Associate for Program in Latin American Studies, and Associate Director for Program in American Studies at Princeton University. Between 2016 and 2021 she was part of the PIIRS Migration Lab: People and cultures across Borders.

== Research ==
Fernández-Kelly's research focuses on international development, global economy, urban ethnography, race, gender, class, and women in the labor force. In the late 1970s, she conducted the first global ethnography focusing on export-processing zones in Asia and Latin America.

=== Immigration ===
Fernández-Kelly has conducted research on immigration to the United States. Between 1993 and 2004, she led several ethnographic modules related to the Children of Immigrants Longitudinal Survey (CILS) spearheaded by sociologists Alejandro Portes and Rubén G. Rumbaut. With sociologist Paul DiMaggio, she co-edited Art in the Lives of Immigrant Communities in the United States, the first publication to investigate art as part of immigrant integration processes. Fernández-Kelly coined the term expressive entrepreneurship to designate tendencies among the children of immigrants to use art as a means to circumvent the stringencies of markets in the age of neo-liberalism. She has also done work related to transnationalism, validating the topic as an emerging research field, and providing examples of immigrant political and economic transnationalism.

With Alejandro Portes and William Haller, she published a paper in 2009 regarding segmented assimilation and alternative theoretical models in the adaptation of the second generation. The paper provides a summary of theoretical frameworks developed as part of the Children of Immigrants Longitudinal Survey. She also conducted studies of the new immigrant second generation initiated in the early 1990s and completed in 2006.

With Douglas S. Massey, Fernández-Kelly investigated the role of NAFTA in the context of Mexico-U.S. Migration during roughly the same period that the bilateral treaty has been in effect. Results of that analysis revealed the slanted function of borders that were permeable for capital but restrictive for immigrants.

=== International development ===
As part of her dissertation research at Rutgers University, Fernández-Kelly designed an ethnographic study that included participant observation, the administration of a survey, and the collection of oral histories about young women employed in "maquiladoras"—i.e. directly owned subsidiaries or subcontracted operations connected to American corporations—in Ciudad Juárez, across the border from El Paso Texas. Her book, For We Are Sold, I and My People: Women and Industry in Mexico's Frontier (1983) was the result of that project. The book connects international economic development with gender inequality.

Fernández-Kelly described the relationship among changing gender definitions and economic development in the United States and Mexico. She focused on the role that the national state in both countries plays in defining the proper ambit and behavior of men and women. She also highlighted gender as a central vector regarding the organization of class hierarchies.

=== Women in the labor force ===
Fernández-Kelly has an interest in gender and international economic development; her research on the subject shows that the application of neo-liberal economic policies, starting in the 1980s resulted in the atomization of the labor force in terms of gender, with an increasing number of women employed in the formal and informal labor forces, and more and more men performing jobs with characteristics akin to those associated with women's employment.

In her Dialogue with Diane Wolff on Globalization (2001), she reviews her research on women's employment in Mexican maquiladoras and women in the garment and electronics industries in Miami (FLA) and San Diego (CA). She also studied strategic sectors in context of gender, race, and national background, and discussed the impacts of global economic integration on gender definitions.

=== The Hero's Fight ===
In The Hero's Fight: African Americans in West Baltimore and the Shadow of the State (2016), she argues that poverty in U.S. cities is qualitatively distinct from impoverishment in other parts of the world. Dispossession in America, she argues, is the effect of distorted engagement between the American state and racialized populations residing in segregated neighborhoods. She distinguishes between mainstream and liminal government institutions—the former dealing with people as citizens and market actors and the latter operating on the basis of ambivalent benevolence through policies of surveillance, containment and penalization aimed at vulnerable populations, especially those formed by African Americans.

== Awards and honors ==
- 1986 – Emmy Award for The Global Assembly Line, American Academy of Television Arts
- 2016 – C. Wright Mills Finalist Award, Society for the Study of Social Problems
- 2020 – Distinguished Career Award, American Sociological Association

== Bibliography ==
=== Books ===
- For We are Sold, I and My People: Women and Industry in Mexico's Frontier (1983) ISBN 978-0-87395-717-5
- Women, Men, and the International Division of Labor (1984) (Co-edited with June Nash ISBN 978-0-87395-683-3
- NAFTA and Beyond: Alternative Perspectives in the Study of Global Trade and Development (2007) (Co-edited with Jon Shefner) ISBN 978-1-4129-5753-3
- Out of the Shadows: Political Action and the Informal Economy in Latin America (2008) (Co-edited with Joh Shefner) ISBN 978-0-271-02751-7
- Exceptional Outcomes: Achievement in Education and Employment Among children of Immigrants (2009) (Co-edited with Alejandro Portes) ISBN 978-1-4129-7123-2
- Art in the Lives of Immigrant Communities in the United States (2010) (Co-edited with Paul DiMaggio ISBN 978-0-8135-4758-9
- Globalization and Beyond: New Examinations of Global Power and its Alternatives (2011) (Co-edited with Jon Shefner) ISBN 978-0-271-04885-7
- Health Care and Immigration: Understanding the Connections (2014) (Co-edited with Alejandro Portes) ISBN 978-1-317-96725-5
- The State and the Grassroots: Immigrant Transnational Organizations in Four Continents ((2015) (Co-edited with Alejandro Portes) ISBN 978-1-78238-734-3
- The Hero's Fight: African Americans in West Baltimore and the Shadow of the State (2016) ISBN 978-0-691-17305-4
- The End of Compassion: Children of Immigrants in the Age of Deportation (2020) (Co-edited with Alejandro Portes) ISBN 978-0-367-47265-8

=== Selected articles ===
- Portes, A., Fernandez-Kelly, P., & Haller, W. (2005). Segmented assimilation on the ground: The new second generation in early adulthood. Ethnic and racial studies, 28(6), 1000–1040.
- Fernández-Kelly, P., & Konczal, L. (2005). "Murdering the alphabet" identity and entrepreneurship among second-generation Cubans, west Indians, and central Americans. Ethnic and Racial Studies, 28(6), 1153–1181.
- Fernández-Kelly, P., & Massey, D. S. (2007). Borders for whom? The role of NAFTA in Mexico-US migration. The ANNALS of the American academy of political and social science, 610(1), 98–118.
- Portes, A., & Fernández-Kelly, P. (2008). No margin for error: Educational and occupational achievement among disadvantaged children of immigrants. The annals of the American academy of political and social science, 620(1), 12–36.
- Fernández-Kelly, P. (2008). The back pocket map: Social class and cultural capital as transferable assets in the advancement of second-generation immigrants. The Annals of the American Academy of Political and Social Science, 620(1), 116–137.
- Portes, A., Fernández-Kelly, P., & Haller, W. (2009). The adaptation of the immigrant second generation in America: A theoretical overview and recent evidence. Journal of ethnic and migration studies, 35(7), 1077–1104.
- Fernández-Kelly, P. (2010). A Howl to the Heavens. Art in the Lives of Immigrant Communities in the United States, 52–71.
- Portes, A., Fernández-Kelly, P., & Light, D. (2012). Life on the edge: immigrants confront the American health system. Ethnic and racial studies, 35(1), 3–22.
- Fernández-Kelly, P. (2015). Assimilation through transnationalism: a theoretical synthesis. In The State and the Grassroots: Immigrant Transnational Organizations in Four Continents (pp. 291–318). Berghahn Books.
- Fernández-Kelly, P. (2020). The integration paradox: contrasting patterns in adaptation among immigrant children in Central New Jersey. Ethnic and Racial Studies, 43(1), 180–198.
