= Missouri Scholars Academy =

Location
- The University of Missouri, in Columbia, Missouri; United States; 38.94511°N 92.33249°W

Information
- Type: Academic Summer Program
- Established: 1985
- Grades: Students entering 11th grade
- Age range: 15–16
- Enrollment: 330 Scholars
- Color: Two colors are chosen every year
- Website: moscholars.missouri.edu

Missouri Scholars Academy, or MSA, is a three-week residential summer program held on the University of Missouri campus in Columbia, Missouri for 330 of Missouri's gifted high school juniors. MSA exists to enrich and expand gifted education for individual students and gifted programs. MSA is a member of the National Conference of Governor's Schools. Missouri Scholars Academy should not be confused with the Missouri Student Association, with which it shares an acronym.

== History ==
Missouri Scholars Academy began in 1985, and has been held every year since. Each year is represented by a distinct pair of colors to identify its participants beyond their time at the Academy.

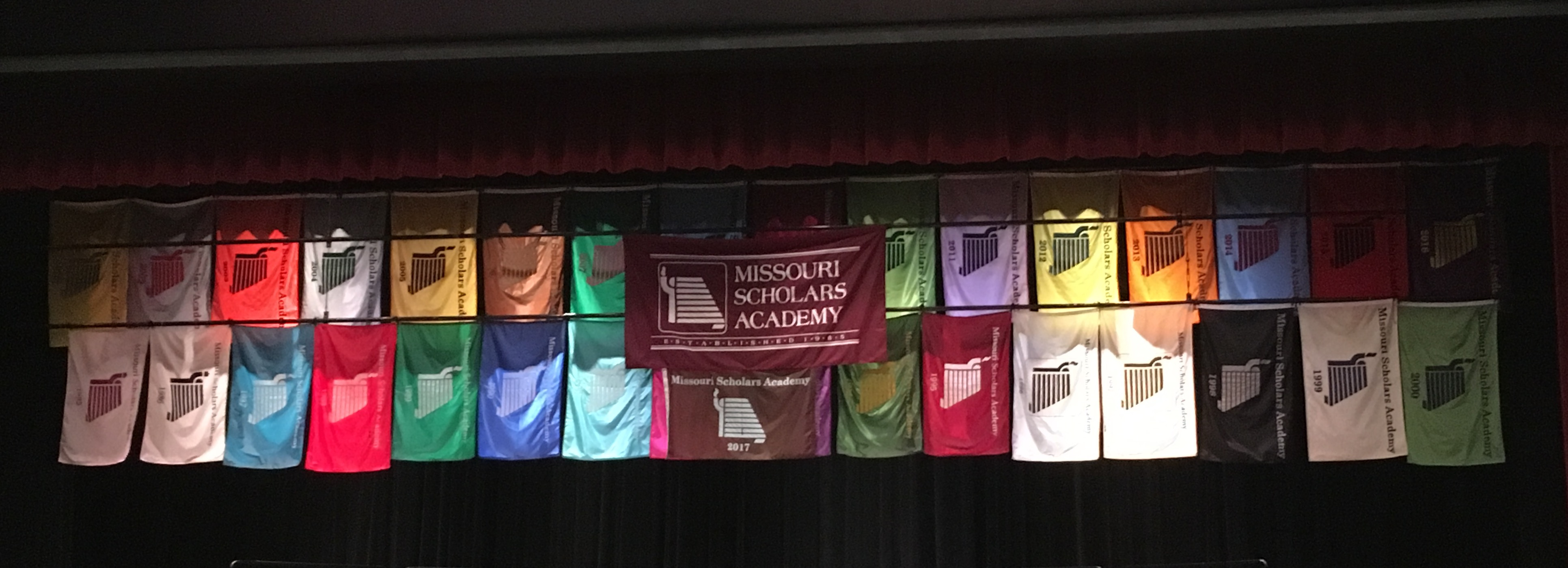
The flags of each MSA year (1985-2017).

== Classes ==
Participating scholars attend a "major" and "minor" class for three hours and one half hours per day, respectively, during the program. These classes are usually college level or experimental. Past MSAs have featured unique classes covering topics such as Japanese language and culture, Intelligence & Counterintelligence, Game theory, Time travel, Infinity, Terrorism & Counterterrorism, Education, Philosophy, Biology, Physics, Neurology, The Constitution, Censorship, Current Events, Spelunking, Creative Writing, and Art.

Participants are encouraged to choose classes of different disciplines, as one of the primary focuses of the program is to promote academic diversity and the expansion of interests in its Scholars.

== Programming ==
=== Afternoon activities ===
After minor classes end, multiple extracurricular activities are offered to continue activity and learning for scholars. Activities include, but are not limited to: Scrabble tournaments, math and logic puzzles, lectures and discussions, conducting lessons, yoga, African drumming and song, and other multidisciplinary and contemporary programs.

Notable guests of the Academy include motivational speaker Kevin Wanzer, harpist Maria Duhova, and Missouri congressman Cort VanOstran.

== Traditions ==
=== Alumni day ===
Alumni of Missouri Scholars Academy (scholars who have gone through the program) are invited back to participate in activities, including Afternoon Activities, on a weekend day during the Academy. A dance occurs; current scholars and alumni are invited.

=== Teacher appreciation day ===
Scholars are asked to invite influential teachers from one of the schools they've attended, to visit Missouri Scholars Academy for a day. Teachers are invited to attend Afternoon Activities, dinner, and Evening Programming.

== Residency ==
Participating scholars have in years past stayed in assigned rooms at the Mark Twain Residence Hall. Due to Mark Twain renovations, the academy was held in Wolpers and Johnston halls in 2012, and Hawthorn and Galena halls in 2013. In 2014, Scholars were moved back into Mark Twain after renovations were completed the previous fall. Scholars are separated by gender to different floors and given a roommate. Students are not allowed on floors of the opposite gender. Residential Assistants are also assigned to monitor and work with 16-22 scholars each. Meetings occur every night between Residential Assistants and Scholars to discuss upcoming events, rules reminders, and general questions scholars may have.

== Procedures ==
=== The Name Tag ===
For safety reasons, scholars are required to wear their name tag at all times when they are not on their floor of the residence hall. Name tags must be displayed on the upper torso.

=== Technology Policy ===
Scholars should not bring smart watches, laptop or desktop computers, DVD players, televisions, large stereos, gaming consoles, or walkie-talkies. Scholars will have access to computers and other electronic equipment as a part of their Academy activities, and should not bring these items with them. Small stereos, iPods, and other small music players are allowed.

== Funding ==
Funding for the Academy varies from year to year. The state of Missouri has budgeted money for Missouri Scholars Academy and Missouri Fine Arts Academy in the past but it has fluctuated for both programs.

Philanthropic donation to Missouri Scholars Academy are accepted and are tax-deductible. The Gifted Association of Missouri also is a regular contributor to funding to the Academy.
