= Governor's School of Texas =

The Governor's School of Texas, formerly the Texas Honors Leadership Program (THLP), is a summer program for academically talented high school students from Texas, who have completed their sophomore or junior years. The program is a member of the National Conference of Governor's Schools. 100 students are selected each year and scholars, who are nominated by their senior counselors, are invited to serve as junior counselors for the following year. Held at Lamar University in Beaumont, Texas, the School is an intensive three-week residential program. The program's curriculum is designed to develop skills in creativity, problem-solving, leadership, negotiation and conflict resolution, higher-level thinking, research and study skills and ethical decision-making. As an incentive to foster creativity, the program includes no grades or academic credit.

After classes conclude each afternoon, scholars participate in artistic and athletic activities, including drama, dance, instrumental ensemble, tennis, cross country, strength training, basketball, football, volleyball and cricket.

== History ==
The Texas Education Agency (TEA) established the Office of Gifted and Talented Education in 1976 and developed the first state plan for Gifted Education in 1981 and funded the Texas Governor's Honors Program. From 1986 until 1988, the program was held at the University of Texas at Austin, and in 1989, the program was not held. The Texas Commissioner of Education Dr. Tom Kirby asked Dr. Sisk at Lamar University to plan and develop a Governor's Honors Program, and from 1990–1999 the Texas Governor's Honors Program was held at Lamar. Funding from the Texas Education Agency was withdrawn for 2000–2002; however, Lamar University decided to continue the program by seeking funding from private foundations and individual donors to support the program; and the program was renamed the Texas Honors Leadership Program. In 2008, once again under funding by the TEA, the program reemerged as the Texas Governor's School. As of 2010, there are 4 Governor's School programs in the state of Texas.

== Lamar University ==
The Texas Governor's School for Leadership Development at Lamar University in Beaumont is a free three week residential program with focus on leadership in the Humanities, Language Arts, Mathematics, Fine Arts, and Science. Eligible participants are Texas residents who complete the sophomore or junior year of high school, is enrolled in a tenth or eleventh grade state approved program for gifted students or was in a state approved honors or advanced placement course; or displays outstanding achievement and performance.

== Texas A&M University-College Station ==
The Texas Governor's School in Arts and Humanities for Urban Leadership at Texas A&M University in College Station is a free three-week, intensive residential summer educational program. The program is open to high achieving high school students who complete the sophomore or junior year of high school. "High Achieving" must be documented in the application essays by any one or more of the following: top ten percent of high school class; active participation in a gifted and talented program; outstanding scores on achievement tests or TAKS test; leadership in school organizations; leadership in community organizations; significant accomplishments in the arts and humanities.

== University of North Texas ==
In 2003, another Governor's school, focusing on science and technology, The Texas Governor's School in Mathematics and Science, was established at the University of North Texas in Denton. A 3-week program, the School focuses on enriching and developing a student's abilities in science and technology as well as exploring the impacts of these fields on past, present, and future societies including ethics, history, and the arts.

== Texas A&M University-Corpus Christi ==
In 2009, the Texas Higher Education Commission awarded a 3-year grant to Texas A&M University in Corpus Christi to establish a 3-week residential summer program for 100 gifted and talented high school students who are interested in teaching the subjects of science and math. The Governor's Academy for Teaching Excellence (GATE) will commence on July 12. Located on the gulf of Mexico, the Island University's program features excursions on research vessels, field trips to the Texas State Aquarium and the national seashore, and the exclusive "kids college" school within a school. You can link to GATE at: gate.tamucc.edu.
