= Timothy Levitch =

American poet

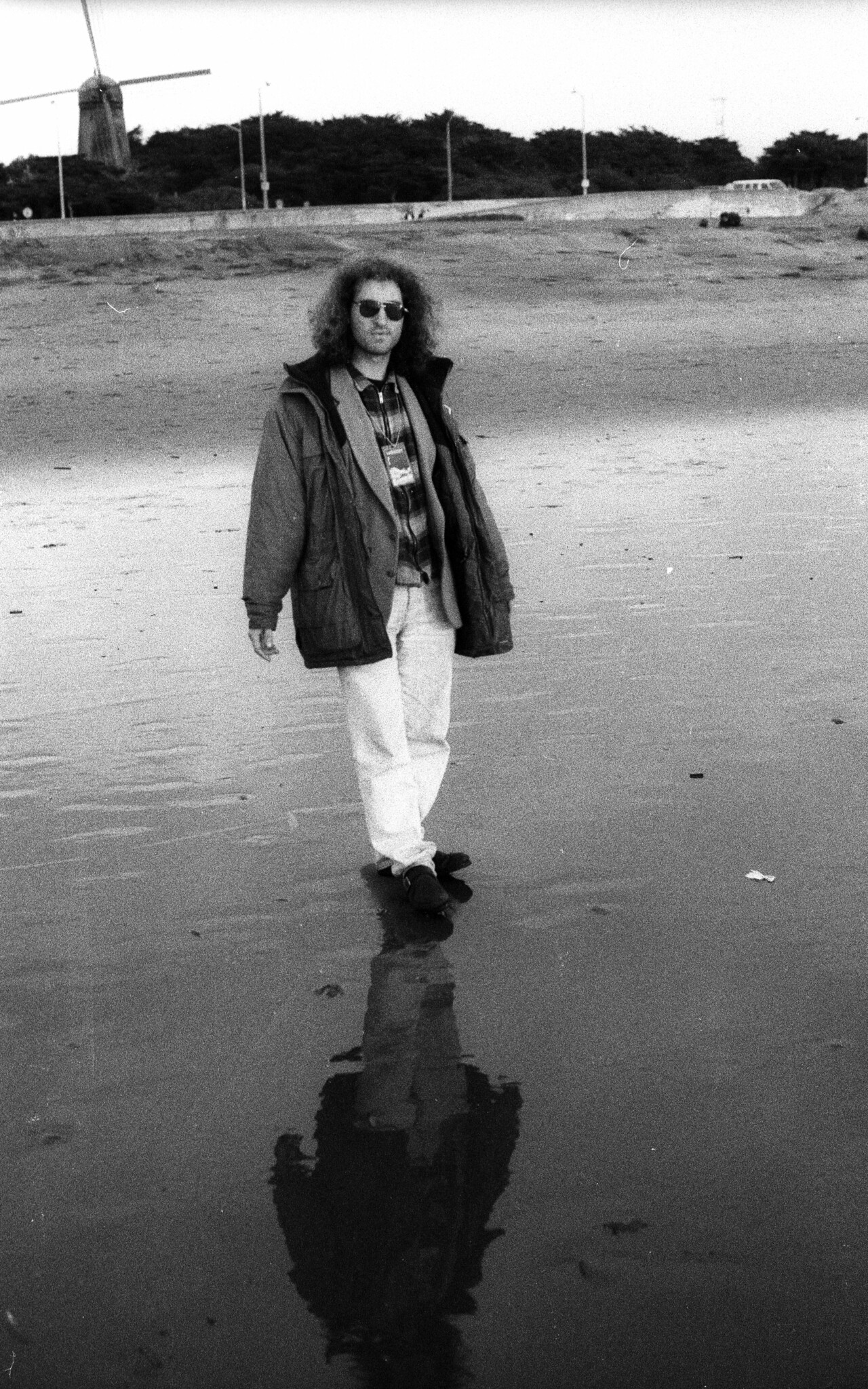
- Levitch in 2016
- Born: July 9, 1970 (age 56); New York City, New York, U.S.

Timothy "Speed" Levitch (/ˈlɛvɪtʃ/; born July 9, 1970) is an American actor, tour guide, poet, speaker, philosopher, author and voice actor. The name "Speed" was given to him by a childhood friend in high school. Levitch has appeared in multiple films and has had poetic and philosophical works published in books and periodicals.

== Biography ==
Levitch was born July 9, 1970, in New York City. He mostly grew up in the Riverdale neighborhood of the Bronx, where he attended the Horace Mann School. When he was 12, his parents bought a house in Westchester County, New York, and he was briefly a suburbanite. He longed to return to New York City and eventually did.

In 1992 he received his tour guide license from the Central Park Conservancy. He later took a position with Apple and Gray Line Tours as a tour bus guide. He soon attracted a cultlike following, due not only to his fast talking style, but also for his obvious love of portraying his native city in psychedelic terms and with passionate philosophical ideas. Levitch's cult spread beyond New York when he became the subject of the 1998 documentary The Cruise. In 2000 he was a citizen of the art project Quiet, We Live in Sane.

In 2007, Levitch moved to Kansas City and started a tour business called "Taste of KC."

In 2012, Levitch premiered a new documentary video series, Up to Speed, on its own Hulu channel. Directed by Richard Linklater, the series takes viewers on virtual tours of American cities, conversing with inanimate objects like San Francisco's Golden Fire Hydrant and Chicago's original Haymarket Riot memorial.

Levitch is a member of The Ongoing Wow, a band in which he does spoken word over improvised music with Gals Panic and The Sinus Show member Jerm Pollet.

== Filmography ==
- The Cruise (1998), as himself.
- Anatomy of a Scene
- Scotland, Pa. (2001), Hector. (Hippie #2)
- Waking Life (2001) (voice), Lunatic, as himself (credited as Speed Levitch)
- School of Rock (2003), Waiter.
- Live from Shiva's Dance Floor (2003), as himself.
- Video Capture Device (2004), as himself.
- Stroker & Hoop (2004) TV Series (voice), Hoop. (credited as Speed Levitch)
- Shooting Vegetarians (2005)
- Xavier: Renegade Angel (2007) (voice), Puggler, the Punk Rock Juggler. (credited as Speed Levitch)
- 1 Giant Leap: What About Me? (2008), as himself. (credited as Speed Levitch)
- We Live in Public (2009), as himself (A citizen of Quiet)
- Up to Speed (2012), as himself.
- High Maintenance (2019) TV Series, as himself. (credited as Timothy Speed Levitch; Season 3, Episode 9 "Cruise")
- The Shivering Truth (2020) (voice), Dr. Bodgey (credited as Timothy "Speed" Levitch)

== Bibliography ==
- Levitch, Timothy "Speed" (2002). Speedology: Speed on New York on Speed. Context Books. ISBN 1-893956-29-6.
