= Governor's School of North Carolina =

The Governor's School of North Carolina
- Governor's School of North Carolina Logo
- Greensboro, NC (GS West), Raleigh, NC (GS East), North Carolina; United States

Information
- Type: Public boarding school
- Established: 1963
- Oversight: North Carolina Department of Public Instruction, Exceptional Children Division
- Directors: Rodney Allen (GS Coordinator), Bob Davis (GS West), and Laura Sam (GS East)
- Faculty: 120 (approx)
- Grades: Rising 11th And 12th Graders Only
- Enrollment: 650 (approx)
- Campuses: Greensboro College (GS West), Meredith College (GS East)
- Website: www.ncgsf.com

The Governor's School of North Carolina (GS, GSNC) is a publicly funded residential summer program for intellectually gifted high school students in the state of North Carolina, United States. North Carolina's Governor's School was the first such program in the United States, and has given rise to similar programs for gifted students in many other states.

== Program description ==
Governor's School enrolls approximately 800 students each summer, split between two host campuses. As of 2024, half attend Governor's School West (GSW) at Greensboro College, and half attend Governor's School East (GSE) at Meredith College in Raleigh. Governor's School is a program of the North Carolina Department of Public Instruction.

Governor's School serves students in public, private, and home schools. Most students are rising seniors in high school, though students from some arts areas may be rising juniors. Students who attend Governor's School are nominated by their school or school system and selected on the basis of grades, test scores, an application essay and, for arts students, an audition. Students are accepted for a primary course of study, known as Area I, in which they will spend most of their class time. Area I disciplines include the following: academic areas of English, Spanish, mathematics, natural science and social science; artistic areas of art, choral music, dance, drama, and instrumental music. Each course emphasizes contemporary texts, compositions, artistic expressions, issues, and ideas in their respective disciplines. All students attend two additional areas of study outside of their primary area as well as optional and required seminars and performances. Area II courses cover a variety of questions and ideas from the epistemological branch of philosophy. In Area III classes, students attempt to ground what they are learning in their Area I and II classes in their own personal experience through the lens of ethics and values.

== Governor's School history ==
=== Founding ===
The program began in 1963 as an education initiative promoted by Gov. Terry Sanford and conceptualized by John Ehle, a member of his staff. The idea was based on educational principles concerning gifted education that were prominent in the 1950s. An early consultant in Governor's School's design and curriculum was Dr. James J. Gallagher, author of Teaching the Gifted Child (1951) and over 80 other works on gifted education. Dr. Gallagher's work emphasized the need for different educational methods for gifted students that were not available in public schools, and the importance of creativity and leadership as aspects of giftedness. The goal of Governor's School, therefore, was to advance the education of North Carolina's brightest students, with the goal of encouraging them to become gifted, creative leaders in all aspects of science, mathematics, art, sociology, and literature. This was done partially in hopes of challenging the technological advancements being made in the Cold-War era Soviet Union, but also with an eye to bringing corporations to North Carolina to provide jobs in emerging technologies such as computers, space exploration, telecommunications, and biomedical research.

The first session was funded by a grant from the Carnegie Corporation of New York and an association of business leaders from Winston-Salem, NC. The first Governor's School class of 400 students met in June, 1963 on the campus of Salem College in Winston-Salem, NC. Instructors were drawn mainly from college professors. Though North Carolina's public schools would not be officially desegregated until 1968, students of all races have been accepted to Governor's School since its inception.

=== Establishment and growth ===
Governor's School was funded by the Carnegie Corporation and local business for a second year, but received support from the NC Legislature beginning in 1965 and continuing (with a single exception) to this day. While the subject matter changed with the times, the governing philosophies of gifted education remained focused on differential education for the gifted. The early curriculum was expressed in a document entitled Opening Windows to the Future, written by H. Michael Lewis with input from GS instructors.

In 1968, actor, educator, and playwright James Lee (Jim) Bray became Director of the Governor's School, a position he would hold until 1995.

In light of the expanding population of North Carolina and the growing impact of research and development corporations in the state's financial success, Governor Jim Hunt called for Governor's School to be expanded to a second campus in 1978. The second GS program was held on the campus of St. Andrews Presbyterian College in Laurinburg. This doubled the number of students to 800. With the opening of this campus, the program in Winston-Salem was referred to as GS West, while Laurinburg was GS East. Both campuses held essentially the same program, prompting the NC Department of Public Instruction to declare that Governor's School was one school with two campuses.

Governor's School East moved to Meredith College in Raleigh for the 2000 session, where it is still held. In 2019, Governor's School West moved from Salem College to High Point University in High Point. GSW was again moved, in 2022 to Winston Salem State University and in 2024 to Greensboro College.

While faculty and subject matter have changed over time, Governor's School remained basically unaltered from 1978 until 2009.

=== Support organizations ===
In response to proposed budget cuts, and in celebration of its 25th year, Jim Bray and the faculty at GS West organized a meeting of GS alumni to show legislators the enduring success of the program. Organized by long-time campus activities director JoAnne North Goetz, several hundred alumni met in 1987 to show their support for the program. During this meeting, they organized the North Carolina Governor's School Alumni Association. The Alumni Association holds annual Alumni Day reunions on both campuses, and supports Governor's School through donations and public awareness.

In 1993, the Alumni Association spun off a sister organization, the NC Governor's School Foundation. The Foundation is a non-profit charitable organization that supports the mission of Governor's School through direct financial donations. The GS Foundation is a non-profit 501(c)(3) organization.

In 2020, the Alumni Association merged into the GS Foundation in order to expand opportunities for alumni.

=== Budget challenges ===
With the economic issues of the 2008 financial collapse, the North Carolina legislature began a series of cuts to the Governor's School program. In 2009, the legislature passed a general cut to the Governor's School budget, forcing the program to drop from 800 students to 600, and also began charging a $500 tuition to attend. Prior to that time, Governor's School had been at no cost to the students. Since 2010, the Governor's School Foundation has offered scholarships to economically disadvantaged students to offset the tuition cost.

Citing continued budget issues, the NC Legislature cut all funding for Governor's School in June, 2011. With this decision, the Governor's School of North Carolina was effectively ended, though the legislature did allow the Department of Public Instruction to keep the School open as a tuition-funded program. DPI made it clear from the beginning that they would not hold GS if it had to be supported by full tuition of about $2100 per student.

This prompted the Governor's School Foundation into action to save the 2012 program and give alumni time to show legislators the economic power of Governor's School and its positive impact on the state's economy. Working with the Governor's School Alumni Association, and with support from the Department of Public Instruction and the NC State Board of Education, the GS Foundation was able to raise $700,000 in less than six months - enough to keep both Governor's School campuses open for the 2012 session with 550 students, although with a reduction in duration to five weeks. At the same time, an outpouring of support from alumni and business leaders across the state urged legislators to restore GS funding. In June 2012, the Legislature voted to restore sufficient funding to keep both GS campuses open with 600 students for a five-week session.

On July 14, 2012, the NC Governor's School Alumni Association held a celebration of 50 years of Governor's School, the culmination of the effort to save the program.

== Notable attendees ==
- Jeanetta Arnette, Actress best known as Miss Meara from Head of the Class
- Johnnie W. Barnes, II, Lieutenant/Director for District of Columbia Metropolitan Police Department, Congressional Gold Medal Recipient
- Alex Castellanos, conservative political commentator and media consultant
- Dan Clodfelter, North Carolina state Senator and former Mayor of Charlotte, North Carolina
- Steve Cotton, Video game developer best known for award-winning Rainbow Six, Halo, Destiny, & Marathon
- Ariana DeBose 2022 Winner, Best Supporting Actress (Academy Award, BAFTA, Golden Globe, Screen Actors Guild)
- Anoop Desai, singer
- Chad Dickerson, CEO, Etsy.com
- Emersen Fitch, Actress and model
- Ben Folds, pianist, composer, RIAA Gold Record winner, and member of NC Music Hall of Fame
- Rhiannon Giddens, Grammy-winning musician, 2017 MacArthur Fellow (Genius Grant)
- Lois Patricia “Peaches” Hauser Golding, Lord-Lieutenant of the city and county of Bristol, England.
- Wayne Goodwin, Former North Carolina Insurance Commissioner, Chairperson of the NC Democratic Party
- Alexander Isley, designer and educator
- Ken Jeong, physician, comedian, and actor, The Hangover, Dr. Ken
- Jeanne Jolly, musician, songwriter
- Loretta Lynch, Attorney General of the United States of America, 2015-2017
- William S. McArthur, NASA Astronaut
- John Howell Morrison, composer
- Nassib Nassar, WWW search engine pioneer and classical pianist. Winner of the 2014 American Prize in Piano
- Joshua Park, Broadway actor
- Ezra Moore, OCU Student
- Patsy Pease, award-winning actress, (Kimberly Brady on Days of Our Lives)
- Chuck Robbins, CEO, Cisco Systems
- Tom Smith, inductee Down Beat Jazz Education Hall of Fame.
- Emily Spivey, Emmy-winning screenwriter/producer. Writer for Saturday Night Live. Writer/Producer of NBC comedy Up All Night
- Ted Tally, Oscar-winning screenwriter of The Silence of the Lambs
- Mel Tomlinson, dancer, actor, choreographer.
- Ira David Wood III, actor, playwright, and director
- Jamie Wooten, Writer/Producer "The Golden Girls" NBC; Playwright
- Harrison Dixon, Member of Tony's Room Gang
- Aryaman Bana, Member of Tony's Room Gang

== See also ==
- Arkansas Governor's School, similar program in Arkansas
- National Conference of Governor's Schools, a national organization of similar schools in the United States.
