= Arkansas Governor's School =

Coordinates: 35°17′40″N 93°08′02″W

- Russellville, Arkansas; United States

Information
- Type: Public boarding school
- Established: 1979
- Oversight: Administrator of Programs for the Gifted and Talented, Arkansas Department of Education
- Faculty: 40 (approx)
- Grades: Rising 12th Graders
- Enrollment: 400 (approx)
- Campus: Arkansas Tech

The Arkansas Governor's School (also known as Arkansas Governor's School for the Gifted and Talented or AGS) is a publicly funded four-week (formerly six-week) residential summer program offered to rising seniors in the state of Arkansas. The school typically accepts around 400 students each year.

Modeled after the Governor's School of North Carolina, AGS was founded by governor Bill Clinton in 1979.

From 1979 until 2018, the program took place on the grounds of Hendrix College in Conway, Arkansas.

On September 13, 2018, the Arkansas Board of Education voted to move the program to Arkansas Tech in Russellville, Arkansas. This decision was met with high criticism from past alumni, staff, and parents with over 2,500 signing a petition against the campus change. The program has since been housed at Arkansas Tech for the 2019–2024 sessions.

== Program description ==
=== At Hendrix College ===
The Hendrix curriculum for AGS was broken up into three areas:

- Area I, emulating a college major. Students are accepted into one of eight areas of study: English/Language Arts, Visual Arts, Choral Music, Instrumental Music, Mathematics, Natural Science, Social Science, and Drama.
- Area II, also known as conceptual development, which focuses on critical thinking skills and high level discussions. Many Area II teachers majored in philosophy, political science, and English.
- Area III, also known as personal and social development. Topics covered in Area III classes include growth mindset, emotional intelligence, and stress management.

There are two other "areas," Area IV and Area V. Area IV consists of the residential staff (Resident Assistants, or "RAs," as well as the Hall Directors of the various dormitories). Area V consists of the administrative and office staff that head the whole program.

There are two required speakers each week. Previous speakers include Rudy Giuliani, Michael Shermer, Phyllis Schlafly, Temple Grandin, James Loewen. During the program's early years, then-governor Bill Clinton and his wife, Hillary Clinton gave speeches and held small meetings in order to improve the normal school experiences.

One film is required each week to supplement Area II discussions, the first of which is usually Koyaanisqatsi. Past screenings include The Truman Show, 13th, (Dis)Honesty: The Truth About Lies, and Hotel Rwanda.

Each day, there are several extra activities occurring after Area I and Area II classes, named after the typical time they occur at: "4:10s" or "6:10s." These cover a wide variety of topics and activities, from Middle Eastern Conflict to Quidditch.

=== At Arkansas Tech ===
The Arkansas Tech curriculum follows a similar three area paradigm, with a focus on linking technology in the past, present, and future.

- Area I encompasses the same eight areas of study, each incorporating technology studies into their classes.
- Area II now focuses on the paradigm of the "network," looking into the ethical and philosophical implications of technology in modern times. Area II was composed of several sections, each taught by a different instructor and imparting a unique perspective.
- Area III explores the role of technology in society, both politically and socially.

== The Guiding Hand ==
Because of the school's link to Bill Clinton, a film entitled The Guiding Hand was created as anti-Clinton propaganda during the 1992 presidential election. The film accused the school of brainwashing students, saying that one girl had to be "deprogrammed" for two years. Also in the film is an unidentified student who makes several false claims about the school, including one statement saying that there was a required course called "Views of Man"; in actuality, this was a course at Hendrix College, not AGS. In the last week of the program, the film is studied by students and analyzed for logical fallacies using their newfound Area II knowledge.
