= Nancy A. Roseman =

Former President of Dickinson College

28th President of Dickinson College
- In office 2013–2016
- Preceded by: William Durden
- Succeeded by: Margee Ensign

Personal details
- Spouse: Lori van Handel
- Education: Smith College, Oregon State University

Nancy A. Roseman was the 28th president of Dickinson College in Carlisle, Pennsylvania. A professor of biology, she was dean of the college at Williams College before being selected as Dickinson's first female president in 2013. On 11 April 2016, she announced her resignation as president, effective 30 June 2016.

== Early life ==
Roseman was born in New Brunswick, New Jersey and graduated from Metuchen High School in Metuchen in 1976. She graduated from Smith College in 1980, and earned her doctorate in microbiology at Oregon State University in 1987.

== Career ==
She joined the Williams College faculty in 1991. She taught and conducted research on the viral enzyme dUTP diphosphatase. She was dean of the college from 2000 to 2007 and led the construction of Williams' new student center. Subsequently she was director of the Williams-Exeter Programme at Exeter College, Oxford. Williams awarded her an honorary doctorate in 2013.

In 2012, Dickinson College chose Roseman to become the 28th president of the school, succeeding retiring president William Durden on 28 September 2013. She was Dickinson's first female and first openly gay president. The College announced that Roseman would step down as President on July 1, 2016.

She is married to Lori van Handel.
