= Clarke Center =

1994 establishments in Pennsylvania

The Clarke Center is an organization at Dickinson College in Carlisle, Pennsylvania, USA, which organizes campus lectures, symposia, and events. A gift from trustee Henry D. Clarke, Jr. helped establish the Center in 1994.

Clarke Center programming typically focuses on interdisciplinary issues and aims to enrich students' academic experiences outside of the classroom. Each year, events center on an annual theme. Past themes include:Democratization (1994–95), Race & Ethnicity: The Politics of Identity (1995–96), Environmental Sustainability (1996–97), Citizenship (1997-98), Education, Power, and Responsibility (1998–99), Corporations and Globalization (1999-2000), War (2000-01), Crossing Borders (2001–02; 2002–03), For Richer, For Poorer; Globalization Under Attack (2003–04), Religion and Political Power (2004–05), and Memory (2005-2006). Student project managers make up part of the Clarke Center staff, and design publicity for events, write campus news articles and press releases, interview speakers, and staff events. The Clarke Center has hosted over 400 speakers since its founding, and all events are free and open to the public.
