= The Gambia and the United Nations =

Republic of The Gambia

United Nations membership
- Membership: Full member
- Since: 21 September 1965
- UNSC seat: Non-permanent
- Permanent Representative: Muhammadou M. O. Kah

Gambia is a member of the United Nations. The Gambia gained independence from the United Kingdom in 1965, becoming a sovereign member state of the Commonwealth of Nations. Dawda Jawara served as the country's first Prime Minister. Muhammadou M.O. Kah is the Ambassador Extraordinary and Plenipotentiary of the Gambia to Switzerland and Permanent representative to United Nations Office at Geneva, WTO and other International Organisations in Switzerland.

In 2022, The Gambia was the 64th largest contributor of uniformed personnel to UN peacekeeping missions, with 98 peacekeepers, including 31 women. These peacekeepers serve in a variety of roles, including military staff officers, individual police officers, and experts on mission. The Gambia also contributes peacekeepers to five UN peacekeeping missions:

- MINUSMA (Mali)
- MONUSCO (Democratic Republic of Congo)
- MINUSCA (Central African Republic)
- UNISFA (Abyei)
- UNITAMS (Sudan)

These missions are all located in Africa, and they are all facing complex and challenging security situations.

The Gambia served as a non-permanent member of the United Nations Security Council for a two-year term from 1998 to 1999. The United Nations is helping The Gambia achieve its national development goals, which are in line with the Sustainable Development Goals.

== See also ==
- List of countries by number of UN peacekeepers
- List of members of the United Nations Security Council
