= James Andrew McCauley =

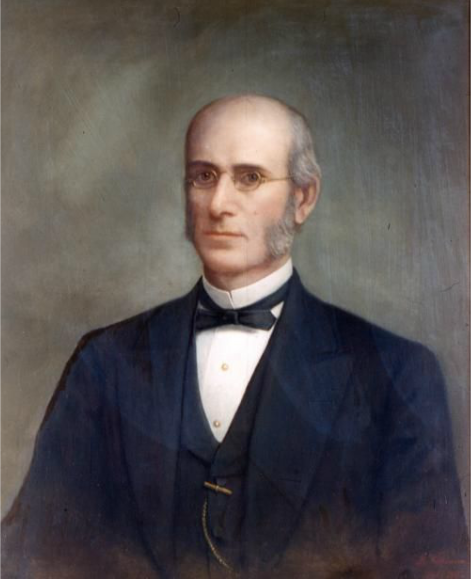
Dr. James Andrew McCauley, President of Dickinson College, 1872–1888

Signature of James Andrew McCauley

James Andrew McCauley (1822-1896) was a minister of the Methodist Episcopal Church and served as President of Dickinson College in Carlisle, Pennsylvania from 1872 to 1888.

== Early life ==
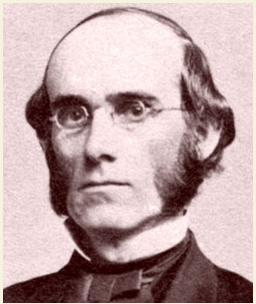
Rev. James Andrew McCauley, c. 1865

James Andrew McCauley was born on October 7, 1822, in Cecil County, Maryland, to Daniel and Elizabeth McCauley. His early education was lacking, but he acquired the English rudiments and had a great fondness for books. His family removed to Baltimore, and at the age of 17, he worked in a mercantile house. After two years, he took a preparatory course at the classical academy of the scholar Rev. John H. Dashiell in Baltimore, Maryland, before entering Dickinson College in Carlisle, Pennsylvania, as a freshman in September 1844. He was elected to the Union Philosophical Society and he graduated from Dickinson College with highest honors in 1847. For the next two years he was a private tutor for one of the oldest families in Maryland. During college, McCauley decided the Christian ministry was his destiny vocation, and in 1850 he was admitted to the ministry of the Methodist Episcopal Church at the session of the Baltimore Conference. At the session, that body decided to establish a secondary school of high grade for women, and McCauley was assigned the responsibility of inaugurating and conducting the enterprise. Shortly following this, he married Rachel Moore Lightner on July 8, 1851, with whom he had a daughter, Fanny. The secondary school for women was a notable success, but at the end of four years McCauley relinquished the trust on account of impaired health. After brief rest he entered the pastorate, and for eighteen years had some of the most important charges in the city of Baltimore and Washington. In 1867, McCauley was awarded a Doctor of Divinity degree (D.D.) from his alma mater Dickinson College, where he served as a Trustee from 1869 to 1872. McCauley was residing in Washington and presiding elder of the district, when called to the presidency of Dickinson College in 1872.

== Dickinson College ==
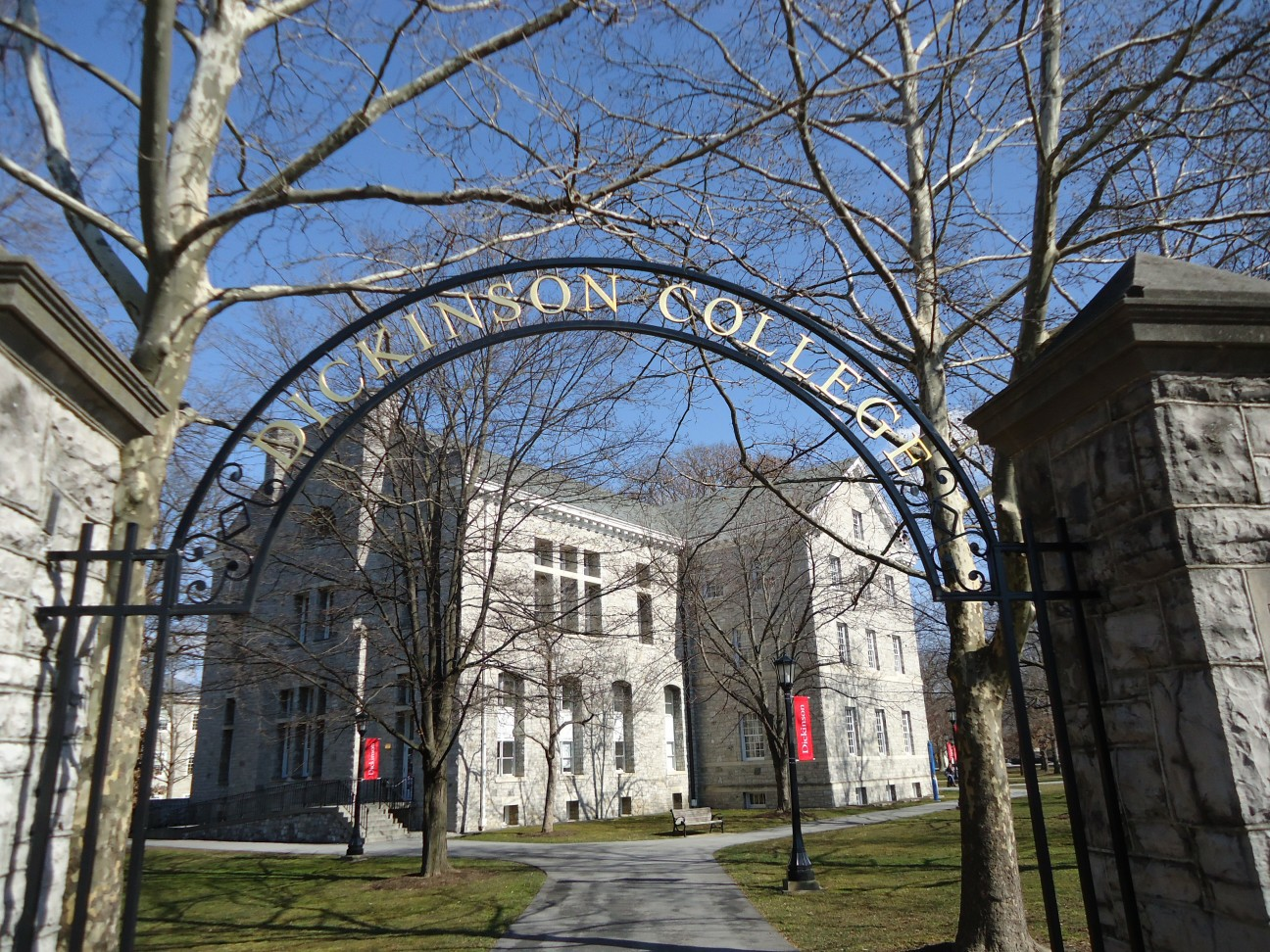
Dr. James Andrew McCauley served as President of Dickinson College in Carlisle, Pennsylvania, from 1872 to 1888.

In 1872, Dr. McCauley accepted the position as the fourteenth President of Dickinson College, remaining as such for the next sixteen years, until 1888. At the time McCauley assumed the role of President, Dickinson had declined during the Civil War and patronage and income had waned. Buildings were unsightly from want of repair, and the feeling of distress was causing many to despond with regard to the future. But McCauley faced the difficulties with determination and during his tenure increased endowments, built new facilities, enhanced curricula and enlarged faculty. In September 1872, McCauley authorized the founding of the Dickinsonian, the college newspaper still in production. McCauley undertook an expansion of the campus that was unprecedented in the life of the institution in curricula, faculty and facilities. McCauley is also credited with admitting Zatae Leola (Longsdorff) Straw, the first female graduate of Dickinson College.

== Carlisle Indian School ==
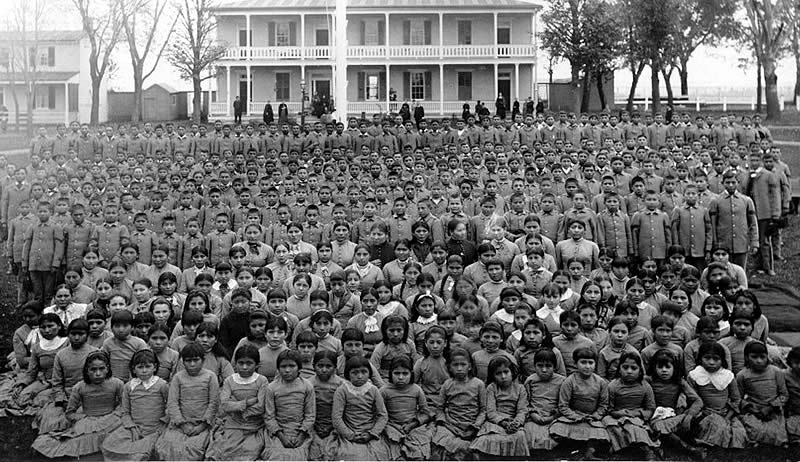
In 1879, Dr. McCauley began an association between Dickinson College and the Carlisle Indian School that lasted almost forty years.

In 1879, Dr. McCauley began an association between Dickinson College and the Carlisle Indian School that continued almost forty years. The Indian School was less than two miles from the campus of Dickinson College in Carlisle, Pennsylvania. The long association began upon the opening of the Indian School at Carlisle Barracks when Dr. McCauley led the first worship service. It was Mrs. Pratt, wife of Superintendent Captain Richard Henry Pratt, who had initiated the contact between the Indian School and Dickinson. Upon Pratt's absence one Sunday, Mrs. Pratt wrote to President McCauley and requested his aid as a minister which he graciously accepted. The relationship did not stop there, with Captain Pratt noting that "from that time forward Dr. McCauley became an advisor and most valued friend to the school" and "we had the advantage of contacting and contending with our distinguished neighbor, Dickinson College, with its more than a century of success in developing strong and eminent men to fill the highest places in our national life." Thereafter, Dr. McCauley helped Pratt to develop a Board of Trustees and a Board of Visitors composed of different heads of leading national educational institutions and wealthy donors. The Indian school was only partly supported by government funds and was heavily dependent upon private philanthropy. Dickinson College professors served as chaplains and special faculty to the Indian School. Professor Charles Francis Himes, Dr. George Edward Reed, Stephen Baird and Joshua Lippincott fostered the relationship between the institutions through religious services, advisory meetings, lectures and commencement speeches. The presence of Native Americans on campus generated great enthusiasm among Dickinson students, and they volunteered services, observed teaching methods and participated in events. The October 24, 1896 Dickinsonian "On the Campus" section tells of the new volunteer Sunday School teachers from the Dickinson chapter of the YMCA. It further declares that those who work with Indian boys "enjoy a rare privilege." In addition, at the time of annual Indian School commencement, it was traditional for a half day holiday to be given so Dickinson students could attend the "very interesting exercises." Dickinson College also provided Carlisle Indian School students with access to the Dickinson Preparatory School ("Conway Hall") and college level education.

== Later years ==
In 1883, Lafayette College in Easton, Pennsylvania, awarded him a Doctor of Laws (LL.D.) In 1888, at the age of 66, McCauley resigned as President of Dickinson College and returned to the pastorate. He later combined his preaching with a professorship of theology and Hebrew at Morgan College, now Morgan State University, in Baltimore, Maryland.

Reverend James Andrew McCauley died on December 12, 1896, in Baltimore, Maryland, at the age of 74.

== McCauley Memorial Room ==
On June 6, 1925, the McCauley Memorial Room in Old West at Dickinson College was dedicated in his memory, the gift of one of his students, Lemuel T. Appold, class of 1882. The room was intended to serve the students as a recreation and study room, but also became the site for several decades of meetings of the faculty with the president of the College.
