= The Dickinsonian =

Student newspaper of Dickinson College

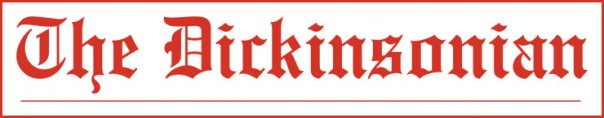
- Type: Student newspaper
- Format: Berliner
- Editor-in-chief: Walker Kmetz; Eleanor Nolan
- Founded: 1872
- Headquarters: Dickinson College HUB; 28 N. College St; Carlisle, Pennsylvania
- Circulation: 2,000
- Website: www.dickinson.edu/dickinsonian

The Dickinsonian is a student-run newspaper published by students of Dickinson College in Carlisle, Pennsylvania. The newspaper is distributed free of charge on campus and to subscribers for a cost. The Dickinsonian is funded by the College and revenues from advertising and subscriptions.

== History ==
Originally published by Dickinson's two literary societies, Union Philosophical Society and Belles Lettres Society in 1872, the paper was issued monthly. At this time, the newspaper functioned as more of a literary magazine "for the purpose of advancing the interests of the institution; and uniting more closely the Alumni to their Alma Mater; and promoting Science, Art, Literature and Religion." Operated by faculty, students, and administrators, The Dickinsonian was responsible for bringing speakers like Walt Whitman to the campus.

However, towards the end of the 1800s, students desired that The Dickinsonian print more campus news than literary work. Students independent from Union Philosophical Society, Belles Lettres Society, and the College administration began publishing The Dickinsonian while the literary societies continued to publish their paper as The Dickinsonian Literary Monthly for some time afterwards. By 1925, the newspaper established itself as a reliable source of campus news. Beginning in 1932, the Dickinsonian has published an annual satirical issue titled The Drinkinsonian, which usually coincides with April Fool's Day.

== See also ==
- John Curley, a former editor-in-chief of The Dickinsonian
