= Muhammadou M. O. Kah =

Gambian diplomat (born 1966)

Ambassador Muhammadou M.O. Kah
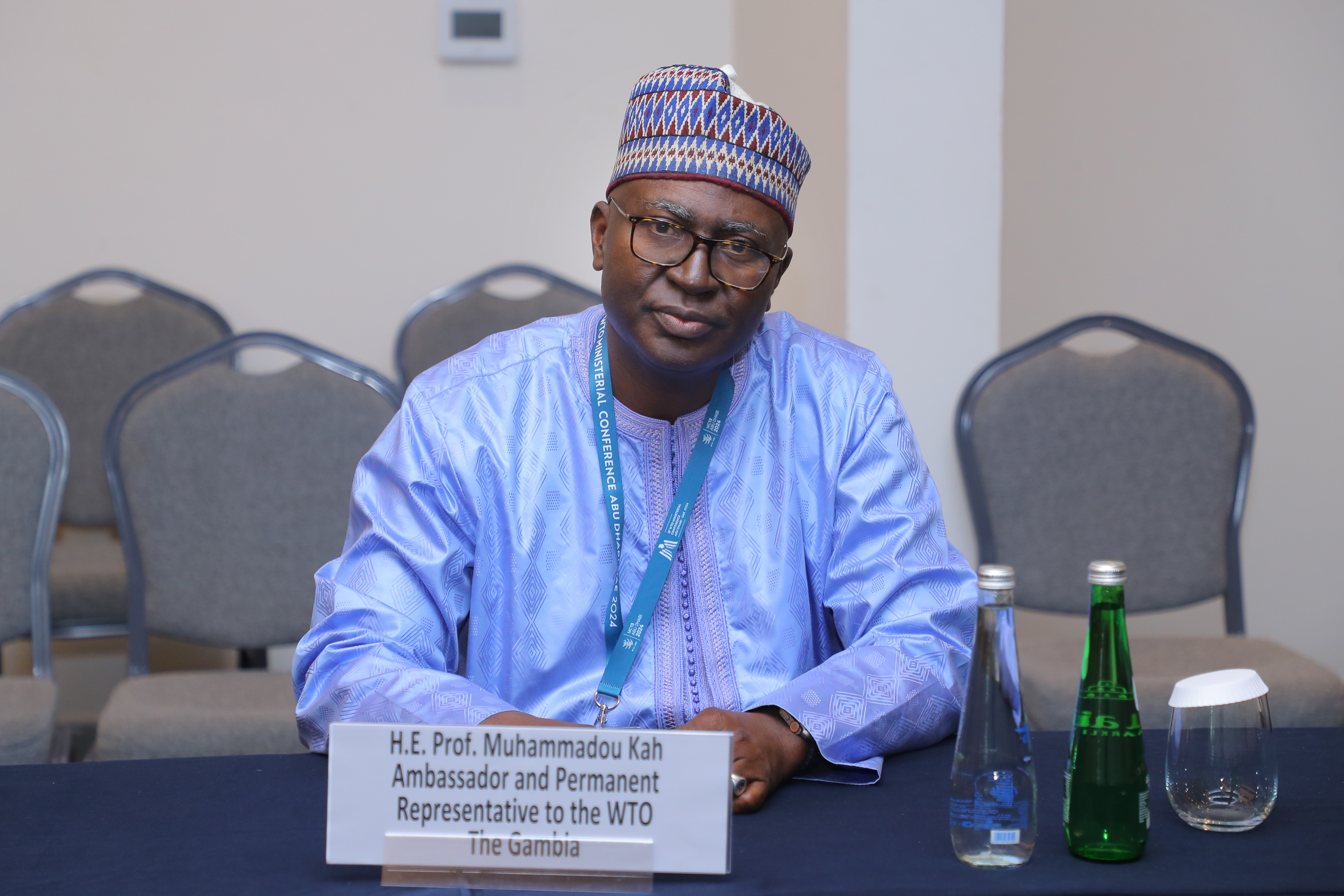

Permanent Representative of Gambia to UN
- Incumbent
- Assumed office May 2020
- Preceded by: Yusupha A. Kah

Vice President at American University of Nigeria
- In office 2017–2020

Vice Chancellor at University of the Gambia
- In office 2009–2015

Personal details
- Born: Muhammadou M.O. Kah; 6 May 1966 (age 60) Banjul, Gambia
- Education: Stevens Institute of Technology
- Occupation: Diplomat; Academic

Muhammadou M.O. Kah (born May 6, 1966) is a Gambian academic and diplomat. He has been serving as the Ambassador of the Gambia to Switzerland and permanent representative of the Gambia to the United Nations Organisations at Geneva (UNOG), WTO and other International Organizations in Switzerland since 2020. Prior to his appointment, he was vice president at American University of Nigeria responsible for academic affairs, based in Nigeria since September 2017. Between 2009 and 2015, Kah was Vice Chancellor of University of the Gambia, as the first Gambian born to provide leadership for the University. He also served as founding chairman at Zenith Bank Gambia Limited, a subsidiary of Zenith Bank in The Gambia between 2008 and 2020.

Kah holds all bachelor, master, and PhD degrees in information &technology management from Stevens Institute of Technology, U.S. As an academic, since 1995, he served in various positions for high education institutions in U.S, Europe, and Africa, including assistant professor at both Howard University (1996-2000) and Rutgers University (2000-2005) in the U.S., founding dean at American University of Nigeria in Africa (2005-2009), vice chancellor at University of the Gambia in Africa (2009-2015), vice rector at ADA University in Europe (2015-2017), and vice president at American University of Nigeria in Africa (2017-2020).

== Early life and education ==
Kah was born in Banjul, Gambia on 6 May 1966, where he grew up and completed his elementary and secondary education. Kah attended the Stevens Institute of Technology, U.S.; he graduated with bachelor's degree in information and technology management in 1989. In 1990, he further enrolled at the same institution to pursue a postgraduate degree, and he earned a Master of Science in information &technology management there in 1992. Kah continued his enrollment at Stevens Institute of Technology in same year to pursue a PhD in information &technology management, where he earned the degree in 1999. He also holds a Master of Science in Finance from George Washington University since 1999 and a postgraduate diploma in Strategy and Innovation from the University of Oxford's Said Business School.

== Career ==
=== Academic ===
Kah after earning master's degree in information & technology management from Stevens Institute of Technology, he began his career at Bloomfield College. Between 1995 and 1996, he was a director at the institution responsible for research and planning based in New Jersey, U.S. Subsequently, Kah joined Howard University in Washington, D.C where he served as assistant professor in IT department until 2000. Later on, he joined Rutgers University to serve in same position based in New Jersey, U.S until 2005.

In 2005, Kah moved from U.S to Nigeria, he held position of dean at American University of Nigeria based in Adamawa State, Nigeria until 2009. Addition to this, between 2008 and 2020, he served as founding chairman of board at Zenith Bank Gambia Limited, a subsidiary of Zenith Bank in Gambia. In 2009, Kah was appointed as vice chancellor at University of the Gambia, based in Banjul, Gambia as the first Gambian born to provide leadership for the University. The position he served for six years until 2015 when he moved to Eastern Europe in Azerbaijan to become vice rector at then startup institution, ADA University, responsible for technology and information. Kah served for two years, in September 2017, he returned to American University of Nigeria, Nigeria and he was appointed vice president responsible for academic affairs at the institution until August 2020.

=== Diplomacy ===
In August 2020, Kah was appointed by government of The Gambia as the Ambassador Extraordinary and plenipotentiary of The Gambia to Switzerland and permanent representative of the Gambia to the United Nations Organisations at Geneva (UNOG), WTO and other International Organizations in Switzerland. Since then he has served addition roles including. From June 2021 to July 2023, Kah was Vice Chairman for UNCTAD’s Commission on Science and Technology Development and a member of the Advisory Board of the UNCTAD Trade and Development Bureau (TDB). In 2022, he was elected the Vice President (Africa) for the UN Human Rights Council. He is a founding Board member of The International Digital Health and AI Research Collaborative (I-DAIR).

== Recognitions ==
Kah has received awards and honors including:

- 2014: The Gambia National Leadership Award.
- 2010 and 2014: The Gambia National Merit Award.
