= Dickinson College =

Private college in Carlisle, Pennsylvania, US

Coordinates: 40.20262°N 77.19522°W

- Motto: Latin: Pietate et doctrina tuta libertas
- Motto in English: Freedom is made safe through character and learning
- College newspaper: The Dickinsonian
- Type: Private liberal arts college
- Established: 1773; 253 years ago
- Academic affiliations: Oberlin Group; CLAC; NAICU; Annapolis Group
- Endowment: $720 million (2025)
- President: John E. Jones III
- Faculty: 272
- Undergraduates: 2,420
- Location: Carlisle, Pennsylvania, United States
- Campus: College Town, 170 acres (69 ha)
- Colors: Red and white
- Nickname: Red Devils
- Sporting affiliations: NCAA Division III – Centennial
- Website: dickinson.edu
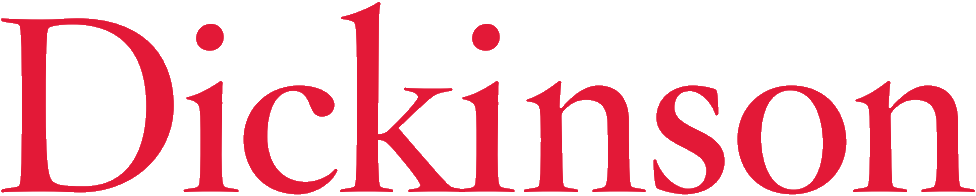

Pennsylvania Historical Marker
- Designated: July 1, 1947

Dickinson College is a private liberal arts college in Carlisle, Pennsylvania, United States. Founded in 1773 as Carlisle Grammar School, Dickinson was chartered on September 9, 1783, making it one of the first colleges established after the formation of the United States. Dickinson was founded by Benjamin Rush, a Founding Father and signer of the Declaration of Independence. The college is named in honor of John Dickinson, a Founding Father who served as president of Pennsylvania and was a delegate to the Constitutional Convention of 1787, along with his wife Mary Norris Dickinson, who donated much of their extensive personal libraries to the new college.

== History ==
=== 18th century ===
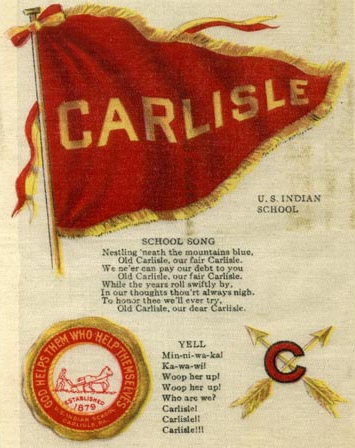
The collaborative relationship between Dickinson College and Carlisle Indian Industrial School lasted almost four decades

The Carlisle Grammar School was founded in 1773 as a frontier Latin school for young men in Western Pennsylvania. Within years Carlisle's elite, such as James Wilson and John Montgomery, were pushing for the development of the school as a college. In 1782, Benjamin Rush, a physician who was a prominent leader during and after the American Revolution, met in Philadelphia with Montgomery and William Bingham, a prominent businessman and politician. As their conversation about founding a frontier college in Carlisle took place on his porch, "Bingham's Porch" was long a rallying cry at Dickinson.

Dickinson College was chartered by the Pennsylvania legislature on September 9, 1783; it was the first college to be founded in the newly independent United States of America. Rush intended to name the college after the president of Pennsylvania John Dickinson and his wife Mary Norris Dickinson, proposing "John and Mary's College." The Dickinsons had given the new college an extensive library which they jointly owned, one of the largest libraries in the colonies. The name Dickinson College was chosen instead. Dickinson College's location west of the Susquehanna River made it the westernmost college in the United States at the time of its 1783 founding. Rush made his first journey to Carlisle to attend the first meeting of the trustees, held in April 1784. The trustees selected Charles Nisbet, a Scottish minister and scholar, to serve as the college's first president. He arrived and began to serve on July 4, 1785, serving until his unexpected death in 1804.

Among Dickinson's 18th century graduates were Robert Cooper Grier and Roger Brooke Taney, both of whom later became U.S. Supreme Court justices.

=== 19th century ===
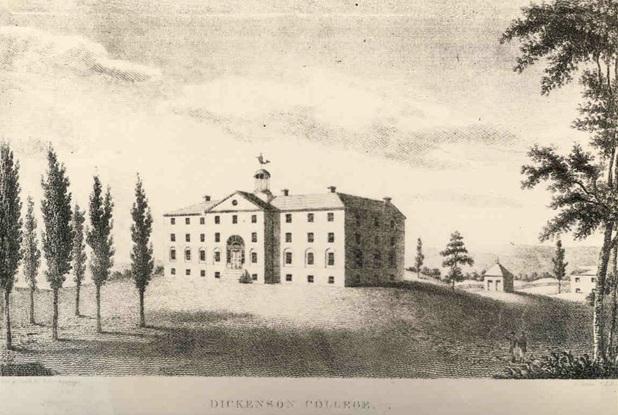
An 1810 illustration of the original Dickinson College building, now known as West College, designed by Benjamin Latrobe

A combination of financial troubles and faculty dissension led to a college closing from 1816 to 1821. In 1832, when the trustees were unable to resolve a faculty curriculum dispute, they ordered Dickinson's temporary closure a second time.

The law school was founded in 1834, the third school of law established in the United States. It became a separate school in 1890, although the law school and college continued to share a president until 1912. The law school is now affiliated with the Penn State University.

During the 19th century, two noted Dickinson College alumni had prominent roles in the lead-up to the Civil War. They were James Buchanan, the fifteenth president of the United States, and Roger Brooke Taney, the fifth chief justice of the United States. Dickinson is one of three liberal arts colleges to have graduated a president and a chief justice (Bowdoin and Amherst are the others). Taney led the Supreme Court in its ruling on the Dred Scott v. Sandford decision, which held that Congress could not prohibit slavery in federal territories, overturning the Missouri Compromise. Buchanan threw the full prestige of his administration behind congressional approval of the Lecompton Constitution in Kansas. During the Civil War, the campus and town of Carlisle were occupied twice by Confederate forces in 1863.

Carlisle was also the location of the Carlisle Barracks, which was converted in the late 1870s for use as the Carlisle Indian Industrial School. In 1879, Dickinson College and the nearby Carlisle Indian School began a collaboration, when James Andrew McCauley, president of the college, led the first worship service at the Indian School. The collaboration between the institutions lasted almost four decades, from the opening day to the closing of the Indian School in 1918. Dickinson College professors served as chaplains and special faculty to the Native American students. Dickinson College students volunteered services, observed teaching methods, and participated in events at the Indian School. Dickinson College accepted select Indian School students to attend its Preparatory School ("Conway Hall") and gain college-level education.

When George Metzger, class of 1798, died in 1879, he left his land and $25,000 (equivalent to $864,000 in 2025) to the town of Carlisle to found a college for women. In 1881, the Metzger Institute opened. The college operated independently until 1913, when its building was leased to Dickinson College for the education of women. The building served as a women's dorm until 1963.

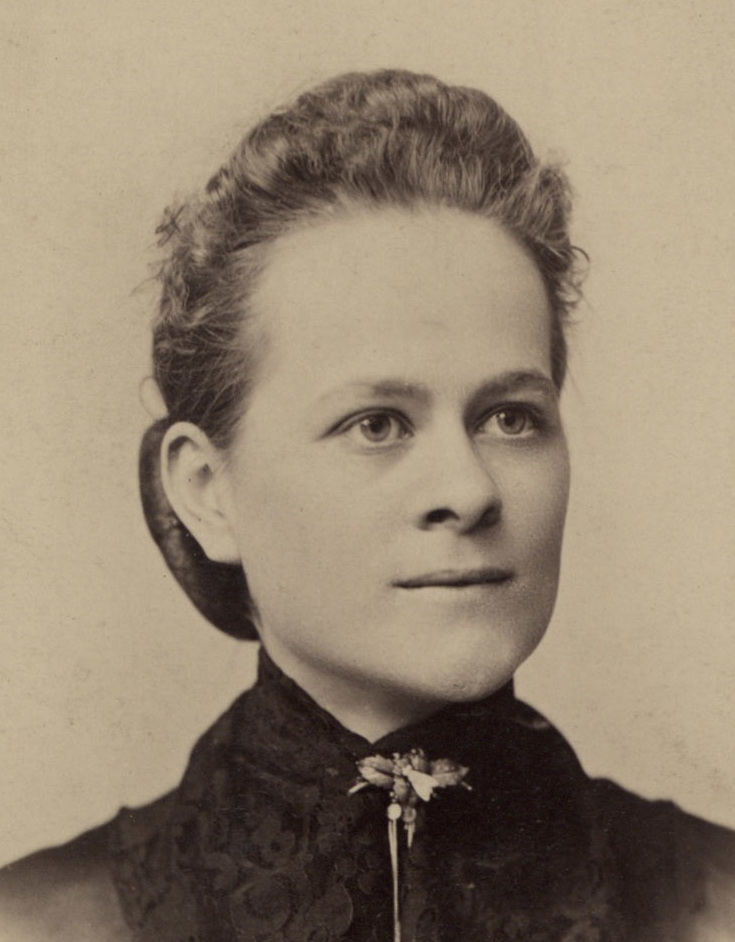
Zatae Leola Longsdorff Straw, an 1887 graduate of the college

In 1887, Zatae Longsdorff became the first woman to graduate from Dickinson.

=== 20th century ===
In 1901, John Robert Paul Brock became the first black man to graduate from Dickinson; in 1919, Esther Popel Shaw was the first black woman to graduate.

Dickinson also admitted Native American students: Thomas P. Marshall, a Sioux from Pine Ridge agency, South Dakota, was one of the first; his grave is in the Carlisle Indian Industrial School (CIIS) cemetery. In 1910, Frank Mount Pleasant was the first Native American to graduate from Dickinson.

The college introduced the Joseph Priestley Award in 1952, which gives recognition to scientists who have made a contribution to "the welfare of humanity". The first person to receive this was Hugh Stott Taylor, for his work in chemistry, with a later recipient being Vint Cerf.

In the 1990s, the college experienced financial troubles. Acceptance rates climbed upwards. Henry Clarke, an alumnus who was in the ice cream business, founded the Clarke Forum for Contemporary Issues at Dickinson College, and in 1994 established the Clarke Center. William Durden, who became the 27th President in 1999, was credited with improving financial climate and revamping academics.

=== 21st century ===
Dickinson's acceptance rate is 35%, and the institutional endowment has more than doubled since 2000.

In 2000 Dickinson opened a new science building, Tome Hall, a state-of-the-art interdisciplinary facility to host astronomy, computer science, math, and physics. Tome houses Dickinson's innovative "Workshop Physics" program and was the first stage of a new science complex. Opened in 2008, the LEED Gold certified Rector Science Complex serves as a place of scientific exploration and learning in an environment that is artful and sustainable.

Dickinson acquired Allison United Methodist Church for college expansion in 2013. The building, located at 99 Mooreland Avenue, provides the college with more than 33,000 square feet (3,100 m^{2}) for events, guest speakers, student presentations, meetings, ecumenical worship, and additional offices.

Dickinson aims for campus environmental sustainability through several initiatives. In the Sustainable Endowments Institute's 2010 green report card Dickinson was one of only 15 schools in the United States to receive an A−, the highest grade possible. In the same year, Dickinson was named a Sierra magazine "Cool School" in its Comprehensive Guide to the Most Eco-Enlightened U.S. Colleges: Live (Green) and Learn. The college's commitment to making study of the environment and sustainability a defining characteristic of a Dickinson education was also recognised through being top of The Princeton Review's 2010 Green Honor Roll.

In 2008, the college bought 100% of its energy from wind power, had solar panels on campus, owned and operated an organic garden and farm, and had signed the American Colleges & Universities Presidents Climate Commitment. The college's emphasis on sustainability education recognizes its importance for innovation and the lives of tomorrow's graduates. The college had made a commitment to being carbon neutral by 2020. This involved a mixture of increased energy efficiency on campus, switching energy sourcing, promoting behavior change and carbon offsetting.

== Campus ==
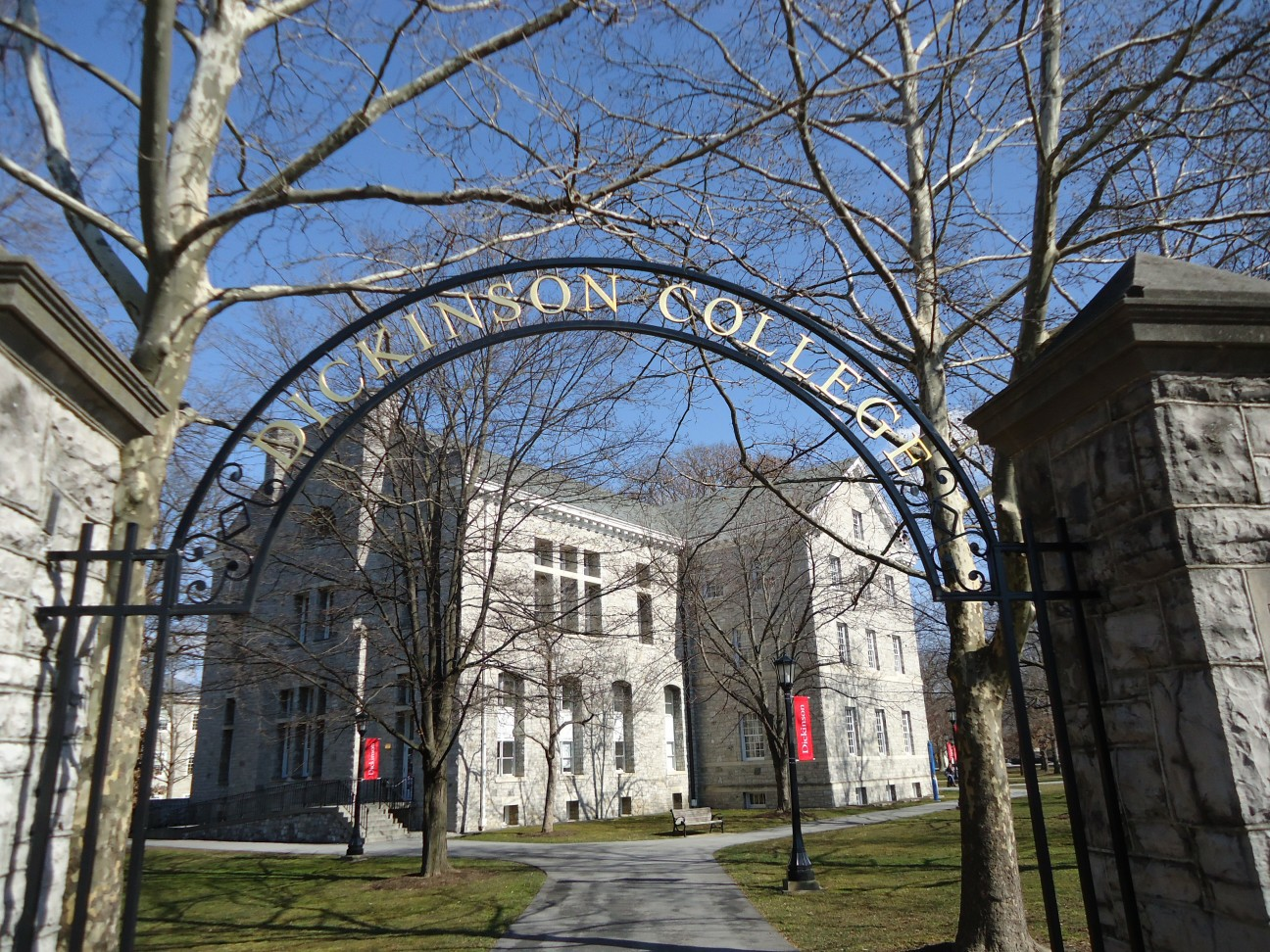
Entrance to the Academic Quad showing Bosler Hall

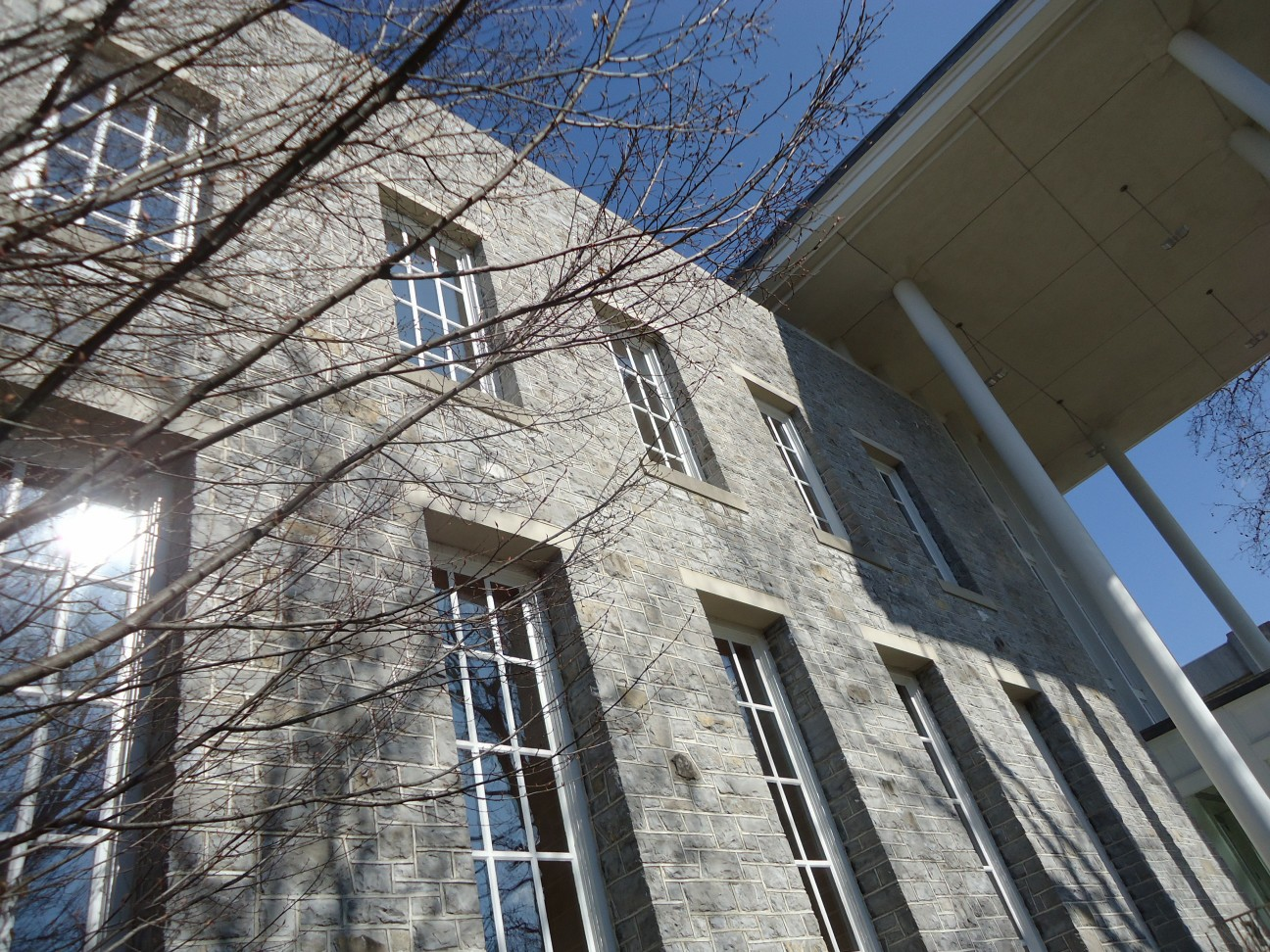
Waidner-Spahr Library

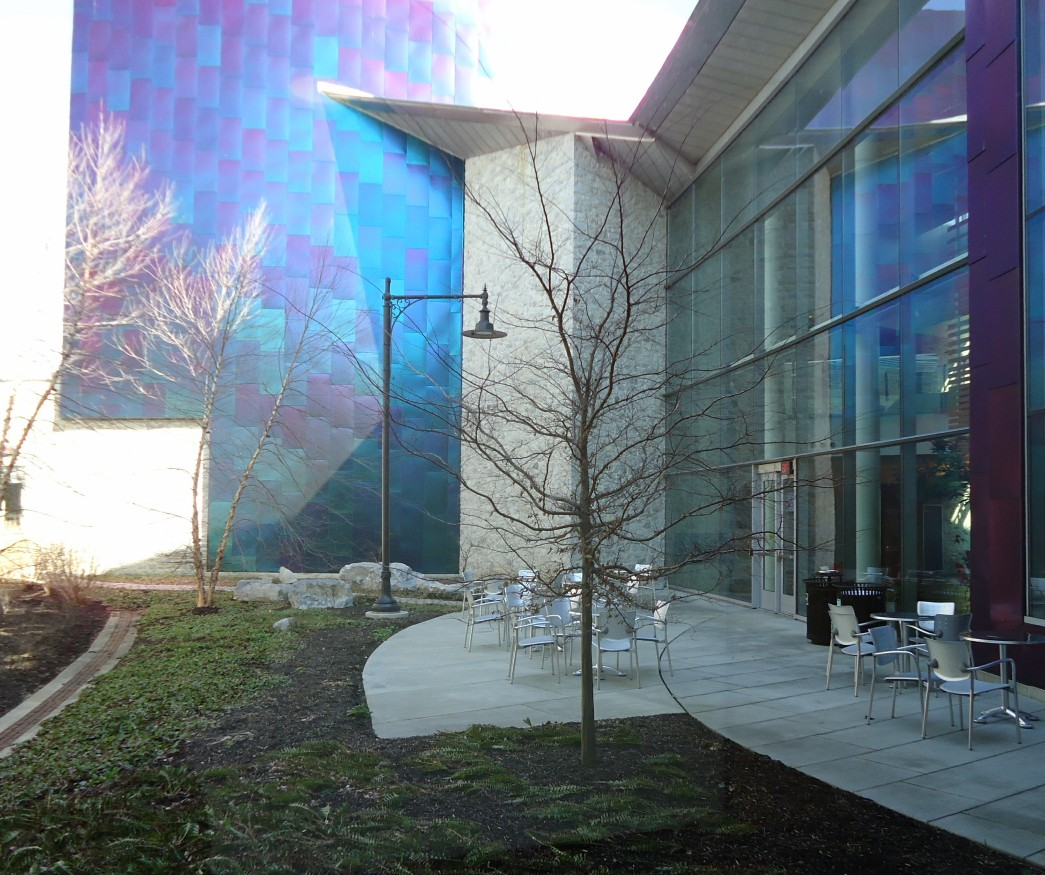
The college's science center

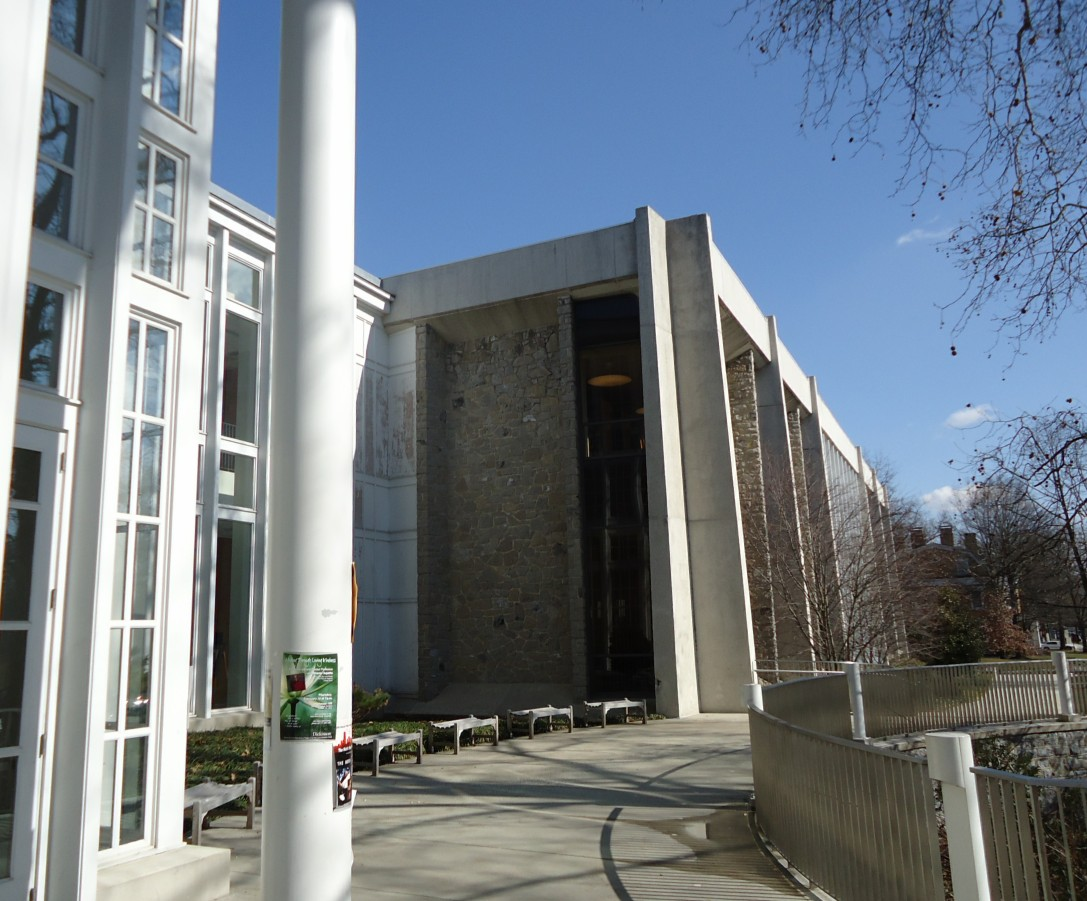
Waidner-Spahr Library

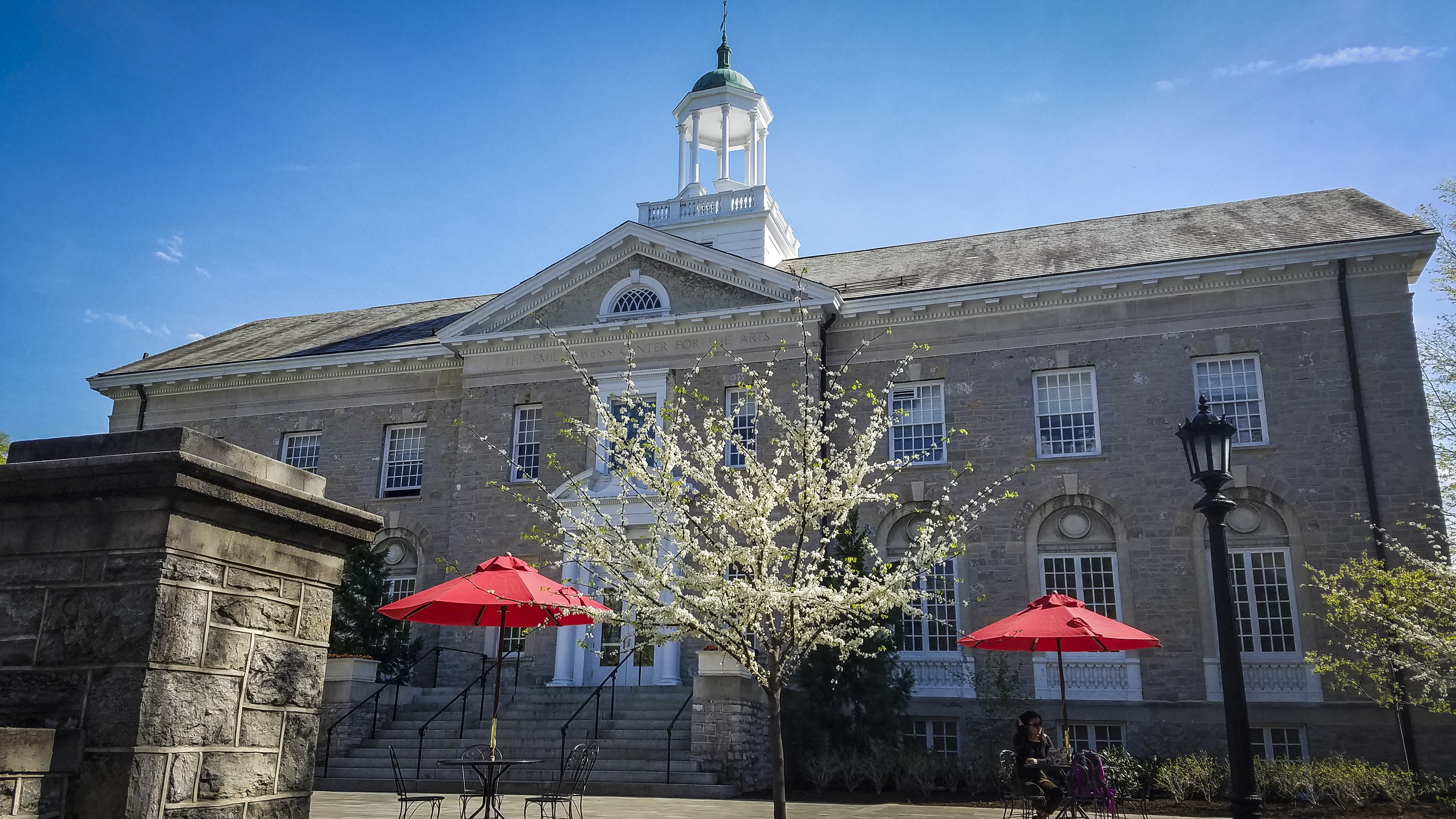
The Weiss Center for the Arts

Dickinson's campus is three blocks from the main square in the historic small town of Carlisle, the county seat of Cumberland County, Pennsylvania, and the U.S. Army War College. The campus is characterized by limestone-clad buildings and has numerous trees.

The frontier grammar school was founded in 1773 and housed in a small, two-room brick building on Liberty Avenue, near Bedford and Pomfret streets. When Dickinson College was founded in 1783, this building was expanded to accommodate all the functions. In 1799 the Penn family sold 7 acres (2.8 ha) on the western edge of Carlisle to the nascent college, which became its campus. On June 20 of that year, the cornerstone was laid by founding trustee John Montgomery for a building on the new land. The twelve-room building burned to the ground on February 3, 1803, five weeks after opening its doors. The college operations were temporarily returned to their previous accommodations.

Within weeks of the fire, a national fundraising campaign was launched, enticing donations from President Thomas Jefferson, Secretary of State James Madison, Chief Justice John Marshall, and others. Benjamin Latrobe, soon-to-be named as Architect of the Capitol, designed the building now known as "West College" or "Old West." It was finished in 1822, having burned down in 1803 (as noted on its sign). Old West is today the ceremonial heart of the college, as all students march through the open doors during convocation and march out the same doors at graduation. However, Old West no longer hosts classes, instead hosting administrative offices, study rooms, and student accessibility services.

Other buildings in the Dickinson College campus include East College, the humanities hall, located next to Old West. Originally constructed in 1836 as a dormitory, president's lodging, and classroom space, the building collapsed during renovations in 1969 and was subsequently rebuilt with the original limestone. Behind the East and West Colleges is the Stern Center, originally named Tome Hall, the college's first laboratory and science building. Stern was built in 1887. The same academic quad also hosts Bosler Hall, a library structure built in 1884 and remodeled several times. Across N. West street from the main academic quad is Denny Hall, a red-brick structure originally built in 1899 and also rebuilt after a fire in 1901. Denny Hall is famous for its large, stained-glass windowed lecture halls. Its largest room, which hosts the college's Philosophical Society, holds a letter from James Madison commending the society's foundation.

== Academics ==
In addition to offering either a Bachelor of Arts or Bachelor of Science degree in 22 disciplinary majors and 20 interdisciplinary majors, Dickinson offers an engineering option through its 3:2 program, which consists of three years at Dickinson and two years at an engineering school of Rensselaer Polytechnic Institute or Case Western Reserve University. Upon successful completion of both portions of the program, students receive a B.S. degree from Dickinson in their chosen field and a B.S. in engineering from the engineering school.

Dickinson School of Law, founded in 1834 as the college's law department, ended its affiliations with the college in 1917 and has been part of Penn State University since 2000. The college participates in a 3+3 program where fourth-year students can begin studies at the law school prior to their graduation from Dickinson College.

Dickinson College's most popular majors, by 2021 graduates, were:

International Business/Trade/Commerce (58)
Political Science & Government (35)
Psychology (32)
Biology/Biological Sciences (25)
Economics (25)
Neuroscience (23)
Biochemistry & Molecular Biology (21)

=== Reputation and rankings ===
Academic rankings

Liberal arts
- U.S. News & World Report: 45
- Washington Monthly: 39

National
- Forbes: 109

In 2006, Dickinson decided to stop publicizing its ranking in "America's Best Colleges" from U.S. News & World Report; however, in 2015 rankings Dickinson placed #40 among National Liberal Arts Colleges. In May 2007, Dickinson President William G. Durden joined with other college presidents in asking schools not to participate in the reputation portion of the magazine's survey.

In 2021, the Princeton Review ranked Dickinson College number two on their 2022 'Top 50 Green Colleges' List In 2010, Dickinson was one of only 15 schools to receive an A− in the Sustainable Endowments Institute's 2010 green report card. The college was named a Sierra magazine "Cool School" in its Comprehensive Guide to the Most Eco-Enlightened U.S. Colleges. The college's commitment to making a study of the environment and sustainability a defining characteristic of a Dickinson education landed it at the top of The Princeton Review's 2010 Green Honor Roll.

== Student life ==
There are over a hundred organizations representing different facets of the college.

=== Theatre and performing arts ===
The Mermaid Players, Dickinson's student-run theatrical society active since 1949, regularly performs student-directed plays, cabaret, and other genres. The college's Department of Theatre and Dance offers a major and minor in Theatre Arts.

The Mermaid Players' sister co-curricular group, the Dance Theatre Group, produces dance concerts, coordinates guest choreographer residencies, and organizes many other dance events open to all Dickinson students. Other dance groups on campus include Hypnotic hip hop dance crew, Synergy dance team, the Dig Drop Devils tap dance group, Anwar Belly Dance group, and the Swing Dance club.

There are three main performance spaces on campus: Mather's Theatre, The Cubiculo with a black box theatre and a dance studio; and The Site dance studio.

=== Athletics ===
Dickinson Red Devils wordmark

The Dickinson Red Devils participate in intercollegiate sports at the NCAA Division III level as members of the Centennial Conference. The Red Devils sports uniforms of red, white, and black.

Dickinson has 23 varsity sports teams, including baseball and softball, men's and women's golf, men's and women's soccer, football, men's and women's tennis, men's and women's track, men's and women's basketball, men's and women's lacrosse, men's and women's swimming, men's and women's cross country, men's and women's squash, women's volleyball, and women's field hockey. The college also has a cheerleading squad and dozens of intramural and club sports including ice hockey, men's volleyball, lacrosse, soccer, and ultimate frisbee.

The school's cross-country teams are led by long-standing coach Don Nichter. The women's cross country team has made 15 consecutive appearances at the Division III National Championships. The men's team has seen similar success, with eight consecutive appearances at the nationals championships.

The current head coach of the Dickinson Red Devils football team is Brad Fordyce.

Dickinson's men's basketball team won Centennial Conference titles in 2013 and 2015, and an at-large bid to the NCAA tournament in 2014. Dickinson reached the "Elite Eight" in the 2014 NCAA Division III men's basketball tournament. Gerry Wixted '15 was named D-III National Player of the Year in 2015.

The college was the site of Washington Redskins preseason training camp from 1963 to 1994 and 2001 to 2002.

=== Music ===
Approximately 300 students study music at Dickinson every year. Music ensembles, open to all students by audition, include the Dickinson College Choir, the Dickinson College Collegium, the Dickinson College Jazz Ensemble, the Dickinson Orchestra, the Dickinson Improvisation and Collaboration Ensemble, and the Dickinson Chamber Ensembles.

Extracurricular music groups include Dickinson's four a cappella groups: the DTones, the Infernos, the Octals, and the Syrens.

Dickinson's radio station is WDCV-FM.

=== Language, culture, and global education ===
Dickinson College has various on-campus houses and clubs dedicated to language and culture. On-campus student houses include a Romance Language House, the Russian House, the Global Community House, and the Social Justice House. The Center for Sustainable Living, or Treehouse, is an on-campus student house dedicated to sustainability and environmentalism.

=== Religious life ===
Dickinson has a number of different religious organizations, including the Harlow Family Hillel and the Asbell Center for Jewish Life, the Dickinson Christian Fellowship (DCF), the Dickinson Catholic Campus Ministry (DCCM), and the Muslim Educational and Cultural Association (MECA).

=== Greek organizations ===
Dickinson College has three recognized fraternities and six recognized sororities. Phi Kappa Sigma (Epsilon chapter) was established in 1854 as the first fraternity at Dickinson until it was suspended in 2009 Beta Theta Pi, which founded its Alpha Sigma chapter at Dickinson in 1874, was suspended in 2000.

=== The Dickinsonian ===
The Dickinsonian, first published in 1872, is the student-run newspaper.

=== School songs ===
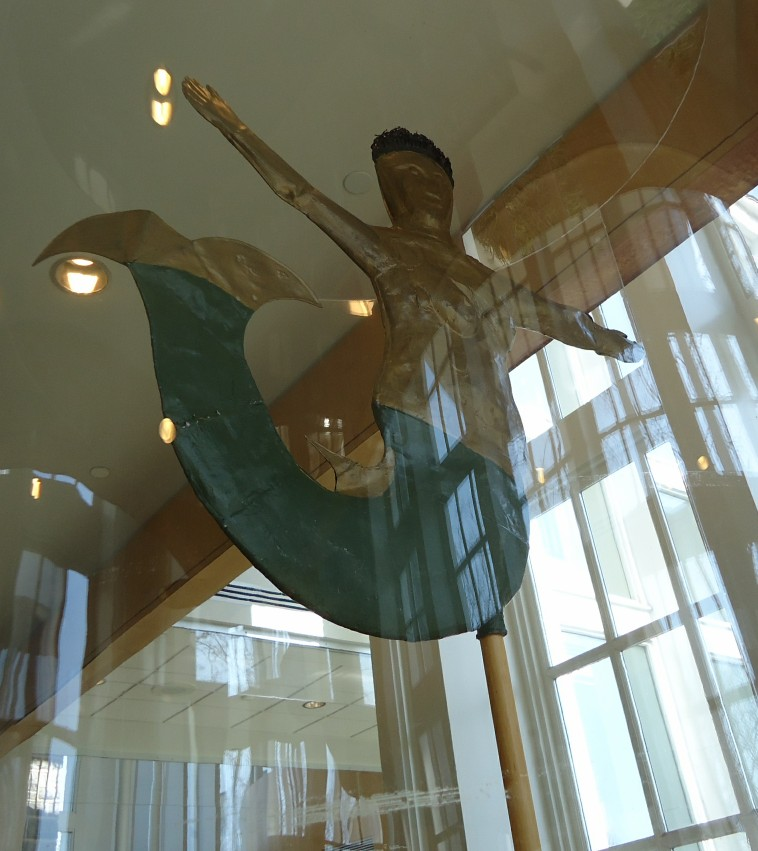
The Mermaid, a school icon

The college's musical tradition dates back to at least 1858 when the Medal of Honor recipient and author, alumnus Horatio Collins King, wrote the alma mater, "Noble Dickinsonia" to the tune of "O Tannenbaum" ("O Christmas Tree"). In 1937 the college published a book titled Songs of Dickinson, which contains over 70 works from Dickinson's past. In 1953 the men's glee club recorded an album of college songs. In 2005–2006, The Octals, Dickinson's all-male a cappella group, recorded a similar CD.

=== Hat Societies ===
Dickinson College has four Hat Societies on its campus. This name is given by the distinctive hats members wear on campus. To gain admittance into a hat society, one is "tapped" as a junior by current senior members to then serve as a member during his or her senior year. The induction ceremony is known as a tapping ceremony. While membership criteria differ amongst the organizations, overall character, and general campus leadership are major requirements for membership in any of the organizations.

== Alumni ==
Notable alumni of Dickinson College include Chief Justice of the United States Roger B. Taney (1795), remembered for writing the majority opinion in Dred Scott v. Sandford (1857); President of the United States James Buchanan (1809); Thomas Nelson Conrad (1857), the third president of Virginia Tech; John Goucher (1868), the founder of Goucher College; Baseball Hall of Fame pitcher Chief Bender (1902); former chief of the Strategic Air Command of the United States Air Force (SAC) Richard H. Ellis (1941); baseball executive Andy MacPhail (1976); Teddy Bennett (2013); Adam Grandiciel, frontman and principle songwriter of rock band The War on Drugs.

== Presidents ==
The following persons have served as president of Dickinson College:

No.	Image	Chancellor	Term start	Term end	Ref.
1a		Charles Nisbet	1785	1785	
acting		Robert Davidson	1785	1786	
1b		Charles Nisbet	1786	1804	
acting		Robert Davidson	1804	1809	
2		Jeremiah Atwater	1809	1815	
3		John McKnight	1815	1816	
College closed (1816–1821)
4		John Mitchell Mason	1821	1824	
acting		Alexander McClelland	1824	1824	
5		William Neill	1824	1829	
6		Samuel Blanchard How	1829	1832	
College closed (1832–1834)
7a		John Price Durbin	1834	1842	
acting		Robert Emory	1842	1843	
7b		John Price Durbin	1843	1845	
8		Robert Emory	1845	1847	
acting		William Henry Allen	1847	1848	
9		Jesse Truesdell Peck	1848	1852	
10		Charles Collins	1852	1860	
11		Herman Merrills Johnson	1860	1868	
acting		Samuel Dickinson Hillman	1868	1868	
12		Robert Laurenson Dashiell	1868	1872	
13		James Andrew McCauley	1872	1888	
acting		Charles Francis Himes	1888	1889	
14		George Edward Reed	1889	1911	
15		Eugene Allen Noble	1911	1914	
16		James Henry Morgan	1914	1928	
17		Mervin Grant Filler	1928	1931	
18		James Henry Morgan	1931	1932	
19		Karl Tinsley Waugh	1932	1933	
acting		James Henry Morgan	1933	1934	
20		Fred Pierce Corson	1934	1944	
21		Cornelius William Prettyman	1944	1946	
22		William Wilcox Edel	1946	1959	
23		Gilbert Malcolm	1959	1961	
24		Howard Lane Rubendall	1961	1975	
25		Samuel Alston Banks	1975	December 1986	
acting		George Allan	December 1986	1987	
26		A. Lee Fritschler	1987	June 30, 1999	
27		William Grady Durden	July 1, 1999	June 30, 2013	
28		Nancy A. Roseman	July 1, 2013	June 30, 2016	
interim		Neil B. Weissman	July 1, 2016	June 30, 2017	
29		Margee M. Ensign	July 1, 2017	June 30, 2021	
30		John E. Jones III	July 1, 2021	present	

Table notes:
