= American University of Nigeria =

Private university in Yola, Adamawa, Nigeria

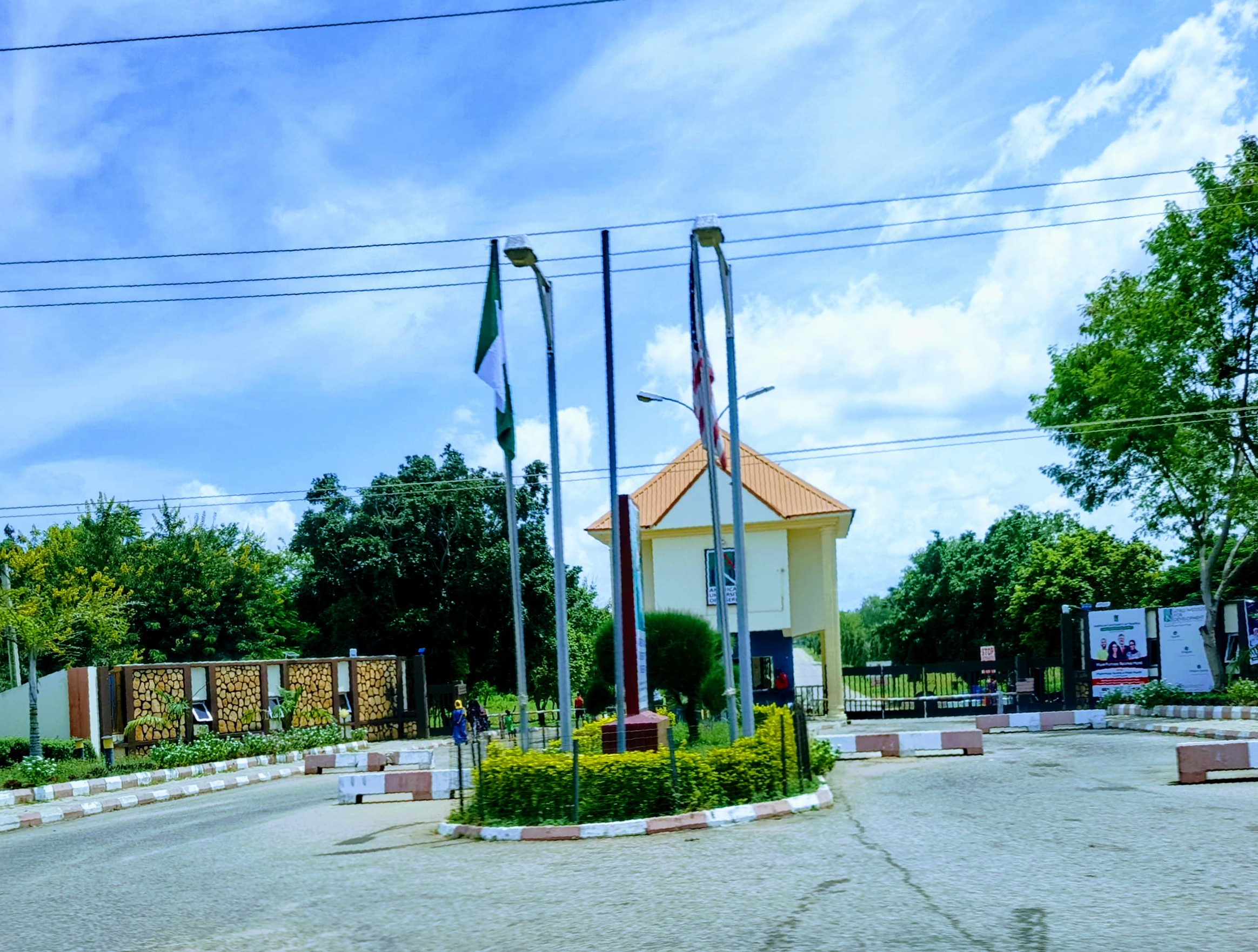
- Type: Private
- Established: 2004
- President: DeWayne P. Frazier
- Location: Yola, Adamawa, Nigeria; 9.191132°N 12.499648°E
- Campus: Rural
- Website: www.aun.edu.ng

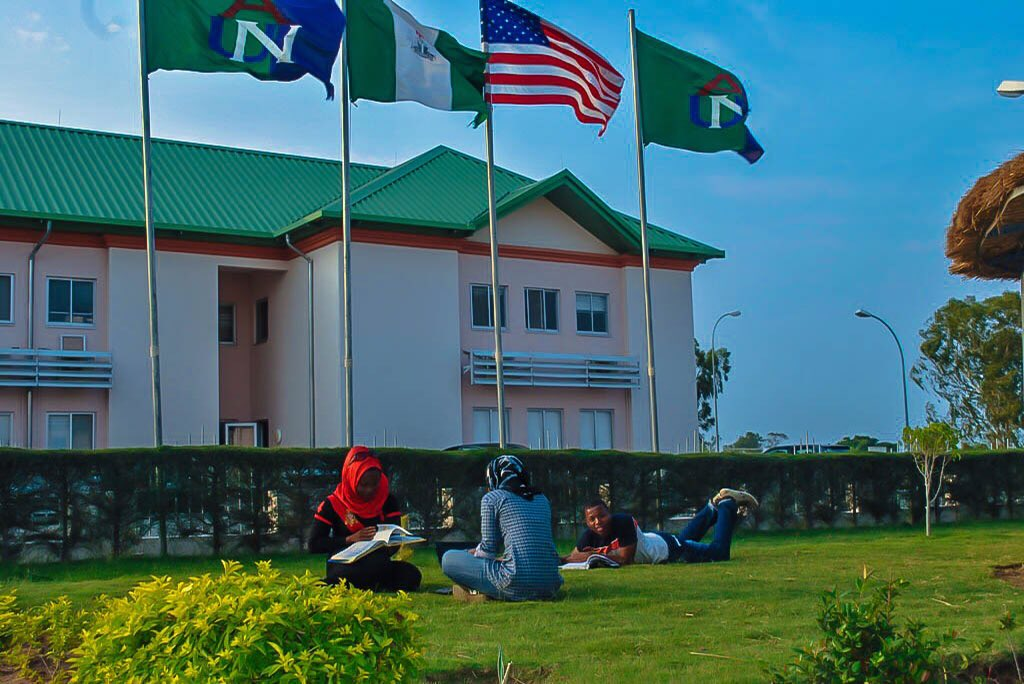
American University of Nigeria (AUN)

The American University of Nigeria (AUN) is a private university in Yola the capital of Adamawa, Nigeria. It offers an American-style liberal arts higher education at undergraduate, graduate, and professional levels.

AUN was founded in 2003 and is Africa’s first "Development University". Its current academic staff numbers 93, and its undergraduate and graduate enrollment is 1500 students. It is known as the first American-style university in Sub-Saharan Africa. AUN is accredited by the National Universities Commission (NUC).

== History ==
Founded in 2003 by a former Vice President of Nigeria and Peoples Democratic Party presidential candidate in the 2019 election, Atiku Abubakar, American University of Nigeria enrolled its first students in 2005. The university is located in Yola, the state capital of Adamawa.

The university was originally named the ABTI American University of Nigeria before it was renamed to AUN. AUN is the first American-style institution of higher learning in sub-Saharan Africa (the only other such university in Africa is the American University in Cairo in Egypt). AUN is a member of the Global Liberal Arts Alliance.

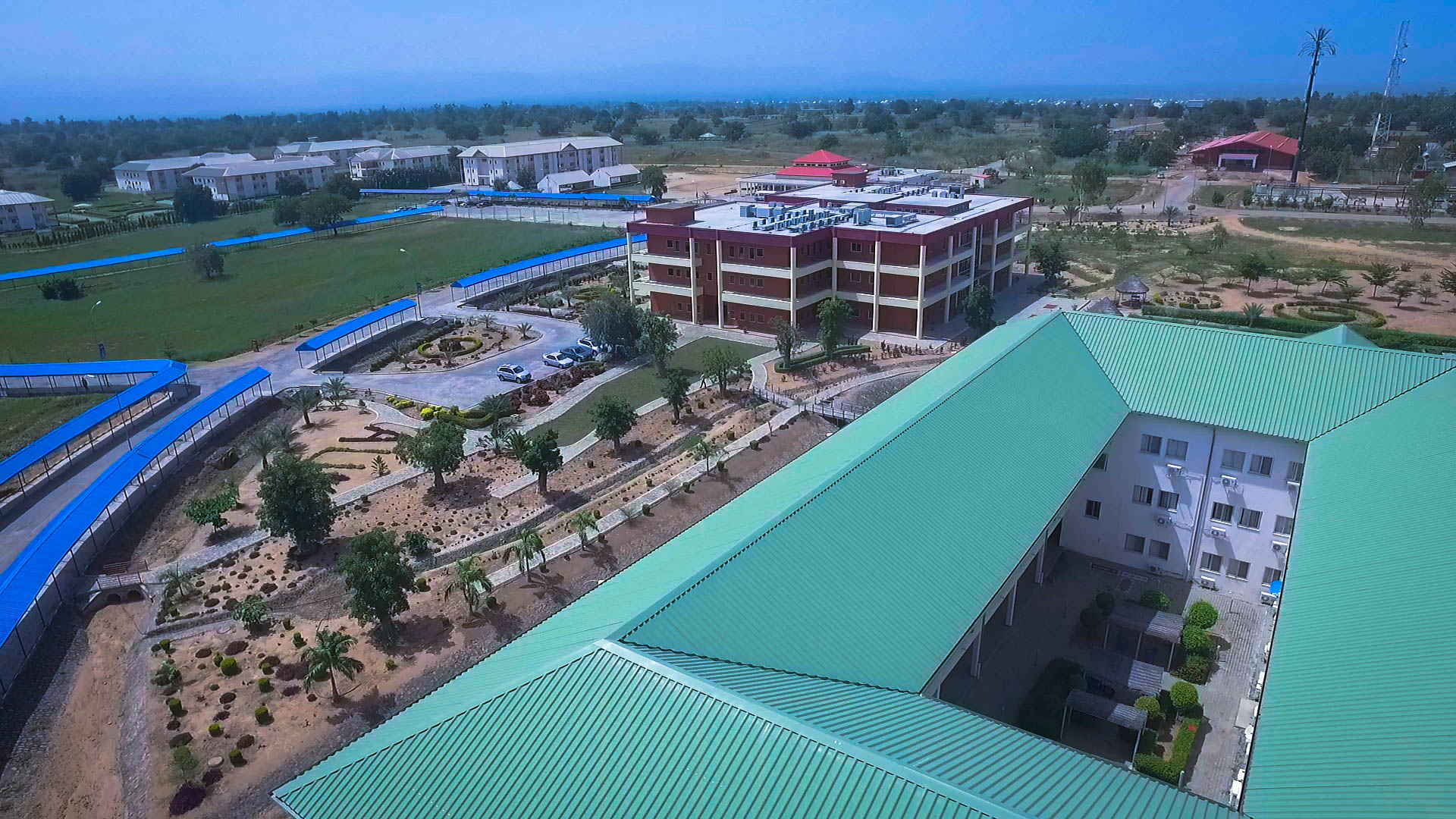
Aerial Image of AUN Campus

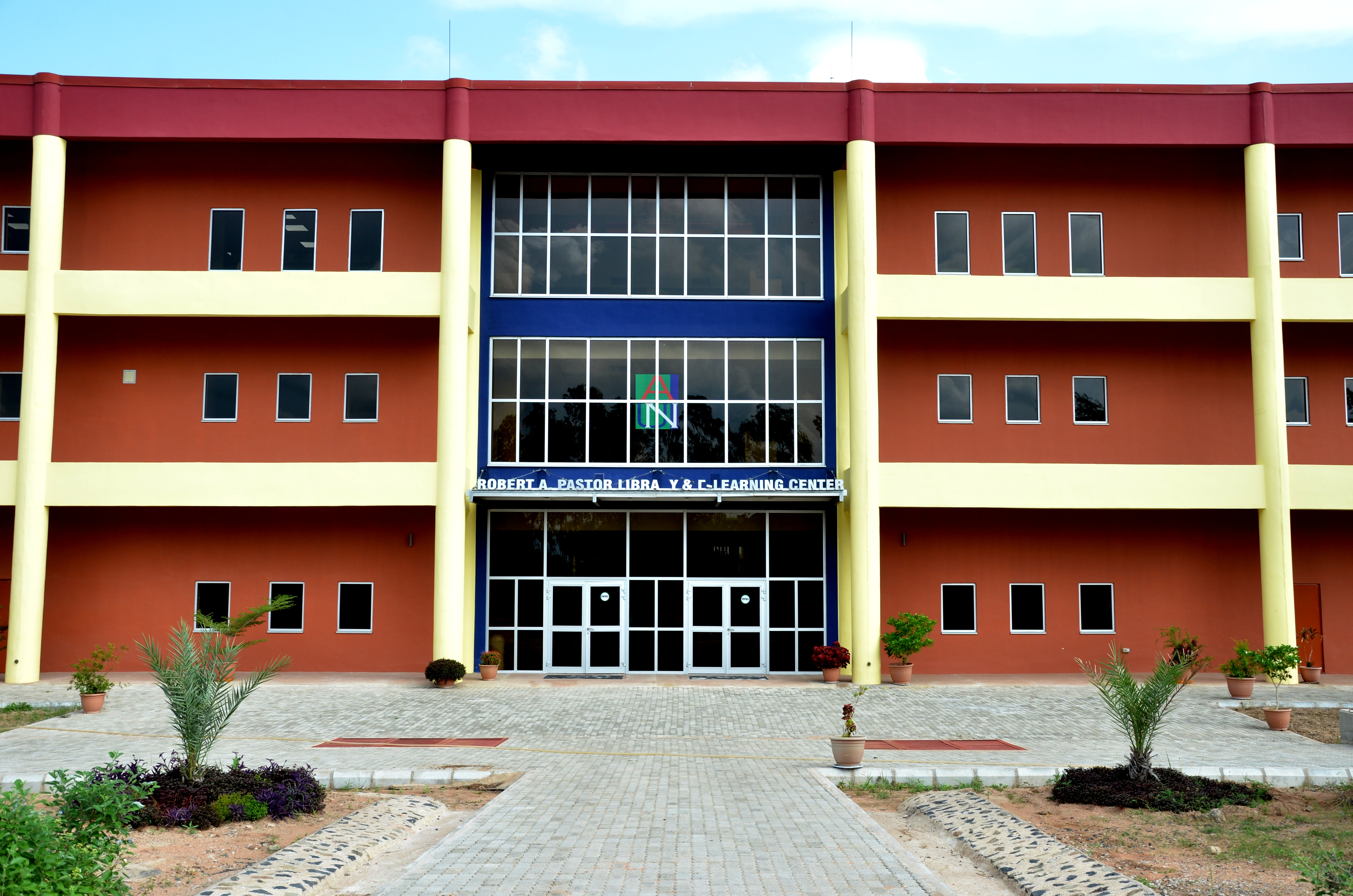
University Library

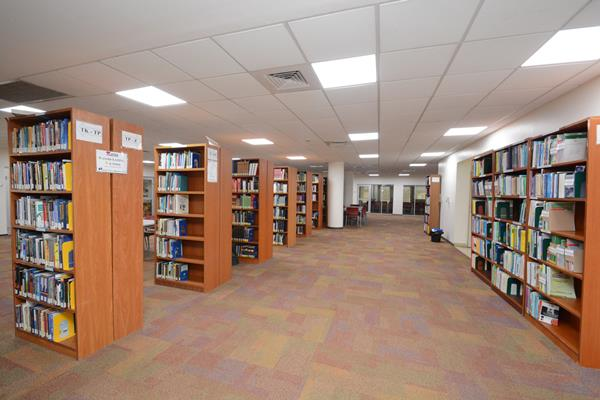
Inside the AUN Library

The university's current president is Professor. DeWayne P. Frazier, preceded by Dr. David Huwiler, Dr. Michael Smith, Dr. Margee Ensign (2010–2016), (2021–2022), Dr. Dawn Dekle.

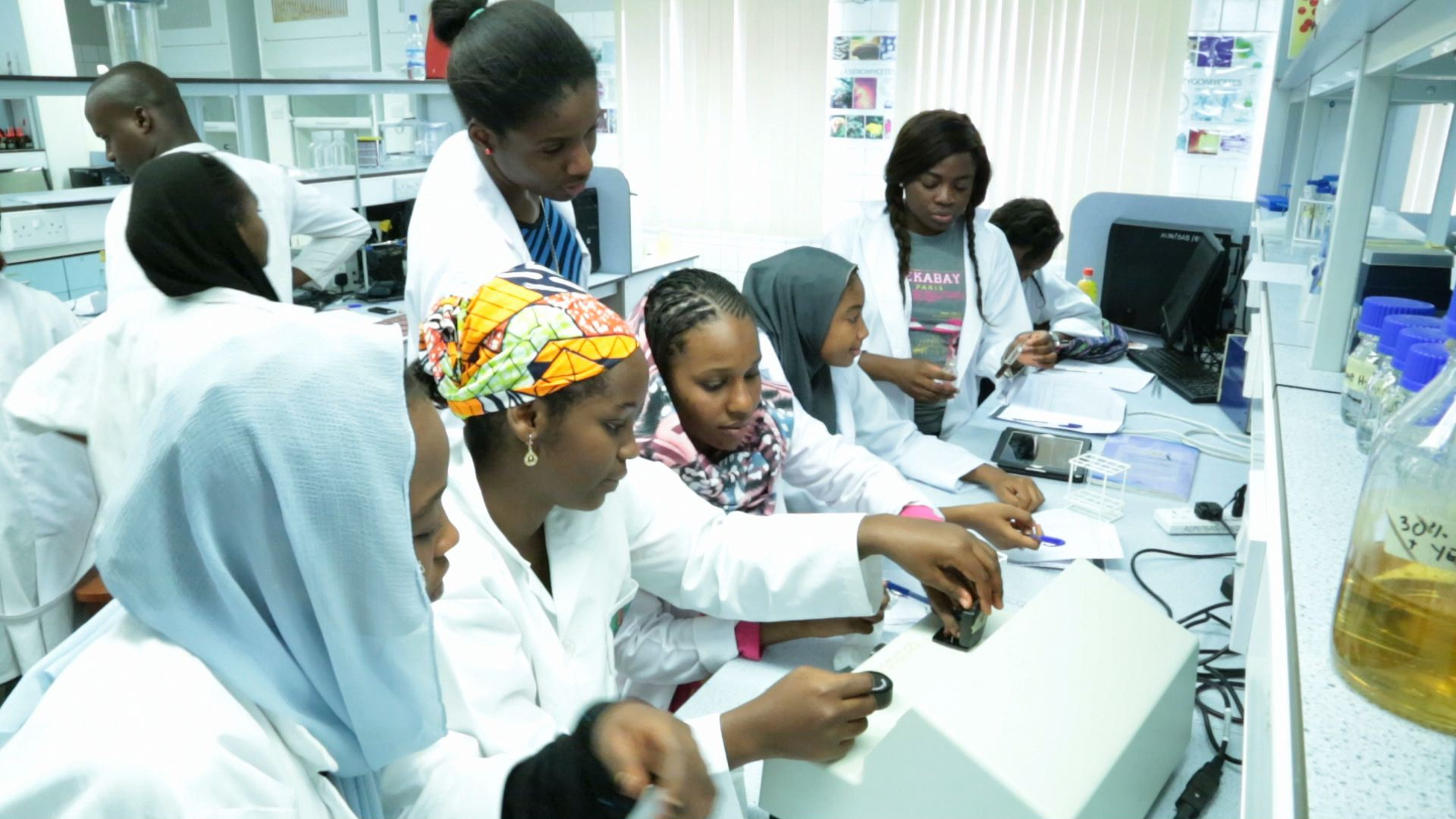
Students at the Laboratory

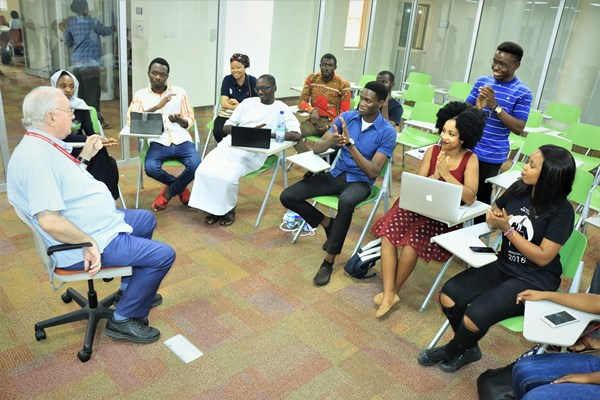
AUN Students in a Classroom

The institution was conceived as a university that would focus on development issues while providing an education modeled after the best US practices in content and pedagogy. The three original constituent schools were Arts & Sciences, Business & Entrepreneurship, and IT & Computing. In 2007, the name of the institution was changed to its present name of the American University of Nigeria (AUN). The pioneer class of 92 students graduated in 2009. Every class since then has graduated on schedule.

In 2008, the National Universities Commission (NUC) accredited AUN programs and re-accredited them in 2013. In 2012, AUN launched a graduate program, the Executive Master’s degree in Information Technology. Since then, more programs up to the Ph.D. level have been approved by the NUC.

In 2014, it opened the Robert A. Pastor Library and e-Learning Center.

== Location ==
AUN is located in Yola, the capital city of Adamawa State. The AUN campus occupies a serene savannah vegetation most of which was used as farmland.

== Campus ==
The main campus comprises 17 buildings including nine Residence Halls, a spacious cafeteria, a 3,500-capacity Commencement Hall which also serves as indoor basketball and volleyball court, a dedicated Students Hub, an environmentally-themed administrative building, School of Arts & Sciences building, and Peter Okocha building which houses the School of Law and its library.

A new, more spacious building for the School of Law with a 100-seater auditorium opened in 2022. The Robert A. Pastor Library and E-Learning Center, which won the American Library Associations’ 2013 Presidential Citation for Innovative International Library Projects, contains a library section with over 250,000 digital holdings, classrooms, study rooms, reading zones, the Writing Center, classrooms for the New Foundation program, Advising Unit and the Honor Society tutoring center. The North Campus, which used to be the temporary site, is located across the street from the main campus.

== Student Life ==
Freshmen begin community service from the first semester during Freshmen Orientation. Throughout their four years, students are encouraged to volunteer actively in any of the regular, extracurricular outings that the Office organizes almost every day of the week. Students work with people and organizations in the community, including schools, health clinics, community associations, and the local government.

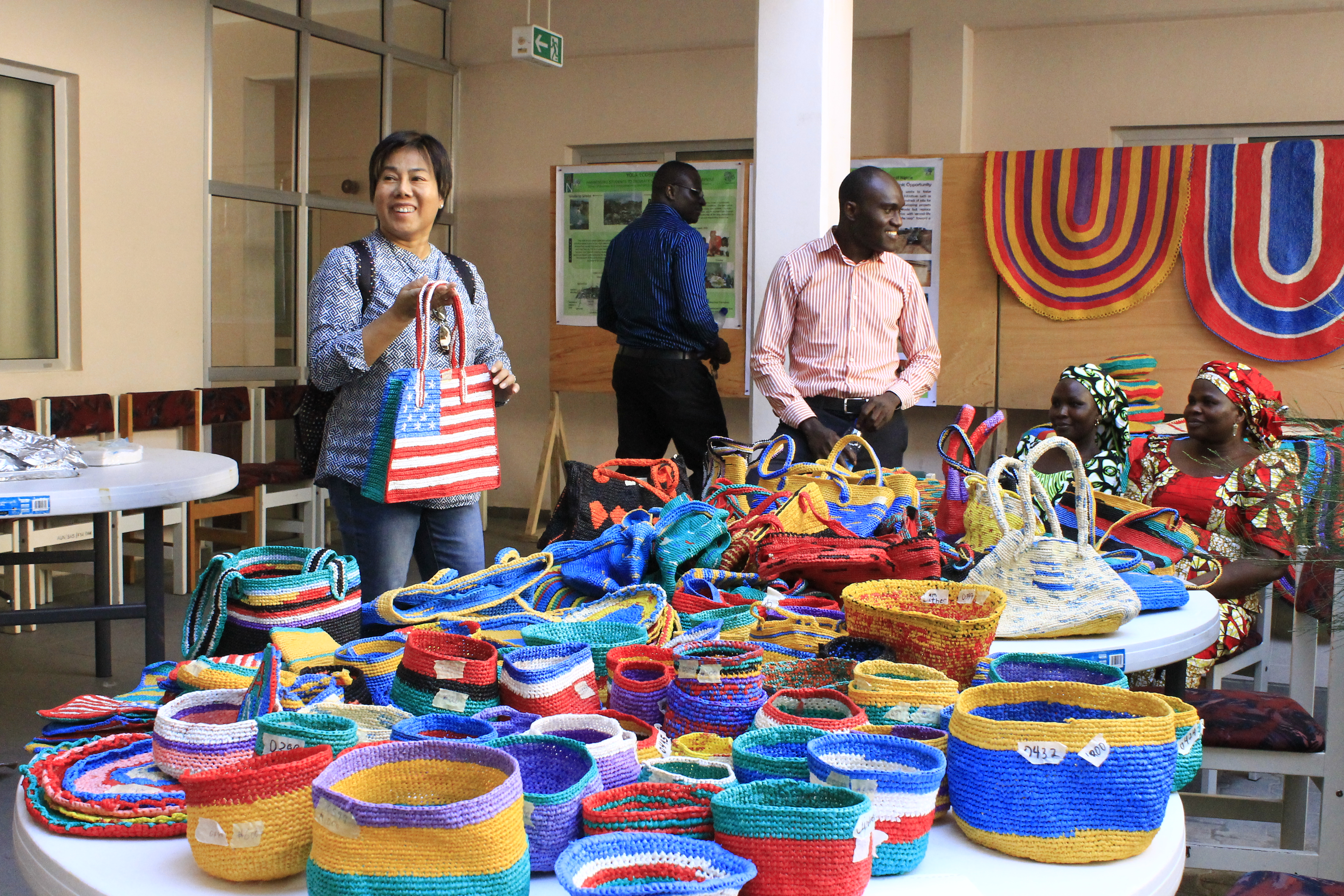
AUN EcoSential (Waste-to-Wealth Products)

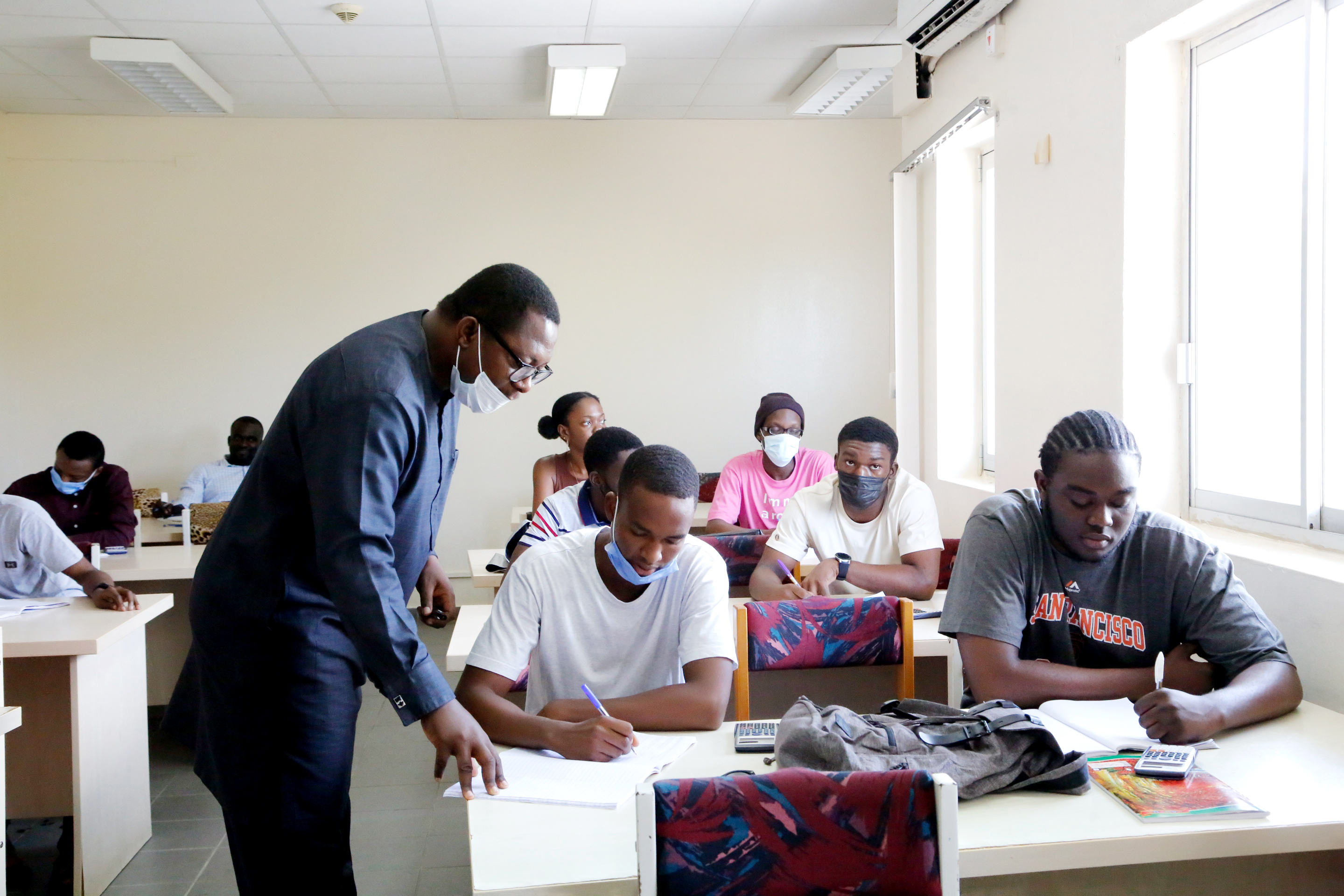
Students receiving lectures in a class room

== Academics ==
The university consists of six schools, offering the following undergraduate majors and graduate programs:

=== School of Arts and Sciences (SAS) ===
- BSc Communications & Multimedia Design
- BSc Natural & Environmental Sciences
- BSc Petroleum Chemistry
- BSC Economics
- BA Politics & International Studies
- BA English Language & Literature

=== School of Business & Entrepreneurship (SBE) ===
- BSc Business Administration (with specialties)
- BSc Accounting
- BSc Finance
- BSc Marketing
- BSc Entrepreneurship Management

=== School of Law (SOL) ===
- LL.B (Bachelor of Laws)

=== School of Engineering (SOE) ===
- BEng Chemical Engineering
- BEng Computer Engineering
- BEng Electrical/Electronics Engineering
- BEng Telecommunication Engineering

=== School of Information Technology & Computing (SITC) ===
- BSc Software Engineering
- BSc Data Science & Analytics
- BSc Computer Science
- BSc Information Systems
- BSc Telecommunications & Wireless Technologies

=== School of Basic Medical and Allied Health Sciences (SBMAHS) ===
- BSc Nursing Science
- BSc Public Health

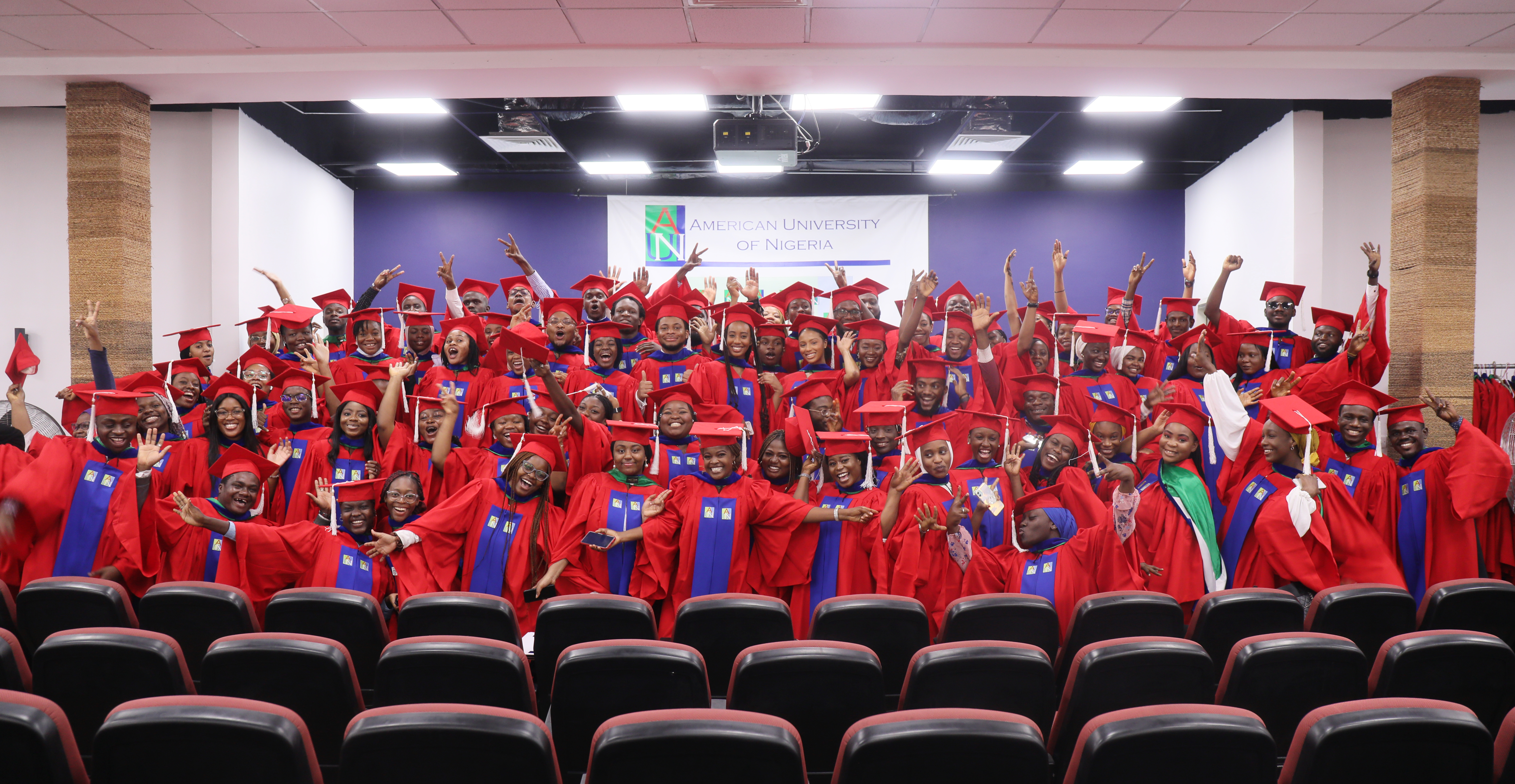
AUN Graduands in Gowns

=== School of Graduate Studies ===
- Post Graduate Diploma in Management (PGDM)
- Master of Business Administration (MBA)
- MSc Business Administration
- PhD Business Administration
- MSc Communication & Multimedia (CMD)
- PhD Communication & Multimedia (CMD)
- MSc Communication for Social & Behaviour Change (in collaboration with the United Nations Children's Fund - UNICEF)
- M.A English Language & Literature
- Masters of Information Technology
- Masters of Telecommunications
- Masters of Information Systems Security Management
- MSc Computer Science
- MSc Information Systems
- PhD Computer Science
- PhD Information Systems
- MSc Petroleum Chemistry
  - Oil & Gas Chemistry
  - Petrochemical & Polymer Science
- PhD Petroleum Chemistry

=== Hybrid/On-Campus Professional Masters Programs ===
- Master of Business Administration (MBA) - Hybrid
- Master of Information & Communication Science (MICS)
- Master of Telecommunication & Wireless Technologies (MTWT)

== Facilities ==
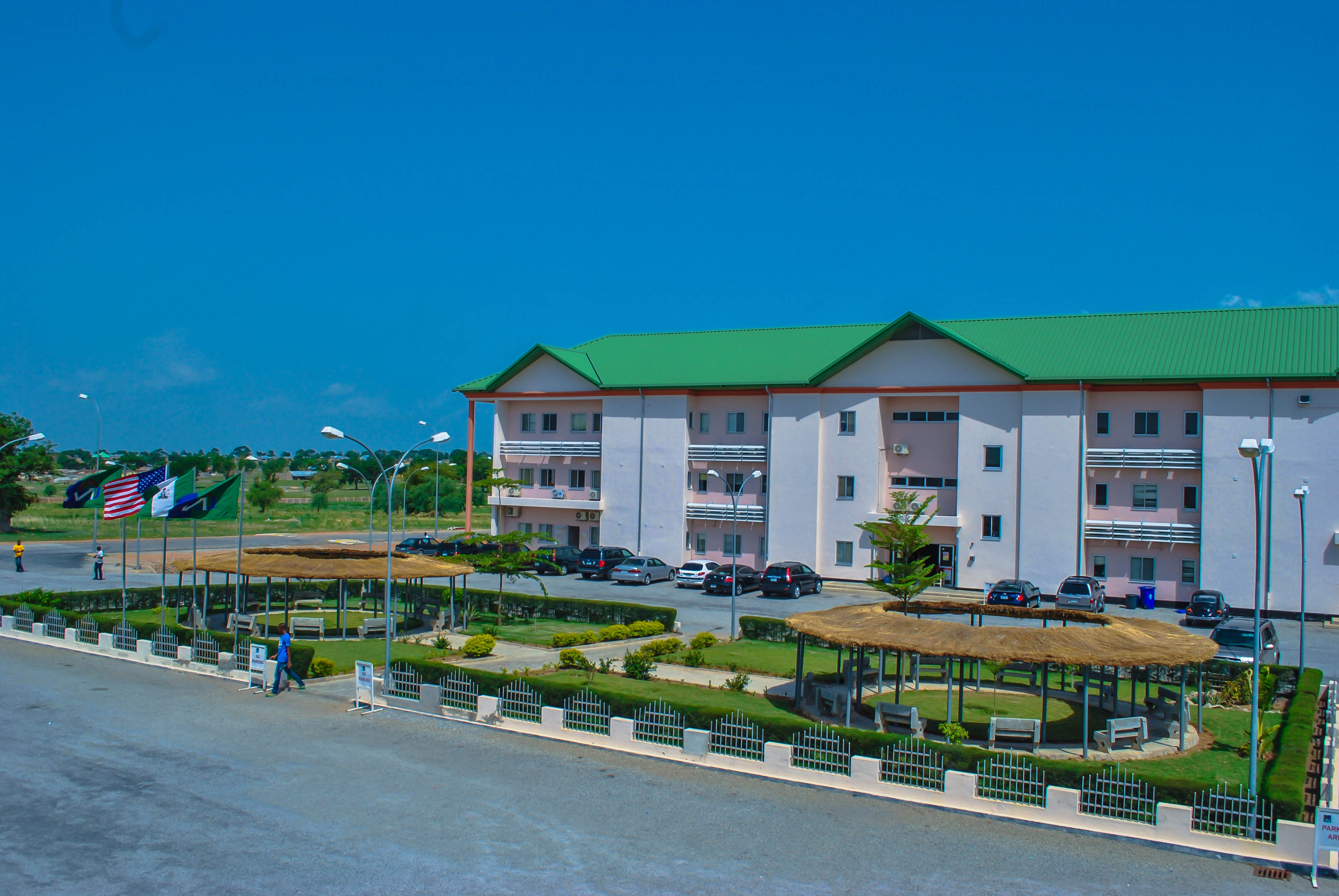
AUN Arts and Sciences Building

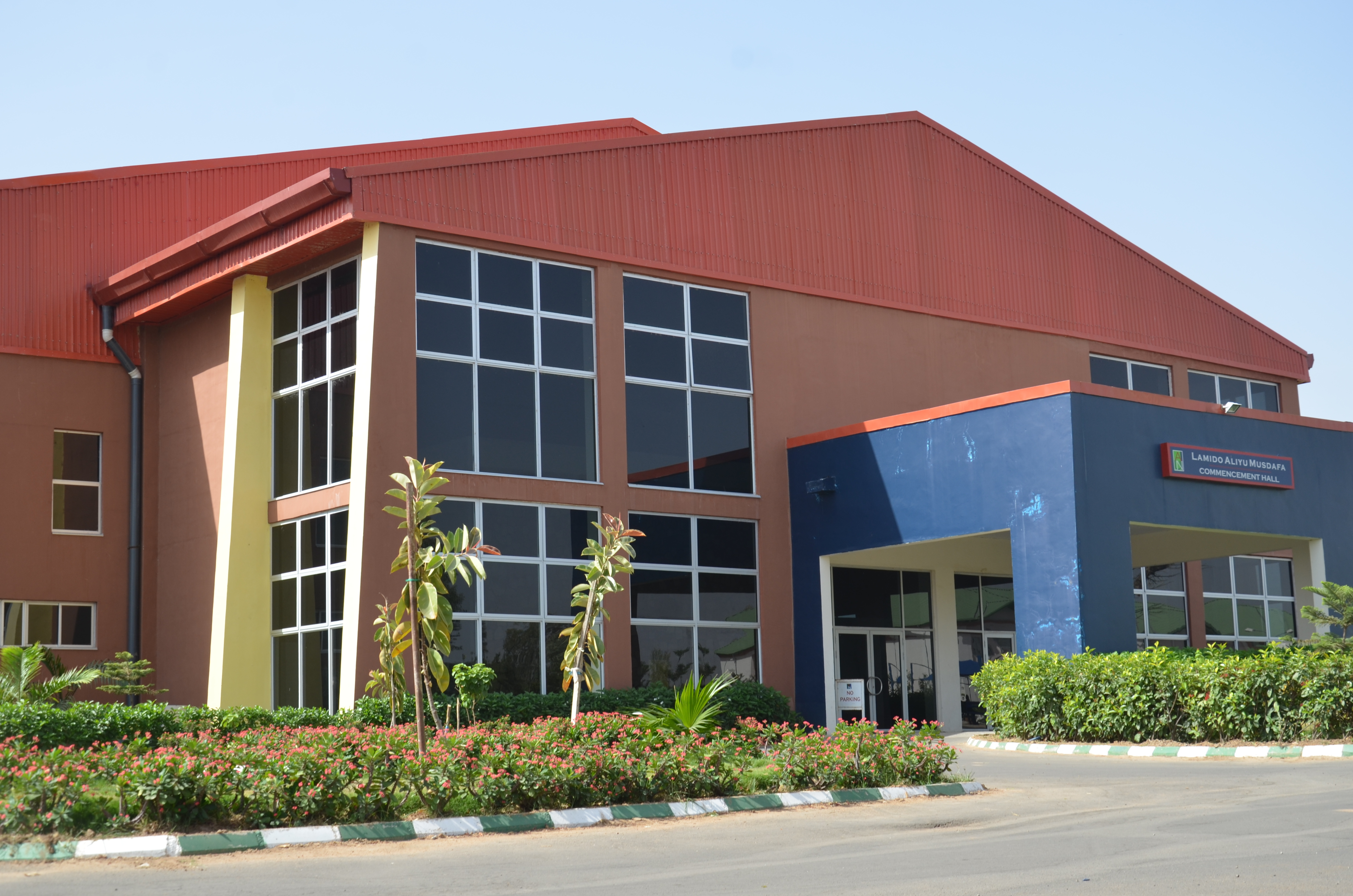
AUN Commencement Hall (Front View)

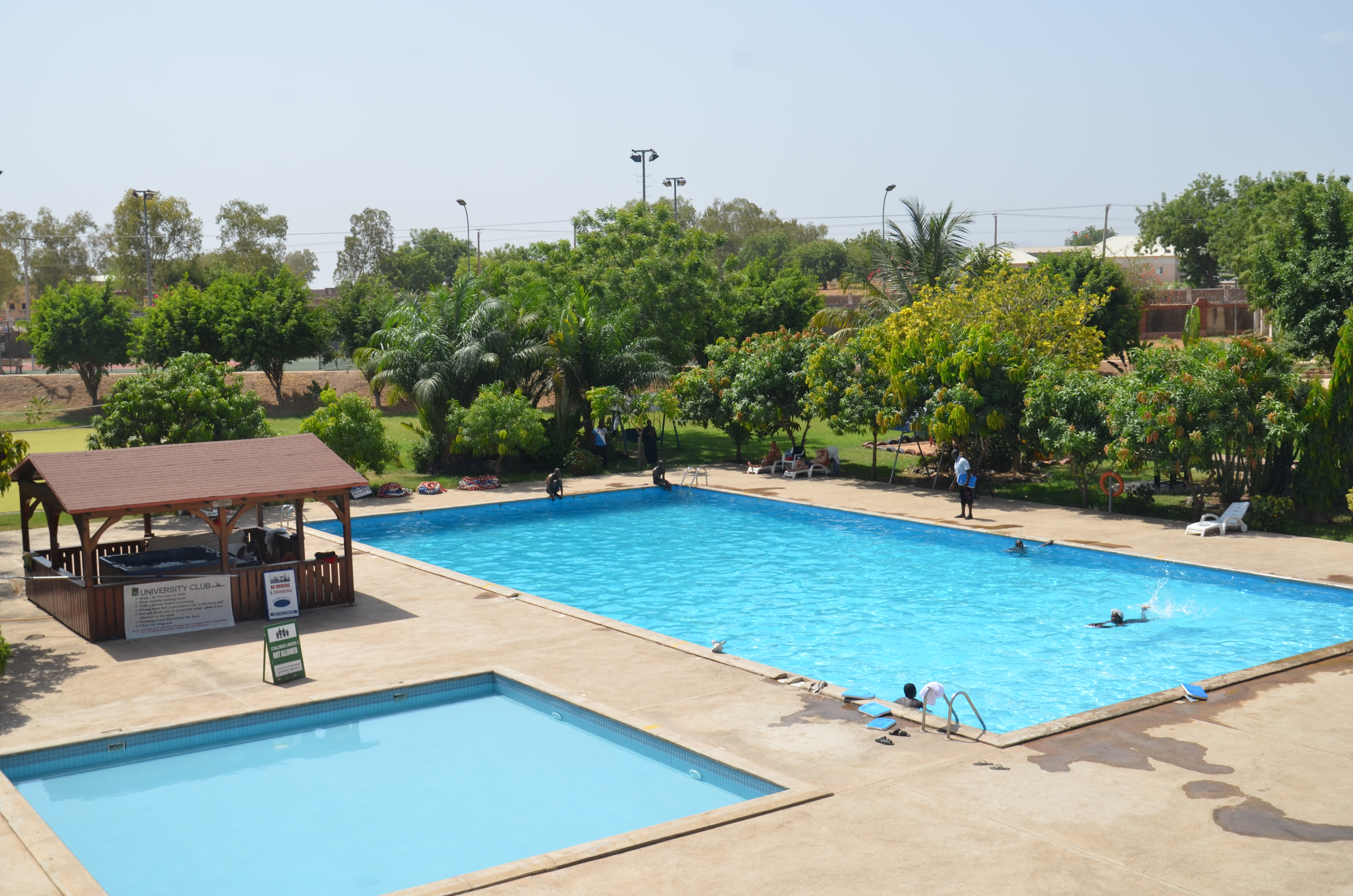
University Club Swimming Pool at AUN

AUN is a residential campus situated on 2,400 hectares. It is home to approximately 1,500 undergraduate students and more than 90 faculty members.

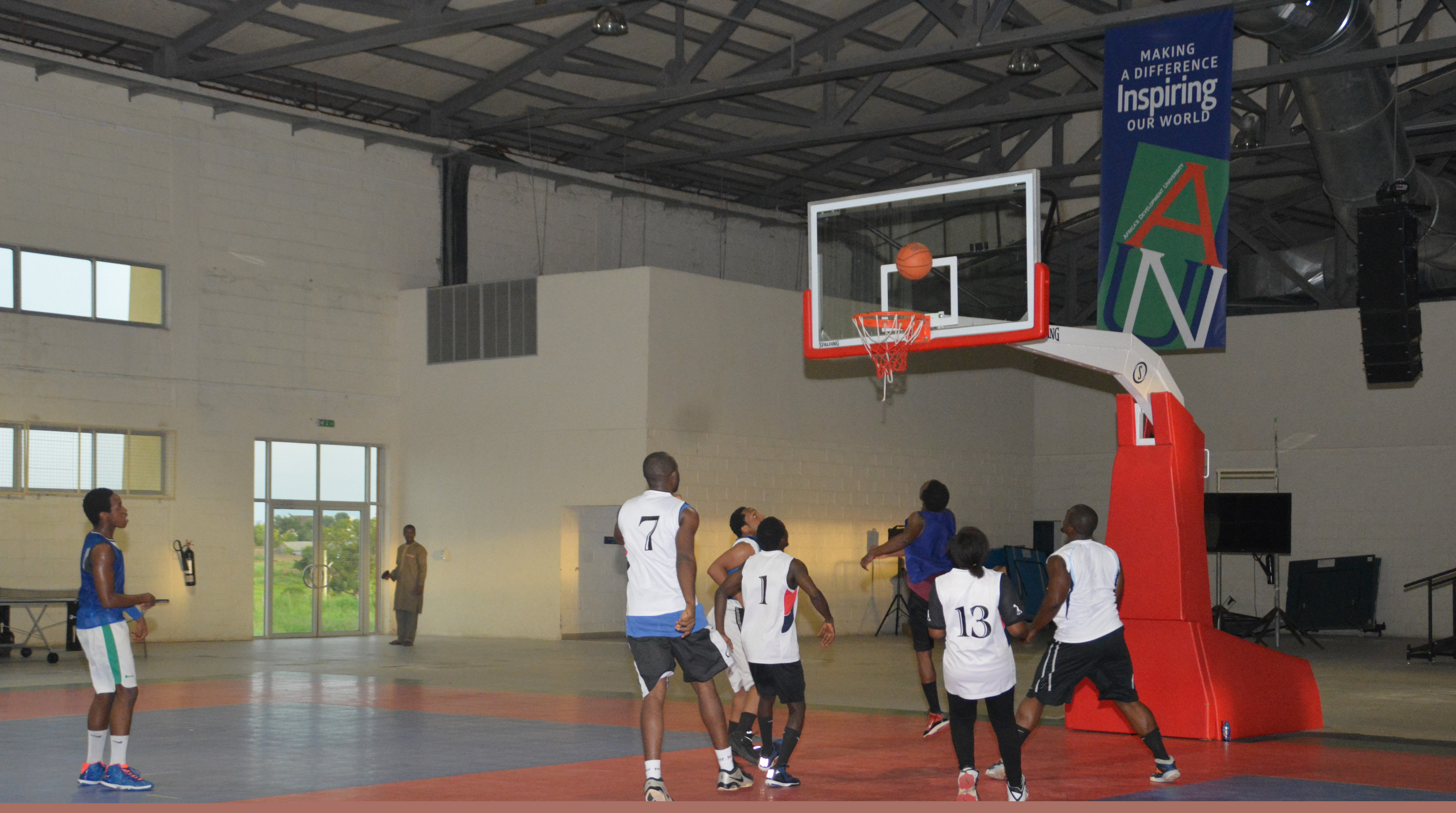
AUN Students playing Basketball

The university's e-Library Project received the American Library Association's Presidential Citation for Innovative International Library Projects in 2013.

== Notable alumni ==
- DJ Bally
- Emily Nkanga

== Governance ==
The AUN Board of Trustees consists of one American, Tulane Professor of Public Health, Dr. William Ellis Bertrand, and 12 eminent Nigerians, with Senator Ben Obi as Chairman of the Governing Council. AUN’s BoT members come from diverse backgrounds in academia, private and public sectors. The President/Vice-Chancellor of AUN is the Chief Executive Officer. The President’s Executive Council (PEC) is the top management organ and has as its members the Provost/VP for Academic Affairs, deans of the six Schools, the Vice Presidents for Administration/Registrar, Finance, and Student Affairs/Residence Life; and heads of Security, Enrolment Management, Technology Support, Physical Planning, Marketing & Communications, and University Events. The Senate is responsible for academic discipline and curriculum oversight while the Congregation, which comprises all staff with a minimum of a first degree, meets at least once every semester to receive a report of the University’s progress from the President.

=== List of presidents ===
- David Huwiler
- Michael Smith
- Dawn Dekle
- Margee Ensign
- DeWayne P.Frazier
