= Zatae Leola Longsdorff Straw =

American politician

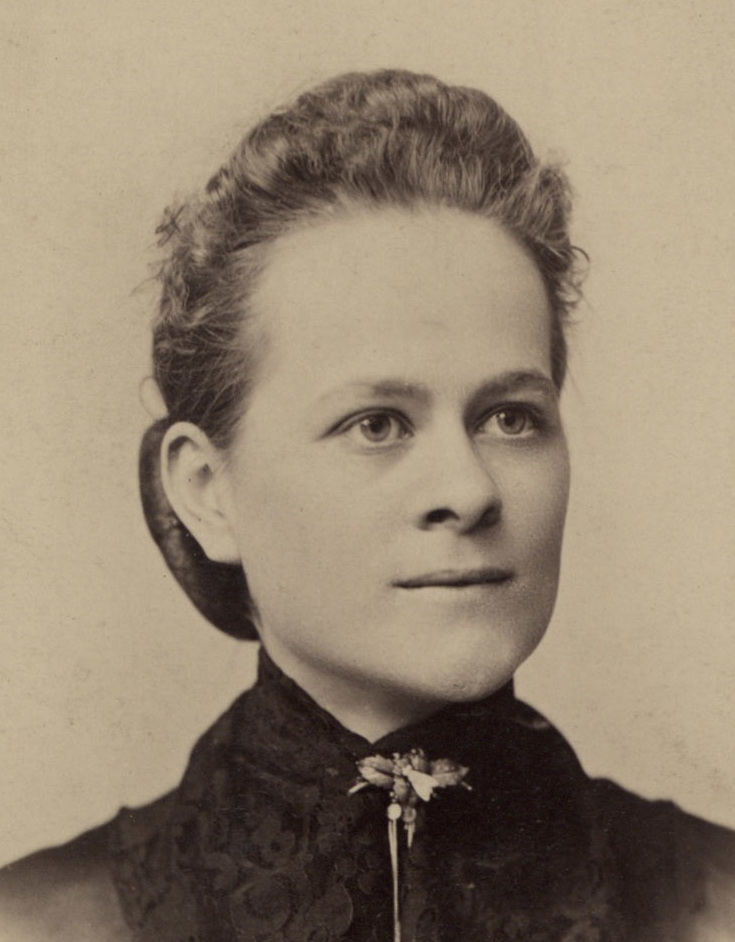
Longsdorff, c. 1891

Zatae Leola Sturgis Longsdorff Straw (April 16, 1866 – October 1, 1955) was a physician and a New Hampshire state representative.

== Early life and education ==
Zatae Leola Sturgis Longsdorff was born in Centerville, Pennsylvania, on April 16, 1866, the daughter of Dr. William Henry Longsdorff and his wife Lydia. Longsdorff grew up near Carlisle, Pennsylvania.

She attended Wellesley College in 1883. The next year Longsdorff enrolled at Dickinson College in Carlisle, Pennsylvania to study medicine, and was the first woman to graduate from that institution in 1887. She won the Pierson Prize in Oratory in 1886. Her father before her graduated from the same college in 1856 and her brother in 1879. After her, her sisters Hildegarde, Jessica and Persis attended Dickinson College as well, graduating in 1888, 1891 and 1894 respectively. In 1937, Dickinson College granted Longsdorff an honorary degree in science.

She specialized at the Woman's Medical College of Pennsylvania in Philadelphia, where she earned an M.D. in 1890.

== Career ==
Zatae Leola Longsdorff Straw was a prominent physician and was named head of the Manchester Medical Association.

After her graduation, Straw worked for one year as an intern at the New England Hospital for Women and Children, and then moved to Blackfoot, Idaho, and became the resident physician at Fort Hall Indian Reservation. After her marriage Straw opened a medical practice in Manchester, New Hampshire, one of the first female physicians not only in the city but also in the state.

When she entered politics, she was one of the first female legislators in New Hampshire.

In November 1923 Straw was elected to the New Hampshire House of Representatives by Manchester's 4th ward as a Republican. She won reelection in November 1925. During her double term she held a seat on, and was also chairman of the Committee on Health, and was on the committee on Fisheries and Game (she was an avid hunter and fisher as well).

In 1926, she was the first woman to serve as the chairman of the New Hampshire Republican State Convention. Close to the end of her second term, Straw tried for a New Hampshire Senate seat. She did not win but was the first woman to try for such a position.

Straw was vice president, and in 1935 state president, of the New Hampshire Department of the American Legion Auxiliary.

In 1941, she received a gold medal from the New Hampshire Medical Society in honour of her long service to medicine in the state. She served as president of the American Medical Society, the first woman to hold this position.

== Personal life ==
In 1891, after three years living in Idaho, Longsdorff returned to the U.S. East Coast. On November 12, 1891, she married Amos Gale Straw (1864–1926), a physician from Manchester, New Hampshire. They had four children: Enid Constance (1900–1981), Zatae Gale (1906–1930), Wayne C. (1909–1931), and David Gale (1923–1979). They also adopted another child, Gertrude Grey (1898–1986).

She died on October 1, 1955, and is buried at the Pine Grove Cemetery in Manchester, New Hampshire.

Soon after her death the Manchester Union Leader touted her as "one of New Hampshire's most distinguished women".
