= Emily Nkanga =

Nigerian–British photographer and filmmaker

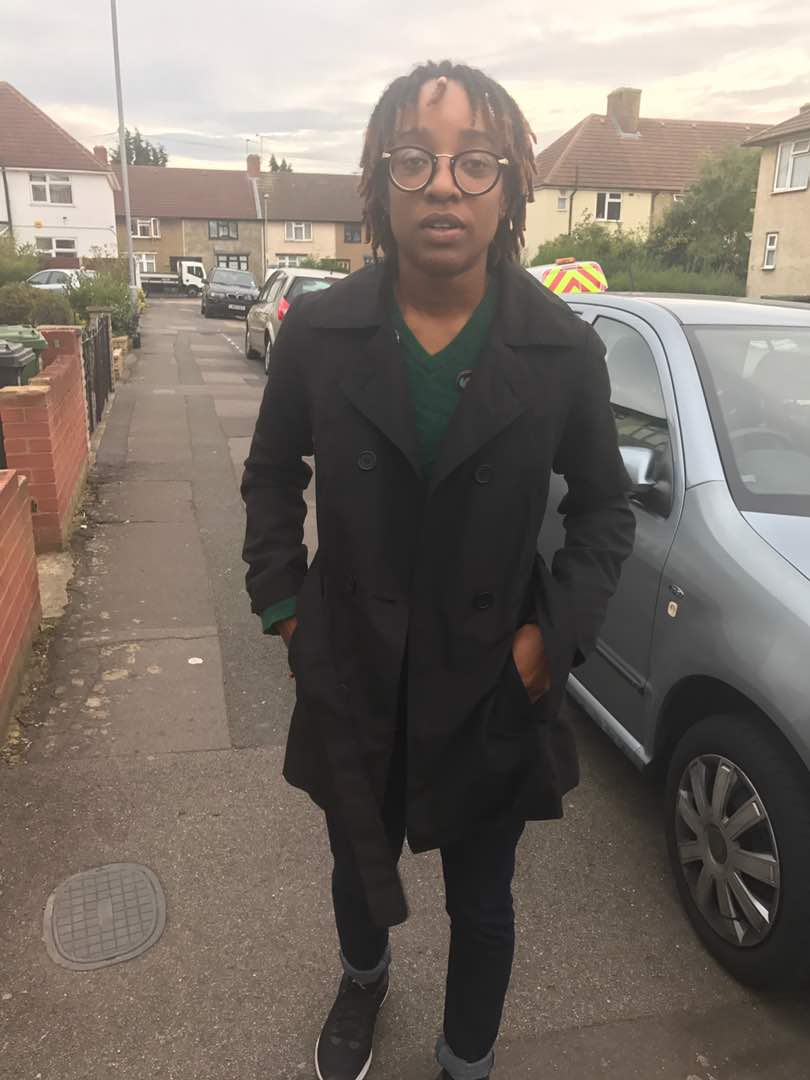
- Emily Nkanga in London (2017)
- Born: Emily Oluwatobi Nkanga; 21 May 1995 (age 31); Lagos State, Nigeria
- Occupation: Photographer
- Years active: 2012–present
- Website: www.emilynkanga.com

Emily Nkanga is a Nigerian–British photographer and filmmaker. She was born on the 21st of May, 1995. Nkanga is best known for her works covering singers Koker, Aramide, Boj, Olamide, Jidenna, Not3s, Mr Eazi, Mayorkun, Adekunle Gold, Music Producer Sarz, Broadway actor Adesola Osakalumi, Footballer Tammy Abraham and legendary Nigerian singer Femi Kuti. Nkanga's photo-documentary with internally displaced persons (IDPs) in Northeast Nigeria affected by Boko Haram insurgents, has also enjoyed rave reviews.

== Early life and education ==
Nkanga was born and raised in Lagos to Air Commodore Idongesit (Retired) and Mrs Mosunsola Nkanga, she attended the Air Force Girls Comprehensive School, Jos, Plateau State, after which she studied Communications and Multimedia Design (TV/Film) at The American University of Nigeria, Yola, Adamawa State, Northern Nigeria. She has a masters of art in filmmaking from Goldsmiths' University of London.

== Career ==
In 2012, Nkanga began taking interest in photography after previously experimenting with other forms of art. She began an internship with renowned Nigerian photographer, August Udoh in his company Orbit Imagery, and after her internship in 2013, she got a break into the entertainment industry. In 2014, with the mentoring of The Zone Agency (then M.et al. Entertainment), Nkanga began taking pictures at live events and concerts.

In October 2016, she launched Clicks and Tones; a photography trademark operating under her company, Emily Nkanga Photography, which focuses solely on documenting music concerts. A year later, Clicks and tones evolved into a media platform creating visual content to promote non-mainstream artistes with Nkanga remaining as the creative director.

=== 2014 to present day ===
Since 2014, Nkanga has built a significant client base made up of A-list Nigerian celebrities and Organizations; including Olamide, M.I Abaga, Falz, YCEE, Lil Kesh, Reminisce, Runtown, Trace TV, Chocolate City Music among others. She has also worked for the Lagos State Government, Let’s Talk Humanity and Nigerian Urban Reproductive Health Initiative (NURHI); a project which is funded by the Bill and Melinda Gates Foundation. Nkanga has been involved in a number of projects, including an ethnographic research/documentation of the Boko Haram internally displaced people in northeast Nigeria.

Nkanga is the eye behind Rapper Olamide's 6th album cover (The Glory), Lil Kesh's first album cover, Ycee's the first wave EP cover, Maryokun's first album cover, The Mayor of Lagos and promotional images for Mr Eazi's Lagos to London mixtape. In 2018, Nkanga started handling tour content for British singer Not3s.

== Awards and recognition ==
Nkanga has been recognized by several Nigerian mainstream newspapers, including The Nation, Vanguard, The Guardian Newspapers, Daily Tribune, This Day, The Sun, My Streetz Magazine, Inside Watch Africa, Pulse Nigeria, 360 Nobs among others. In August 2014, Nkanga won the Nigeria Teen Choice (NTC) Award for the most outstanding female in photography. She was also named as one of the "20 upcoming young photographers to watch" by City People Magazine in July 2014 and in 2016, she won the Ibom Future Youth Award in creative photography.
