= Robert Davidson (educator) =

American educator and minister (1750–1812)

- Born: 1750; Elkton, Province of Maryland, British America
- Died: December 13, 1812 (aged 61–62)
- Education: University of Pennsylvania
- Occupations: Educator; minister
- Years active: 1773–1809

Robert Davidson (1750 – December 13, 1812) was an American educator and minister.

== Early life and education ==
Davidson was born in Elkton, Maryland in 1750. He graduated at the University of Pennsylvania in 1771.

== Career ==
Davidson was appointed instructor at the University of Pennsylvania in 1773, and in 1774 was given the chair of history and belles-lettres.

In 1774, he was also licensed to preach, and a year later was ordained by the second Philadelphia presbytery, becoming Dr. Ewing's assistant in the first church. In 1775, he composed a metrical dialogue, which was recited at commencement before the Continental Congress, and in July of the same year, one month after the battle of Bunker Hill, delivered before several military companies a sermon from the text “For there fell down many slain, because the war was of God.”

In 1777, the occupation of Philadelphia by the British compelled Davidson to retire to Delaware. In 1783, Davidson was elected a member of the American Philosophical Society. In 1784 he was appointed vice-president of the newly organized Dickinson College, Carlisle, Pennsylvania, and given the chair of history and belles-lettres there, also acting as pastor of the Presbyterian church in Carlisle. He held this last office for the rest of his life, and succeeded in harmonizing a discordant congregation. In 1794 he preached twice before troops on their way to suppress the whiskey insurrection, and in 1799 delivered a eulogy of Washington. After Dr. Nisbet's death in 1804, Davidson discharged the duties of president of the college till 1809, when he resigned.

Davidson had a reputation as a scholar, but was especially interested astronomy, and invented a cosmosphere or compound globe. He was also a skillful draughtsman, and was a composer of sacred music. Besides sermons, he published an “Epitome of Geography, in Verse,” for the use of schools (1784); “The Christian's A, B, C,” or the 119th psalm in metre, each stanza beginning with a different letter (1811); and a “New Metrical Version of the Psalms,” with annotations (1812).

== Personal life ==
His son, Robert Davidson, clergyman, born in Carlisle, Pennsylvania, February 23, 1808; died in Philadelphia, April 6, 1876, was graduated at Dickinson College in 1828, and Princeton Theological Seminary in 1831. He was pastor of the second Presbyterian church in Lexington, Kentucky, from 1832 to 1840, and in 1840 year became president of Transylvania University there. After his resignation in 1842, he held pastorates in New Brunswick, New Jersey, in 1843–1859, New York City in 1860–64, and Huntington, Long Island, in 1864–68, moving again to Philadelphia in the latter year. Davidson was for a quarter of a century a member of the American Board of Commissioners for Foreign Missions, was permanent clerk of the General Assembly in 1845–1850, and in 1869 was a delegate to the General Assembly of the Free Church of Scotland, in Edinburgh.

== Death ==
Davidson died on December 13, 1812.

== Notes ==
Religious titles
Preceded by The Rev. John McKnight	Moderator of the 8th General Assembly of the Presbyterian Church in the United States of America; 1796–1797	Succeeded by The Rev. William Mackay Tennent
