= William Durden =

Dickinson College Alumnus and President

William G. Durden
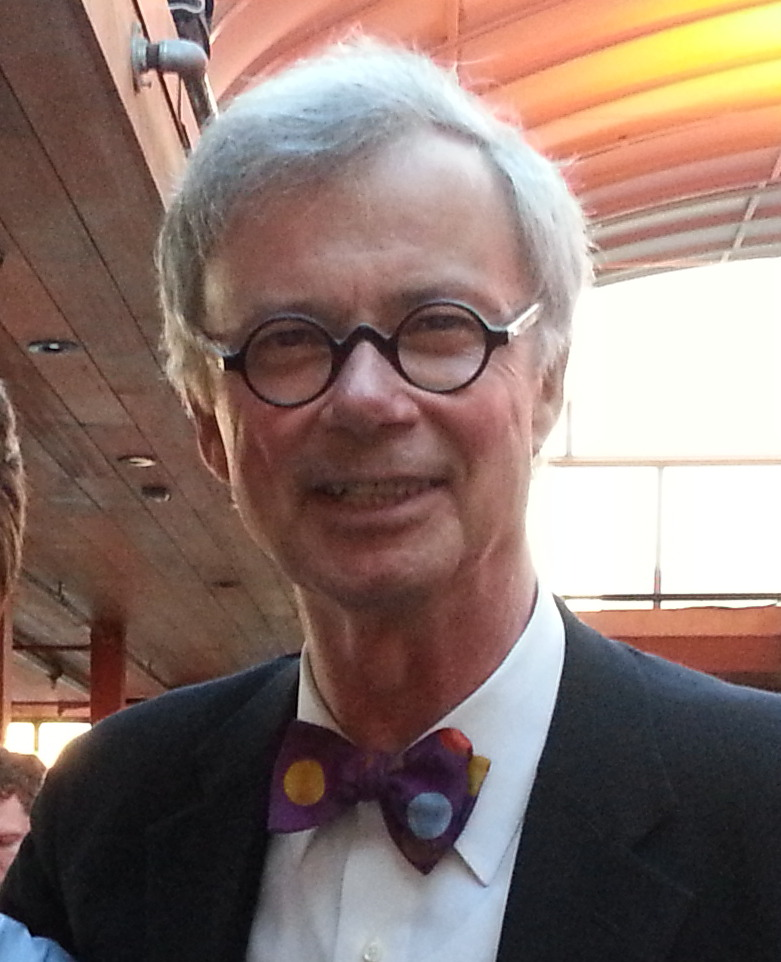

27th President of Dickinson College
- In office 1999–2013
- Preceded by: A. Lee Fritschler
- Succeeded by: Nancy A. Roseman

Personal details
- Spouse: Elke Durden
- Education: Dickinson College, Johns Hopkins University

William G. Durden is a former president of Dickinson College. He was a Fulbright scholar and a recipient of the Klingenstein Fellowship from Teacher's College, Columbia University.

== Education ==
Durden completed high school at The Albany Academy in Albany, New York. He was one of the first generation in his family to attend college, receiving a B.A. degree from Dickinson in 1971 and M.A. and Ph.D. degrees in German languages and literature from Johns Hopkins University. While a student at Dickinson, he was a member of the Theta Chi fraternity.

== Career ==
Durden was the executive director of the Johns Hopkins University Center for Talented Youth for 16 years and a member of the university's German Department. For 11 of his years at Hopkins, he was a senior education consultant for the U.S. Department of State and chair of its Advisory Committee on Exceptional Children and Youth. Durden has also served as president of the Sylvan Academy of Sylvan Learning Systems, Inc. and as vice-president for academic affairs of the Caliber Learning Network, a joint distance-learning venture of Sylvan and MCI.

== Dickinson College president ==
He assumed the presidency of Dickinson College on July 1, 1999, and was inaugurated on October 30, 1999.

During his presidency Durden led several sweeping changes at Dickinson to re-establish a leading role in Liberal Arts education. Durden oversaw the combination of former Library and Information Technology departments into Library and Information Services while also updating the college's antiquated student record systems. Academics were improved and the focus on international education strengthened. Durden was also a strong proponent of the role of Liberal Arts education in business training. Dickinson grew to renown for sustainable and green education initiatives during Durden's presidency.

In 2008, President Durden was a signatory to the Amethyst Initiative, an organization urging a public debate about reconsidering the legal drinking age of 21.

Durden left office with the inauguration of Nancy Roseman on September 28, 2013.

== Appointments ==
Durden was a mentor for the American Council on Education Fellows Program, the premier higher education leadership development program in the US. He was the mentor for 2004-2005 ACE Fellow Michael B. Brown (now associate dean of the Thomas Harriot College of Arts and Sciences at East Carolina University). In 2007-08, Durden served as chairman of the Annapolis Group subcommittee working on proposing an alternative to the U.S. News & World Report rankings of colleges. Recently, he was appointed chair of the advisory board of the Center for the International Exchange of Scholars, Fulbright Scholar Program. He is also a board member of Walden University, a for-profit higher education institute.

== Legacy ==
Durden was well known for wearing colorful bow ties on campus and provided graduating students with a video of how to wear a bow tie.

The Durden Athletics Training Centre was announced in 2012 after a gift of $6 million from Samuel G. Rose '58 and Julie Walters. The center features a new two-story, 22,000-square-foot (2,000 m^{2}) athletics-training center replacing the 1960s-era locker rooms at Dickinson’s Biddle Field. The new facility was named the Durden Athletic Training Center to honor the tenure of President William G. Durden ’71 and his wife, Dr. Elke Durden.
