= Henry Clarke (American businessman) =

American businessman and venture capitalist

Henry DeBrunner Clarke Jr. (May 19, 1933 – March 31, 2013) was an American businessman and venture capitalist. Clarke is credited with expanding the Klondike bar from its origins as a local dessert, eaten in parts of Ohio and Western Pennsylvania, into a popular, national ice cream brand.

== Early life and education ==
Clarke was born in Pittsburgh, Pennsylvania, on May 19, 1933. He graduated from Carson Long Military Academy, a boarding school in New Bloomfield, Pennsylvania. Clarke earned a bachelor's degree in 1955 from Dickinson College in Carlisle, Pennsylvania.

== Career ==
Clarke founded his own company, Clabir, headquartered in Greenwich, Connecticut. The name "Clabir" was created by combining his last name "Clarke" with his mother's name, "Bird." By the 1970s and 1980s, Clabir enjoyed widespread from Wall Street and the larger business community. Clabir controlled a number of companies ranging from consumer food products to defense, including General Defense, which manufactured military hardware, including tank ordnance.

In 1976, Clarke purchased the rights to the Klondike bar, frozen vanilla ice cream square which had been manufactured and sold by the Isaly's restaurant chain since the 1930s. Clarke introduced Klondike bars to consumers throughout the United States during the 1980s. Under Clarke, sales of the Klondike bar increased from $800,000 annually at the time of the acquisition by Clabir to more than $60 million.

In 1989, after he had sold Klondike due to a corporate hostile take over, Clarke entered the British ice cream market. Clarke had signed an agreement of non-competition when he sold Klondike, which limited his ability to market similar products in the U.S. domestic market. However, it did not preclude him from pursuing ventures in the United Kingdom. He initially purchased a group of ice cream brands from Hillsdown Holdings in 1989. However, his breakthrough into the British market came when he acquired Lyons Maid, a major ice cream brand, from Allied Lyons for just £13.3 million . Clarke and his three sons reformed Lyons Maid. He combined all of Lyons Maid's operations into two new, modern factories. He repackaged Zoom lollipops, which led to an increase in sales. Clarke also moved into direct competition with Häagen-Dazs by introducing super premium ice cream and marketing Lyons Maid products at high-profile venues, such as Wimbledon.

Clarke founded the Clarke Forum for Contemporary Issues at Dickinson College, his alma mater. He served as a Dickinson trustee from 1978 until his death in 2013.

== Death ==
Clarke died from Alzheimer's disease on March 31, 2013, at the age of 79. He was survived by his wife, Donna, and seven children.
