= Margee Ensign =

Margee M. Ensign

Board Chair, Global Centre for Rehumanising Democracy (GCRD)
- Incumbent
- Assumed office 2025

Personal details
- Born: 1954 (age 71–72)
- Education: New College of Florida, University of Maryland University College
- Website: GCRD profile

Margee M. Ensign (born 3 October 1954) is currently a Senior Fellow at Bard College and Board Chair of the Global Centre for Rehumanising Democracy, a UK-based think tank. Other Board member positions include the Centre for Peace, Democratic Governance and Development in Rwanda, the President's Advisory Committee of the Association of International Education Administrators and AltLiberalArts.

== Life ==
Ensign was born in Los Angeles, California. She earned her BA in peace studies and international relations from New College of Florida, and her PhD in international political economy from the University of Maryland. She began her academic and administrative career at Columbia University in New York City as assistant professor of politics and economy and director of the International Political Economy Program, 1984-89.

In 1989 she relocated to Washington, DC, where she became a visiting professor at American University and director of the Development Studies Program sponsored by USAID and the U.S. Department of State and moved to Tulane University as associate professor and director of Tulane’s Institute for International Development, located in Washington, DC, which offered master's and Ph.D. degrees in international development on three continents using technology innovative for the time.

In 1999 she assumed the position of dean of the School of International Studies at the University of the Pacific in California, where she was also appointed associate provost for international initiatives. She set up undergraduate and graduate programs in social entrepreneurship, Inter-American Studies, and intercultural relations. In 2010, Ensign moved to Yola, Nigeria, to become the third president of the American University of Nigeria, established using American pedagogy, and focused on its mission as Africa’s first “Development University.” There she oversaw the creation of the Graduate School, the School of Law, and the School of Engineering, community partnerships. And building of infrastructure (Library, Hotel/Conference Center, Graduation and events hall, green Administration building, and student and faculty housing). Her administration was marked by a focus on establishing AUN as a “Development University” paired with the school’s extensive work in the community, sustainability, and most notably the establishment of the Adamawa Peace Initiative. She led the (API), a peace initiative composed of religious and community leaders which successfully promoted peace and countered Boko Haram through education, humanitarian assistance for 300,000 refugees, and youth empowerment. Along with her head of security, Dr. Lionel Rawlins, she led the effort to bring several of the rescued Chibok girls, (whose kidnapping by Boko Haram had led to the global #BringBackOurGirls movement) to live and study at the American University of Nigeria on scholarship. For these efforts, she was honored by the Aurora Humanitarian Foundation as a Modern Day Hero.

In 2017, she returned to the United States to become the 29th president of Dickinson College. Not only did she steer that institution through the difficult COVID-19 pandemic, but President Ensign also launched a number of new initiatives that were interdisciplinary and global, stressing ethics, sustainability, and community engagement. She also oversaw the creation of Dickinson's first post-graduate program in conjunction with the Army War College in human security and humanitarian response. She returned to Nigeria to once again assume the presidency of the American University of Nigeria in July 2021. She was Vice-Chancellor of U.S. International University in Africa, in Nairobi, Kenya, from 2022-23 but her presidency was curtailed because of altitude illness.

Ensign is a scholar on development, on Africa, and—growing out of her experience in Rwanda—on genocide. She is the author and editor of six books, including Rwanda: History and Hope, and Confronting Genocide: Dehumanization, Denial, and Strategies for Prevention. She co-edited a recent Peace Review issue on Religion in War and Peace in Africa and most recently co-authored Transactional Radio Instruction: Improving Educational Outcomes for Children in Conflict Zones. She has presented at the World Economic Forum, many conferences on Genocide Against the Tutsi, Commonwealth Women's Forum, U.S. Chamber of Commerce Foundation, and the American Council on Education, and she has testified before Congress on global education, international affairs, and foreign assistance. Ensign has advocated for universities to play key roles in civic engagement with their communities.

Ensign has been interviewed multiple times by the BBC and CNN, and her writings have been published in The Washington Post, The Philadelphia Inquirer, The Hill, The Chronicle of Higher Education, Inside Higher Ed, The Army Times, The Huffington Post, and Hechinger Report, among others.

Ensign served as the president of the American University in Bulgaria between August 2023 and September 2025 .

== Works ==
Ensign is a scholar whose research has focused on international development and the implications of development assistance. Her works include:

- Co-author: Jacob, Jacob Udo-Udo; Ensign, Margee (2020). Transactional Radio Instruction. doi:10.1007/978-3-030-32369-1. ISBN 978-3-030-32368-4.
- Co-editor: Special Issue of the Journal Peace Review: A Journal of Social Justice 30(3) Volume 30, 2018 - Issue 4: SYMPOSIUM: RELIGION IN WAR AND PEACE IN AFRICA
- Ensign, Margee M. (2016). ""We are Obsessed with Peace": A Story of Peace Building in Northeastern Nigeria". Contemporary French and Francophone Studies. 20 (2): 168–175. doi:10.1080/17409292.2016.1144323.
- "Local Action to Protect Communities in Nigeria". Forced Migration Review. Oxford: 22–27. October 2016.
- Confronting Genocide in Rwanda, Editor. Apidama Press, 2014. Second edition, October 2015
- "Nigerian university tackles extremism and hunger". BBC News. 17 August 2016.
- Ensign, Margee; Bertrand, William (2010). Rwanda: History and Hope. University Press. ISBN 9780761849421.
- Private Bank Loans to Developing Countries: An Artificial Intelligence Model of Lending. London: Gordon and Breech, 1989 Reissued in a new volume published by Routledge Press, July 2010.
- Defining, Measuring, and Achieving Sustainable Development with Sam Samarasinghe. Tulane University CD-ROM Development Studies Program (DSP) August 1999
- “Economic Development Management and Entrepreneurship in the Health Sector in Columbia: Sustainable Development with a New Face”, with William Bertrand, Alfredo Ocampo, and Oscar Rojas in New York Health Sciences Journal, 1997, Vol 2 No 1, pp 63–75
- Ensign, Margee M.; Phillips, Warren R. (1993). "Decision Making and Development: A Glass Box Approach to Representation". Artificial Intelligence and International Politics. San Francisco: Westview Press. pp. 274–288. doi:10.4324/9780429033575-12. ISBN 9780429033575.

Ensign is a scholar whose works focus on international development and the implications of development assistance. Her works include:

- Doing Good or Doing Well?: Japan's Foreign Aid Program
- Images and Behavior of Private Bank Lending to Developing Countries.
- Rwanda: History and Hope, in which she and AUN Trustee and Tulane University Professor Dr. William Bertrand document Rwanda's rebuilding efforts since 1994.

Ensign started the New Foundation School (NFS) in 2014 at the American University of Nigeria (AUN) in Yola where she served as president during the height of Boko Haram's terrorist insurgency and now the president of the American University of Nigeria, 2021.

== Award ==
Ensign has received the following awards: Rotary International Paul Harris Fellow Award. In 2011 Ensign was awarded the "African Leadership Award in Educational Excellence" conferred upon her in London by African Leadership Magazine. Other awards include the African Leadership Award from the World Center for Corporate Social Responsibility, Women of Jama’atul Nasril Islam Humanitarian Award, Honorary Doctorates: American University of Paris and New College.
