= President of the University of Richmond =

American academic administration role

The President of the University of Richmond is the chief administrator of the University of Richmond and an ex officio member of the university's board of trustees. The current president is Kevin Hallock, formerly the dean of the SC Johnson College of Business at Cornell University.

== History ==
The University of Richmond was founded in 1830 as an academy created by the "Education Society" of the Baptist General Association of Virginia. In 1832, the academy was relocated and renamed the Virginia Baptist Seminary, and Robert Ryland was named superintendent. In 1840, the Virginia General Assembly passed articles of incorporation, and the seminary became a liberal arts college known as Richmond College. Ryland was named the institution's first president that year. From 1869 to 1895, the college changed to a faculty-run administration, and the position of president was eliminated. The position was restored in 1895 with the appointment of Frederic W. Boatwright as president. He would serve in that capacity for 51 years.

== Presidents of the University of Richmond ==
1. Robert Ryland (1840–1866)
2. Tiberius G. Jones (1866–1869)
3. Frederic W. Boatwright (1895–1946)
4. George M. Modlin (1946–1971)
5. E. Bruce Heilman (1971–1986 and 1987–1988)
6. Samuel A. Banks (1986–1987)
7. Richard L. Morrill (1988–1998)
8. William E. Cooper (1998–2007)
9. Edward L. Ayers (2007–2015)
10. Ronald Crutcher (2015–2021)
11. Kevin Hallock (2021–)

=== Chairmen of the Faculty of Richmond College (1869–1895) ===
1. Bennet Puryear (1869–1875, 1885–1888)
2. Herbert H. Harris (1875–1885, 1888–1895)
