= Richard L. Morrill =

American educator and administrator (born 1939)

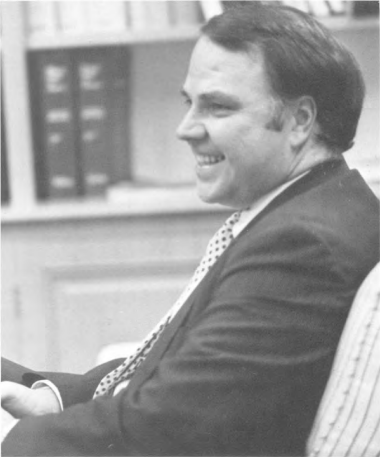
- Morrill in his office at Centre in 1984

7th President of the University of Richmond
- In office September 30, 1988 – June 30, 1998
- Preceded by: E. Bruce Heilman
- Succeeded by: William E. Cooper

18th President of Centre College
- In office June 1, 1982 – September 30, 1988
- Preceded by: Thomas A. Spragens
- Succeeded by: Michael F. Adams

16th President of Salem College
- In office August 1, 1979 – June 1, 1982
- Preceded by: Merrimon Cuninggim
- Succeeded by: Thomas V. Litzenburg Jr.

Personal details
- Born: Richard Leslie Morrill; June 4, 1939 (age 86) Hingham, Massachusetts, U.S.
- Spouse: Martha Leahy (m. 1964)
- Children: 2
- Education: Brown University (BA); Yale University (BDiv); Duke University (PhD)

Richard Leslie Morrill (born June 4, 1939) is an American educator and former academic administrator who is the chancellor of the University of Richmond. He was president of Salem College, Centre College, and the University of Richmond for various periods between 1979 and 1998.

Morrill earned undergraduate degrees from Brown University and Yale University and completed his doctorate at Duke University. He joined the faculty at Wells College in 1967 and afterwards taught at what is now Chatham University; his first position in administration came as executive assistant to the president at Chatham. He spent two years at Pennsylvania State University as a member of the faculty and administration afterward. In 1979, he was elected president of Salem College, a women's liberal arts college in Winston-Salem, North Carolina. In his term of nearly three years, he prioritized keeping Salem's focus on the liberal arts, and he completed roughly half of a $12.2 million fundraiser.

Morrill became president of Centre College in Danville, Kentucky, in June 1982. During his six year-term, Centre became the first hosts of the new Kentucky Governor's Scholars Program and received $3.5 million in grants from the F. W. Olin Foundation to build Franklin W. Olin Hall, which was dedicated in October 1988. The school had reached a record-high enrollment of 850 students by the end of his presidency and had increased faculty salaries by 60%. He departed Centre to become president of the University of Richmond, whose endowment doubled over the course of his ten-year term. The school hosted a U.S. presidential debate in October 1992 and completed a $164 million fundraiser near the end of Morrill's term. He retired effective at the end of the 1997–1998 academic year.

== Early life and education ==
Richard Leslie Morrill was born in Hingham, Massachusetts, on June 4, 1939. He received his Bachelor of Arts degree in history, magna cum laude, from Brown University in 1961. He earned a Bachelor of Divinity degree in religious thought from Yale University in 1964 and a Ph.D. in religion from the Duke University Graduate School of Arts and Sciences, where he was named a James B. Duke Fellow.

Morrill studied at the Paris Institute of Political Sciences as an undergraduate and later received an honorary degree from the École des Hautes Études Internationales.

== Career ==
=== Start in academia and president of Salem, 1967–1981 ===
Morrill began his career in academia when he joined the faculty at Wells College in Aurora, New York, in 1967. Afterwards, he taught at Chatham College—now Chatham University—in Pittsburgh. He was appointed to his first position in administration at Chatham as executive assistant to president Edward D. Eddy and later associate provost. In 1977, he became executive assistant to the provost at Pennsylvania State University while also holding a faculty position as associate professor of religion; he remained at Penn State for two years.

Morrill was elected president of Salem College, a private women's liberal arts college in Winston-Salem, North Carolina, in April 1979. He took office on August 1 of that year, making him Salem's sixteenth president. His formal inauguration was held on October 16, 1979; during his inaugural address, he focused on the importance of keeping Salem a small liberal arts college. He also noted his focus of keeping Salem exclusively a women's college, in contrast to an "unspoken expectation" of coeducation nationwide. In December 1980, Salem received a $350,000 grant from the National Endowment for the Humanities. He began a five-year fundraiser with a $12.2 million goal, of which Salem raised approximately half before Morrill's departure. In June 1981, Salem broke ground on a new student life center, which opened in September 1982 at a total cost of $2.1 million.

=== Centre College, 1982–1988 ===
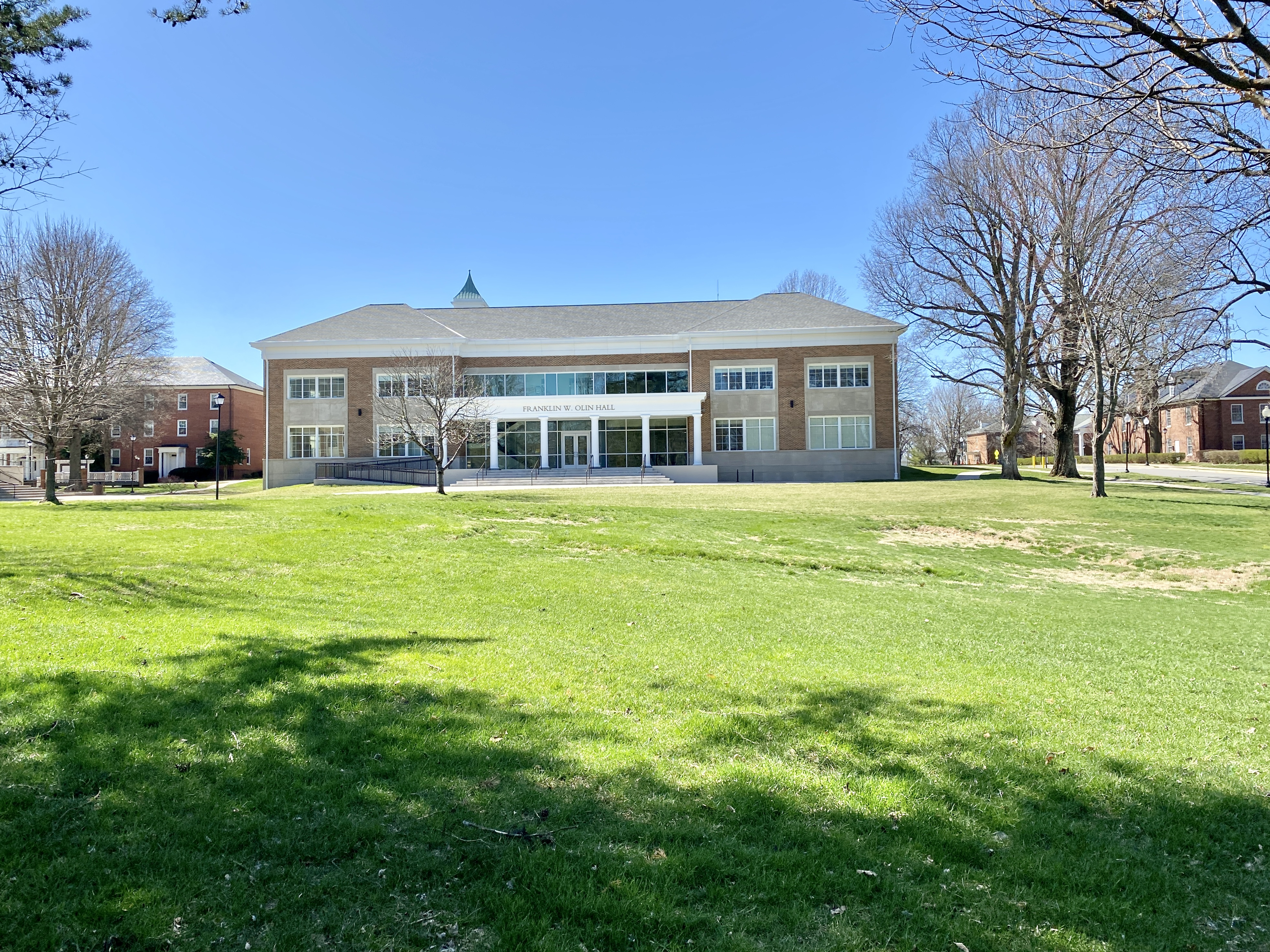
Franklin W. Olin Hall (pictured in 2022) was constructed during Morrill's tenure at Centre.

Morrill accepted the presidency of Centre College, in Danville, Kentucky, on November 2, 1981, and was the commencement speaker at the school's graduation on May 30, 1982. He officially assumed office on June 1, 1982, and he was formally inaugurated as Centre's 18th president on Apri 23, 1983. In 1987, Centre hosted former US president Jimmy Carter as its commencement speaker. During Morrill's time at Centre, he completed the "Fund for the Future" fundraising campaign, begun by Thomas A. Spragens, with nearly $40 million raised. In October 1982, Governor John Y. Brown Jr. announced the founding of what would become the Kentucky Governor's Scholars Program, a five-week, residential academic enrichment experience; Salem had hosted North Carolina's version of the program since 1962, and Morrill secured Centre's place as the first host of the Kentucky program. The program ran as planned on Centre's campus from July 3 to August 5, 1983, with 250 rising high school seniors in attendance. In September 1986, the college received a $3 million grant from the F. W. Olin Foundation, which was dedicated to a new sciences building. After receiving a subsequent $500,000 grant from the Olin Foundation a year later, the college dedicated Franklin W. Olin Hall in October 1988. In March 1987, Morrill and the college announced a three-year, $33 million fundraiser which would allow Centre to raise faculty salaries and financial aid for students and also included funds to renovate Grace Doherty Library, Young Hall, and several dormitory buildings. After the original amount was raised in ten months, the trustees voted to increase the target to $38 million, which was exceeded by October 1989.

Morrill announced his departure from Centre on April 22, 1988, in order to take the presidency of the University of Richmond in Richmond, Virginia. Speculation had arisen several days earlier as to whether Richmond would offer the job to Morrill, who was publicly a finalist for the position, and as to what Morrill's final decision would be. Morrill's resignation was effective September 30, 1988; Centre's vice president, William H. Breeze, was appointed acting president and Michael F. Adams, then the vice president for university affairs at Pepperdine University, was ultimately selected to succeed Morrill. By the time he left Centre, the school's endowment had reached $230 million, faculty salaries had grown by 60 percent, and enrollment had reached a record-high 850 students.

=== University of Richmond, 1988–1998 ===
Morrill took office as Richmond's seventh president on September 30, 1988. Within the first two weeks of his presidency, the school's board of trustees approved the creation of the Jepson School of Leadership Studies. He was formally inaugurated on March 18, 1989. The following month, he received an honorary degree from, and delivered the commencement address at, Averett College (now Averett University) in Danville, Virginia. Near the beginning of the 1989–1990 academic year, Richmond was listed No. 2 in a "regional colleges and universities" ranking by U.S. News & World Report, though Morrill publicly called their methodology into question after the rankings were released. In August 1992, Richmond was announced as a host for a U.S. presidential debate, which ultimately took place on October 15 of that year. The debate cost the school $500,000 (equivalent to $1,120,000 in 2024) to host, an amount that was raised in four days from "between 10 and 20 individuals and corporations", according to The Roanoke Times.

Morrill was paid a salary of $175,750 (equivalent to $394,000 in 2024) as president for the 1991–1992 fiscal year; this increased to $185,250 (equivalent to $403,000 in 2024) the following year and, along with benefits, contributed to his total earnings of $223,758 (equivalent to $487,000 in 2024) in 1992–1993. By 1995–1996, his earnings had increased to $255,531 (equivalent to $512,000 in 2024), making him the highest-paid private college president in Virginia.

Morrill announced his resignation from Richmond on March 7, 1997, set to take effect at the end of the end of the 1997–1998 academic year. His successor, William E. Cooper, was announced in May 1998 and took office July 1 of that year. During Morrill's ten-year term at Richmond, the school doubled its endowment and completed a fundraising campaign which raised $164 million.

Upon leaving Richmond's presidency, he became the school's chancellor and was titled distinguished university professor of ethics and democratic values.

=== Post-presidency, 1998–present ===
Morrill became president of the Teagle Foundation, a liberal-arts-focused philanthropic organization in 2010. He is currently a member of the advisory board of the Kenan Institute for Ethics at Duke University and a senior consultant with the Association of Governing Boards of Universities and Colleges. During his career, he was president of the Southern Association of Colleges and Schools, and he was a member of the board of the Library of Virginia Foundation.

== Personal life ==
Morrill married Martha Leahy in New Haven, Connecticut, on June 27, 1964. They have two children. Morrill is a member of the Ordre des Palmes académiques.

== Publications ==
- Teaching Values in College. San Francisco, California: Jossey-Bass Publishers. 1980. ISBN 0875894755.
- Strategic Leadership in Academic Affairs: Clarifying the Board's Responsibilities. Association of Governing Boards of Universities and Colleges. 2002. ISBN 9789990932850.
- Strategic Leadership: Integrating Strategy and Leadership in Colleges and Universities. Rowman & Littlefield Publishers. 2010. ISBN 9781607096542.

Academic offices
Preceded by E. Bruce Heilman	President of the University of Richmond; 1988—1998	Succeeded by William E. Cooper
Preceded by Thomas A. Spragens	President of Centre College; 1982—1988	Succeeded by Michael F. Adams
Preceded by Merrimon Cuninggim	President of Salem College; 1979—1982	Succeeded by Thomas V. Litzenburg Jr.
