= Edward L. Ayers =

American historian (born 1953)

President of the University of Richmond
- In office July 1, 2007 – July 1, 2015
- Preceded by: William E. Cooper
- Succeeded by: Ronald Crutcher

Personal details
- Born: Edward Lynn Ayers; January 22, 1953 (age 73) Asheville, North Carolina, U.S.
- Spouse: Abby Ayers
- Children: 2
- Education: University of Tennessee (BA); Yale University (MA), (PhD)
- Occupation: Educator; historian
- Website: www.edwardayers.com

Edward Lynn Ayers (born January 22, 1953) is an American historian, professor, administrator, and university president. In July 2013, he was awarded the National Humanities Medal by President Barack Obama at a White House ceremony for Ayers's "commitment to making our history as widely available and accessible as possible." He served as the president of the Organization of American Historians in 2017–18.

== Early life and education ==
Ayers was born on January 22, 1953 in Asheville, North Carolina.

Ayers received a Bachelor of Arts degree in American studies from the University of Tennessee in 1974, summa cum laude, and a doctorate in American Studies from Yale University in 1980.

== Career ==
Ayers taught at the University of Virginia from 1980 to 2007, where he became the Hugh P. Kelly Professor of History and the Buckner W. Clay Dean of the College and Graduate School of Arts and Sciences from 2001 through 2007. He was elected a Fellow of the American Academy of Arts and Sciences in 2001.

At Virginia, Ayers won several teaching prizes, including U.S. Professor of the Year for Doctoral and Research Universities, Carnegie Foundation for the Advancement of Teaching and Council for Advancement and Support of Education in 2003, and the State Council of Higher Education in Virginia Outstanding Faculty Award in 1991. The university awarded Ayers its highest honor, the Thomas Jefferson Award, in 2006. Ayers directed the dissertations of more than forty doctoral students at Virginia, most of them in the history of the American South.

Elected president of the University of Richmond in 2007, Ayers developed The Richmond Promise, a five-year strategic plan to guide University priorities. During his term, the university increased students of color from 11 percent to 28 percent, doubled the percentage of students receiving Pell Grants, covered the full cost of attendance for all Virginia students with family income below $60,000, and created the Richmond Guarantee, a paid summer fellowship for all undergraduate students. Ayers completed his term as president in 2015, when he was named the Tucker-Boatwright Professor of the Humanities.

In 2025 Ayers was named as the 2026 Fritz and Claudine Kundrun Fellow at the Robert H. Smith International Center for Jefferson Studies. Cited by Monticello as their most prestigious, the nine-month fellowship will enable Dr Ayers to devote his time to research and writing on topics directly related to Thomas Jefferson, his times, and legacy.

Ayers is the author of six and editor of seven books on the history of nineteenth-century America. The Promise of the New South: Life After Reconstruction was a finalist for both the National Book Award and the Pulitzer Prize. His book, In the Presence of Mine Enemies, Civil War in the Heart of America, won the Bancroft Prize for distinguished writing in American history and the Beveridge Award for the best book in English on the history of the Americas since 1492. The Thin Light of Freedom: The Civil War and Emancipation in the Heart of America, was awarded the Lincoln Prize from the Gilder Lehrman Institute and the Avery O. Craven Award from the Organization of American Historians. Southern Journey: The Migrations of the American South, 1790-2020, narrates the evolution of southern history through the migration of indigenous, white, Black, and immigrant people, with maps created by Justin Madron and Nathaniel Ayers. What Caused the Civil War is a collection of original essays. Edward Ayers co-edited The Oxford Book of the American South and edited America's War for the American Library Association and the National Endowment for the Humanities.

== New American History ==
In 2015, Ayers founded New American History, an initiative to enable engaged and innovative learning in history at all grade levels. It is based at the University of Richmond and funded through philanthropic support.

The project integrates Bunk, a daily curation of representations of the American past in multiple media; American Panorama, a digital atlas of United States history produced at the Digital Scholarship Lab at the University of Richmond; BackStory, a radio show and podcast; and The Future of America's Past, a video series created by Field Studio. New American History provides Learning Resources tailored to different grade levels, and partners with organizations devoted to supporting teachers and students of United States history. In 2025, Ayers released a video series, Upgrading Your American History, on the New American History YouTube channel, to address teaching history in a moment of deep political polarization.

== Digital history ==
Ayers pioneered the field of digital history, overseeing the Valley of the Shadow project at the University of Virginia from 1991 through 2007. The project presented an interactive archive dedicated to two communities in the American Civil War, produced in collaboration with William G. Thomas III and Anne Sarah Rubin. The project won the Lincoln Prize from the Gilder Lehrman Institute in 2001 and the James Harvey Robinson Prize for Outstanding Aid to Teaching History, American Historical Association (AHA) in 2002. The project was named one of the fifty most important efforts sponsored by the National Endowment for the Humanities in its first fifty years. In 2022, on the 30th anniversary of the project, New American History released an updated version of the Valley of the Shadow with enhanced images and search features.

In 2007, Ayers founded the Digital Scholarship Lab at the University of Richmond, where he now serves as a senior research fellow. The Lab received the 2019 Roy Rosenzweig Prize for Innovation in Digital History for a freely available new media project, American Panorama: An Atlas of United States History. In 2021, Edward Ayers, Justin Madron, and Nathaniel Ayers received accolades for the Digital Scholarship Lab project Southern Journey: The Migrations of the American South, 1790–2020, at the prestigious ESRI User Conference. Southern Journey earned third place in the "Spatial Analysis ArcGIS StoryMaps" category and received the top prize overall in both "Best Cartography" and "ICA and IMIA Recognition of Excellence in Cartography."

== Public history ==
Ayers has been active in public history. From 2008 through 2020 he served as one of the founding co-hosts of BackStory, based at Virginia Humanities, alongside Peter Onuf, Brian Balogh, Joanne B. Freeman, and N. D. B. Connolly from 2008 to 2020. BackStory was broadcast on more than 200 stations around the country and was downloaded millions of times as a podcast. The program selected topics from current headlines and examined each in a historical context. Archived episodes continue to be made available by the Virginia Humanities and the American Archive of Public Broadcasting (AAPB).

Ayers is the host of The Future of America's Past, a program produced for Virginia Public Media by Field Studio Films and distributed nationally. The show received multiple awards for its first two seasons. The pilot episode, "Freedom's Fortress", received a 2019 Capital Region Emmy Award for its directors and producers, Hannah Ayers and Lance Warren. Two additional episodes received recognition at the 2020 Capital Region Emmy Awards. "A Public Calamity" received a Capital Region Emmy Award for Historical/Cultural Short Form Content, and "School Interrupted" received an Emmy for Magazine Program (Single Program).

Ayers has served on the boards of the National Endowment for the Humanities, the American Council for Education, the Organization of American Historians, the Gilder Lehrman Institute for American History, Colonial Williamsburg, Virginia Humanities, and the Valentine Museum. He was founding chair of the board of the American Civil War Museum from 2013 through 2019. He has also served Richmond and the state of Virginia on the Monument Avenue Commission, the Fort Monroe Authority, the African American History Education Commission, and the Commission for Historical Statues in the United States Capitol.

== Personal life ==
Ayers is married to Abby Ayers. They have two grown children, Nathaniel Ayers and Hannah Ayers.

== Academic service ==
- Organization of American Historians, president (2017–2018); executive board officer (2017–2020)
- American Council for Education, executive committee and co-chair of accreditation committee, 2008–2012
- National Humanities Center, board member, 2007–2011
- National Council for the Humanities, 2000–2004, appointed by the president of the United States to advise the National Endowment for the Humanities

== Honors ==
- Lincoln Prize (2018), for The Thin Light of Freedom: The Civil War and Emancipation in the Heart of America
- National Humanities Medal (2012), "for his commitment to making our history as widely available and accessible as possible." (2012)
- Bancroft Prize, In The Presence of Mine Enemies: War in the Heart of America, 1859-1863 (2004)
- National Council on the Humanities, Presidential Appointee (2000–2004)
- U.S. Professor of the Year for Doctoral and Research Universities, Carnegie Foundation for the Advancement of Teaching and Council for Advancement and Support of Education (2003)
- Fellow of the American Academy of Arts and Sciences (elected 2001)
- Lincoln Prize (2001), with Anne S. Rubin, and William G. Thomas, for Valley of the Shadow: The Eve of War (CD-ROM)
- James A. Rawley Prize from the Organization of American Historians (1993), for The Promise of the New South
- Pulitzer Prize Finalist – History (1993), for The Promise of the New South
- National Book Award Finalist – Nonfiction (1992), for The Promise of the New South
- Distinguished Fellow of the Georgia Historical Society

== Books ==
- Vengeance and Justice: Crime and Punishment in the Nineteenth-Century American South, (Oxford University Press, 1984; paperback edition, 1986. ISBN 978-0-19-503988-7.)
- The Edge of the South: Life in Nineteenth-Century Virginia, co-edited with John C. Willis, [University Press of Virginia, 1991. ISBN 978-0-8139-1298-1.)
- The Promise of the New South: Life after Reconstruction, (Oxford University Press, 1992; paperback edition, 1993; abridged edition, 1995; 15th Anniversary Edition, 2007. ISBN 978-0-19-532688-8.)
- All Over the Map: Rethinking American Regions, co-editor and co-author, (Johns Hopkins University Press, 1996. ISBN 978-0-8018-5392-0.)
- The Oxford Book of the American South: Testimony, Memory, and Fiction, edited with Bradley Mittendorf, (Oxford University Press, 1997. ISBN 978-0-19-512493-4.)
- The Valley of the Shadow: Two Communities in the American Civil War – The Eve of War, CD-ROM and book co-authored with Anne S. Rubin, (W.W. Norton & Company, 2000. ISBN 978-0-393-04604-5.)
- In the Presence of Mine Enemies: War in the Heart of America, 1859–1863, (W.W. Norton & Company, 2003. ISBN 978-0-393-32601-7.)
- What Caused the Civil War? Reflections on the South and Southern History, (W.W. Norton & Company, 2005. ISBN 978-0-393-05947-2.)
- The Crucible of the Civil War: Virginia from Secession to Commemoration, edited with Gary Gallagher and Andrew Torget, (University of Virginia Press, 2006. ISBN 978-0-8139-2552-3.)
- America on the Eve of the Civil War, edited with Carolyn R. Martin, (University of Virginia Press, 2010. ISBN 978-0-8139-3063-3.)
- America's War: Talking about the Civil War and Emancipation on their 150th Anniversaries, (co-published by the American Library Association and the National Endowment for the Humanities, 2011. ISBN 978-0-8389-9308-8.)
- The Thin Light of Freedom: The Civil War and Emancipation in the Heart of America, (W. W. Norton & Company, 2017. ISBN 0393292630, 978-0393292633.)
- Southern Journey: The Migrations of the American South, 1790–2020, (Louisiana State University Press, 2020. ISBN 9780807173015.)
- American Visions: The United States, 1800–1860, (W. W. Norton & Company, 2023. ISBN 9780393881264.)

Academic offices
| Preceded by William E. Cooper | President of the University of Richmond; 2007–2015 | Succeeded by Ronald Crutcher |
