= H. Gerald Quigg =

American fundraising and philanthropy specialist (born 1937)

- Born: Harry Gerald Quigg; February 5, 1937 (age 89); New Jersey, U.S.
- Education: University of Delaware
- Occupations: Fundraising specialist; philanthropy specialist
- Years active: 1964–1997
- Spouse: Lorraine Olsen (m. 1958)
- Children: 3

Harry Gerald Quigg (born February 5, 1937) is an American specialist in non-profit philanthropy and fund-raising who spent most of his career as Vice President of Development at the University of Richmond in Richmond, Virginia.

== Early life and education ==
Quigg was born on February 5, 1937, in New Jersey to Joseph Quigg and Catherine Curry. Quigg was educated at the University of Delaware from where he graduated as a history major in 1959. He was captain of the cross country track team and a member of the State and All-American track teams. In the Penn Relays of 1957, his team won the Mile Relay with Quigg running the anchor leg.

== Career ==
After stints in the phone company and in the Army reserve, Quigg was hired as a development officer at Juniata College in Huntingdon, Pennsylvania in 1964. He was recruited to join the administration at the University of Richmond in 1969 at a critical time of its transition from a small, Southern Baptist-affiliated school to a modern university. Shortly after his hiring, E. Claiborne Robins Sr, an alumnus and trustee, donated $50 million to the university, at the time the largest gift from a private individual to an American school. Robins' gift consisted of $40 million in the form of common stock in the A.H. Robins Pharmaceutical Company and an additional $10 million earmarked as a challenge gift for matching funds to be raised by the university over the next ten-year period. Quigg, in partnership with then University President E. Bruce Heilman directed the successful matching effort, ultimately leading to a $60 million addition to the university’s endowment. To accomplish this feat, he organized one of the country's strongest university development offices. The methodology of capital campaigns, alumni tracking, and organizing resources to engage potential philanthropists were either developed or improved by Quigg and his colleagues. These techniques were gathered in his textbook "The Successful Capital Campaign: From Planning to Victory Celebration"

During his tenure, the University joined its separate undergraduate colleges for men and women into a single entity, built the Robins Center arena, founded the Jepson School of Leadership Studies and strengthened endowments for the University of Richmond School of Law and the E. Claiborne Robins School of Business.

A sample of his awards and recognition follow. In 1991 he was given the Nina Abady Award by the Virginia Association of Fundraising Executives. He was awarded the Executive of the Year Award by the Robins School of Business in 1990. In 1996 The Institute of Charitable Giving and Fundraising Magazine awarded Quigg the Major Gift Laureate Award. He was awarded the Lifetime Achievement in Philanthropy in 1999 by the Association of Fundraising Professionals. Other honors include The H. Gerald Quigg Conference Room of the library of the Chesapeake Academy (Irvington, VA. In 1997, a group of alumni and friends created the H. Gerald Quigg Endowment which funds speakers, the arts, and activities at the University of Richmond. Quigg himself endowed the H. Gerald Quigg Student Organization Prize (The Quigg Award) at the University of Richmond. The Quigg Conference room in the Jepson Center at the Jepson School of Leadership Studies was named in his honor.

Quigg was thrust onto the national stage when he was charged with the organization of the 1992 televised presidential debate among George H. W. Bush, Bill Clinton, and Ross Perot held at the Robins Center, University of Richmond on October 15, 1992. Quigg noted that one of the most difficult things was to accommodate the detailed wishes of all three candidates down to the height and upholstery of their stools on stage. The event served to bring the University wide national exposure

He retired in 1997 and started a consulting firm, Quigg and Associates, devoted to advising non-profits on the techniques of fund-raising.

== Personal life ==
He married in 1958 to Lorraine Olsen, a high school sweetheart. They raised three children. Until health issues curtained his activities, he was an avid runner and participated in regional races and masters level meets.
