= Governor's School for the Arts (Kentucky) =

Information
- Established: 1987; 39 years ago

The Kentucky Governor's School for the Arts (GSA) is a three-week summer program for rising juniors and seniors in the state of Kentucky originally established in 1987 by the Kentucky Center (now Kentucky Performing Arts), the Commonwealth of Kentucky, and numerous private supporters. In 2017, more than 1700 students auditioned for 256 student spots. In 2023, more than 500 students attended. By 2024, the program counted more than 8000 alumni, with graduates from every Kentucky county.

Since 2019, GSA has been located at the University of Kentucky in Lexington, KY. The program is free for students to attend. Nearly 30 universities across the commonwealth and outside Kentucky offer scholarships to GSA alumni. Selected applicants are divided into nine different art forms (which the program calls "disciplines"). Students may apply in two, but are only accepted for one. An average of about 28 students throughout the state are selected for each discipline, emphasizing the selectivity of the program's recruitment of prospective young artists. Attendance is free.

== Disciplines ==
- Architecture + design
- Creative writing
- Dance
- Drama
- Film & photography
- Instrumental music
- Musical theatre
- Visual arts
- Vocal music

== ArtShops ==
Each fall, ArtShops are offered in several locations across the state. Begun in 1997, these ArtShops typically take the form of masterclasses for each of the disciplines.

== See also ==
- Kentucky Governor's Scholars Program
