= William E. Cooper (university president) =

American academic administrator

President of the University of Richmond
- In office July 1, 1998 – June 30, 2007
- Preceded by: Richard L. Morrill
- Succeeded by: Edward L. Ayers

Personal details
- Education: Brown University (B.A., M.A.); Massachusetts Institute of Technology (Ph.D.)
- Profession: Educator

William E. Cooper is an educator and academic administrator who served as President of the University of Richmond from July 1, 1998, through June 30, 2007. He subsequently served as Distinguished University Professor and President Emeritus. Immediately prior to coming to the University of Richmond, Cooper served as Executive Vice President for the Main Campus at Georgetown University. He has also held faculty positions at Harvard University, the University of Iowa, and Tulane University, where he served as Dean of the Faculty of Liberal Arts and Sciences.

== Education ==
Cooper received his bachelor's and master's degrees (1973) from Brown University and his Ph.D. (1976) in Cognitive Studies from Massachusetts Institute of Technology.
