= E. Claiborne Robins =

Businessman and philanthropist (1910–1995)

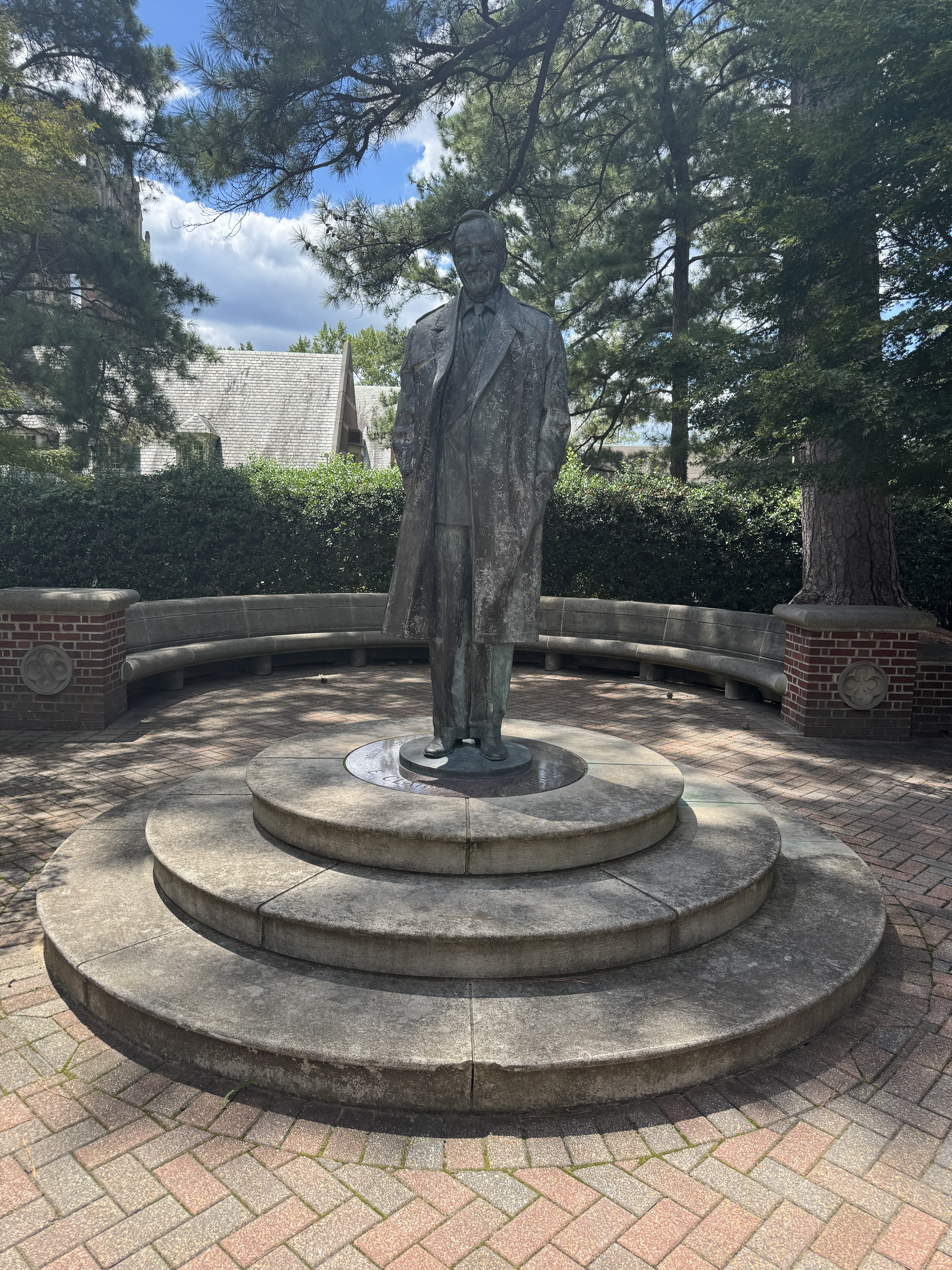
- Statue of Robins at the University of Richmond
- Born: Edwin Claiborne Robins; July 8, 1910; Richmond, Virginia, U.S.
- Died: July 6, 1995 (aged 84); Richmond, Virginia, U.S.
- Education: University of Richmond; Medical College of Virginia (PharmD)
- Occupations: Businessman; philanthropist
- Employer: A.H. Robins
- Known for: Chief executive of A.H. Robins; Major donations to University of Richmond

Edwin Claiborne Robins Sr. (July 8, 1910 – July 6, 1995) was chief executive of A.H. Robins pharmaceutical company and a philanthropist.

== Early life and education ==
Edwin Claiborne Robins was born July 8, 1910 in Richmond, Virginia.

He completed his undergraduate studies at the University of Richmond and earned a pharmacy degree from the Medical College of Virginia in 1933.

== Career ==
=== A.H. Robins ===
Robins' grandfather, Albert Hartley Robins, started a drug store in Richmond, Virginia in 1866. Robins joined the family business and expanded A.H. Robins into a Richmond-based multinational that produced products such as Robitussin cough syrup and ChapStick lip balm.

=== Dalkon Shield ===
The A.H. Robins company marketed the Dalkon Shield, a birth control device which seriously injured tens of thousands of women. Robins continued to sell Shields outside of the United States after the FDA asked they cease sales within the United States. E. Claiborne's testified at trial that the devices were pulled from the U.S. market because "it was the proper thing to do." The Robins company continued to sell Shields abroad for at least nine months after they were pulled from the U.S. market.

=== Philanthropy ===
Robins served as a trustee at the University of Richmond beginning in 1951. In 1969, when the university faced financial difficulty, he donated $50 million in company stock and $10 million in cash as a challenge grant—then the largest gift ever made to an American university.

The university's executives, headed by then-president E. Bruce Heilman and vice president H. Gerald Quigg, directed the successful effort, ultimately leading to a $60 million addition to the university's endowment.

His generous support is commemorated through named landmarks such as the Robins Center arena and the E. Claiborne Robins School of Business. Robins and his wife also made substantial contributions to the Medical College of Virginia, including nearly $3 million for a health professions building, and funded scholarships at Virginia Union University.

== Death ==
Robins died on July 6, 1995 at the age of 84.
