= Tiberius G. Jones =

American Baptist pastor and academic administrator (1821–1895)

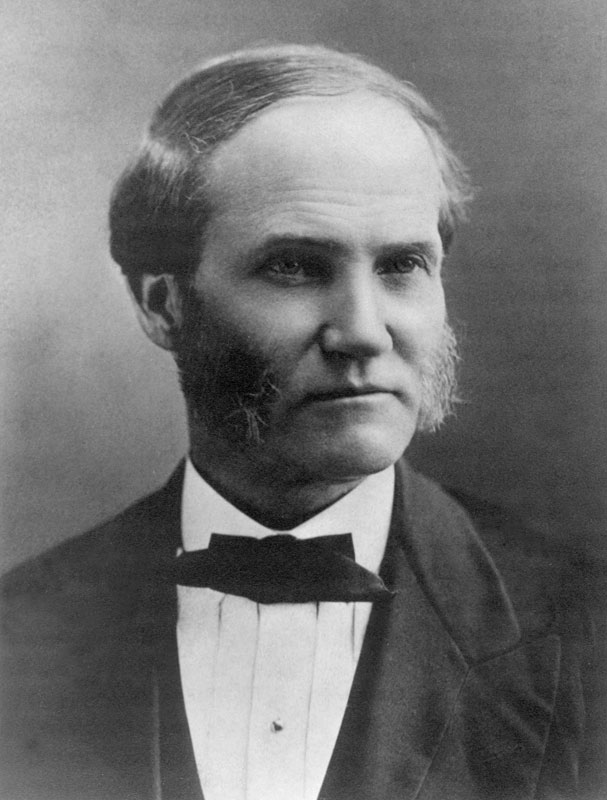
- Jones, prior to 1883

2nd President of Richmond College
- In office 1866–1869
- Preceded by: Robert Ryland
- Succeeded by: Frederic W. Boatwright in 1895

Personal details
- Born: July 21, 1821 Powhatan County, Virginia
- Died: June 27, 1895 (aged 73) Richmond, Virginia
- Spouses: Jane Chandler Reins (m. 1848; died 1867) Martha Ann Ridley (m. 1868)
- Education: College of William and Mary
- Profession: Pastor; educator

Tiberius Gracchus Jones (July 21, 1821 – June 27, 1895) was an American Baptist pastor and the president of Richmond College (now the University of Richmond) from 1866 to 1869.

== Early life and education ==
Jones was born on either July 12, 1819 or July 21, 1821 in Powhatan County, Virginia to Wood Jones and Elizabeth Trent Archer. Tiberius Gracchus Jones was named after the famed Roman statesman, Tiberius Gracchus, and was also the third cousin of speaker of the House of Representatives John Winston Jones. His siblings were similarly named after noted figures of antiquity such as Cincinnatus, Telemachus, and Ulysses.

Both of his parents died when Tiberius was around three and subsequently, he was raised by his mother's unmarried sister, Mary Ann Archer. When he reached the age of 18, he entered the Virginia Baptist Seminary, which would be renamed in the following years to Richmond College. Here he determined to go into the ministry and was thus licensed to preach by Rev. James B. Taylor of the Second Baptist Church of Richmond.

After his education at the seminary, he enrolled at the University of Virginia from 1842 to 1844 before completing his studies in 1845 at the College of William and Mary, where he was valedictorian of his graduating class.

== Career ==
Beginning in 1850, Jones served as the first minister of Freemason Street Baptist Church in Norfolk, Virginia. He left in the early 1860s due to the Civil War and took up the pastorate of the Franklin Square Baptist Church in Baltimore until the end of the war, upon which he returned to Norfolk. In 1866, he became the president of Richmond College but resigned in 1869 to return for the third time to Freemason in Norfolk. Afterwards, he became the pastor of the First Baptist Church in Nashville, Tennessee and later returned again to Norfolk to pastor the Cumberland Street Church, which was his last pastorate. He devoted the rest of his life to literary and theological studies. Richmond College, his former school, awarded him a Doctorate of Divinity in recognition of his work.

He delivered graduation addresses at Wake Forest College in 1854 and William and Mary in 1856.

== Death ==
He died on June 27, 1895, in Richmond, Virginia.

Academic offices
Preceded by Robert Ryland	President of Richmond College; 1866—1869	Vacant Faculty-run administration Title next held by Frederic W. Boatwright
