= North Court =

University dorm in Virginia, United States

- U.S. National Register of Historic Places
- Virginia Landmarks Register
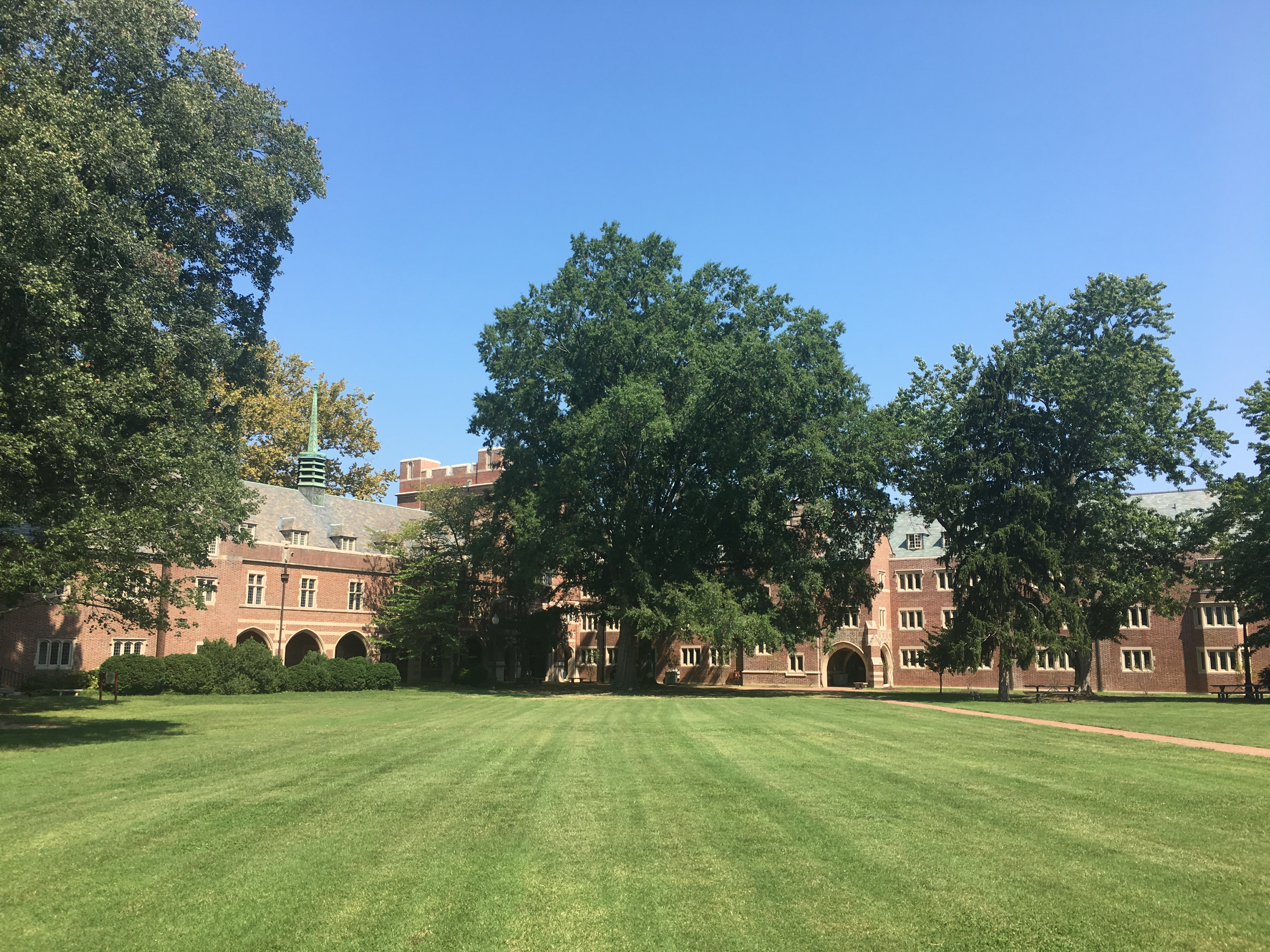

- Location within Virginia Location within the United States
- Location: 40 Westhampton Way, Richmond, Virginia
- Coordinates: 37°34′33″N 77°32′36″W
- Area: 1.928 acres (0.780 ha)
- Built: 1911
- Architect: Cram, Ralph Adams
- MPS: History and Architecture of the University of Richmond, 1834-1977
- NRHP reference No.: 13000260
- VLR No.: 127-0364-0003

Significant dates
- Added to NRHP: May 7, 2013
- Designated VLR: December 13, 2012

North Court is a historic dormitory building located on the University of Richmond campus in Richmond, Virginia. The building was originally built for Westhampton College, which together with Richmond College became the University of Richmond in 1920. It was designed by architect Ralph Adams Cram and built in 1911 in the Collegiate Gothic style. The three- to four-story building is constructed of brick, stone, and concrete and has a U-shaped plan with an encloses a courtyard with one open corner on the northwest end.

It was listed on the National Register of Historic Places in 2013.
