= Kevin Hallock =

American economist and academic administrator (born 1969)

11th President of the University of Richmond
- Incumbent
- Assumed office August 15, 2021
- Preceded by: Ronald Crutcher

Personal details
- Born: Kevin F. Hallock; March 10, 1969 (age 56) Palo Alto, California, U.S.
- Spouse: Tina Hallock (m. 1991)
- Children: 2
- Education: University of Massachusetts Amherst (BA); Princeton University (PhD)
- Profession: Educator; academic administrator; economist

Kevin F. Hallock (born March 10, 1969) is an American economist and academic administrator serving as president of the University of Richmond since 2021. Before coming to Richmond, he was the Dean of the SC Johnson College of Business at Cornell University from 2018 to 2021.

== Early life and education ==
Kevin Hallock was born on March 10, 1969, in Palo Alto, California but grew up in Hadley, Massachusetts. He graduated first in his class from Hopkins Academy in 1987, upon which he attended the University of Massachusetts at Amherst, where he was inducted into Phi Beta Kappa. Hallock graduated summa cum laude with a degree in economics in 1991 and subsequently received a Master of Arts in 1993 and a Ph.D. in 1995 from Princeton University.

== Career ==
Afterwards, Hallock took up a position as a professor of economics and of labor and industrial relations at the University of Illinois at Urbana-Champaign, where he stayed from 1995 to 2005. In 2005, he began teaching in the department of economics at Cornell University, serving as the Donald C. Opatrny ’74 Chair of the Department of Economics from 2012 to 2015, the Kenneth F. Kahn ’69 Dean of the School of Industrial and Labor Relations from 2015 to 2018, and the Dean of the SC Johnson College of Business from 2018 to 2021.

On March 4, 2021, the University of Richmond announced that its Board of Trustees had unanimously elected Hallock as the institution's 11th president.

== Personal life ==
Hallock and his wife, Tina, met when they were four years old and were married in 1991. They have two children.

Academic offices
Preceded by Ronald Crutcher	President of the University of Richmond; 2021–present	Incumbent
