= Samuel A. Banks =

American academic

Samuel Alston Banks
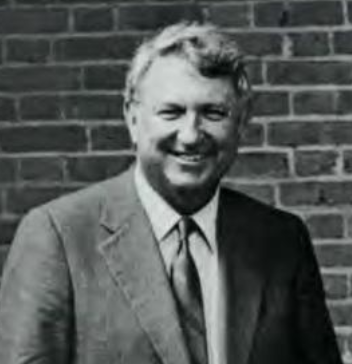

25th President of Dickinson College
- In office 1975–1986

6th President of University of Richmond
- In office 1986 – August 15, 1987

Personal details
- Born: May 16, 1928 Frostproof, Florida, United States
- Died: September 12, 2000 (aged 72) St. Petersburg, Florida, United States
- Spouse(s): Judith Anne Farabee, Joanne Trautman (née Belfiori)
- Occupation: Professor, theologist, pastor, academic administrator, university president

Samuel Alston Banks (May 16, 1928 – September 12, 2000) was an American professor, theologist, pastor, and academic administrator. He served as president of two American colleges and universities. He was ordained by the United Methodist Church. Banks had advocated in the early 1960s curricular changes to include human values in medical education.

== Early life and education ==
Banks was born May 16, 1928 in Frostproof, Florida. His father was a prominent citrus grower and fruit packer. He attended Lakeland Senior High School and Florida Southern College.

Banks received his bachelor's degree in English Literature from Duke University in 1949 and his Master of Divinity degree from Emory University in 1952. He received his Ph.D. in psychology and religion from the University of Chicago in 1971.

== Academic appointments ==
In his early career, Banks held faculty and administrative positions at Drew University and the University of Florida.

In 1975, he was named 25th president of Dickinson College, a position he held until 1986, when he became president of the University of Richmond. Banks spent only eight months at Richmond before resigning for health reasons. He then took faculty and administrative positions at Eckerd College, where he remained until his retirement in 1995.

He died from complications after a stroke on September 12, 2000 in St. Petersburg, Florida.

Academic offices
Preceded by E. Bruce Heilman	President of the University of Richmond; 1986—1987	Succeeded by E. Bruce Heilman
Preceded by Howard L. Rubendall	President of Dickinson College; 1979—1986	Succeeded by A. Lee Fritschler
