= A. Lee Fritschler =

American academic administrator (born 1937)

Assistant Secretary of Education for Postsecondary Education
- In office November 17, 1999 – 2001
- President: Bill Clinton
- Preceded by: David Longanecker
- Succeeded by: Sally L. Stroup

26th President of Dickinson College
- In office 1987 – June 30, 1999
- Preceded by: Samuel A. Banks
- Succeeded by: William Durden

Postal Rate Commission

Chairman & Commissioner
- In office July 31, 1979 – August 31, 1981
- President: Jimmy Carter
- Preceded by: Kieran O'Doherty
- Succeeded by: Henry R. Folsom

Personal details
- Born: May 5, 1937 (age 89) Schenectady, New York
- Spouse(s): Aliceann Wohlbruck (m. 1961; div. 1976) Susan Torrence (m. 1977)
- Children: 3
- Education: Union College (BS); Syracuse University (MPA, PhD)

Allen Lee Fritschler (born 1937) is an American higher education administrator who has held a wide range of positions throughout his career. He served as the President of Dickinson College, Assistant Secretary of Education for Postsecondary Education under President Clinton, and head director at the Brookings Institution's Center for Public Policy Education. He is an emeritus professor in the Schar School of Policy and Government at George Mason University

== Early life and education ==
Allen Lee Fritschler was born to of George A. and Jane E. (Green) Fritschler on May 5, 1937, in Schenectady, New York. He graduated from the Union College in 1959 with degrees in economics and political science. He received an MPA in 1960 and a PhD in public administration and political science from Syracuse University's Maxwell School of Citizenship and Public Affairs in 1965.

== Career ==
Fritschler began his career in 1964 as an assistant professor at American University in Washington, D.C. where he held several positions, including director of the public administration program, dean of the School of Governmental and Public Administration, and dean of the College of Public and International Affairs.

After publishing a book on the politics of regulation and the Federal Trade Commission's cigarette-labelling controversy, Fritschler was appointed as the chairman of the Postal Rate Commission by President Jimmy Carter, where he served from July 1979 to 1981.

After that, he was vice president and director of the Center for Public Policy Education at the Brookings Institution from September 1981 to 1987.

In 1999, Fritschler was nominated by President Bill Clinton as Assistant Secretary of Education for Postsecondary Education in the U.S. Department of Education. He was confirmed to the position and served from November 17, 1999, to 2001. As Assistant Secretary for Higher Education, the individual in question was responsible for determining the direction of policy for post-secondary education and overseeing the implementation of various programs administered by the department. These programs include, but are not limited to, financial aid for students, the Fulbright Program, graduate programs, support for Historically Black Colleges and Universities, and initiatives such as GEAR UP and TRIO which aim to increase access to higher education for underrepresented groups.

He spent 2002–2003 at the Brookings Institution as vice-president and director for the Center for Public Policy Education (CPPE).

He has been a professor at George Mason University since 2003. He has authored several books and numerous articles and a member of many boards and professional societies. He has also been a guest lecturer at numerous schools and executive programs.

=== Dickinson College president ===
In 1987, Fritschler was elected as the twenty-sixth president of Dickinson College in Carlisle, Pennsylvania. During his tenure, several campus improvements were made, including the construction of the Waidner addition to the Spahr Library and the Kline Fitness Center. He also helped to found the Annapolis Group, a coalition of 110 liberal arts college presidents working to build support for such schools. However, his tenure was marked by unexpected emergencies, including the sudden death of the college's treasurer and increasing deficits. He retired from Dickinson College on June 30, 1999.

=== Awards and honors ===
He is also an elected member of the National Council of the American Association of University Professors (AAUP), National Academy of Public Administration (NAPA) president of American Society for Public Administration (1982–83), amongst others.

He received an honorary doctorate from the Dickinson School of Law in 1993.

== Personal life ==
Fritschler is married to Susan, a career legislative affairs representative, and the couple has three children.
