= Robert Ryland =

American academic administrator (1805–1899)

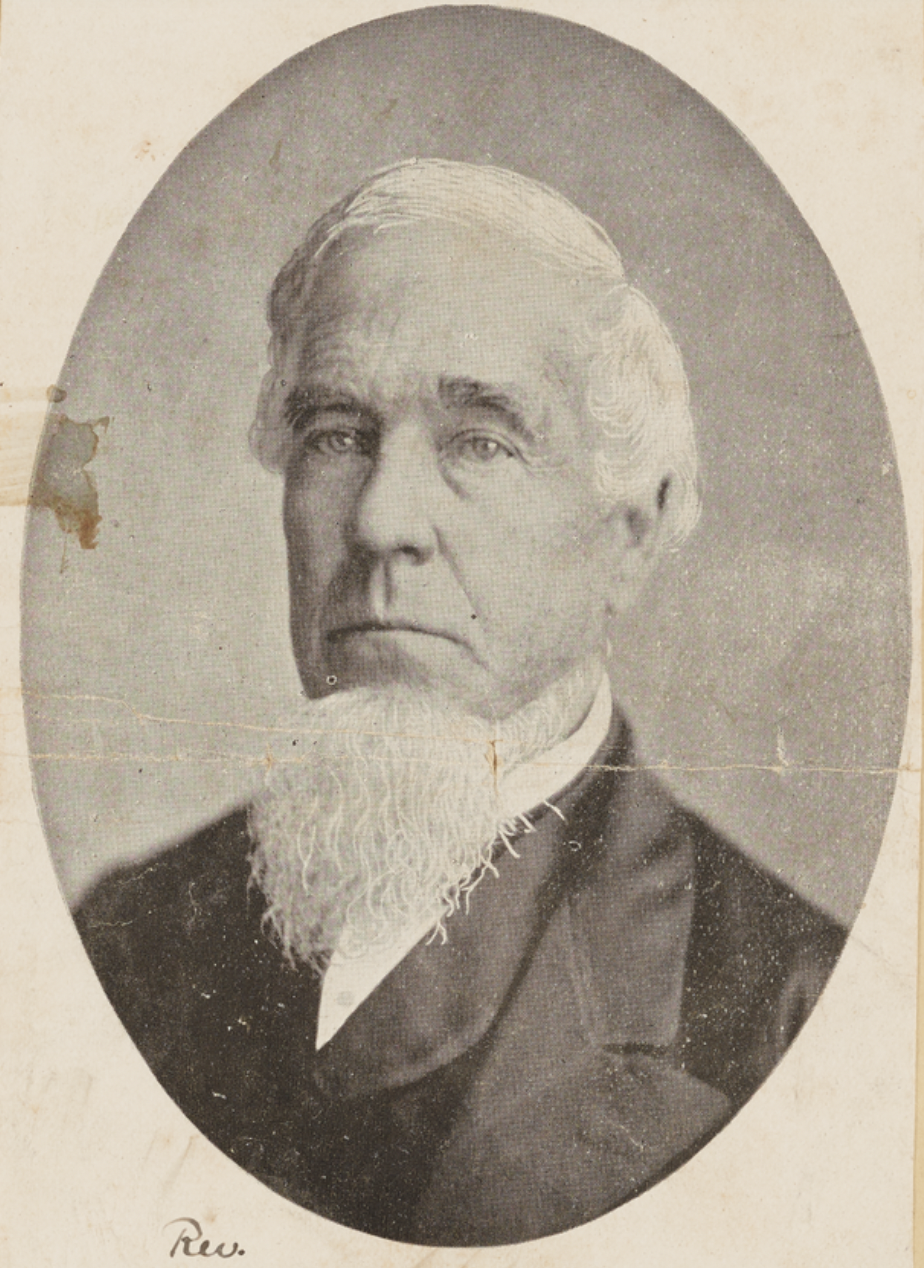
- Ryland, c. 1899

1st President of Richmond College
- In office 1840–1866
- Preceded by: Office established
- Succeeded by: Tiberius G. Jones

Personal details
- Born: March 14, 1805 Farmington Plantation, King and Queen County, Virginia
- Died: April 23, 1899 (aged 94) Lexington, Kentucky
- Spouses: Josephine Norvell (m. 1830; died 1846) Elizabeth P. "Betty" Thornton (m. 1848)
- Children: 7
- Education: Columbian College (BA), (MA)
- Profession: Educator; pastor

Robert Ryland (March 14, 1805 – April 23, 1899) was the first president of Richmond College (now the University of Richmond), serving from 1840 to 1866. Prior to the establishment of the college, he had served as the only superintendent of its predecessor institution, the Virginia Baptist Seminary, since 1832.

Ryland served as the first pastor for the First African Baptist Church of Richmond, Virginia from 1841 to 1865. The church is a prominent Black church founded in 1841, its members initially included both slaves and freedmen. It has since had a major influence on the local black community. At one point, it was one of the largest Protestant churches in the United States. Reverend Robert Ryland owned slaves himself and believed that slavery was the best way to convert Africans to Christianity.

Ryland Hall on the University of Richmond's campus was named in honor of both Robert Ryland and his nephew, Charles H. Ryland. The building was renamed in 2022 due to Ryland's support of slavery.

== Early life and education ==
Robert Ryland was born on March 14, 1805, at Farmington Plantation in King and Queen County, Virginia to Josiah and Catherine (née Peachy) Ryland. He had four brothers and two sisters.

Ryland received both BA (1826) and MA (1829) from Columbian College (now The George Washington University).

== Career ==
From 1841 to 1865, concurrent with his term as president of Richmond College, Ryland served as pastor of First African Baptist Church in Richmond. In 1868, Ryland became president of Shelbyville Female College in Shelbyville, Kentucky. He subsequently also served as president of female colleges in New Castle and Lexington, Kentucky. From 1893 until 1897, he served as chaplain of the Southwest Virginia Institute in Bristol, Virginia.

== Personal life ==
In 1830, he married Josephine Norvell, daughter of Thomas and Ann Mosby Norvell. They had two sons and two daughters before Josephine died in 1846. Robert remarried in 1848 to Elizabeth Presley "Betty" Thornton (daughter of Anthony and Ann Thornton), with whom he had three daughters.

== Death ==
He died on April 23, 1899, in Lexington, Kentucky.

Academic offices
New title	President of Richmond College; 1840—1866	Succeeded by Tiberius G. Jones
