= George M. Modlin =

American academic administrator (1903–1998)

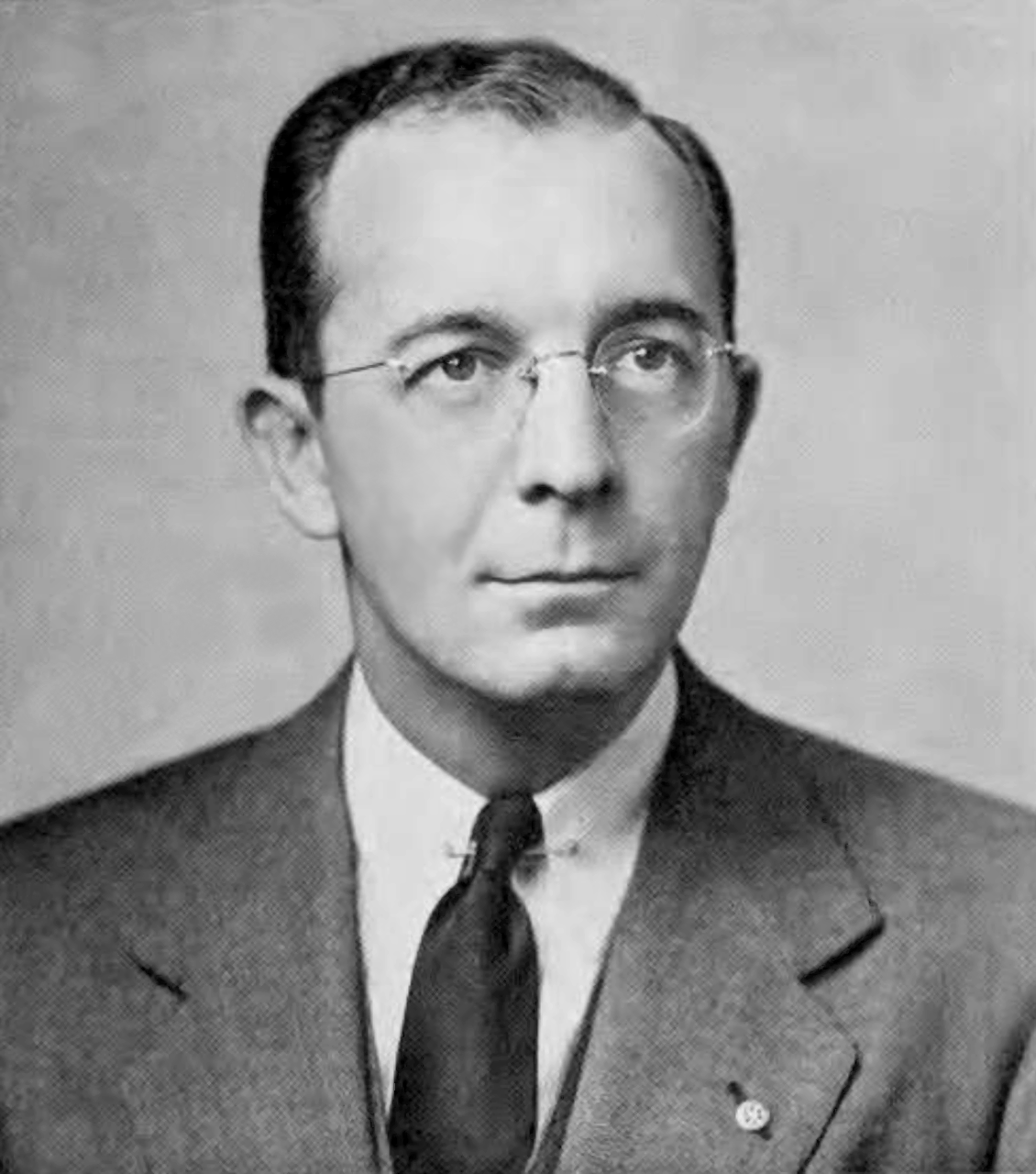
- Modlin c. 1951

President of the University of Richmond
- In office 1946–1971
- Preceded by: Frederic W. Boatwright
- Succeeded by: E. Bruce Heilman

Personal details
- Born: George Matthews Modlin; July 13, 1903 Elizabeth City, North Carolina, U.S.
- Died: October 4, 1998 (aged 95) Richmond, Virginia, U.S.
- Education: Wake Forest University (BA); Princeton University (MA), (PhD)

George Matthews Modlin (July 13, 1903 – October 4, 1998) was president of the University of Richmond from 1946 to 1971. He then served as the university's chancellor until 1986 and as chancellor emeritus until his death in 1998.

The George M. Modlin Fine Arts Building at the University of Richmond, opened in 1968, was named in his honor upon his retirement in 1971. In 1994, the building was renamed the Booker Hall of Music as the University prepared to expand the fine arts complex. The entire project, opened in 1996, then became known as the George M. Modlin Center for the Arts.

== Early life and education ==
Modlin was born on July 13, 1903 in Elizabeth City, North Carolina.

He received his Bachelor of Arts degree in history from Wake Forest University in 1924 and his Master of Arts (1925) and Ph.D. (1932) in economics from Princeton University.

== Career ==
In his early career, Modlin taught economics at Princeton and at Rutgers University. In 1938, he became dean of the Evening School of Business Administration and chairman of the Department of Economics at the University of Richmond.

In 1946, he assumed the presidency of the University of Richmond and remained in that position until 1971.

== Death ==
He remained associated with the university as chancellor and chancellor emeritus until his death on October 4, 1998.

Academic offices
Preceded by Frederic W. Boatwright	President of the University of Richmond; 1946—1971	Succeeded by E. Bruce Heilman
