= Ronald Crutcher =

American musician public figure, and academic administrator (born 1947)

Ronald A. Crutcher

10th President of the University of Richmond
- In office July 1, 2015 – August 15, 2021
- Preceded by: Edward L. Ayers
- Succeeded by: Kevin Hallock

Personal details
- Born: Ronald Andrew Crutcher; February 27, 1947 (age 79) Cincinnati, Ohio, U.S.
- Spouse: Betty Neal Crutcher
- Children: 1
- Education: Miami University (BMus); Yale University (MMus), (DMus)
- Occupation: Educator; musician

Ronald Andrew Crutcher (born February 27, 1947) is an American classical musician and academic administrator. He served as president of Wheaton College from 2004 to 2014, and as professor of music and 10th president of the University of Richmond from 2015 to 2021. He is currently a senior fellow at the Aspen Institute's College Excellence Program.

== Early life and education ==
Crutcher was born in Cincinnati, Ohio in 1947. He began learning the cello at the age of fifteen under the tutelage of Professor Elizabeth Potteiger at Miami University.

Crutcher is a Phi Beta Kappa graduate of Miami University. He pursued graduate studies at Yale University, during which he received support as a fellow of Woodrow Wilson, the Ford Foundation, and the Fulbright Program. In 1979, he became the first cellist to receive the Doctor of Musical Arts degree from Yale. After becoming fluent in German, he continued his education at the University of Bonn.

== Career ==
Crutcher was associate vice chancellor of Academic Affairs at the University of North Carolina at Greensboro from 1987 to 1990. He then became vice president of Academic Affairs at the Cleveland Institute of Music from 1990 to 1994. From 1994 to 1999, he served as director of the School of Music at the University of Texas at Austin.

At Miami University in Oxford, Ohio, Crutcher served as provost, executive vice president of Academic Affairs, and music professor. He also coordinated the "First in 2009" strategic process, and established the Center for American and World Cultures.

From 2004 to 2014, Crutcher served as president of Wheaton College. During his presidency, Wheaton College raised $137.6 million through a fundraising campaign, including $37 million for the Mars Center and $53.3 million for scholarships. Additional funds were allocated to students' and researcher's' resources, as well as athletic facilities. The campaign recorded a 72% rate of alumni participation.

In 2015, Crutcher was named the 10th president of the University of Richmond, succeeding Edward L. Ayers. In March 2021, the university announced that Crutcher would step down as president on August 15. He was succeeded by Kevin Hallock, then-dean of the Cornell SC Johnson College of Business.

Crutcher is also the founding co-chair of the Liberal Education and America's Promise (LEAP) initiative, housed in the Association of American Colleges and Universities (AAC&U).

In 2024, Crutcher was elected Vice President of Phi Beta Kappa.

Academic offices
Preceded by Edward L. Ayers	President of the University of Richmond; 2015–2021	Succeeded by Kevin Hallock
