= Frederic W. Boatwright =

American academic administrator (1868–1951)

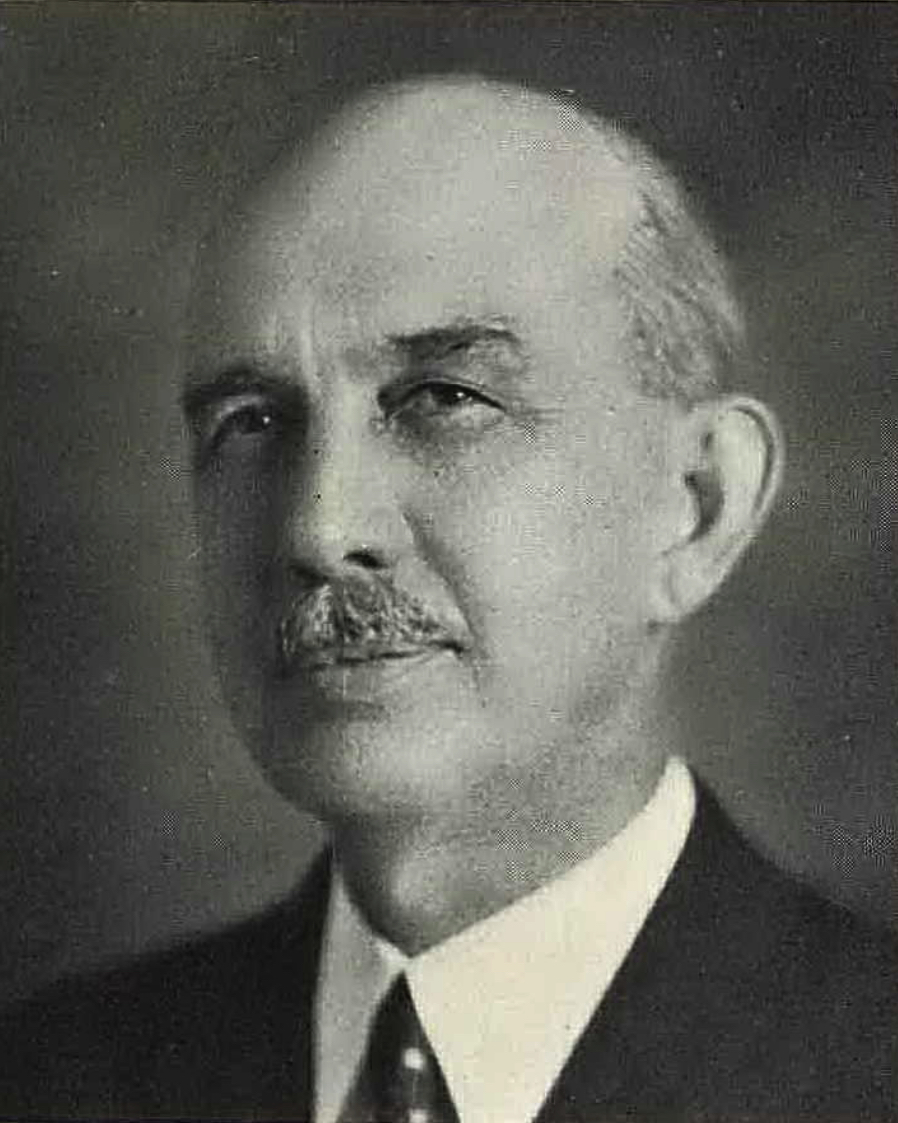
- Boatwright, c. 1938

President of the University of Richmond
- In office 1895–1946
- Preceded by: Tiberius G. Jones
- Succeeded by: George M. Modlin

Personal details
- Born: Frederic William Boatwright; January 28, 1868 White Sulphur Springs, West Virginia, U.S.
- Died: October 31, 1951 (aged 83) Richmond, Virginia, U.S.
- Resting place: Hollywood Cemetery
- Spouse: Ellen Moore Thomas (m. 1890)
- Education: Richmond College (MA); University of Halle; University of Paris; University of Leipzig

Frederic William Boatwright (January 28, 1868 – October 31, 1951) was president of Richmond College, now the University of Richmond, from 1895 to 1946.

== Early life and education ==
Born in White Sulphur Springs, West Virginia, Boatwright entered Richmond College in 1883 at the age of 15. He graduated with a Master of Arts degree in 1888 and pursued graduate study at the University of Halle, Sorbonne, and the University of Leipzig.

== Career ==
Elected president of Richmond College in 1895 at the age of twenty-seven, Boatwright led the university for 51 years, one of the longest terms of service of any college president.

In 1914, under Dr. Boatwright's leadership, the College moved from the Fan district of downtown Richmond to its current West End campus.

== Personal life ==
He married Ellen Moore Thomas on December 23, 1890.

== Death and legacy ==
Boatwright was buried in Hollywood Cemetery in Richmond.

Boatwright Memorial Library, opened in 1955 on the school's campus, is named in his honor. Earl Hamner Jr., creator of the hit CBS-TV series The Waltons, attended Richmond College during Boatwright's tenure, and named the fictional Boatwright University where the character of John-Boy Walton attended college after him.

Academic offices
Vacant Faculty-run administration Title last held by Tiberius G. Jones	President of the University of Richmond; 1895—1946	Succeeded by George M. Modlin
