= E. Bruce Heilman =

American academic (1926–2019)

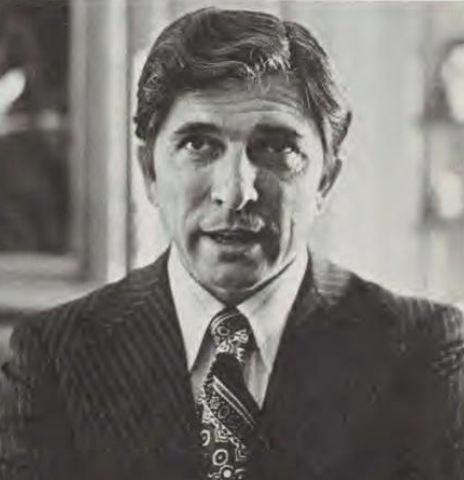
- Heilman c. 1973

5th President of the University of Richmond
- In office 1987–1988
- Preceded by: Samuel A. Banks
- Succeeded by: Richard L. Morrill
- In office 1971–1986
- Preceded by: George M. Modlin
- Succeeded by: Samuel A. Banks

President of Meredith College
- In office 1966–1971
- Preceded by: Carlyle Campbell
- Succeeded by: John E. Weems

Personal details
- Born: Earl Bruce Heilman; July 16, 1926 Smithfield, Kentucky
- Died: October 19, 2019 (aged 93)
- Spouse: Betty Dobbins (m. 1948)
- Children: 5
- Education: Peabody College (BA), (MA), (PhD)
- Occupation: Educator

Military service
- Allegiance: United States
- Branch/service: United States Marine Corps
- Battles/wars: World War II

Earl Bruce Heilman (July 16, 1926 – October 19, 2019) was an American academic who served as president of the University of Richmond and Meredith College. He last held the positions of chancellor at the University of Richmond and National Spokesman of The Greatest Generations Foundation.

== Early life and education ==
Heilman was born on July 16, 1926, in Smithfield, Kentucky. He received his Bachelor of Arts, Master of Arts, and Ph.D. from Peabody College, now a part of Vanderbilt University.

Heilman served in the United States Marine Corps during World War II.

He also attended Campbellsville Junior College, the University of Omaha, the University of Kentucky, and the University of Tennessee.

== Career ==
In his early career, Heilman held teaching positions at Belmont University, Kentucky Wesleyan College, and Peabody College. He also held administrative positions at Kentucky Wesleyan College, Georgetown College, Peabody College, and Kentucky Southern College (now a part of the University of Louisville). He served as president of Meredith College from 1966 to 1971. In 1971, he assumed the presidency of the University of Richmond, and remained in that position until 1986. He returned to the position on an interim basis in 1987–1988 after the unexpected resignation of his successor, Samuel A. Banks.

His tenure at the University of Richmond was notable for abetting the largest donation to a university. E. Claiborne Robins Sr, an alumnus and trustee, donated $50 million to the university, at the time the largest gift from a private individual to a US school. Robins' gift consisted of $40 million in the form of common stock in the A.H. Robins company and an additional $10 million earmarked as a challenge gift for matching funds to be raised by the university over the next ten-year period. In partnership with his vice president of development H. Gerald Quigg, Heilman directed the successful matching effort, ultimately leading to a $60 million addition to the university's endowment.

== Death ==
Heilman died on October 19, 2019, at age 93.

Academic offices
Preceded by Samuel A. Banks	President of the University of Richmond; 1987—1988	Succeeded by Richard L. Morrill
Preceded by George M. Modlin	President of the University of Richmond; 1971—1986	Succeeded by Samuel A. Banks
Preceded by Carlyle Campbell	President of Meredith College; 1966—1971	Succeeded by John E. Weems
