= Robins Center =

Building in Virginia, United States

- Dick Tarrant Court
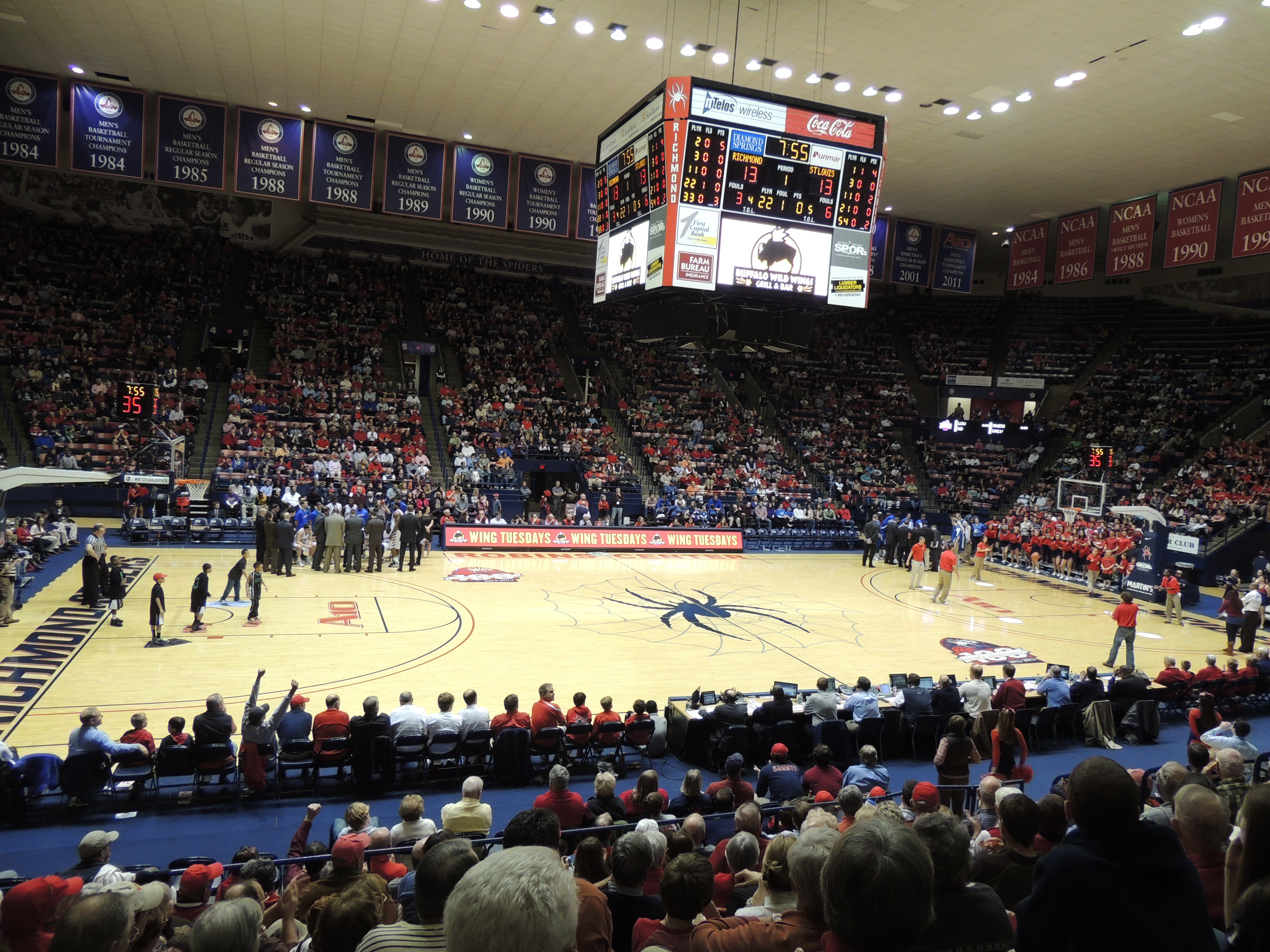
- The Robins Center before a basketball game in February, 2013
- Interactive map of Robins Center
- Location: University of Richmond; Richmond, VA 23173
- Coordinates: 37.580701°N 77.538987°W
- Owner: University of Richmond
- Operator: University of Richmond
- Capacity: 9,071 (1972–2013); 7,201 (2013–present)
- Surface: Maple (basketball court)

Construction
- Groundbreaking: 1970
- Opened: December 2, 1972
- Cost: $12 million ($92.4 million in 2025 dollars)
- Architects: Carneal and Johnston; Now Ballou Justice Upton; Richmond, VA

Tenants
- Richmond Spiders (men's & women's basketball); Richmond Rage (ABL) (1996-1997)

The Robins Center is a 7,201-seat multi-purpose arena in Richmond, Virginia. Opened in 1972, the arena is home to the University of Richmond Spiders basketball. It hosted the ECAC South (now known as the Colonial Athletic Association) men's basketball tournament in 1983. It is named for E. Claiborne Robins Sr, class of 1931, who, along with his family, have been leading benefactors for the school. The opening of the Robins Center returning Spider basketball to an on-campus facility for the first time since the mid-1940s when it outgrew Millhiser Gymnasium. In the intervening decades, the Spiders played home games in numerous locations around the Richmond area, including the Richmond Coliseum (1971–1972), the Richmond Arena (1954–1971), the Benedictine High School gymnasium (1951–1954), Grays' Armory (1950–1951) and Blues' Armory (1947–1950). The Robins Center arena serves as the location of the University of Richmond's commencement exercises and hosted a 1992 Presidential debate involving Bill Clinton, George H. W. Bush, and Ross Perot.

The Robins Center saw a number of upgrades in the 2000s, including a new maple floor in 2003 and renovated locker rooms and offices in 2004. A new scoreboard and sound system was installed for the 2006–2007 season. A $17 million renovation started in March 2013, which added four corner video boards, a repainted ceiling and new floor, and the seat capacity decreased from 9,071 to around 7,201 once renovations were completed in January 2014.

In 2015, the playing surface was renamed "Dick Tarrant Court" in honor of Dick Tarrant, the school's all-time winningest coach.

In addition to the basketball arena, the Robins Center also serves as the home of many of the other athletic programs at the University of Richmond. The Robins Center Natatorium serves as the home of the women's swimming and diving team, while most of the other programs have their coaches' offices in the building. An addition to the Robins Center, known as the Weinstein Center for Fitness and Recreation, opened in January 2007 and provides expanded facilities for recreational use.

== See also ==
- List of NCAA Division I basketball arenas

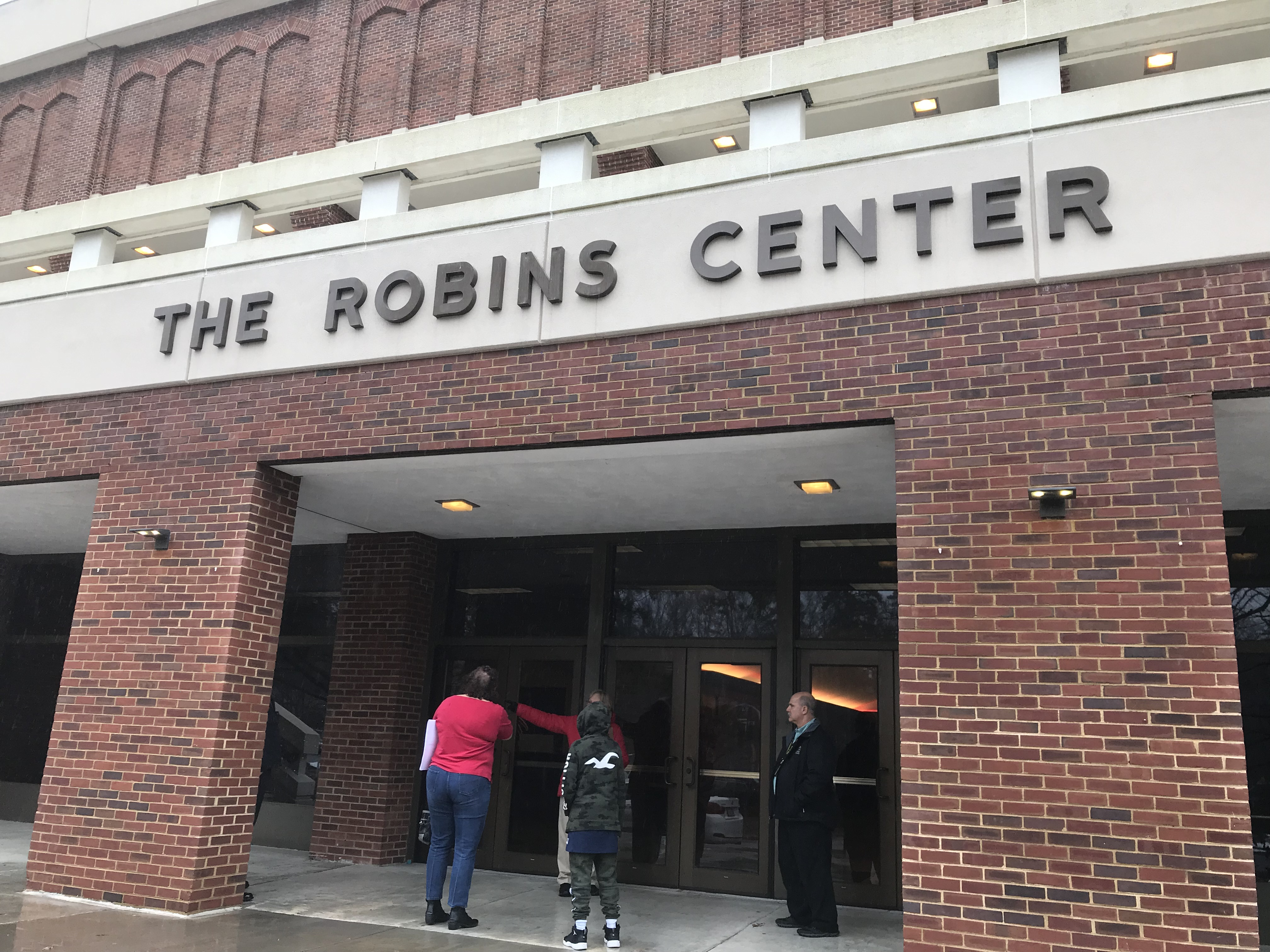
The lower level entrance to the Robins Center in December 2018.
