= Kentucky Governor's Scholars Program =

American high school academic program

The Kentucky Governor's Scholars Program (GSP) is a program to attempt to keep "the brightest" rising high school seniors inside the state of Kentucky. The program is a five-week program over the summer for students between their junior and senior years of high school. It is held at three different colleges across the commonwealth of Kentucky every year.

The program is highly competitive with about a 50% acceptance rate. In order to get accepted, prospective scholars must have high academic achievement, including standardized test scores, and be active in the community. The application prompts students to list their academic, extracurricular, and volunteer achievements. In addition, students must write an essay to be accepted into the program. The program itself consists of various classes and other school activities. The 1,000 rising seniors that are selected yearly are eligible to receive scholarships to any in-state public university upon completing the program. This incentive is an effort to keep the most intelligent of the state inside Kentucky.

== Program ==
The Kentucky Governor's Scholars Program (GSP) was established in 1983 by Kentucky leaders to keep its "best and brightest" interested in furthering education and potentially starting a career in the Commonwealth instead of traveling out of the state to do so. It is a five-week summer program for rising high school seniors. Approximately 1,020 Kentucky students are selected yearly based on an application process detailing their academic achievement, extracurricular involvement, volunteerism, and personal integrity. Each student that is selected is eligible to receive scholarships to any Kentucky public university, as well as a handful of private institutions. For the duration of the program, located at three local college campuses chosen through a bidding process, scholars have the rare opportunity to experience college life while attending classes daily. The Governor's Scholars Program emphasizes wide-ranging representation of all Kentucky regions, ethnicities, and cultural backgrounds. Participating scholars are granted the opportunity to expand their horizons by forming close relationships with their peers representing all 120 counties in the commonwealth. Funding for the program is largely provided by private donations and state tax revenue. Teachers of these classes are selected through a rigorous process, including a detailed application and an intense interview. Other members of the faculty, commonly known as the "RAs," or resident advisers, compete for limited spots through a similar procedure.

Prior to 1983, the pilot program, started in 1972, was known as the High School Junior Summer Program, and was run as part of the Honors Program at the University of Kentucky. It was an 8-week-long program, held coincident with the 8 week long summer school session, during which time approximately 12 high school scholars could experience college life living in a college dormitory while also attending college classes. It included twice-weekly colloquium meetings featuring the 13 programmes of the Civilisation series by Kenneth Clark, and also included outdoor classes for discussion of the differences in the cultural backgrounds of the participating high school scholars from around the commonwealth. Scholars typically took two 3-hour college level courses in addition to the zero credit colloquium class, for a total of 6 credit hours of classes. Upon the completion of the summer term at the University of Kentucky, participants could elect either to enter as freshmen in their chosen field of study at the University of Kentucky, or to return to their high schools for their senior year. The majority of participants elected to return to their high school for their senior year, from which they typically then elected to return to the University of Kentucky on a scholarship rather than attending universities outside the commonwealth, upon graduation from high school. Students in this pilot program were not required to stay on campus during the period of the summer school session, but could elect to attend social events on and off campus, in and around Lexington, Kentucky.

== Application process ==
In order for a student to be eligible for nomination and selection, a student must meet these requirements:

1. Be in the 11th grade at a Kentucky public or private school at the time of selection and intend to return to a Kentucky school district for the next school term (Students skipping their senior year to enter college are not eligible)
2. Be a current resident of Kentucky
3. Have taken the ACT, PSAT, or SAT in the 9th, 10th or 11th grades.

To apply, students must fill out an application that is either provided by their school or located online. Before being accepted into the statewide program, students first participate in their school and/or district competition. If selected to represent their district, students will be eligible for the statewide selection process. Out of the 1,900 applications that make it to the statewide selection, ~1,020 scholars are chosen to take part in the Governor's Scholars Program.

=== Selection process ===
Once the applications are received in Frankfort for the state level competition, they are then divided into seven distinct sections. The first section, which contains all of the student's biographical information, is filed separately and tied to the rest of the sections only through the "journal number" that is used to identify each applicant. This allows each application to be read blindly, without any regard to the student's personal information, and insures fairness in the selection process. The remaining seven sections are divided among the members of the Statewide Selection Committee, a panel consisting of college admission personnel, college and high school teachers, and education leaders from different areas of the state. Each committee member reads and scores only one of the seven different sections.

The sections include:

- Academic Achievement (30 Points)
- Student Profile (30 Points – 10 Points per Subsection)
  - Extracurricular Activities
  - Community Service (Voluntary or Paid)
  - Honors and Awards
- Writing Entry – 500 words (20 Points)
- High School Teacher Recommendations (10 Points)
- Community Leader Recommendations (10 Points)

== Residence ==
The Governor's Scholars Program accepts ~1,020 students from all 120 counties in the Commonwealth of Kentucky. The scholars are divided among the three host Kentucky college campuses and experience dorm life on their given campuses. Among the schools to host, some in past years and the present include, Northern Kentucky University, Eastern Kentucky University, Centre College, Western Kentucky University, Morehead State University, Bellarmine University, Murray State University, and the University of Kentucky. GSP students are required to stay on their given campus for the duration of the program, except for group field trips and service work.

== Curriculum ==
Scholars attend a selection of three classes during the week: Focus Area, General Studies, and Leadership Seminar. Focus Area is a topic within the arts and sciences, assigned based on the scholar's preference. General Studies classes are assigned randomly and could be any topic of the teacher's choice. Leadership Seminar is a discussion class in which scholars explore their personal leadership styles and increase team collaboration skills.

While most teachers refrain from assigning outside work, classes challenge the scholars' modes of thinking in a variety of arenas. GSP teachers take a creative approach to most subjects, allowing the scholars to contribute with their own interactive and experimental projects. Regular field trips, ranging from the Little Sandy Correctional Complex to the Cincinnati Opera, enhance the GSP experience.

=== Focus areas ===
Focus areas include:

- Agribusiness and Biotechnology
- Architectural Design
- Astronomy
- Biological and Environmental Issues
- Business, Accounting, and Entrepreneurship
- Chinese Language and Culture
- Communication and Social Theory
- Creative Writing and Literary Studies
- Cultural Anthropology
- Dramatic Expression
- Engineering
- Film Studies
- Forensic Science
- Healthcare Industry
- Historical Analysis
- International Relations
- Japanese Language and Culture
- Journalism and Mass Media
- Modes of Mathematical Thinking
- Musical Theory and Performance
- Philosophy
- Physical Science (Chemistry, Geology, Physics)
- Political and Legal Issues
- Psychology and Behavioral Studies
- Public Policy and Administration
- Spanish Language and Culture

== Special activities ==
GSP provides students many opportunities to participate in various activities throughout the course of the program. The program hosts guest speaker convocations and leadership colloquiums, ACT prep, GSP Olympics, Community Arts Day, International Fair, Blood Drives and Community Service Day, as well as weekly showcases where students can perform talent and entertainment acts. The students also have opportunities to participate in weekly dances, Classic Film Series viewings, and a Fourth of July Parade. Scholars who wish to continue their religious practices are able to attend a variety of local churches each Sunday, as well as attend bible studies on campus. Additionally, the program encourages scholars to form and publicize their own student-led events and clubs which can meet during free time throughout the day.

== Scholarships ==
Because of the rigorous application process and educational purpose, alumni have access to a multitude of scholarships due to their involvement in the program.

Scholarships are offered from the following Kentucky colleges to students who have completed the program:

- Asbury University
- Bellarmine University
- Berea College
- Campbellsville University
- Centre College
- Eastern Kentucky University
- Georgetown College
- Kentucky Christian University
- Kentucky State University
- Kentucky Wesleyan College
- Lindsey Wilson College
- Midway University
- Murray State University
- Northern Kentucky University
- University of Pikeville
- Thomas More College
- Transylvania University
- Union College
- University of the Cumberlands
- University of Kentucky
- University of Louisville
- Western Kentucky University

Scholars typically receive thousands of dollars in scholarship money. The following data represents survey responses from 2010 Governor's Scholars who graduated high school in 2011:

- Total number of 2010 scholars: 1,051
- Total number of survey responses: 577 or 55%
- These 577 scholars received in total scholarships: $35,815,686
- Average scholarship (per scholar): $62,072.25
- 470 (81%) scholars are attending Kentucky colleges or universities
- Total in-state scholarships: $28,436,550
- Average in-state scholarship (per scholar): $60,503.30
- 107 (19%) scholars are attending out-of-state colleges or universities
- Total out-of-state scholarships: $7,379,136
- Average out-of-state scholarship (per scholar): $68,963.88
