= University of Richmond =

Private college in Richmond, Virginia, US

- Former name: Dunlora Academy (1830–1832) Virginia Baptist Seminary (1832–1840) Richmond College (1840–1920)
- Motto: Verbum Vitae et Lumen Scientiae (Latin)
- Motto in English: Word of life and light of knowledge
- Type: Private liberal arts college
- Established: 1830; 196 years ago
- Academic affiliations: Annapolis Group; ACS; CIC
- Endowment: $3.49 billion (2025)
- President: Kevin Hallock
- Students: 3,914 (spring 2021)
- Undergraduates: 3,202 (spring 2021)
- Postgraduates: 712 (spring 2021)
- Location: Richmond, Virginia, U.S. 37°34′39″N 77°32′16″W
- Campus: 350 acres (140 ha); Suburban
- Colors: Blue and red
- Nickname: Spiders
- Sporting affiliations: NCAA Division I – A-10
- Mascot: WebstUR the Spider
- Website: www.richmond.edu

The University of Richmond (UR or U of R) is a private liberal arts college in Richmond, Virginia, United States. It is a primarily undergraduate, residential institution with approximately 3,700 undergraduate and graduate students in five schools: the School of Arts and Sciences; the E. Claiborne Robins School of Business; the Jepson School of Leadership Studies; the University of Richmond School of Law; and the School of Professional & Continuing Studies. It is classified among "Baccalaureate Colleges: Arts & Sciences Focus".

The university's athletics teams are known as the "Richmond Spiders," after the university's distinctive mascot. A participant in the U.S. Navy's V-12 Navy College Training Program during World War II, Richmond commissions U.S. Army officers through its ROTC program, which is partnered with Hampden-Sydney College and Longwood University in Farmville, Virginia.

== History ==
The University of Richmond traces its history to a meeting of the Baptist General Association of Virginia held on June 8, 1830. The BGAV resolved "that the Baptists of this State form an education society for the improvement of the ministry." Thus, the Virginia Baptist Education Society was instituted. However, the society did not have enough funds for a proper school yet. In the meantime, they asked their vice-president, Rev. Edward Baptist, "to accept into his home young men wishing to prepare for the ministry." Baptist was an 1813 graduate of Hampden–Sydney College. In August 1830, William Allgood, the first student of this ministry school, came to Baptist's Dunlora Plantation to attend classes in "a building of three or four rooms." The school, eventually known as Dunlora Academy, enrolled nine students in its first year. After two years, the society purchased for $4,000 "Spring Farm," located about five miles north of Richmond. This farm was the home of the Virginia Baptist Seminary which opened July 1, 1832, and began classes July 4 under the leadership of Robert Ryland.

The Virginia Baptist Seminary offered courses in Latin, Greek, and mathematics. Each day, students worked for three hours at farm labor. President Ryland thought highly of this system as it was "improving the health, diminishing the expenses, and perhaps guarding the humility of the young preachers." In reality, the farming experiment proved to be unprofitable and was dropped from the school after a couple of years. Over time, enrollment and faculty increased to a point where the education society began looking for a more suitable property than the small "Spring Farm," where dorms consisted of log cabins while the schoolrooms and the chapel were in a barn.

In 1834, the Virginia Baptist Education Society bought the former Haxall family plantation. This property was much larger and more efficient than "Spring Farm." It was situated in the main house, Columbia, and other brick buildings. As the seminary grew, it became in need of funds. The education society was unable to receive bequests or hold property as it was an unincorporated organization. The seminary could not receive a charter from the legislature as it was a theological school. Therefore, around 1840 the seminary applied for a charter as a liberal arts college, which was granted on March 4 of that year. At this time, the society turned over the land and buildings of the school to the trustees of the newly minted Richmond College.

Richmond College officially opened on January 2, 1843. It had "68 students, 3 teachers, land and buildings valued at $20,000, a small endowment, and a library of 700 volumes". For an eleven-month session, tuition and room and board cost $120. The salaries of the teachers were $900 for President Ryland, and $600 and $500 for the other two.

During the American Civil War, the entire student body formed a regiment and joined the Confederate army. Richmond College's buildings were used as a hospital for Confederate troops and later as a barracks for Union soldiers. The college invested all of its funds in Confederate war bonds, and the outcome of the war left it bankrupt. In 1866, James Thomas donated $5,000 to reopen the college. The T.C. Williams School of Law opened in 1870.

In 1894, the college elected Frederic W. Boatwright president. President Boatwright would serve for 51 years. He is most remembered for raising the funds needed to move the college in 1914 from its original uptown location to a new 350-acre campus in what is now Westhampton area of Richmond, and in doing so created Westhampton College for women.

Westhampton College opened with 82 students on September 17, 1914, as Richmond Women's College. Its first dean was May Keller, with Boatwright serving as treasurer. The college was housed in the Richmond Women's College Building, built between July 1911 and 1913. Shortly afterward, the building was renamed Westhampton College. In 1948, the building received its current name of North Court. The building was divided into an academic wing and living space for the students and faculty. In addition, the female students had access to the library and science buildings of Richmond College.

The institution's main library, Boatwright Memorial Library, is named in Boatwright's honor. Symbolically, the library and its soaring academic gothic tower occupy the highest spot on the grounds. Its grounds were landscaped in 1913, by Warren H. Manning under the supervision of Charles Gillette.

The institution was renamed the University of Richmond On September 21, 1920. This established a corporation that combined the renamed Richmond College for Men and Westhampton College. The respective parts of the campus continue to be referred to as the Westhampton and the Richmond "sides". “

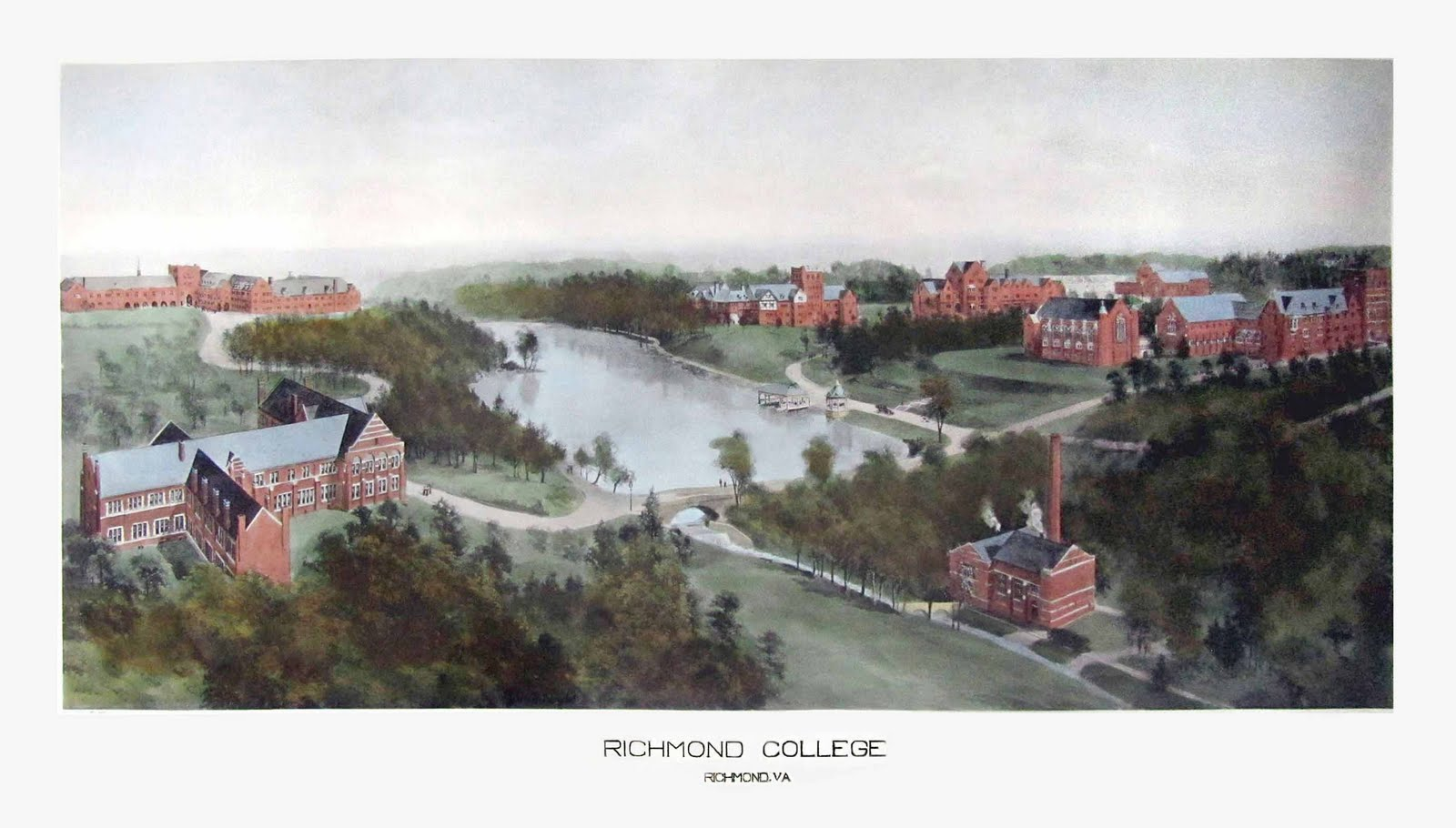
The campus of Richmond College in 1915, shortly after the transition to Richmond's West End.

In 1949, the E. Claiborne Robins School of Business opened, followed by the School of Continuing Studies in 1962. In 1969, when financial issues threatened closing the institution or turning it over to the Commonwealth of Virginia, E. Claiborne Robins Sr., a trustee and alumnus, donated $50 million to the institution, the largest gift made to an institution of higher education at the time. In constant dollars, it remains among the largest. Robins' goal was to make Richmond one of the best private universities in the country. In partnership with the institution's president E. Bruce Heilman and development director H. Gerald Quigg the $10 million matching grant component of the gift raised over an additional $60 million, making the institution's total endowment at the time one of the highest in the country.

During World War II, Richmond was one of 131 colleges and universities nationally that took part in the V-12 Navy College Training Program which offered students a path to a Navy commission.

In 1987, a donation of $20 million by Robert S. Jepson Jr. facilitated the opening of the Jepson School of Leadership Studies.

On October 15, 1992, presidential candidates George H. W. Bush, Bill Clinton, and Ross Perot came to campus for the first-ever "town hall" televised presidential debate, viewed by 200 million people worldwide. Addressing a crowd of nearly 9,000, President Obama visited the University of Richmond to present the American Jobs Act on September 11, 2011.

On, February 23, 2015, the University of Richmond announced to the student body via email that the board of trustees elected Ronald Crutcher as the tenth president of the institution. He took office on July 1, 2015, and his inauguration ceremony was held at the Robins Center on October 30, 2015, becoming the first African American president of the institution.

In August 2021, Kevin F. Hallock became the 11th president of the institution. Hallock, a labor economist, previously served as the Dean of the SC Johnson College of Business at Cornell University.

The Henry Mansfield Cannon Memorial Chapel, North Court, and Ryland Hall were listed on the National Register of Historic Places in 2013.

== Schools ==
=== School of Arts & Sciences ===
All Richmond undergraduate students begin their coursework in the School of Arts & Sciences (A&S), which offers 38 majors and 10 concentrations in the arts, sciences, social sciences, and humanities. The School of Arts & Sciences has 22 departments and 10 interdisciplinary programs. After one full year of study, students may decide to pursue majors in other undergraduate schools, though 70 percent of students choose to remain in A&S.

=== Robins School of Business ===
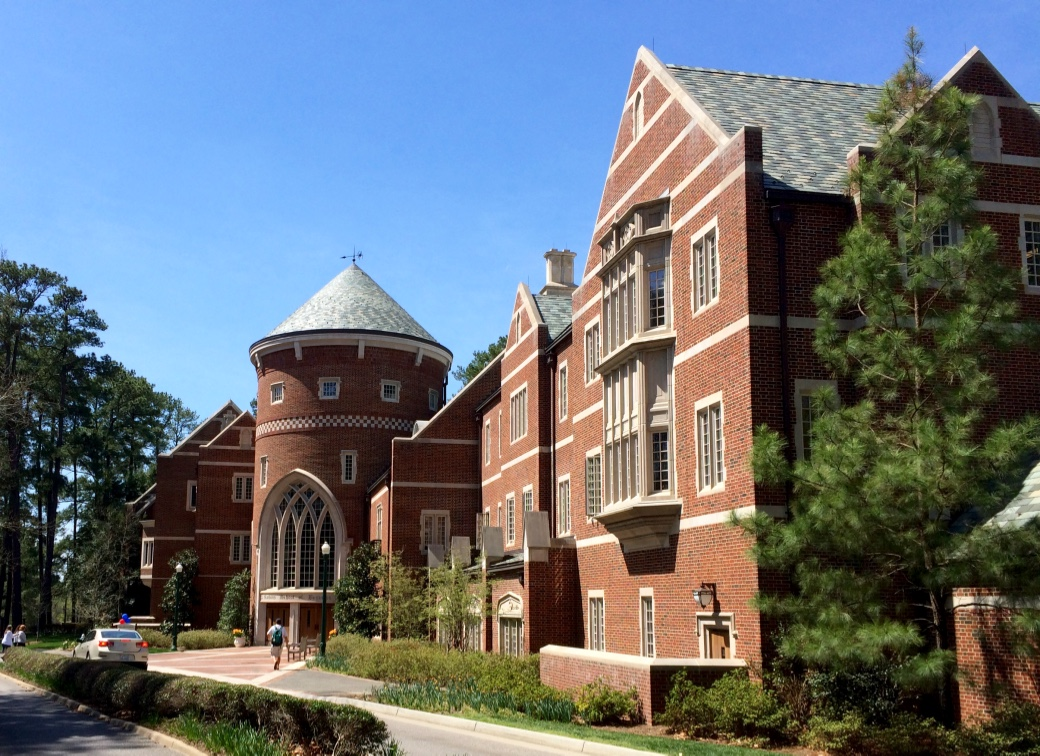
E. Claiborne Robins School of Business

The Robins School of Business was established in 1949 and offers undergraduate, graduate, and executive education programs. It is named after alumnus E. Claiborne Robins.

=== Jepson School of Leadership Studies ===
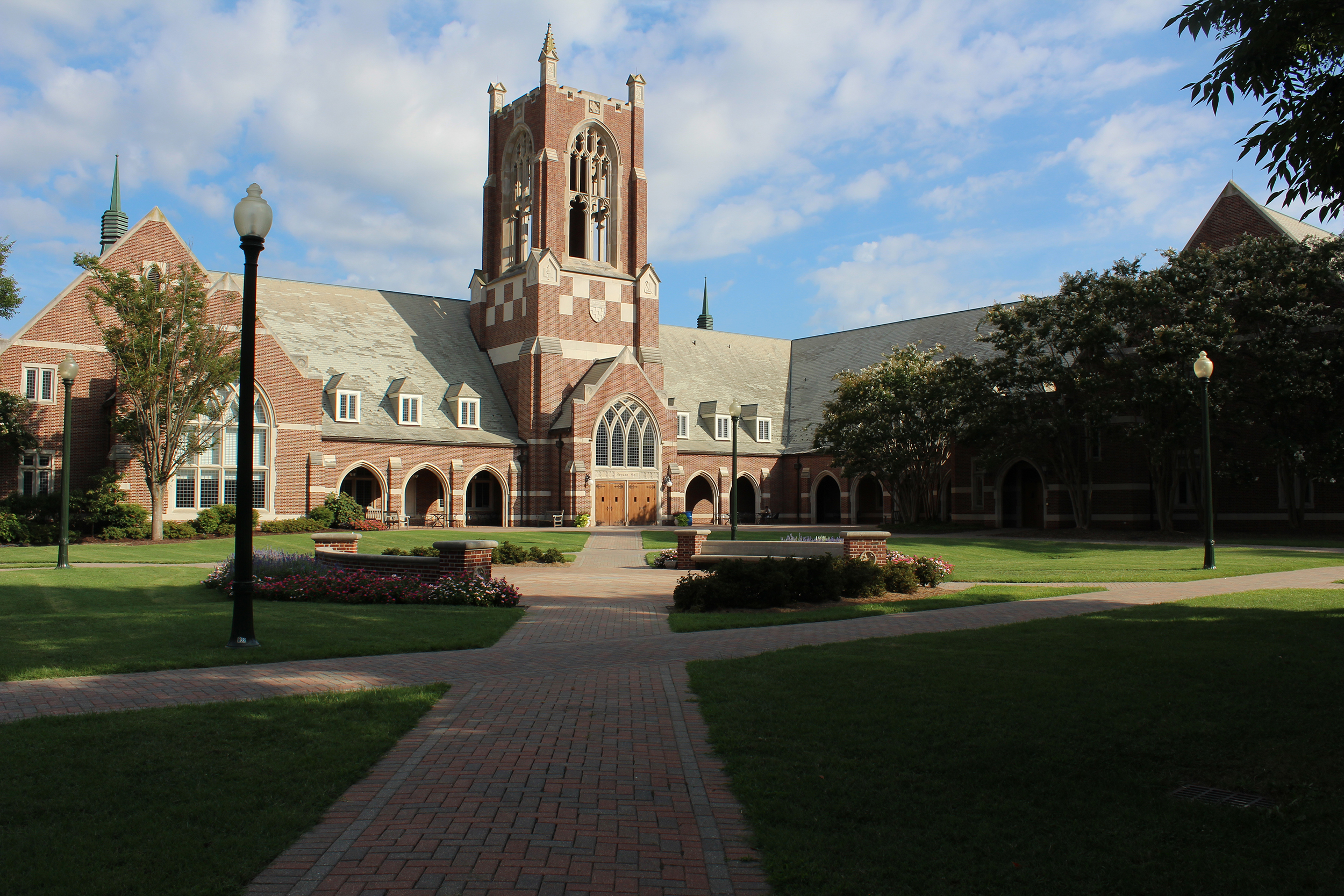
Jepson School of Leadership Studies, Jepson Hall

The Jepson School of Leadership Studies was founded to address a perceived need in the modern world for the academic study of leadership. The school blends a curriculum of economics, history, literature, philosophy, politics, psychology, and religion so that students can learn conceptual tools that support the exercise of leadership in varied settings. As of 2016, the Jepson School remains the only school of its kind in the United States that is completely devoted to the study of leadership.

=== School of Professional and Continuing Studies ===
The School of Professional & Continuing Studies was established in 1962. It offers degree and certificate programs, enrichment opportunities, professional training, and college course work for part-time and non-traditional students of all ages. A variety of evening programs with credit and non-credit courses make it possible for those with busy schedules to further their education or explore new interests.

The school was originally named University College and included both a two-year junior college and an evening division. It was located on the original location of Richmond College on the corner of Grace and Lombardy Streets in Richmond's Fan district. In 1974, the school moved from the Columbia Building at Grace & Lombardy to the main campus in Richmond's West End.

In 1994, the school was renamed the School of Continuing Studies in alignment with the names of the other schools of the institution. In 2012, it was renamed the School of Professional & Continuing Studies to better reflect the character of its students and the nature of its programs.

== Academics ==
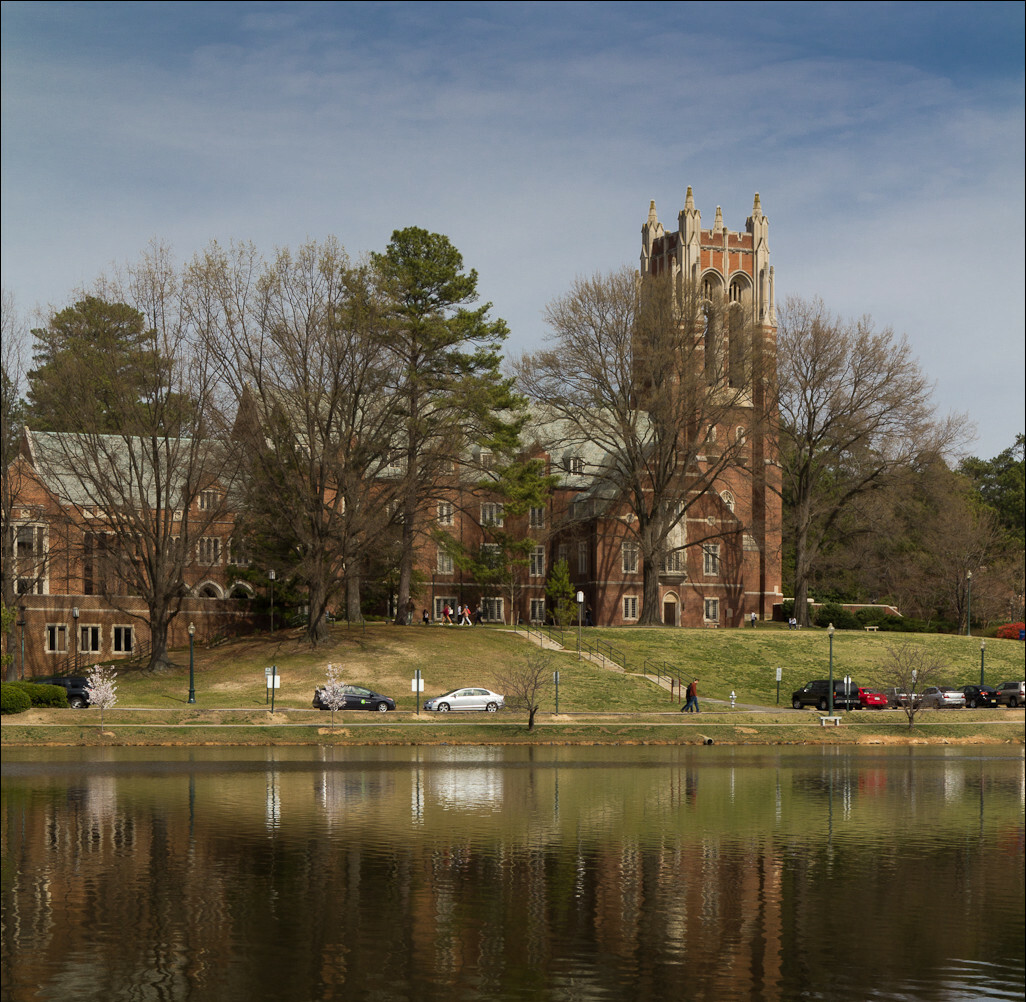
Boatwright Memorial Library viewed from across Westhampton Lake

All students must complete general education requirements as part of the liberal arts curriculum. These requirements include a first-year seminar that all first-year students must complete. Other general education requirements include expository writing, wellness, foreign language, and one class each in six fields of study.

Richmond offers more than 100 majors, minors, and concentrations in three undergraduate schools: the School of Arts and Sciences, the Robins School of Business, and the Jepson School of Leadership Studies. The School of Continuing Studies, primarily an evening school focused on part-time adult students, offers additional degree programs in selected areas.

=== Admissions ===
Undergraduate admissions statistics
- 2026 entering class
- Admit rate: 20.8%
- Yield rate: 22.8%

Test scores middle 50%
- SAT Total: 1450–1520
- ACT Composite: 33–35

High school GPA
- Average: 3.84–4.00

The University of Richmond admitted 20.8 percent of applicants for the class of 2030. The University of Richmond is among the 100 most selective colleges and universities in the United States. The 876-member class of 2030 has a middle 50 percent range for core unweighted GPA of 3.84–4.00, a middle 50 percent range for SAT scores of 1450–1520 and a middle 50 percent range for ACT scores of 33–35.

=== Reputation and rankings ===
Academic rankings

Liberal arts
- U.S. News & World Report: 21 (tie) of 206

National
- Forbes: 82 of 500

In its 2026 rankings, U.S. News & World Report ranked Richmond 21st out of 206 among national liberal arts colleges, 18th out of 167 among private liberal arts colleges, 6th out of 50 in "Most Innovative Schools", 41st out of 97 in "Best Value," 51st out of 75 in "Best Undergraduate Teaching," and 53rd out of 59 in "Best Undergraduate/Creative Projects".

In its 2024 edition of The Best 389 Colleges The Princeton Review named Richmond No. 30 of 50 in Top Green Colleges, No. 24 of 25 in "Their Students Love These Colleges", No. 19 of 25 in "Students Study the Most", No. 16 of 25 in Best Student Support and Counseling Services, No. 15 Best College Dorms, No. 15 of 25 in Professors Get High Marks, No. 14 of 25 in Best College Library, No. 11 of 25 in Best Campus Food, No. 11 of 25 in Best Career Services, No. 10 of 25 Happiest Students, No. 9 of 25 in Best Quality of Life, No. 7 of 25 in Best Science Lab Facilities, No. 7 of 25 in Best Athletic Facilities, No. 5 of 25 in Most Accessible Professors, No. 3 of 25 Best-Run College, No. 3 of 25 in Best Private Schools for Internships, No. 3 of 25 Best Classroom Experience, and No. 1 of 25 Most Beautiful Campus.

=== Financial aid ===
Richmond offers a need-blind admissions policy that does not consider an applicant's ability to pay in the admission decision and it pledges to meet 100 percent of an admitted domestic student's demonstrated need.

=== Student research ===
The University of Richmond offers numerous research opportunities for students. In addition to research-based courses, independent studies, and practicums in most disciplines, many special opportunities exist for students to participate in close research collaborations with faculty. Student research occurs in all academic areas, including the arts, sciences, social sciences, and other fields. In 2019, Richmond graduated the fourth most Fulbright Scholars out of American undergraduate institutions. The Richmond Guarantee is a fellowship available to all undergraduate students to facilitate summer internships or research projects.

== Student life ==
The Princeton Review ranked the University of Richmond #23 on a list of "Happiest Students" from a survey of students at 391 colleges.

=== Greek Life ===
Richmond has an active Greek life with 14 recognized national fraternities and sororities. As of 2025, 36 percent of the undergraduate student body participated in Greek life.

=== Traditions ===
Noted University of Richmond traditions include: an honor code administered by student honor councils; Investiture and Proclamation Night, ceremonies for first year men and women to reflect on their next four years; Ring Dance, a dance held at the Jefferson Hotel by the junior class women; and Pig Roast, a large annual event held during the spring semester which draws significant gatherings of current students and alumni to the fraternity lodges and have featured musical acts such as Flo Rida and Afroman. Another long-standing Richmond tradition is the crowning of the largest goose on Westhampton Lake with the title "Triceragoose." This establishes that goose as the king of the lake, ruling over all ducks, geese, and freshmen.

== Campus ==
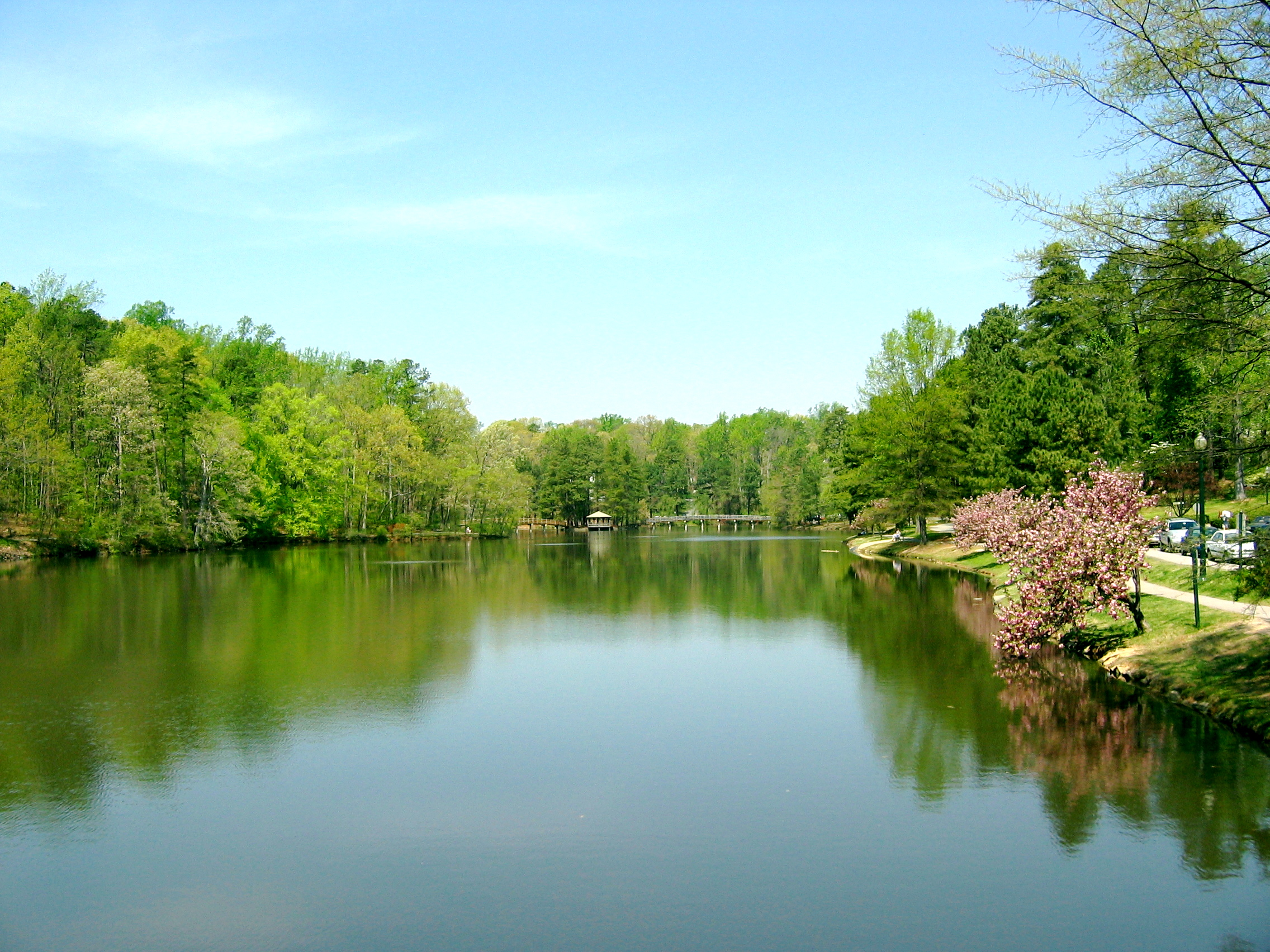
Looking out over Westhampton Lake from Tyler Haynes Commons

=== Main campus ===
The University of Richmond's campus consists of 350 acres (140 ha) in a suburban setting on the western edge of the city. Most of the campus lies within the city limits; a small section of the south campus, including the Special Programs Building (home to the campus police), intramural sports fields, and most of the campus apartments, lies within Henrico County.

The institution has, with few exceptions, remained true to the original architectural plans for the campus—red brick buildings in a collegiate gothic style set around shared open lawns. Many of the original buildings, including Jeter Hall and North Court, both residence halls, and Ryland Hall, the original administration building and library for Richmond College, were designed by Ralph Adams Cram in 1910. Cram, a noted institutional architect, also designed buildings for Princeton, Cornell, Rice, and Williams, among other universities. Warren H. Manning, a former apprentice to Frederick Law Olmsted, designed the original landscape plan. The overall effect of the gothic architecture set amid a landscape of pines, rolling hills, and Westhampton Lake, is intimate and tranquil. In 2000 and again in 2021, the campus was recognized by The Princeton Review as the most beautiful in the United States.

The University of Richmond owns the former Reynolds Metals Executive Office Building, a gift-purchase from Alcoa in 2001. Located a short distance from campus, the 250,000-square-foot (23,000 m^{2}) building was designed by architect Gordon Bunshaft and opened in 1958. The building, which incorporates nearly 1,400,000 pounds (640,000 kg) of aluminum, is listed in the National Register of Historic Places. It currently serves as the headquarters of Altria Group and its subsidiary, Philip Morris USA, which leases it from the institution.

In early 2001, the institution finalized the purchase of 115 acres (47 ha) of land in eastern Goochland County, a short distance from the main campus. The land is currently used for biology research, but future uses could include intramural athletic fields.

The University of Richmond campus used to be home to the Virginia Governor's School for Visual and Performing Arts and Humanities during the summer.

=== UR Downtown ===
The institution also operates UR Downtown, a downtown campus of sorts occupying leased space within a larger building at 626 East Broad Street. Despite its small size, UR Downtown hosts the Richmond on Broad café (owned and operated by the institution), a mixed-purpose lower-level, art gallery spaces, offices, two classrooms, and a conference room. Located in the city's Arts District, UR Downtown also participates in the monthly art festival, First Fridays. Moreover, the space hosts multiple exhibits each year, often in collaboration with local organizations. The UR Downtown conference room is also home to an original 1956 sgraffito-style mural by Hans E. Gassman, created for the bank that occupied the building in the past. Other than art, UR Downtown serves as a VITA site, providing free tax assistance to low-income families. The spaces inside UR Downtown are made available to advocacy and non-profit organizations in need of meeting space. The Caricco Center for Pro Bono law service, the Richmond Families Initiative, and Partners in the Arts also operate out of UR Downtown.

=== Safety ===
The college is protected by the University of Richmond Police Department. University of Richmond Emergency Medical Services, a student-run subsidiary of the Richmond Ambulance Authority, responds alongside campus police to medical emergencies.

== Athletics ==
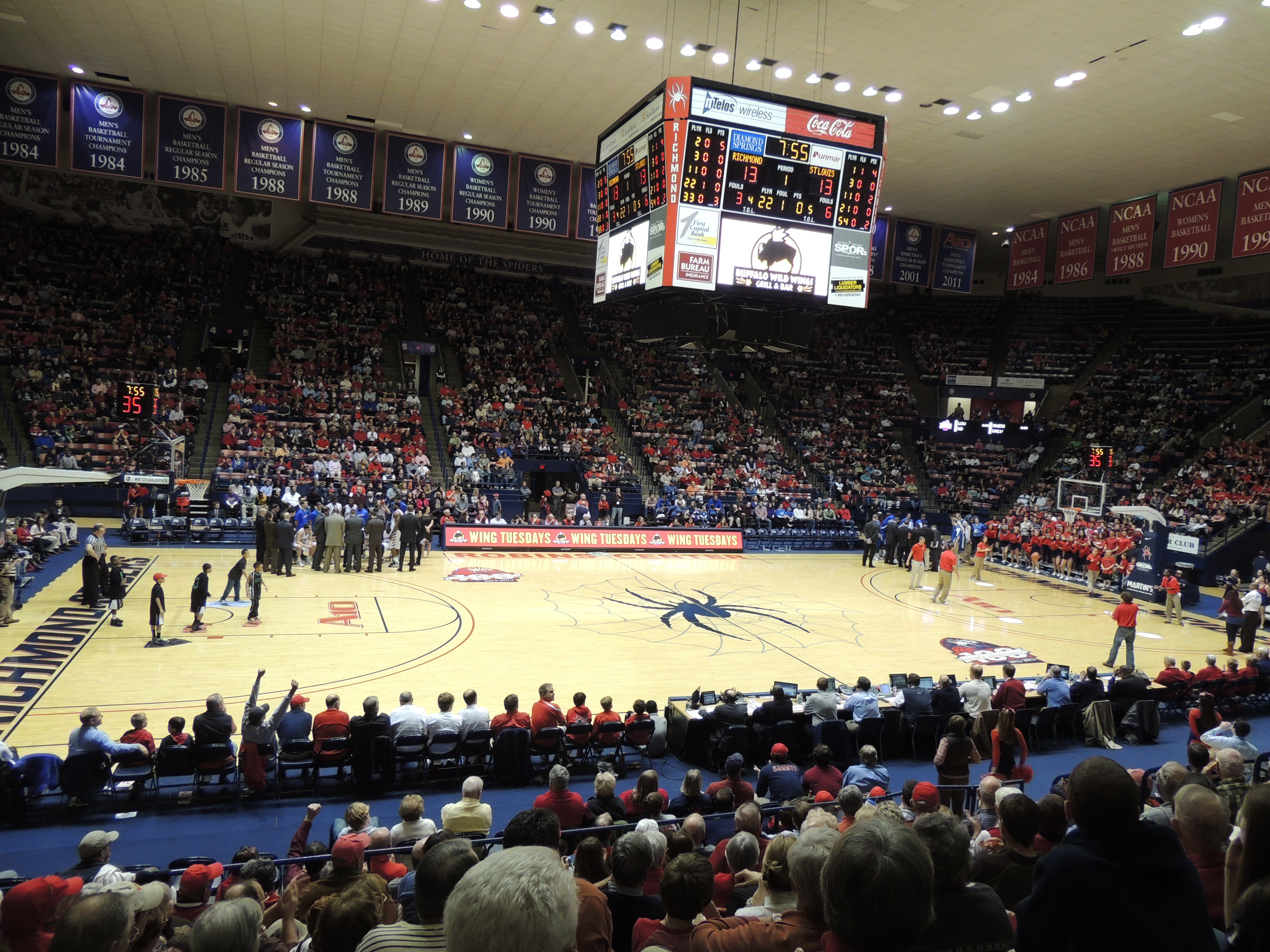
Robins Center

The institution won its first national championship in 1982 when women's tennis won the AIAW national championship. The institution won its first NCAA national championship in any sport on December 19, 2008, when the Spiders football team defeated the Montana Grizzlies 24–7 in the NCAA Division I Football Championship (which is exclusively for teams in the Football Championship Subdivision, the second tier of NCAA Division I football). Richmond was ranked 23rd in men's basketball at one point during the 2009–10 season. During its 2010 season, the Richmond Men's Cross Country team placed 24th at the NCAA Division I Cross Country Championships. In the 2020-2021 Cross Country season, Richmond Men's Cross Country team became the first NCAA Division I program without any scholarships or an indoor or outdoor track team to win a conference title. The 2010-11 Richmond Spiders men's basketball team won the 2011 Atlantic 10 men's basketball tournament, earning the team a spot in the 2011 NCAA Men's Division I Basketball Tournament. The Spiders fell to Kansas in the Sweet Sixteen.

=== Nickname ===
The institution's nickname dates to 1894 when baseball pitcher Henry Ellyson's long arms and wind up style was referred to by a local reporter as being like a spider's long arms. All of the athletic teams at the University of Richmond have since adopted the Spiders as their nickname.

== See also ==
- President of the University of Richmond
