= Michaele =

Michaele is a given name. Notable people with the name include:

- Michaele Jordana, Canadian painter and musician
- Michaele Pride-Wells (born 1956), American architect and educator
- Michaele Salahi (born 1965), American television personality and model
- Michaele Schreyer (born 1951), German politician
- Michaele Vollbracht (1947–2018), American fashion designer
- Michaele Whelan, American academic administrator
