= Mathilde Lange =

American biologist

Mathilde Margarethe Lange
- Born: April 14, 1888
- Died: June 1972 (aged 84)
- Education: University of Zurich

Mathilde Margarethe Lange (April (Note: Other source says March 14, 1888) 14, 1888 - June 1972) was an American biologist known for her research in experimental embryology. She was born in New York City and her father was a physician and surgeon. She attended the University of Zurich and earned her Ph.D. in 1920. She was employed by the United States Department of Agriculture for the first year following her Ph.D. as a researcher. Lange then moved to Wheaton College, Massachusetts as a professor of zoology, where she remained until her retirement in 1950. Her professional memberships included the New York Academy of Growth and the Genetic Association.
