= Anne Shaver =

American literary scholar

- Spouse: Susanne Woods

Academic background
- Education: University of Kentucky; Northwestern University; Ohio University

Academic work
- Discipline: English literature, queer studies
- Institutions: Denison University

Anne Shaver is an American literary scholar who is a professor emeritus at Denison University. She worked at the university from 1972 until her retirement in 2000 when she was the Lorena Woodrow Burke Professor of English.

== Life ==
Shaver earned an A.B. from the University of Kentucky in 1962 and an M.A. from Northwestern University in 1964.

Shaver taught at the University of Kentucky and Murray State University. She was a teaching assistant at Ohio University for three years. Shaver joined Denison University as an instructor of English the fall of 1972. She completed a Ph.D. from Ohio University in 1973 and was inducted as a member of Phi Beta Kappa. By 1986, Shaver was a tenured associate professor at Denison University. That same year, she began a relationship with English professor Susanne Woods. In 1992, she began teaching a partnership and politics freshman course that became a precursor for the university's queer studies concentration. By 1999, Shaver was the Lorena Woodrow Burke Professor of English. She retired from Denison University in 2000.

Shaver is a professor emeritus at Denison University.

== Selected works ==
- Shaver, Anne, ed. (1999). The Convent of Pleasure" and Other Plays. Johns Hopkins University Press. ISBN 978-0-8018-6099-7.
