= Dale Rogers Marshall =

American political scientist (1937–2021)

President of Wheaton College
- In office 1992–2004

Personal details
- Born: March 22, 1937 Ithaca, New York, U.S.
- Died: January 14, 2021 (aged 83) Berkeley, California, U.S.
- Spouse: Donald Marshall
- Parent: William P. Rogers (father)
- Education: Cornell University (B.A.); UC Berkeley (M.A.); UCLA (Ph.D.)
- Awards: 2002 recipient of the Greater Boston Chamber of Commerce Pinnacle Award for women leaders; U.C. Davis Distinguished Teaching Award

Dale Rogers Marshall (March 22, 1937 – January 14, 2021) was an American political scientist, academic administrator and the sixth president of Wheaton College from 1992 to 2004.

== Biography ==
Marshall, a member of Phi Beta Kappa, earned her bachelor's degree, with high honors, in government from Cornell University and a master's degree in political science from University of California, Berkeley, where she studied as a Woodrow Wilson Fellow. She then obtained a Ph.D. in Political Science from UCLA in 1969, where she held a Regents Fellowship. She held an Honorary Doctorate Degree in Law from Wheaton College (MA).

Her parents were former Secretary of State and Attorney General William Pierce Rogers and his wife, Adele Rogers.

She taught at UC Berkeley and UCLA before she became a Professor of Political Science at UC Davis, where she was honored with the Distinguished Teaching Award in 1975. She served as an Associate Dean of the College of Letters and Sciences and as Faculty Assistant to the Vice Chancellor at UC Davis. From 1986 to 1992, she was an Academic Dean of Wellesley College and also served as its Acting President from 1987 to 1988. She was selected as the sixth president of Wheaton College (MA) in 1992.

Marshall was a member of the Cornell University Board of Trustees from 1983 to 1993 and served as the Trustee of Wheaton College in Massachusetts. She was elected to the National Academy of Public Administration in 1987. She was the Director of the National Association of Independent Colleges and Universities since 1996, and was a member of the Council on Foreign Relations, and the American Student Assistance Guarantor Board. She chaired the Association of Independent Colleges and Universities of Massachusetts and the American Council on Education's Leadership Commission and served as a Board Member of the New England Zenith Fund of the New England Mutual Life Insurance Company and as Vice President of the American Political Science Association and President of the Western Political Science Association.

The Marshall Center for Intercultural Learning at Wheaton College was dedicated to her on April 15, 2005.

Marshall died from complications of COVID-19 on January 14, 2021, in Berkeley, California, aged 83. She was survived by her husband, three children and six grandchildren.

== Academic work ==
She was a specialist in American racial politics. Her books include

- (Co-author with Rufus P Browning & David H Tabb) Protest is Not Enough: The Struggle of Blacks and Hispanics for Equality in Urban Politics (UC Press, 1984).
- (co-editor with Rufus P Browning & David H Tabb), Racial Politics in American Cities ( 1st ed, Longman, 1990; 2nd ed., 1997).
- Urban Policy making Sage, 1979.
- The Politics of Participation in Poverty; A Case Study of the Board of the Economic and Youth Opportunities Agency of Greater Los Angeles. Berkeley: University of California Press, 1971.
