= Susanne Woods =

American literary scholar and academic administrator

President-elect of the College of Wooster
- In office April 6, 1995 – June 30, 1995
- Preceded by: Henry Copeland
- Succeeded by: R. Stanton Hales

Personal details
- Born: Frances Susanne Woods; 1943 (age 82–83) Hawaii, U.S.
- Spouse: Anne Shaver
- Education: University of California, Los Angeles; Columbia University

Frances Susanne Woods (born 1943) is an American literary scholar and academic administrator who was the provost of Wheaton College from 1999 to 2006. She was the president-elect of the College of Wooster in 1995. Woods was previously a faculty member at Brown University for nineteen years.

== Life ==
Woods was born in 1943 in Hawaii. She earned a degree in political science and English from the University of California, Los Angeles. She earned a Ph.D. in English and comparative literature from Columbia University in 1970. Her dissertation was titled, The Poetry of Sir Walter Raleigh.

Woods taught at the University of Hawaiʻi. She worked at Brown University for nineteen years. While at Brown, she was an English professor, associate dean of faculty, and director of the women writers project. At Franklin & Marshall College, she was the a provost, dean and vice president for academic affairs.

On April 6, 1995, Woods was selected as the president-elect of the College of Wooster. She was set to succeed Henry Copeland on July 1, 1995, to become the first female president of the institution. In an April meeting to express grievances about the selection process, James Perley, a biology professor and president of the American Association of University Professors, shared a Denison University telephone directory listing Woods as the partner of Anne Shaver, an English professor. An anonymous letter was later distributed suggesting Woods was a lesbian. Woods withdrew from the position of president-elect on June 30, 1995. She was given a severance package distributed over a twenty-four month period.

From 1999 to 2006, Woods was provost of Wheaton College. In 2012, she joined the board of governors of the Community Foundation of the Florida Keys. She served as the interim chair during recovery efforts after Hurricane Irma. Woods later chaired the board for over two years. She moved to Hawaii for one year before returning in 2019 to chair the board for another two years. She stepped down in 2022.

As of 2022, Woods lives on Sugarloaf Key with her wife, Shaver.

== Selected works ==
- Woods, Susanne (1984). Natural Emphasis: English Versification from Chaucer to Dryden. Huntington Library. ISBN 978-0-87328-085-3.
- Woods, Susanne, ed. (1993). The Poems of Aemilia Lanyer: Salve Deus Rex Judaeorum. OUP USA. ISBN 978-0-19-508361-3.
- Woods, Susanne (1999). Lanyer: A Renaissance Woman Poet. Oxford University Press. ISBN 978-0-19-535234-4.
- Benstock, Shari; Ferriss, Suzanne; Woods, Susanne, eds. (2002). A Handbook of Literary Feminisms. Oxford University Press. ISBN 978-0-19-510206-2.
- Woods, Susanne (2013). Milton and the Poetics of Freedom. Duquesne University Press. ISBN 978-0-8207-0466-1.
