= Dennis M. Hanno =

Former president of Wheaton College (born 1955)

Dennis Hanno

11th President of Wheaton College
- In office 2014–2021
- Preceded by: Ronald Crutcher
- Succeeded by: Michaele Whelan

Personal details
- Born: 1955 (age 70–71)
- Children: 2
- Education: University of Notre Dame (BBA); Western New England University (MS); University of Massachusetts Amherst (PhD)

Dennis M. Hanno (born 1955) is an American accountant and academic administrator was served as 8th president of Wheaton College in Norton, Massachusetts, for more than seven-year term. He also served as provost of Babson College. Hanno is a Clinical Associate Professor at Gabelli School of Business at Fordham University.

== Early life and education ==
Hanno grew up in a small town in upstate New York and earned a Bachelor of Business Administration in accounting from the University of Notre Dame in 1977. He later earned a Master of Science in accounting from Western New England University in 1981 and a PhD in management from the Isenberg School of Management at University of Massachusetts Amherst in 1990.

== Career ==
Before beginning his career in higher education, Hanno worked as a certified public accountant in New York and Massachusetts, founding and running his own firm in Lowville, New York from 1982 to 1985. In 1990, he became an assistant professor of accounting at the Carroll School of Management at Boston College, where he worked until 1992. From 1992 to 2006, Hanno worked at the University of Massachusetts Amherst's Isenberg School of Management, where he taught as an associate and assistant professor of accounting and served as associate dean for undergraduate matters.

In 2006, he joined the staff at Babson College, as a President's Endowed Professor of accounting and dean of the undergraduate school. Hanno helped establish and became the first director of the Babson Entrepreneurial Leadership Academy, a program that works with high school students in other countries to help them develop leadership skills and encourage entrepreneurial ideas. In September 2010, he helped found the Babson-Rwanda Entrepreneurship Center in Kigali, Rwanda, and became its executive director. In 2012, Hanno was appointed as murata dean of the F.W. Olin Graduate School of Business and vice provost of Babson College, and in 2013 he was promoted to provost and senior vice president of the college.

Hanno was appointed as president of Wheaton College on February 22, 2014 and was officially welcomed to the Wheaton community during a ceremony held February 25, 2014. He took office on July 15, 2014 as the college's eighth president over its 180 years of history.

Under Hanno's leadership, Wheaton has launched a variety of initiatives promoting social innovation and social entrepreneurship within the liberal arts, many of which are located within the WiN Hub (Wheaton Innovates Now). The new programs have been made possible with the support of the Diana Davis Spencer Foundation and include the establishment of an endowed professorship in social entrepreneurship.

The focus on social innovation reflects Hanno's work as an educator and entrepreneur. He is the founder and head of IDEA4Africa, a non-profit that seeks to inspire and equip youth entrepreneurs to develop social and economic value for their communities and for the world. The organization grew from Hanno's work leading leadership and innovation seminars in East Africa, work that he began during his tenure at the University of Massachusetts Amherst.

He is an occasional contributor to The Washington Post. He also serves as a commissioner of the New England Commission of Higher Education, a three-year term that began in 2019.

== Family and personal life ==
Hanno is married to his wife, Susan. They have two children, Ted and Emily.
