= William P. Rogers =

American politician (1913–2001)

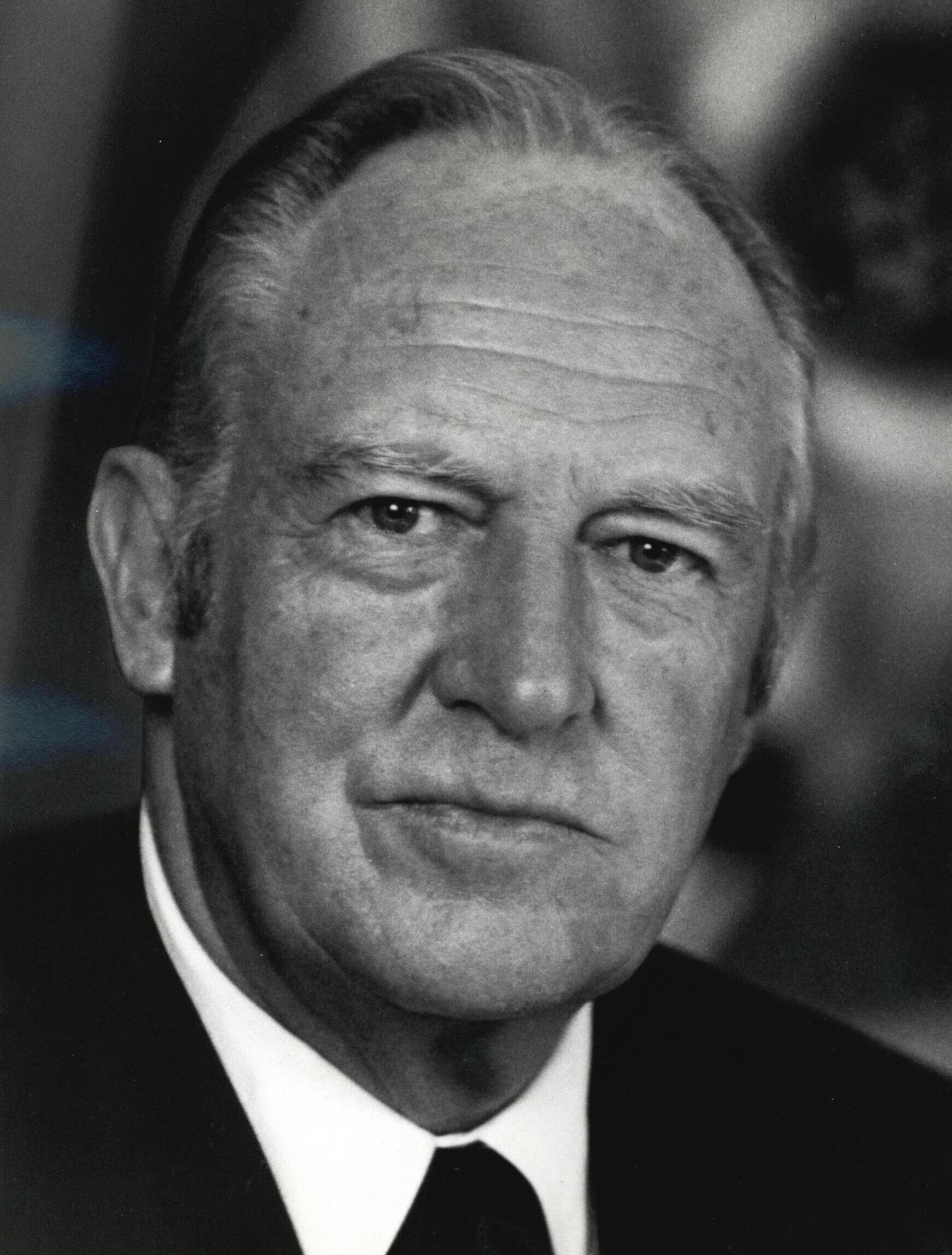
- Official portrait, 1969

55th United States Secretary of State
- In office January 22, 1969 – September 3, 1973
- President: Richard Nixon
- Preceded by: Dean Rusk
- Succeeded by: Henry Kissinger

63rd United States Attorney General
- In office October 23, 1957 – January 20, 1961
- President: Dwight Eisenhower
- Preceded by: Herbert Brownell
- Succeeded by: Robert F. Kennedy

4th United States Deputy Attorney General
- In office January 20, 1953 – October 23, 1957
- President: Dwight Eisenhower
- Preceded by: Ross L. Malone
- Succeeded by: Lawrence Walsh

Personal details
- Born: William Pierce Rogers; June 23, 1913 Norfolk, New York, U.S.
- Died: January 2, 2001 (aged 87) Bethesda, Maryland, U.S.
- Resting place: Arlington National Cemetery
- Party: Republican
- Spouse: Adele Langston (m. 1937)
- Children: 4, including Dale
- Education: Colgate University (BA); Cornell University (LLB)

Military service
- Allegiance: United States
- Branch/service: United States Navy
- Years of service: 1942-1945
- Rank: Lieutenant Commander
- Unit: USS Intrepid
- Battles/wars: World War II; Battle of Okinawa

William Pierce Rogers (June 23, 1913 – January 2, 2001) was an American politician, diplomat, and attorney. A member of the Republican Party, he served as Attorney General in the administration of Dwight D. Eisenhower and as U.S. Secretary of State in the administration of Richard Nixon.

Rogers was an ally of Nixon, but National Security Advisor Henry Kissinger overshadowed Rogers and eventually succeeded him as Secretary of State in September 1973. At the time of his death in 2001, Rogers was the last surviving member of Eisenhower's cabinet.

== Early life and education ==
Rogers was born June 23, 1913, in Norfolk, New York. After the death of his mother, the former Myra Beswick, he was raised during his teen years by his grandparents in the village of Canton, New York, where he graduated from high school in 1930. He attended Colgate University, where he was initiated into the Sigma Chi fraternity. He then attended Cornell Law School, where he was an editor of the Cornell Law Quarterly. He received his LL.B. in 1937, graduating fifth in his class of 47 as a member of the Order of the Coif, passing the New York bar in the same year.

== Career ==
After having served about a year as an attorney for a Wall Street law firm, he became an assistant district attorney in 1938 and was appointed by District Attorney Thomas E. Dewey to a 60-man task force aimed at routing out New York City's organized crime.

Rogers entered the Navy in 1942, serving on the USS Intrepid, including her action in the Battle of Okinawa. His final rank was lieutenant commander.

After the war, Rogers joined the United States Congress as a committee counsel. While serving on a Senate committee, Rogers examined documentation from the House Un-American Activities Committee's investigation of Alger Hiss at the request of Representative Richard M. Nixon. He advised Nixon that Hiss had lied and that the case against him should be pursued.

On August 17, 1948, Senator Homer S. Ferguson, chairman of a Senate subcommittee on expenditures in the executive department, stated by speech and letter that the Office of the United States Attorney General had approved its espionage investigation that had started with Elizabeth Bentley on July 28. Ferguson denied that his subcommittee "has in any way interfered with any criminal prosecution." Ferguson's letter explained that counsel William P. Rogers had consulted with the Attorney General's assistants on June 9. He stated that Rogers had "advised them of our purpose and the procedure planned to be followed, the witnesses who were to be called and the questions they would be asked." That evening, Attorney General Tom C. Clark wrote a letter that contradicted Ferguson as to whether and when Ferguson's committee had "cleared" its public hearings with him.

Clark's letter stated it was "incorrect" that by June 9, 1948, Fergusons' subcommittee had told his office about its intention. Instead, the USAG had heard of the subcommittee's intentions as those public hearings started on July 28. Clark wrote, "It is difficult to say how much damage the efforts to arrive at a sound basis for prosecution in the espionage case has been done by the open hearings." The story broke in newspapers next day.

In 1950, Rogers became a partner in a New York City law firm, Dwight, Royall, Harris, Koegel & Caskey. He thereafter returned to the firm when he was not in government service.

Rogers advised Nixon in the slush fund scandal, which led to Nixon's Checkers speech in 1952.

=== 1953–1957: Deputy Attorney General ===
Rogers joined the Administration of President Dwight D. Eisenhower as Deputy Attorney General in 1953.

As Deputy Attorney General, Rogers had some role in or insight into the process that led to the execution of Julius and Ethel Rosenberg for espionage.

As deputy attorney general, Rogers was involved in the Little Rock Integration Crisis in the fall of 1957 of Central High School in Little Rock, Arkansas. In that capacity, he worked with Osro Cobb, the United States Attorney for the Eastern District of Arkansas, to implement federal orders and to maintain peace in the capital city. Cobb would recall in his memoirs that Rogers called him to discuss the possibility of violence: "Our conversation was somewhat guarded. I had never recommended the use of federal troops, and Rogers asked if I thought they were necessary. I told him I hoped not. Then to my surprise he stated, 'They are on their way already.'"

=== 1957–1961: Attorney General ===
Rogers served as Attorney General from 1957 to 1961. He remained a close advisor to Vice President Nixon throughout the Eisenhower administration, especially during Eisenhower's two medical crises. Rogers became attorney general upon the resignation of his superior, Herbert Brownell Jr., who had worked to implement the desegregation of Little Rock Central High School. In 1958, Little Rock closed its public schools for a year to oppose further desegregation required by the U.S. government. At the time, Rogers said, "It seems inconceivable that a state or community would rather close its public schools than comply with decisions of the Supreme Court."

In 1959, Martin Luther King Jr. hailed Rogers for advocating the integration of an elementary school in Alabama that had excluded the children of black military personnel.

=== 1961–1969: Hiatus ===
After the Eisenhower administration, Rogers returned to his law practice, now renamed to Rogers & Wells, where he worked until his early eighties. He played an important role in New York Times Co. v. Sullivan a 1964 case before the Supreme Court.

From 1962 to 1963, Rogers was head of the Federal City Council, a group of business, civic, education, and other leaders for the economic development in Washington, DC.

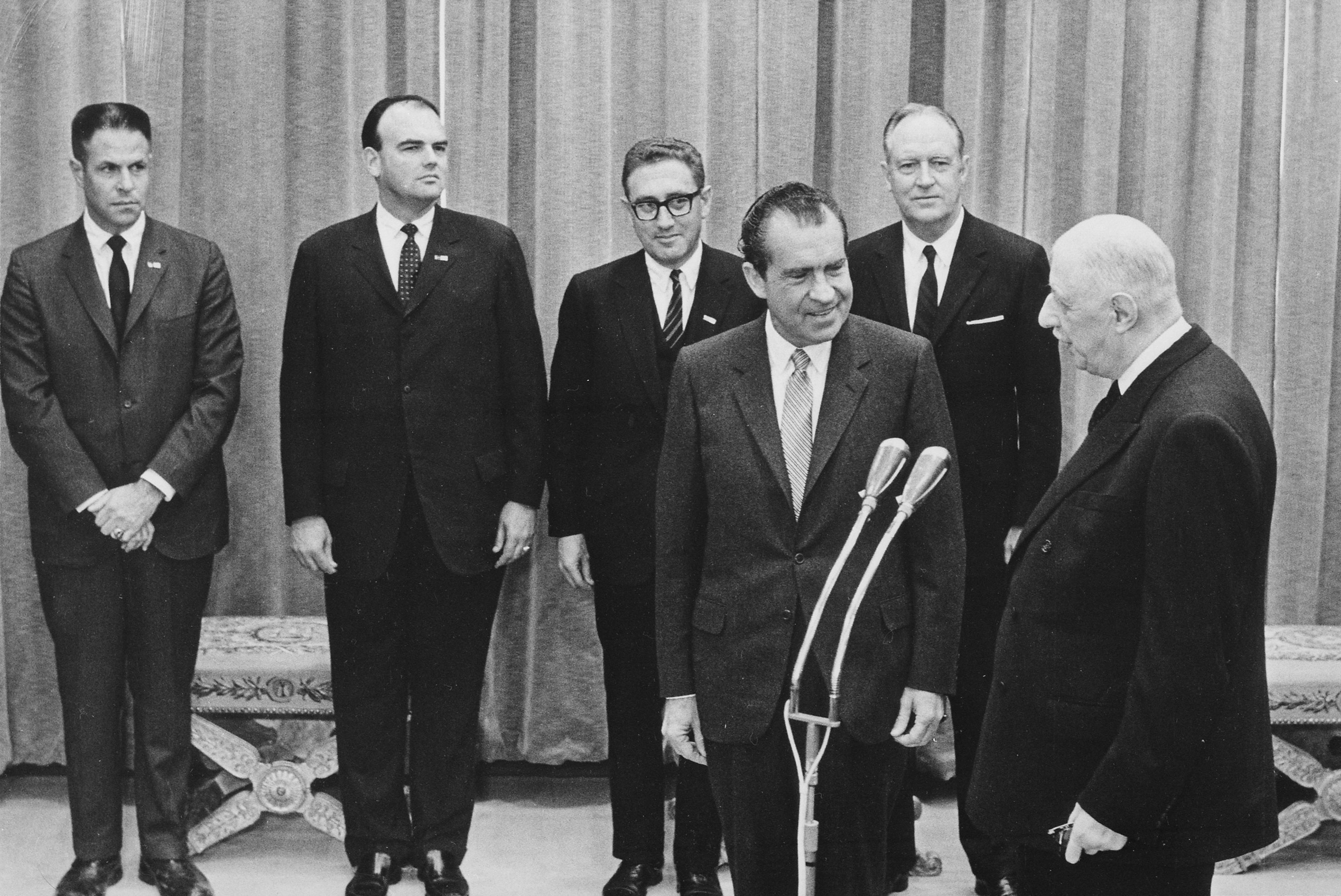
William P. Rogers (right, in background) with staff members as President Richard Nixon speaks to French President Charles de Gaulle in March 1969.

=== 1969–1973: Secretary of State ===
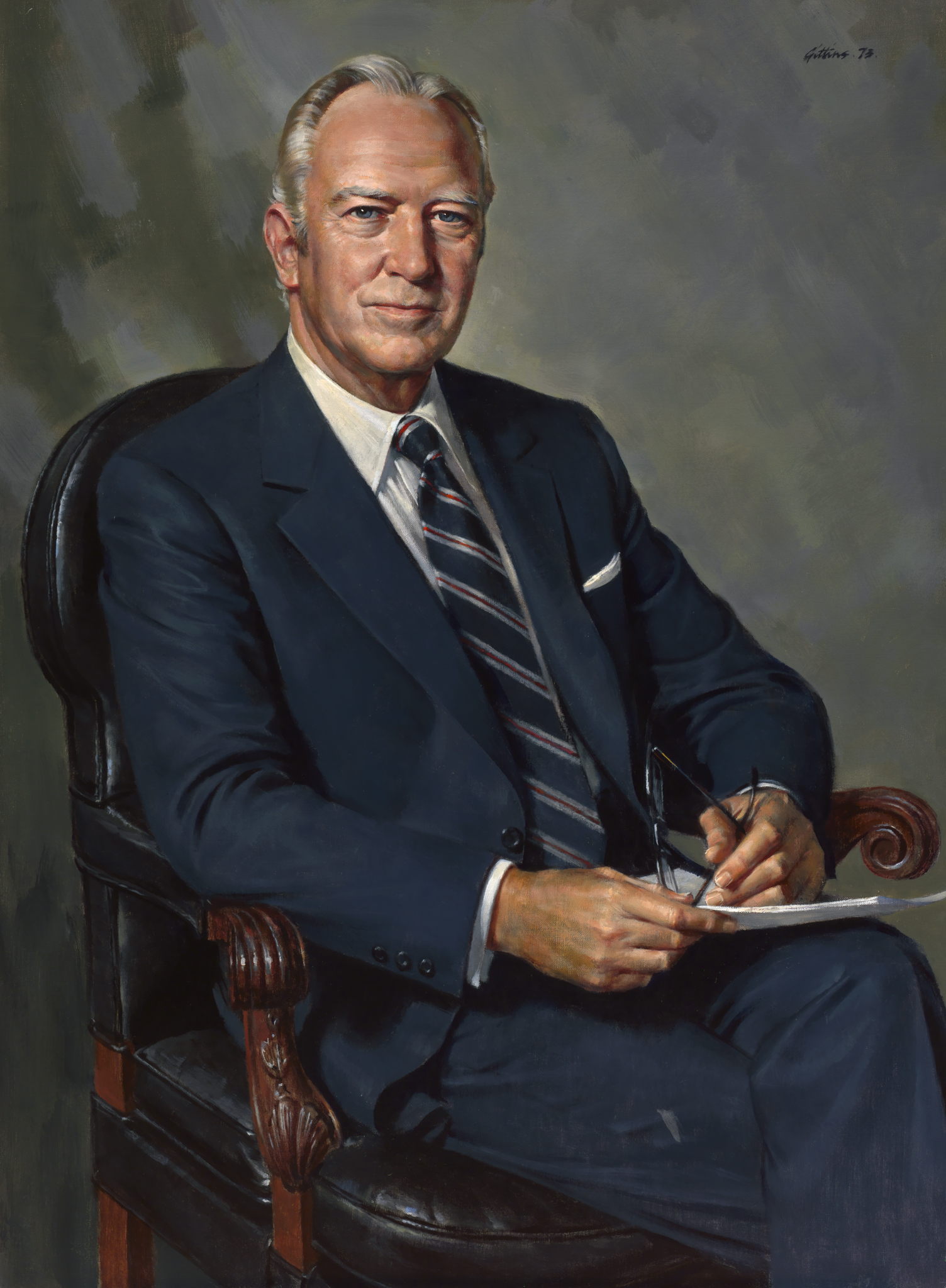
The official portrait of Secretary of State Rogers, 1970.

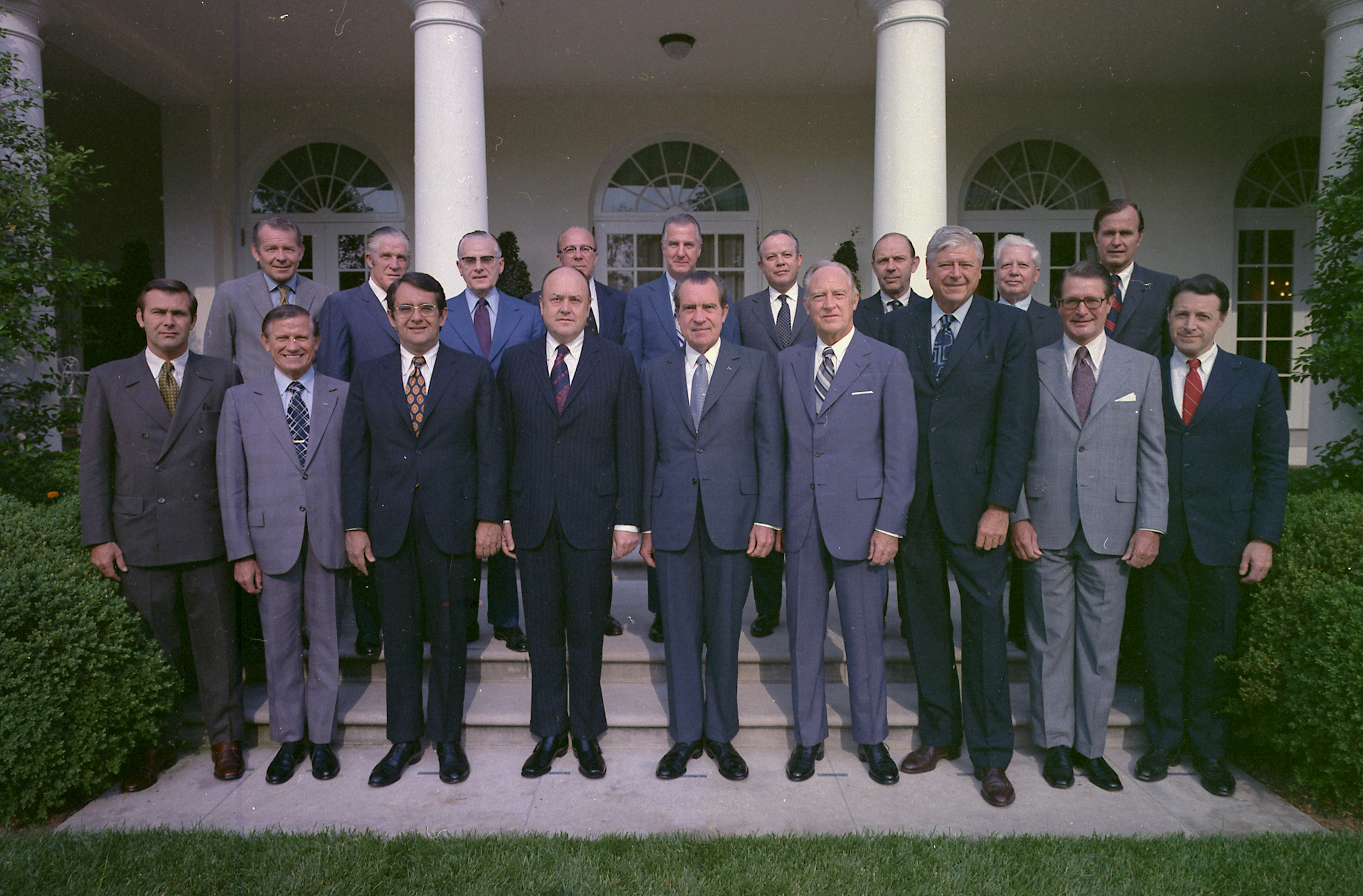
William Rogers in a group photo of Nixon's cabinet on June 16, 1972, immediately to Nixon's right (sixth from the left on the bottom row).

Rogers succeeded Dean Rusk as Secretary of State in the Nixon administration from January 22, 1969, to September 3, 1973. Nixon had long distrusted the State Department, whom he had accused under the Truman administration of being staffed with liberal diplomats who were insufficiently anti-communist and who were responsible for the "loss of China" in 1949. Given his dislike of the State Department, Nixon when he came into office in 1969 wanted to conduct his foreign policy via the National Security Council in a bid to marginalize the State Department.

Nixon had selected an ambitious political science professor from Harvard, Henry Kissinger, to be his national security adviser who soon emerged as his main adviser on foreign affairs. Nixon selected Rogers to be the secretary of state because he knew nothing of foreign affairs and was unlikely to assert the interests of the State Department. On Nixon's Inauguration Day, January 20, 1969, Rogers was handed a lengthy volume containing a summary of the world's major issues written by the State Department's leading experts in order to brief him for his new job, leading him to remark in surprise: "You don't expect me to read all this stuff, do you?" Rogers's ignorance of foreign policy issues and his unwillingness to assert the interests of the State Department duly led, as hoped by Nixon, to its marginalization. Major decisions were made by Kissinger, without the input or even knowledge of Rogers.

In February 1969, Nixon began to discuss plans to bomb the Viet Cong and North Vietnamese bases just over the border in Cambodia, which Rogers felt was unwise, warning that such a bombing offensive might damage the peace talks in Paris. On March 16, 1969, Rogers attended a meeting at the White House where Nixon discussed Operation Menu, the plans to bomb Cambodia in secret. Though the State Department's experts stated that the main source of weapons for the Viet Cong was the Ho Chi Minh Trail coming down from North Vietnam via Laos, not Cambodia, Rogers had not read their assessments. He offered tepid opposition to the operation, which began the next day.

Despite being stymied by Nixon and Kissinger, Rogers was still able to further the aims of the State Department. On December 3, 1969, he introduced a peace plan for Arab–Israeli conflict termed the Rogers Plan.

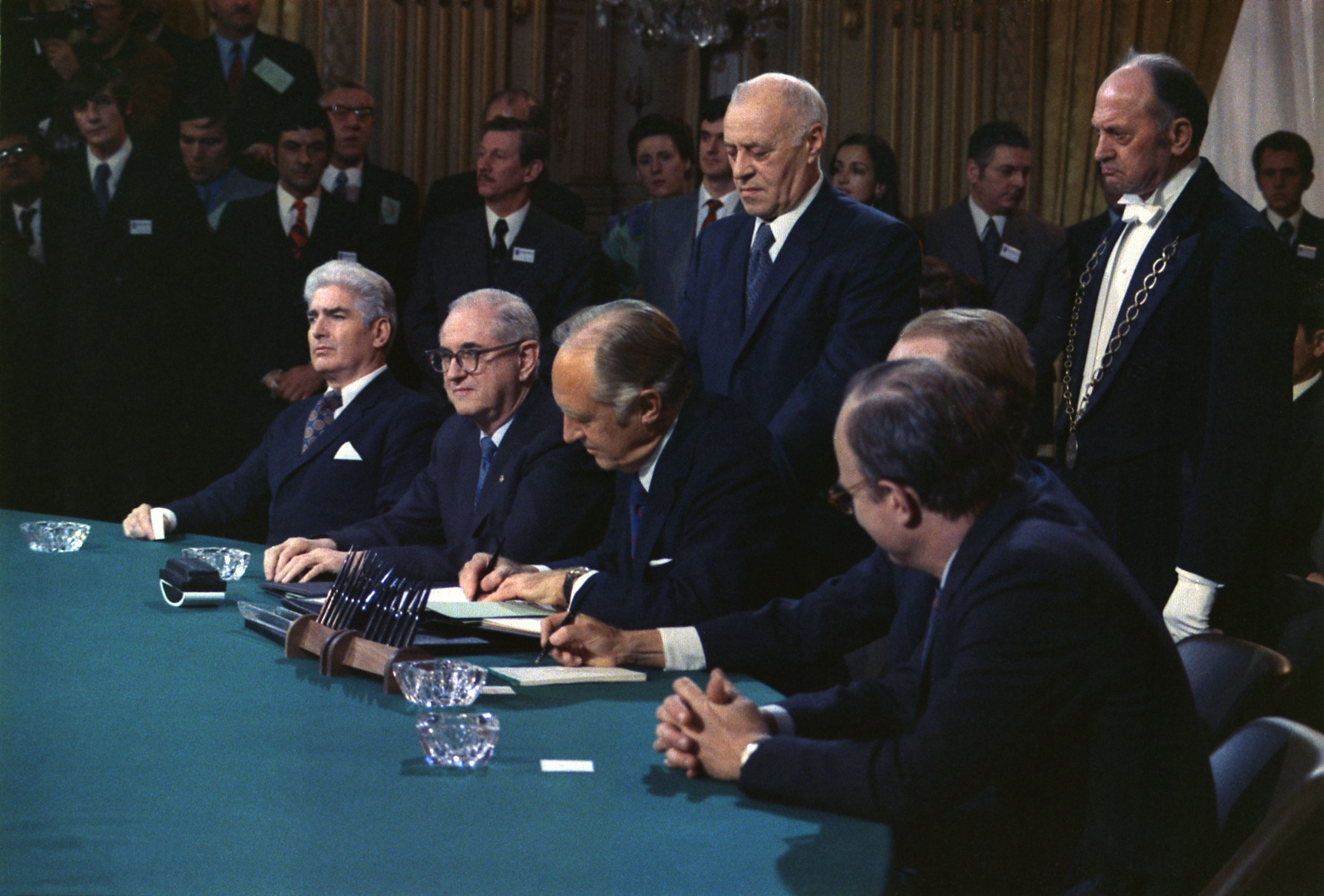
Rogers signing the Paris Peace Accords.

On the night of February 21, 1970, Kissinger first met in secret with the North Vietnamese diplomat Le Duc Tho in a house in Paris suburb, opening a new set of talks that were independent of the official peace talks in Paris. Kissinger only first informed Rogers of the secret talks in Paris parallel to the official talks in February 1971, a year later. On March 23, 1970, Rogers told the press that the United States had the utmost respect for the "neutrality, sovereignty and independence" of Cambodia, stating categorically there no plans to invade Cambodia. In the same press conference, Rogers stated: "We don't anticipate that any request will be made" for help from the new Lon Nol government. Unknown to him, Nixon and Kissinger were already discussing plans to invade Cambodia. On April 30, 1970, the United States invaded Cambodia.

On October 15, 1973, Rogers received the Presidential Medal of Freedom from Nixon. At the same ceremony, his wife, Adele Rogers, was presented with the Presidential Citizens Medal.

== Later life ==
Ronald Reagan asked Rogers to play the US president in IVY LEAGUE 82 (March 1982), a command post exercise of American nuclear forces under SIOP.

Rogers led the investigation into the explosion of the space shuttle Challenger. The Rogers Commission was the first investigation to criticize NASA management for its role in negligence of safety in the Space Shuttle program. Among the more famous members of Rogers's panel were astronauts Neil Armstrong and Sally Ride, Air Force general Donald Kutyna, and physicist Richard Feynman.

Rogers worked at his law firm, now renamed Clifford Chance Rogers & Wells after a 1999 merger, in its Washington office until several months before his death.

== Personal life ==
Rogers married Adele Langston (August 15, 1911 – May 27, 2001), a fellow law student whom he had met at Cornell. They had four children, including Dale Rogers Marshall.

William P. Rogers died of congestive heart failure, at the Suburban Hospital in Bethesda, Maryland, on January 2, 2001, at the age of 87. Rogers was buried in Arlington National Cemetery.

== Legacy ==
In his memoirs, Kissinger said of Rogers, "Nixon considered Rogers's unfamiliarity with the subject [foreign policy] an asset because it guaranteed that policy direction would remain in the White House... Few secretaries of state can have been selected because of their president's confidence in their ignorance of foreign policy."

In 2001, the Rogers family donated to Cornell Law Library materials to reflect the lives of William and Adele Rogers, mostly from 1969 to 1973.

== Publications ==
Articles

- "U.S. Foreign Policy: A Discussion with Former Secretaries of State Dean Rusk, William P. Rogers, Cyrus R. Vance, and Alexander M. Haig, Jr.". International Studies Notes, Vol. 11, No. 1, Special Edition: The Secretaries of State, Fall 1984. JSTOR 44234902 (pp. 10–20)

https://www.nyshistoricnewspapers.org/?a=d&d=caf19470618-01.1.1&e=-------en-20--1--txt-txIN----------

== Sources ==
- The Presidency Project
- Karnow, Stanley (1983). Vietnam: A History. New York: Viking Books.

== Notes ==
Legal offices
Preceded by Ross Malone	United States Deputy Attorney General; 1953–1957	Succeeded by Lawrence Walsh
Preceded by Herbert Brownell	United States Attorney General; 1957–1961	Succeeded by Robert Kennedy
Political offices
Preceded by Dean Rusk	United States Secretary of State; 1969–1973	Succeeded by Henry Kissinger
