= Wheaton College (Massachusetts) =

Private college in Norton, Massachusetts, US

- Former name: Wheaton Female Seminary (1834–1912)
- Motto: "That They May Have Life and Have it Abundantly" (John 10:10)
- Type: Private liberal arts college
- Established: 1834; 192 years ago as a female seminary, 1912 chartered as a four-year women's college
- Accreditation: NECHE
- Academic affiliations: Space-grant
- Endowment: $287.4 million (2025)
- President: Michaele Whelan
- Faculty: 140
- Students: 1,773
- Location: Norton, Massachusetts, U.S. 41°58′06″N 71°11′04″W
- Campus: 478 acres; Suburban, residential
- Nickname: Lyons
- Website: www.wheatoncollege.edu

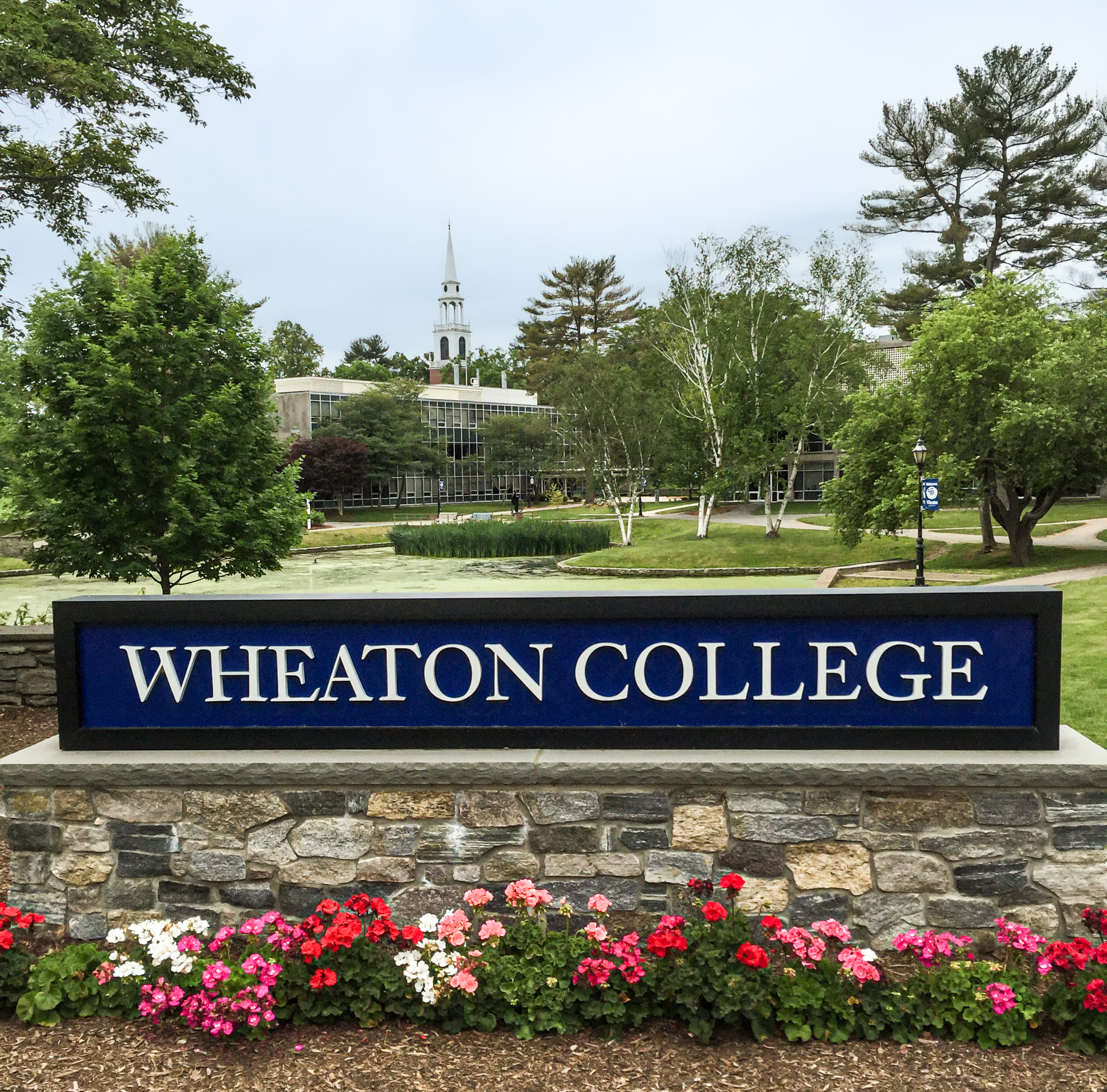
Welcome sign

Wheaton College is a private liberal arts college in Norton, Massachusetts. Wheaton was founded in 1834 as a female seminary. The trustees officially changed the name of the Wheaton Female Seminary to Wheaton College in 1912 after receiving a college charter from the Commonwealth of Massachusetts. It remained one of the oldest institutions of higher education for women in the United States until men began to be admitted in 1988. It enrolls 1,669 undergraduate students.

== History ==
In 1834, Eliza Wheaton Strong, the daughter of Laban Wheaton, died at the age of thirty-nine. Eliza Baylies Chapin Wheaton, his daughter-in-law and a founder of the Trinitarian Congregational Church of Norton, persuaded him to memorialize his daughter by founding a female seminary.

The family called upon noted women's educator Mary Lyon for assistance in establishing the seminary. Lyon created the first curriculum with the goal that it be equal in quality to those of men's colleges. She also provided the first principal, Eunice Caldwell. Wheaton Female Seminary opened in Norton, Massachusetts on 22 April 1835, with 50 students and three teachers.

Lyon and Caldwell left Wheaton to open Mount Holyoke Female Seminary in 1837 (now Mount Holyoke College). After their departure, Wheaton endured a period of fluctuating enrollment and frequent changes in leadership until 1850, when Caroline Cutler Metcalf was recruited as the new principal. Metcalf made the hiring of outstanding faculty her top priority, bringing in educators who encouraged students to discuss ideas rather than to memorize facts. The most notable additions to the faculty were Lucy Larcom, who introduced the study of English Literature and founded the student literary magazine The Rushlight; and Mary Jane Cragin, who used innovative techniques to teach geometry and made mathematics the favorite study of many students.

Metcalf retired in 1876. A. Ellen Stanton, a teacher of French since 1871, served as principal from 1880 to 1897. She led the seminary during a difficult time, when it faced competition from increasing numbers of public high schools and colleges granting bachelor's degrees to women.

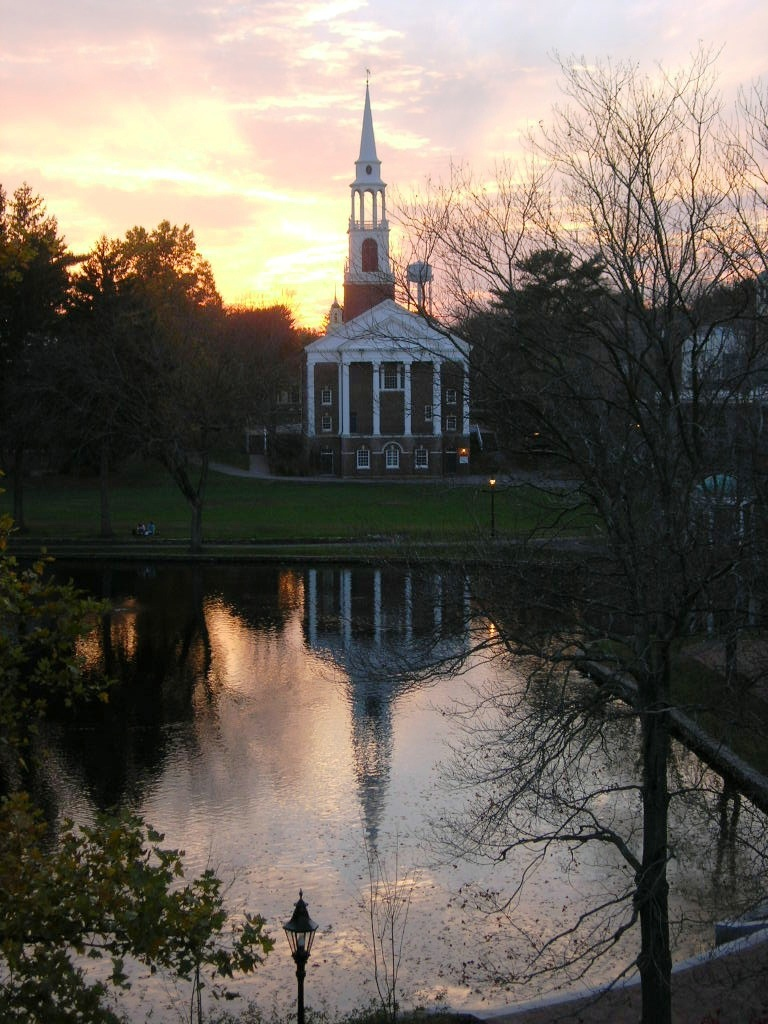
Cole Memorial Chapel

In 1897, at the suggestion of Eliza Baylies Wheaton, the trustees hired Samuel Valentine Cole as the seminary's first male president. Preparing to seek a charter as a four-year college, Cole began a program of revitalization that included expanding and strengthening the curriculum, increasing the number and quality of the faculty, and adding six new buildings.

The Commonwealth of Massachusetts granted Wheaton a college charter in 1912, and the trustees changed the name of the school to Wheaton College. The Student Government Association was organized to represent the "consensus of opinion of the whole student body", and to encourage individual responsibility, integrity, and self-government. Wheaton received authorization to establish a chapter of Phi Beta Kappa in 1932, twenty years after achieving college status.

Cole died unexpectedly in 1925 after a brief illness. During his career as president, Cole oversaw the expansion of the campus from three to 27 buildings, the growth of enrollment from 50 to 414, and the establishment of an endowment. On the campus, Cole Memorial Chapel is named after him.

John Edgar Park, who became president in 1926, continued Cole's building program, and saw the college through the Great Depression, the celebration of its centennial in 1935 and World War II. He retired in 1944, and was succeeded by Dartmouth College Professor of History Alexander Howard Meneely. During his tenure, the trustees voted to expand the size of the college from 525 to 800 to 1000 students, and construction of "new campus" began in 1957.

Meneely died in 1961 after a long illness and was succeeded in 1962 by William C.H. Prentice, a psychology professor and administrator at Swarthmore College. In the early 1960s, Wheaton successfully completed its first endowment campaign. The development of new campus continued, and student enrollment grew to 1,200. Wheaton students and faculty joined in nationwide campus protests against United States actions in Indochina in 1970.

In 1975, Wheaton inaugurated its first female president, Alice Frey Emerson, dean of students at the University of Pennsylvania. Emerson would go on to receive the Valeria Knapp Award from The College Club of Boston in 1987 for establishing the Global Awareness Program at Wheaton College. Wheaton celebrated its Sesquicentennial in 1984/85 with a year-long series of symposia, concerts, dance performances, art and history exhibits, and an endowment and capital campaign. In 1987, the trustees voted to admit men to Wheaton. The first coeducational class was enrolled in September 1988.

Dale Rogers Marshall, Academic Dean at Wellesley College, was inaugurated as Wheaton's sixth president in 1992. She led the college in "The Campaign for Wheaton", to build endowed and current funds for faculty development, student scholarships, and academic programs and facilities. Enrollment growth encouraged the construction of the first new residence halls since 1964 (Gebbie, Keefe and Beard residence halls), the improvement of classroom buildings and the renovation and expansion of the college's arts' facilities.

Wheaton's Board of Trustees appointed Ronald A. Crutcher as the seventh president of the college on March 23, 2004. Crutcher came to Wheaton from Miami University in Oxford, Ohio, where he served as provost and executive vice president for academic affairs and professor of music. During his tenure, he ran funding campaigns raising $37M for the new Mars Science Center and more than $53M in new scholarship endowments, as well as new athletic facilities, faculty-mentored research, and career services.[1]

Dennis M. Hanno was appointed the eighth president in 2014 and served until 2021. Hanno accentuated Wheaton's emphasis on diversity and a student-centered approach to education. One of his initiatives offers a full scholarship to one refugee student each year, with preference for students from countries subject to immigration restrictions proposed by Donald Trump in 2016.

Wheaton's current president is Michaele Whelan.

=== Presidents ===
The following is a list of Wheaton College presidents with the years of their presidential tenures.

- Samuel Valentine Cole (1912–1925)
- George Thomas Smart, Acting President (1925–1926)
- John Edgar Park (1926–1944)
- A. Howard Meneely (1944–1961)
- Elizabeth Stoffregen May, Acting President (1961–1962)
- William Courtney Hamilton Prentice (1962–1975)
- Alice Frey Emerson (1975–1991)
- Hannah Goldberg, Acting President (1991–1992)
- Dale Rogers Marshall (1992–2004)
- Ronald Crutcher (2004–2014)
- Dennis M. Hanno (2014–2021)
- Michaele Whelan (2022–present)

== Academics ==
Wheaton offers a liberal arts education leading to a Bachelor of Arts degree in more than 100 majors and minors. Students are permitted to work with faculty members to design self-declared majors. Wheaton College is accredited by the New England Commission of Higher Education. The most popular majors, based on 2021 graduates, were:

- Business Administration and Management (53)
- Psychology (47)
- Biology/Biological Sciences (29)
- Neuroscience (26)
- Film/Cinema/Media Studies (20)
- Political Science and Government (19)
- Computer Science (18)
- English Language & Literature (18)

Foundations courses focus on writing, quantitative analysis, foreign language study and non-Western perspectives. In their first semester at Wheaton, all freshmen take a First Year Seminar in which they explore contemporary issues and gain academic skills needed for college-level study. The major concentration and elective courses are also central to the Wheaton Compass Curriculum, which culminates in a senior capstone experience—a thesis, research project, seminar or creative project.

=== Partnerships with other schools ===
The course selection is extended further through the college's cross-registration programs with Brown University and nine local colleges involved in SACHEM (Southeastern Association for Cooperation in Higher Education in Massachusetts). Wheaton also offers dual-degree programs, enabling its undergraduates to begin graduate-level study in studio art, communications, engineering, business, theology and optometry.

Among several study abroad opportunities unique to Wheaton is its partnership with Royal Thimphu College in Bhutan.

=== Interdisciplinary study ===
Students must take either three linked courses or two sets of two-course connections. These courses are intended to encourage students to explore and think beyond their primary academic interests. For instance, the connection entitled "Communication through Art and Mathematics" links Arts 298 (Graphic Design I) with Math 127 (Advertising Math). Although students may complete one of the numerous pre-designed connections, students are encouraged to consider proposing their own.

In 2014, the college won a $500,000 grant from the Sherman Fairchild Foundation to fund the IMAGINE Network, "an interdisciplinary, campus-wide collaboratory connecting spaces, people, resources and ideas." While much of that grant was used in development of new interdisciplinary facilities, it also supports several interdisciplinary research groups each semester, and supports students and faculty in developing the next generation of liberal arts curriculum.

=== Hands-on learning ===
Wheaton's Semester in the City program places students in internships around Boston where they work while taking two related courses for the duration of the semester, to offer a more real-world living-working-learning experience. Wheaton guarantees funding for students pursuing unpaid extracurricular experiences, including internships, research, or any suitable experiential learning opportunity. The Wheaton Institute for the Interdisciplinary Humanities (WIIH) develops and exposes programming exploring liberal arts education's weight in the ever-changing and increasingly complex "real world."

Much of this emphasis was initiated by college president Dennis M. Hanno, who took some inspiration from Babson College, where he was a Senior Vice President and Provost. One of his primary efforts in this area is WIN, short for Wheaton Innovates, which prepares students to launch social enterprises, applying liberal arts skill sets to create social change. That's included a new partnership with MassChallenge to partner students with startups, and led to a $10M commitment by the Diana Davis Spencer Foundation to continue expansion of social entrepreneurship programs starting in 2018.

=== Arts ===
In 2003, the Evelyn Danzig Haas '39 Visiting Artists Program was initiated; the program brings writers, musicians, actors, directors, dancers and artists to campus for short-term residencies to share their work through lectures, master classes, concerts and exhibitions. Arts in the City complements the visiting artists program by taking students and faculty members on trips to Boston, Providence and elsewhere to explore the arts and cultural offerings of the region.

Wheaton also has an extensive Permanent Collection of artworks which are often implemented in classes and student projects, including in some innovative learning experiences, like a semi-annual student-curated exhibition and student-driven provenance research.

College galleries often exhibit work from the Permanent Collection, but also notable visiting artist. During the 2016–2017 school year, there was a student-curated show, a show of student work, and an installation by Judy Pfaff.

=== Scholarships and fellowships ===
Wheaton prioritizes scholarships and fellowships both at the college and for its alumni. In 2016, Wheaton ranked tenth in its number of Fulbright scholars and was recognized as a top producer for 11 consecutive years. Since 2000, Wheaton students have received over 200 external scholarships, including 3 Rhodes Scholarships.

Wheaton itself provides substantial scholarships opportunities for current and prospective students. From 2004 to 2014, Wheaton added $53M in scholarships for students, and guarantees funding for internships and experiential learning opportunities. Support for the most academically curious students extends beyond financial funding to include the cohort-based May Fellows program and the Beard Hall living-learning community.

Wheaton also has a chapter of the Phi Beta Kappa Honor Society.

== Campus ==
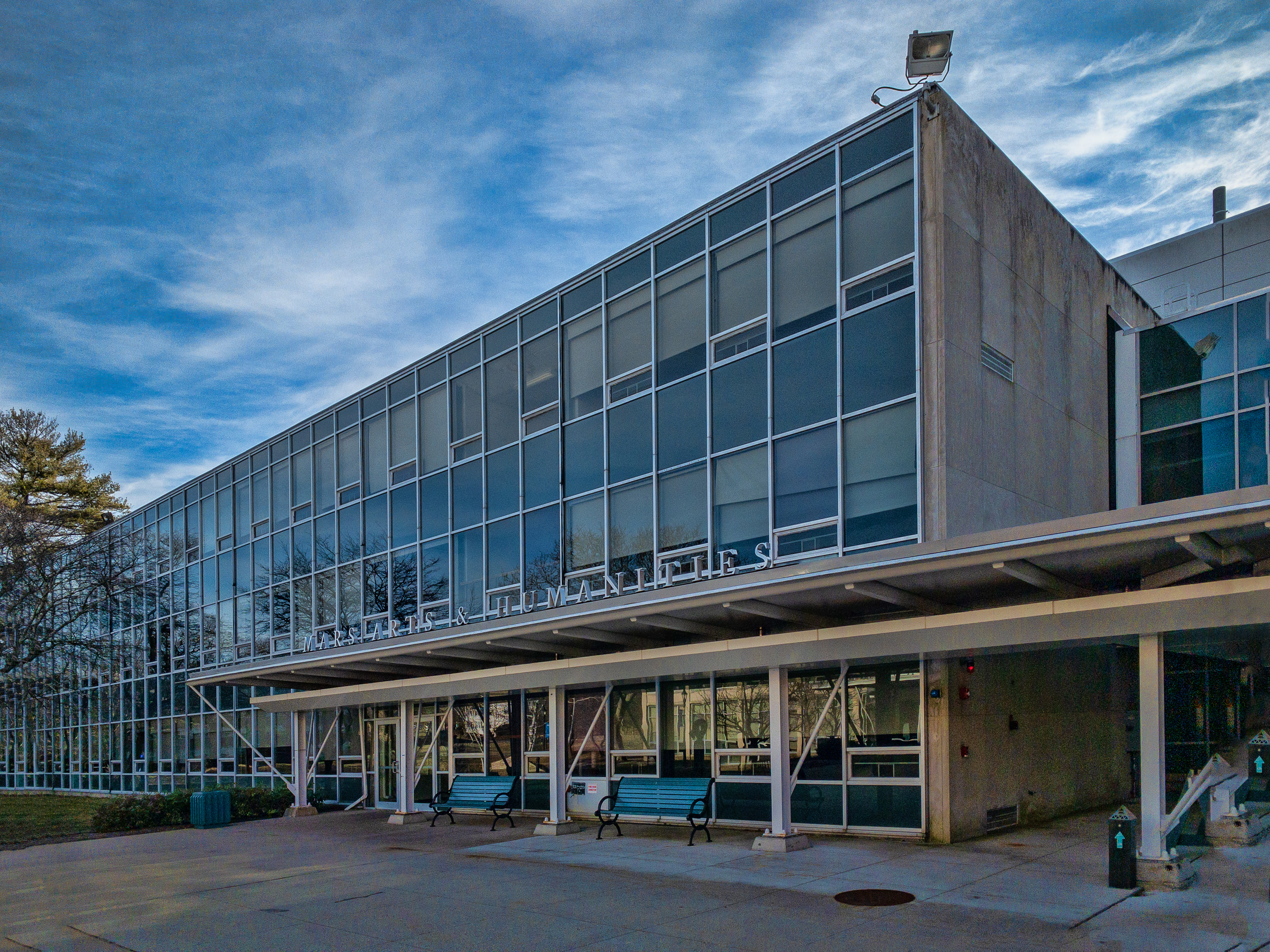
Mars Arts & Humanities

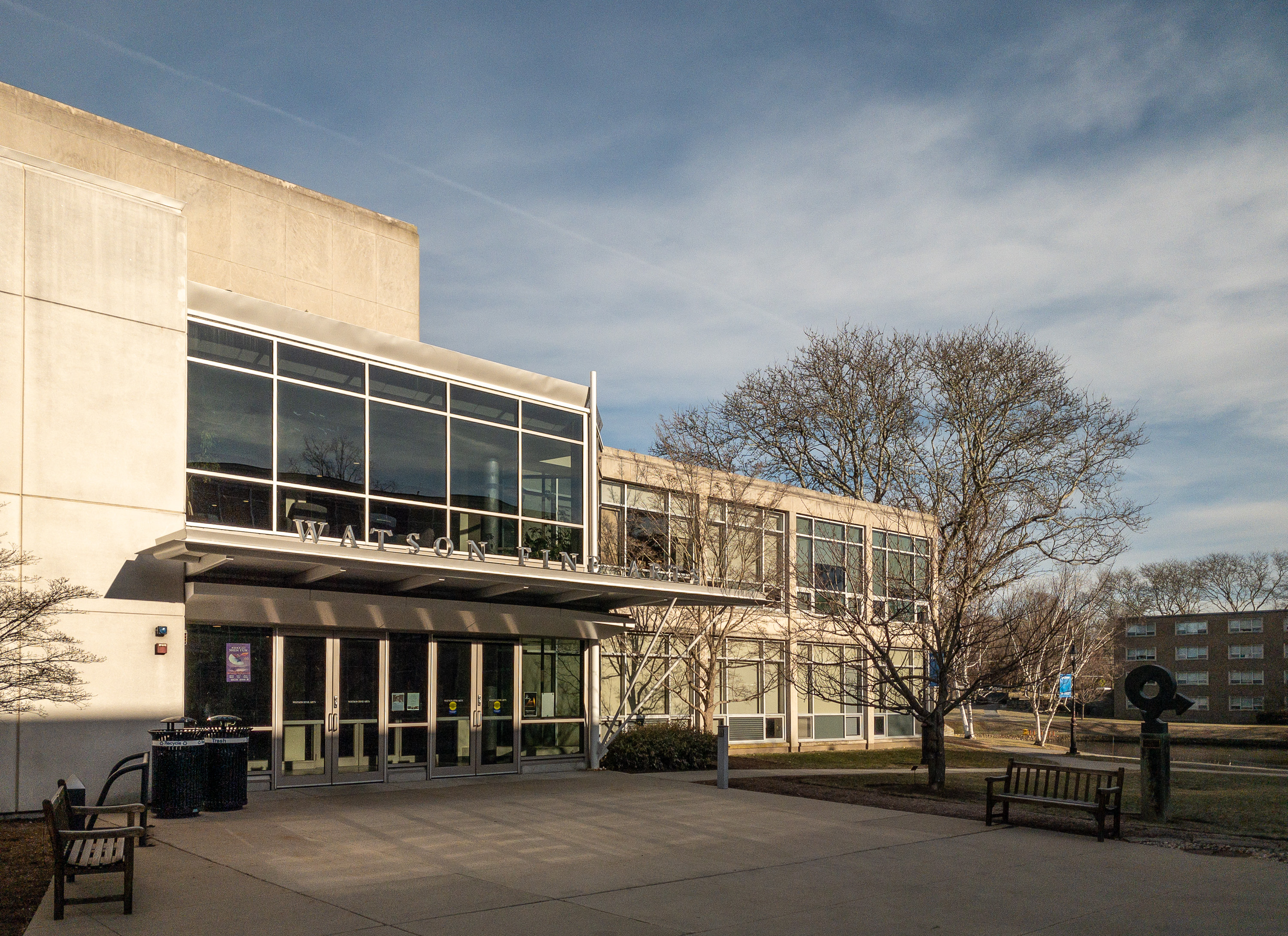
Watson Fine Arts Center

=== Architecture ===
Austin House, designed by The Architects Collaborative, sits at the edge of campus and serves as housing for guest speakers, artists, etc. It won Architectural Record's "House of the Year" in 1962, and remains an important example of mid-century modernism.

In 1938, Wheaton sponsored a competition to build a new arts center, cosponsored by Museum of Modern Art and Architectural Forum. They fielded proposals from some of the most famous architects of that era, including Louis Kahn and Walter Gropius, the latter of which took second prize. First prize went to two relatively unknown architects, Caleb Hornbostel and Richard Bennett, and while never actually built, accelerated the college's embrace of modernist architecture. In 1962, Watson Fine Arts was finally built in the Brutalist International Style.

=== Student living ===
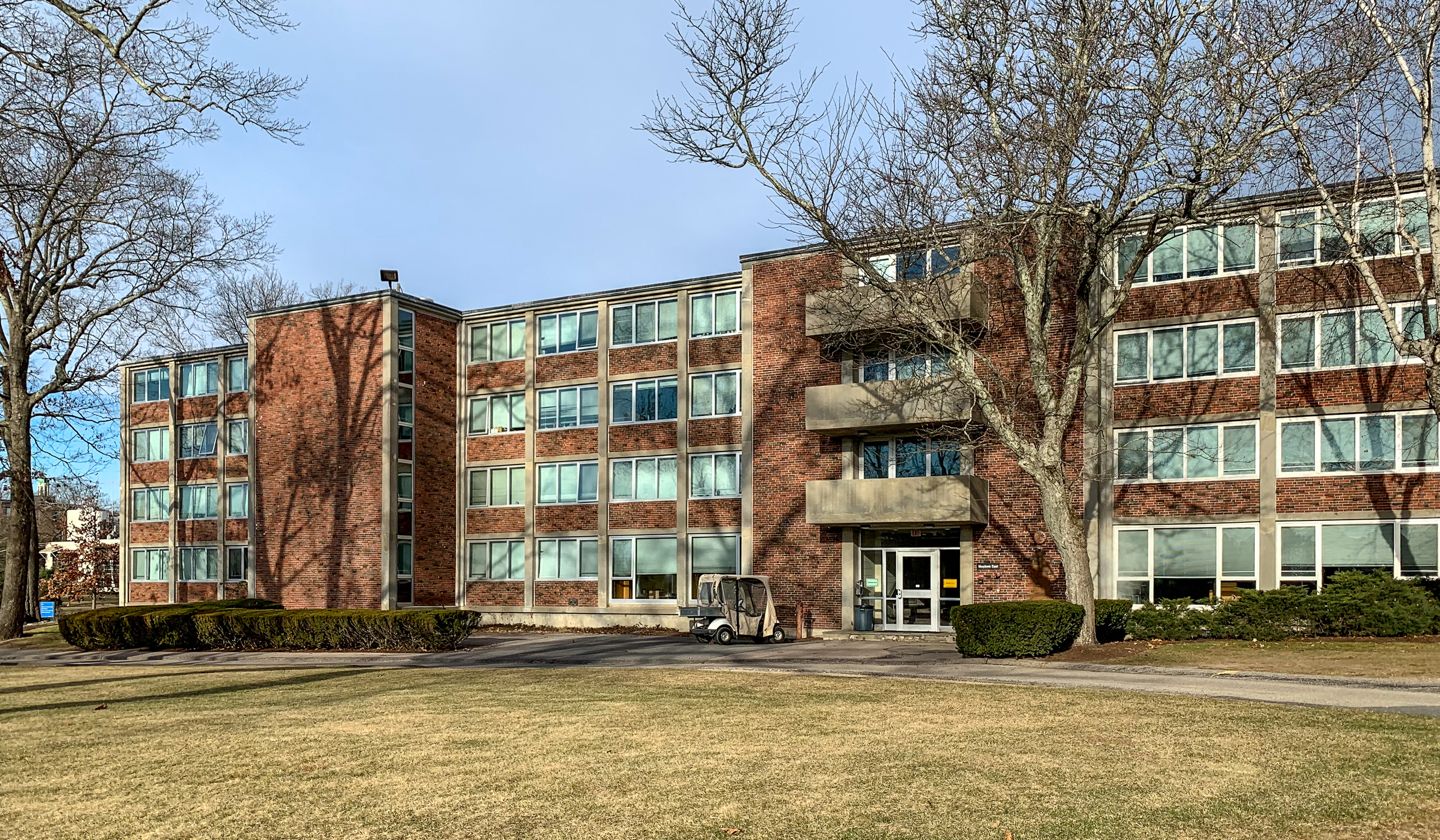
Meadows East residence hall, built in 1964.

Wheaton students live in a variety of ways. There are 18 traditional residence halls; some, like Meadows and Beard, were built in the 2000s, while others date back to the late 1800s. Most have single and double rooms, with two buildings dedicated to suites of 3–6 people.

There's also a history of "Theme Houses," bringing together a number of students with shared interests or purpose. In the 2017–2018 year, there were 17 theme houses on campus. They range from Farm House, which is an active farm, to the United World College Davis House, to the Feminist Perspective House.

=== Recent facilities developments ===
In 2011, Wheaton completed its new Mars Science Center, a Gold LEED certified building housing the majority of the schools science classrooms and research (including greenhouses and observatory). It's also connected by underground passages to the old science center and library.

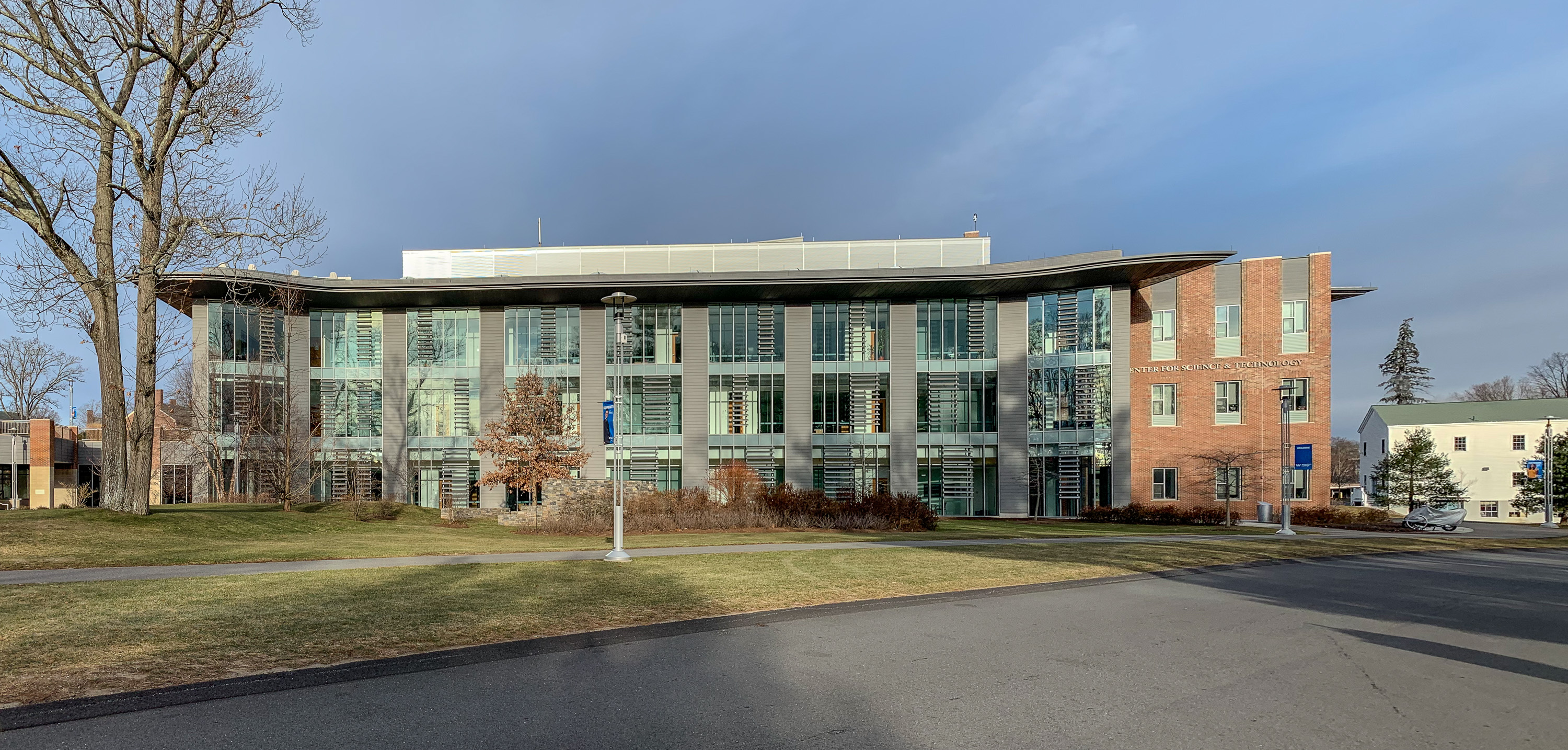
Mars Center for Science and Technology

Wheaton's 2014 Sherman Fairchild Foundation grant supported development of a network of interdisciplinary creative spaces around campus, including a Makerspace called Lab 213 (housing 3D printers, Laser cutters, five-axis CNC milling equipment, electronics workspace), the HATCH Lab (digital classroom with virtual reality and eye tracking tools for digital humanities), and a Fiberspace (with digital jacquard loom, sewing machines, and other fibers and textiles tools).

Also included in that network are Arts spaces like the Wheaton Sculpture Studio (wood and metal working, ceramics, molding and casting, etc.), WCCS Student-run recording studio, Machine Shop for precision fabrication, and an experimental theater and dance studio.

The school has been pursuing infrastructure projects outside academics, too. In 2016, Wheaton renovated its dining halls, including Emerson Dining Hall, the Hood Cafe, and the Davis Spencer Cafe. They also rebuilt Chase Dining Hall. The next year, they erected solar panels on the roof of the old science center and in fields nearby.

The most recent development came in August 2019 with the addition of Pine Hall. With an increasing volume in the number of freshmen accepted every year, it was decided that a new residence hall needed to be built. Pine Hall is a designated wellness community and is named after Pine Street, which is the street the residence hall sits on. It can house 178 students in both single- and double-style rooms. It is the first college residence in the state of Massachusetts to meet Passive House standards, and was designed to use 70% less energy than buildings built to current building codes. It is one of the only residence halls on the campus built with air conditioning. It was also designed to be a community space, with a study lounge available to the entire student body and fire pits with outdoor seating on the patio.

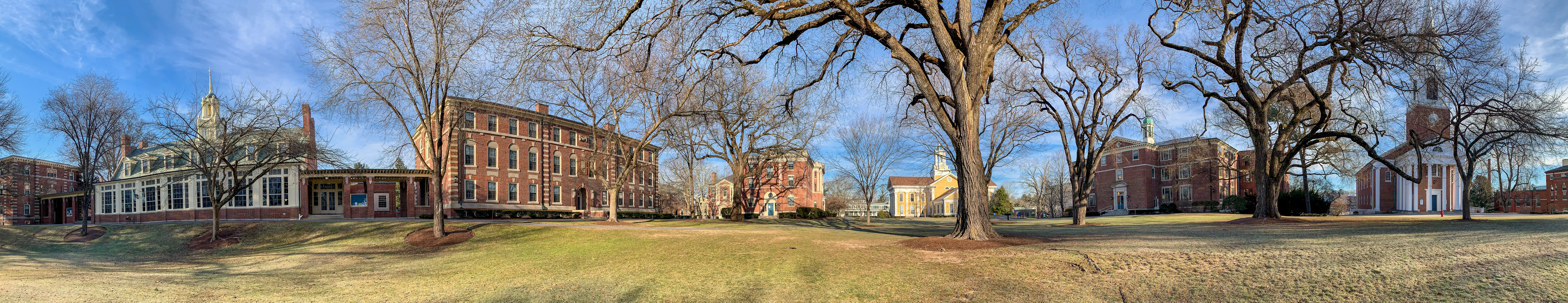
Left to right: Emerson Hall, Larcom Hall, Park Hall, Mary Lyon Hall, Knapton Hall, Cole Chapel.

== Athletics ==
Wheaton fields 21 varsity NCAA Division III teams, nine for men and 12 for women, in addition to 14 club sports programs and a variety of intramural activities.

== Reputation ==
In 2018, The Wall Street Journal and Times Higher Education ranked Wheaton among the Top 40 U.S. Colleges for liberal arts. For 2015, U.S. News & World Report ranked it 69th in Best National Liberal Arts Colleges, and top 50 by high school counselor rankings. Kiplinger notes Wheaton as a "Best Value School", and College Raptor and College Recruiter independently identify Wheaton as a "hidden gem." The Princeton Review also recognizes Wheaton as a standout Northeastern college, one of the 373 best colleges in the United States and among the Top 200 Colleges That Pay You Back. Since 2000, over 250 prestigious scholarships have gone to Wheaton students, including 3 Rhodes Scholarships. In 2011 Newsweek/The Daily Beast placed Wheaton at number 19 of 25 in their "Braniacs" schools ranking.

Niche ranked Wheaton sixth for most liberal colleges in 2018. College leadership has spoken out at numerous occasions against the Trump presidency, in favor of remaining signed on to the Paris Climate Accord and establishing a scholarship for refugees adversely affected by Trump's immigration policies. The school is not to be confused with the Christian liberal arts college Wheaton College (Illinois).

== Publications and media ==
- Wheaton Magazine: College magazine
- The Wheaton Wire: Weekly student newspaper
- Nike: college yearbook
- Rushlight: Student arts & literary magazine since 1855
- Babe Lincoln: semesterly magazine
- The Underwire: Alternative/underground newspaper (2005–2006)
- WCCS: free-format student-run radio station

== Films ==
The following films have been filmed, at least in part, on the Wheaton campus or feature Wheaton students.

- Soul Man (1986)
- Metropolitan (1990)
- Prozac Nation (2001)
- Legally Blonde (2001)
- Mona Lisa Smile (2003)
- Professor Marston and the Wonder Women (2017)
- Don't Look Up (2021)
- Challengers (2024)

== Notable people ==
=== Alumni ===
Notable Wheaton College alumni include:

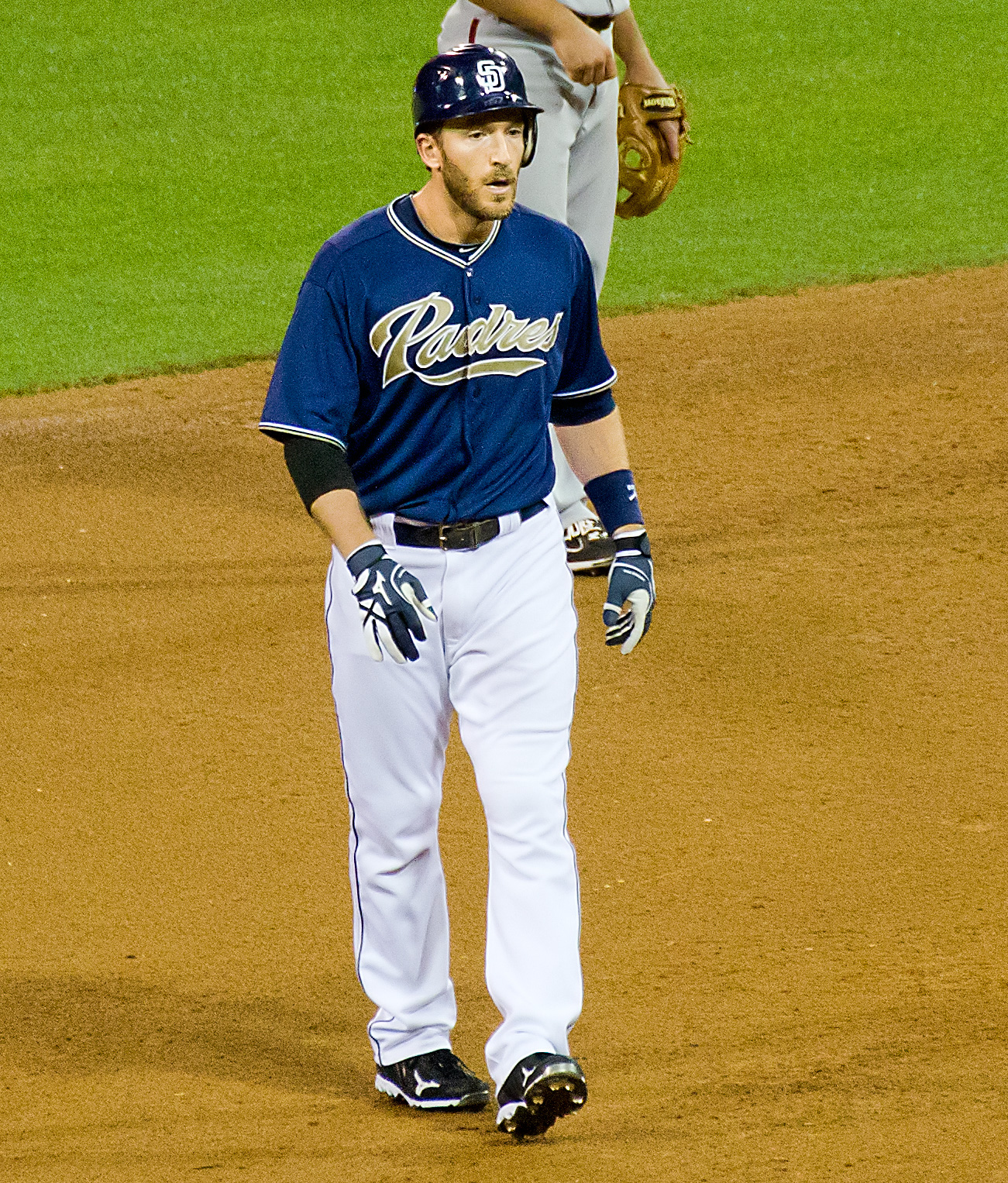
Chris Denorfia, baseball player in Major League Baseball

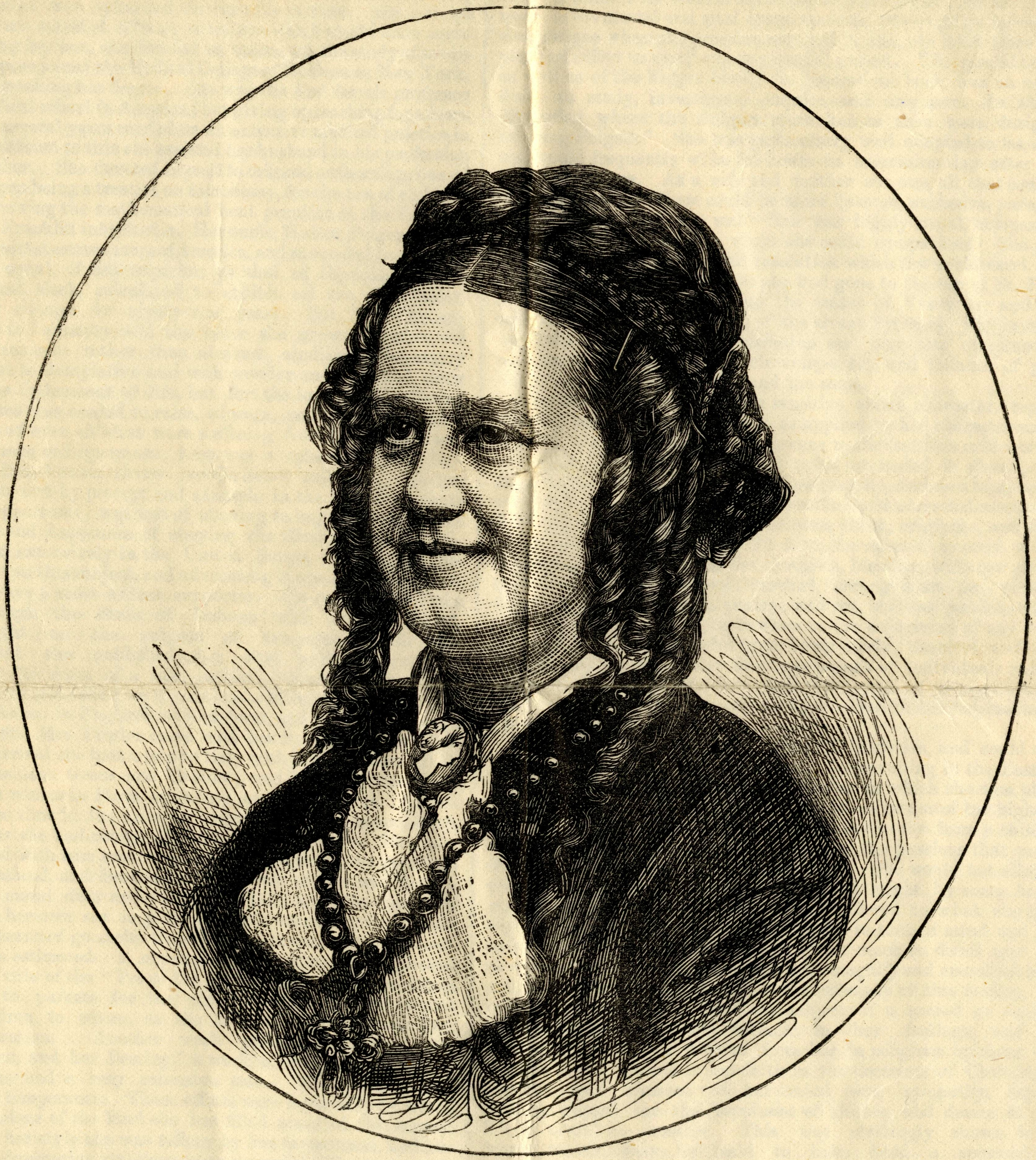
Lydia Folger Fowler, second American woman to earn a medical degree

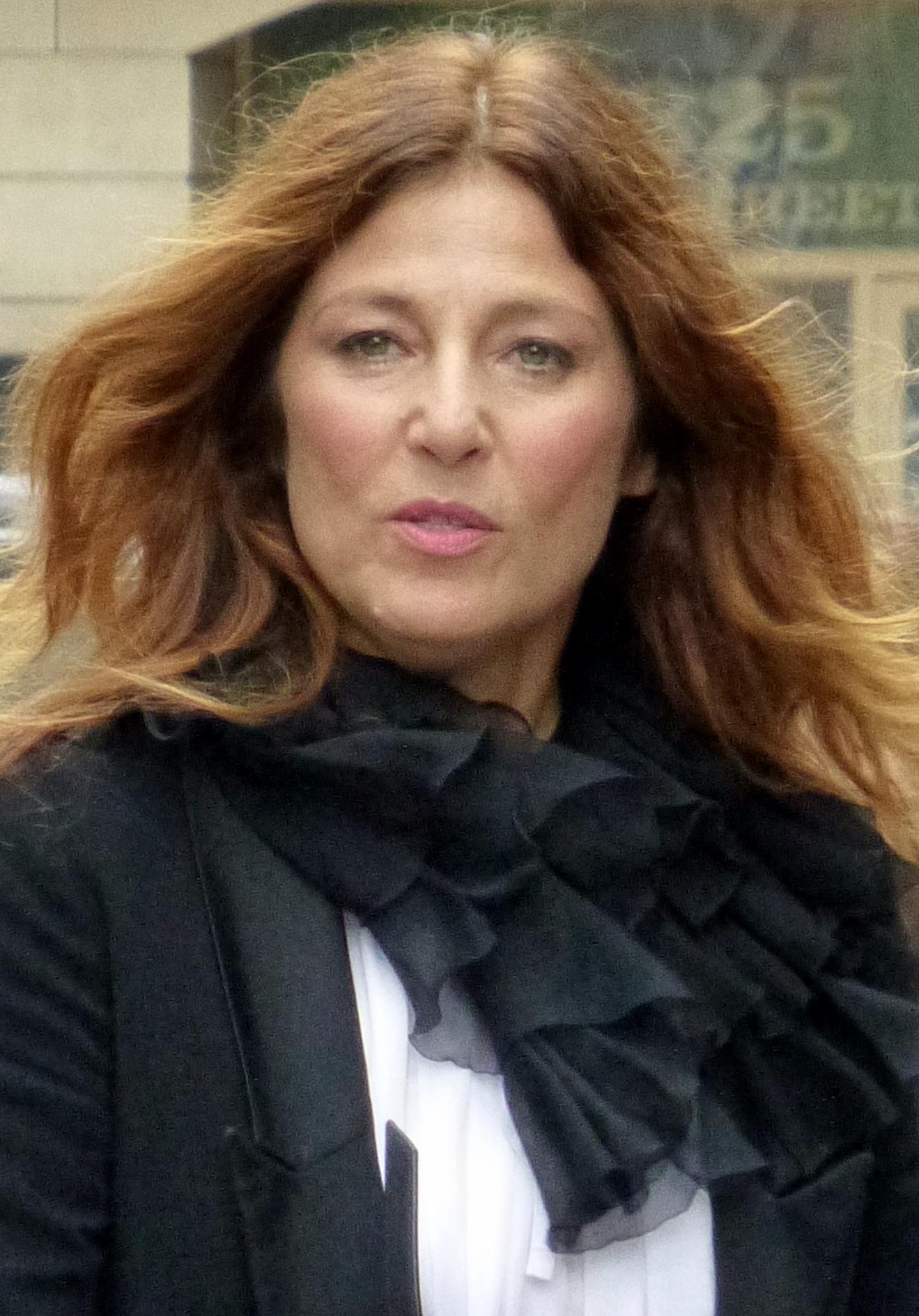
Catherine Keener, actress nominated for an Academy Award

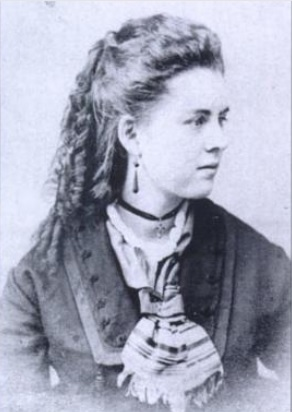
Eleanor Norcross, founder of the Fitchburg Art Museum

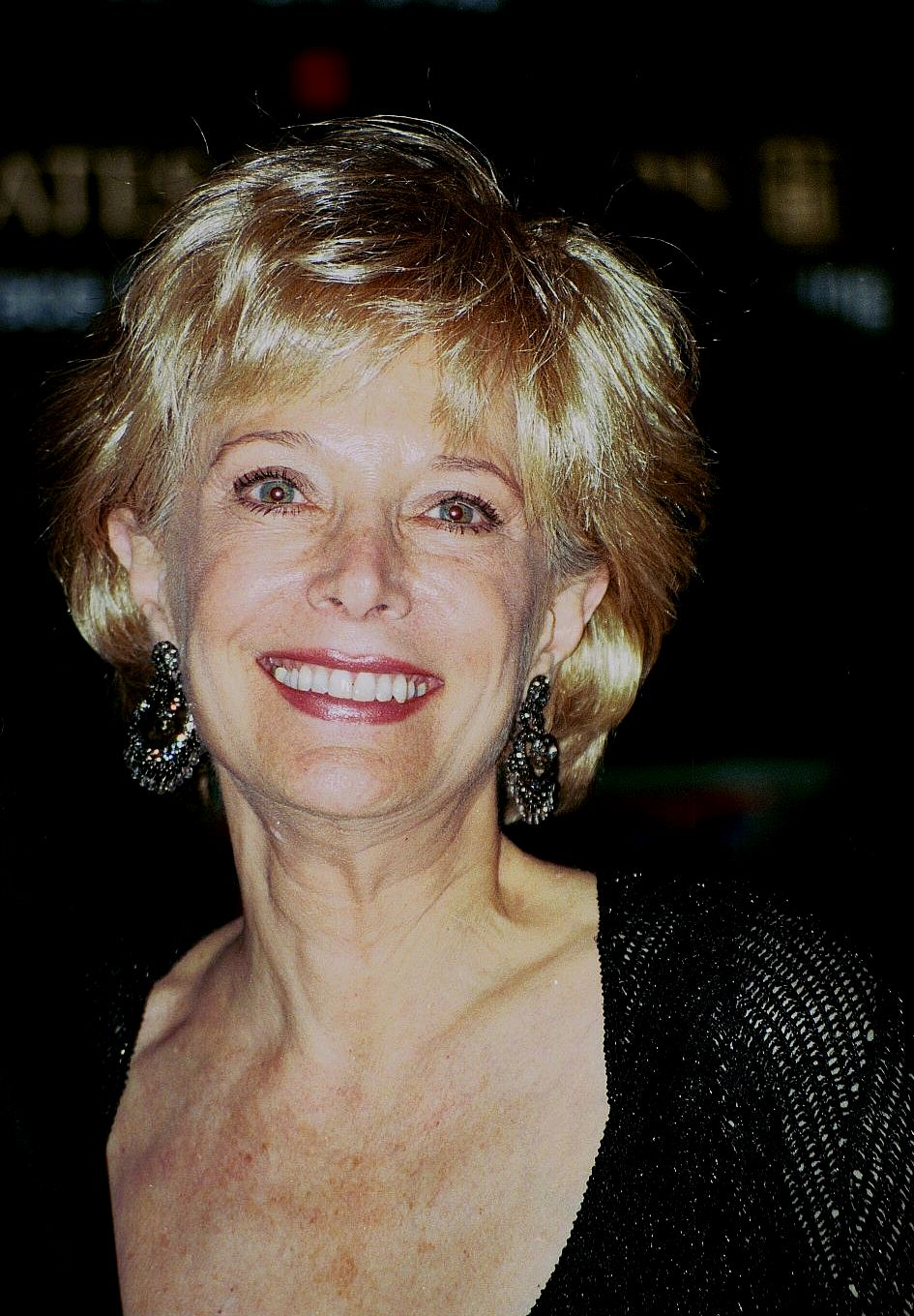
Lesley Stahl, news reporter for 60 Minutes and CBS News

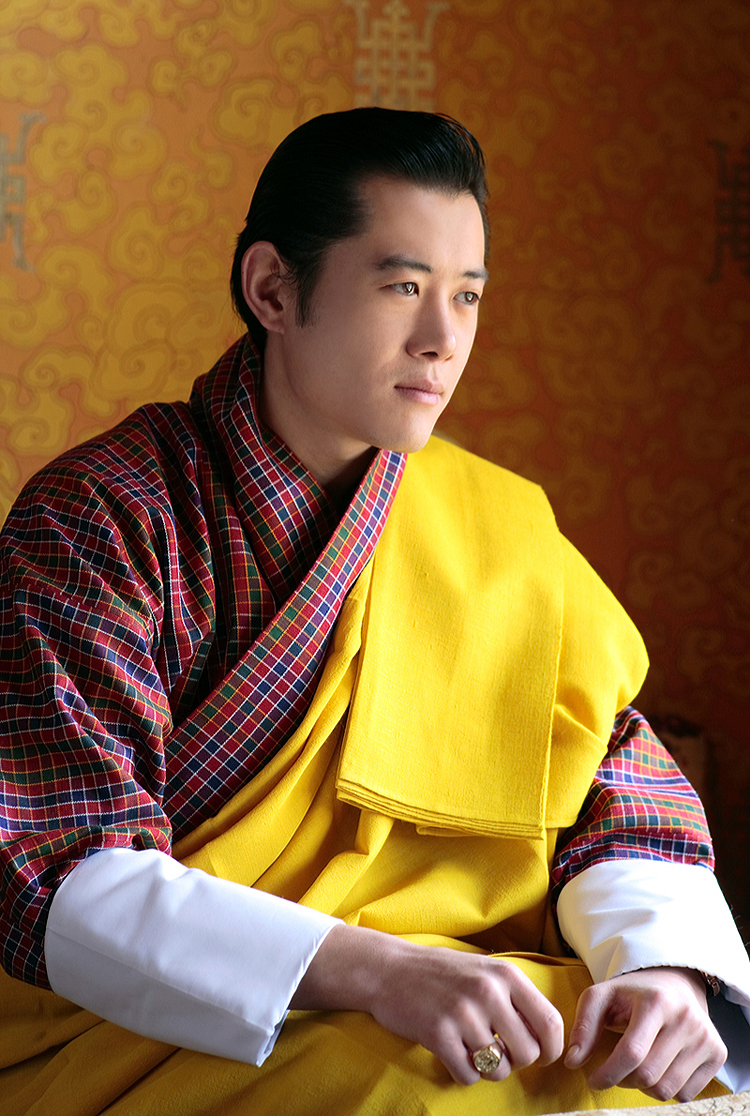
Jigme Khesar Namgyel Wangchuck, King of Bhutan

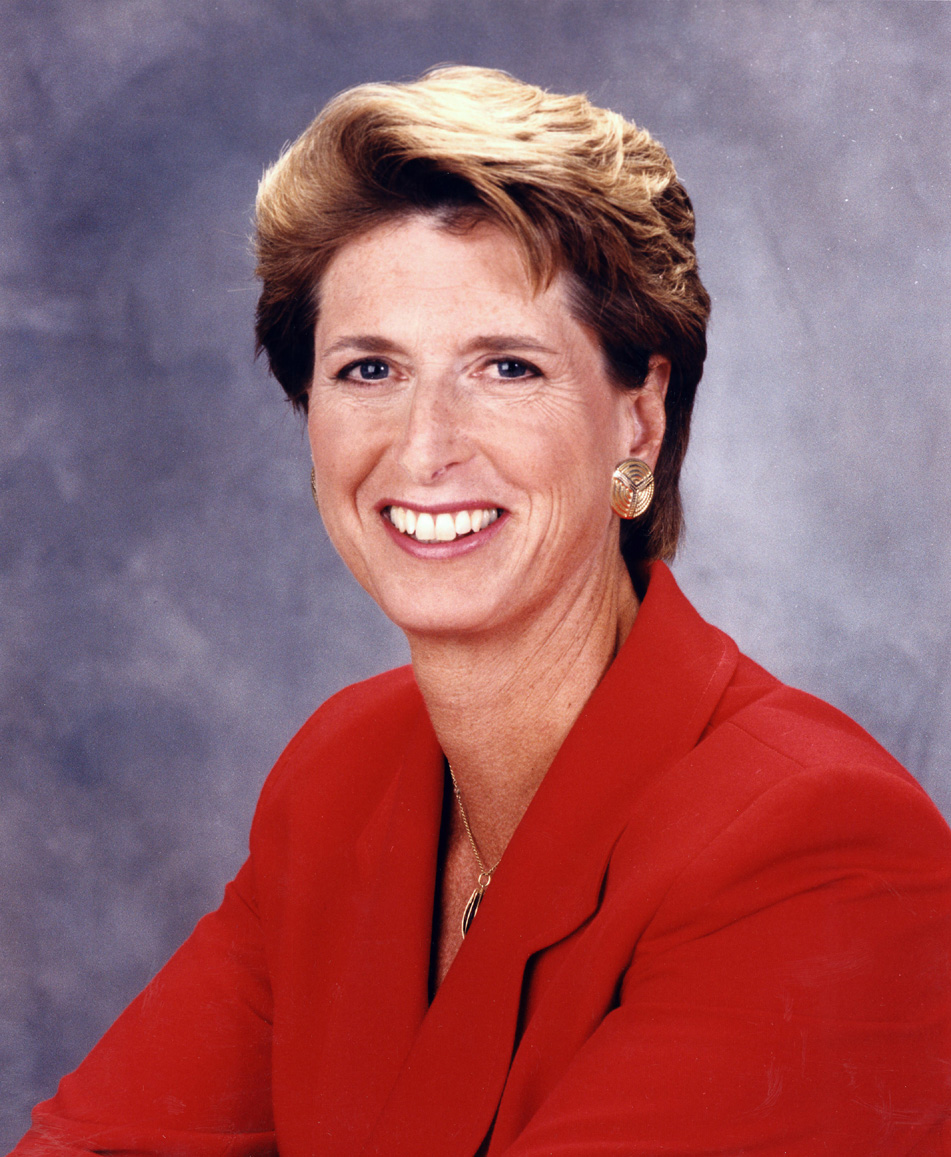
Christine Todd Whitman, 50th Governor of New Jersey

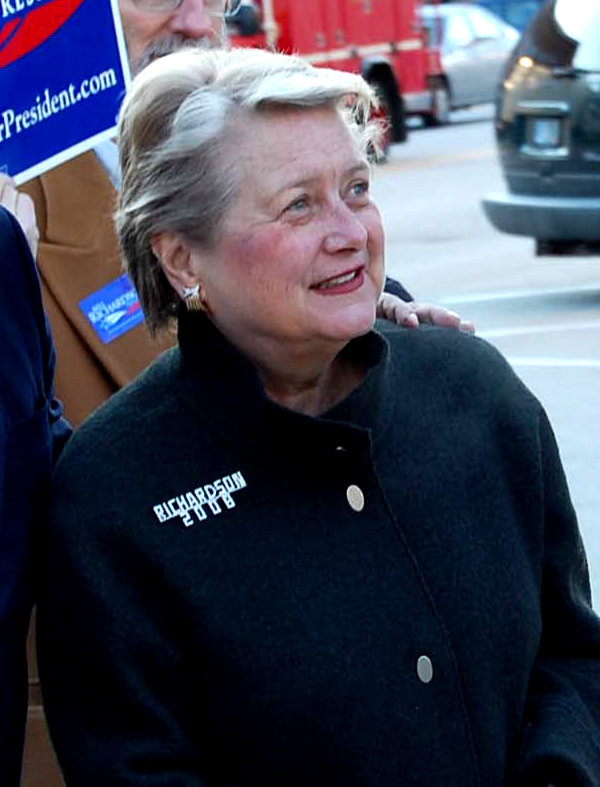
Barbara Richardson, First Lady of New Mexico

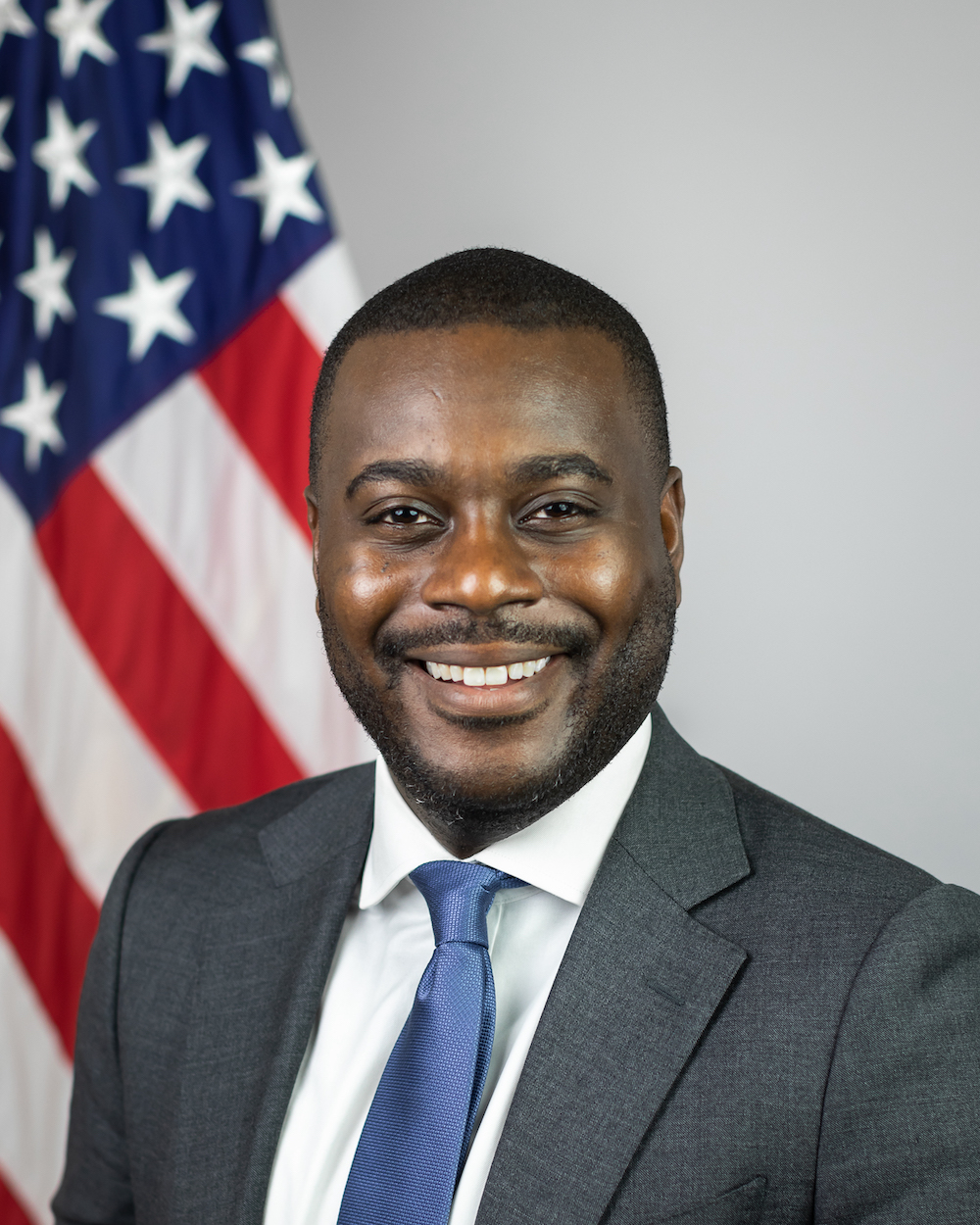
Gabe Amo, U.S. congressman

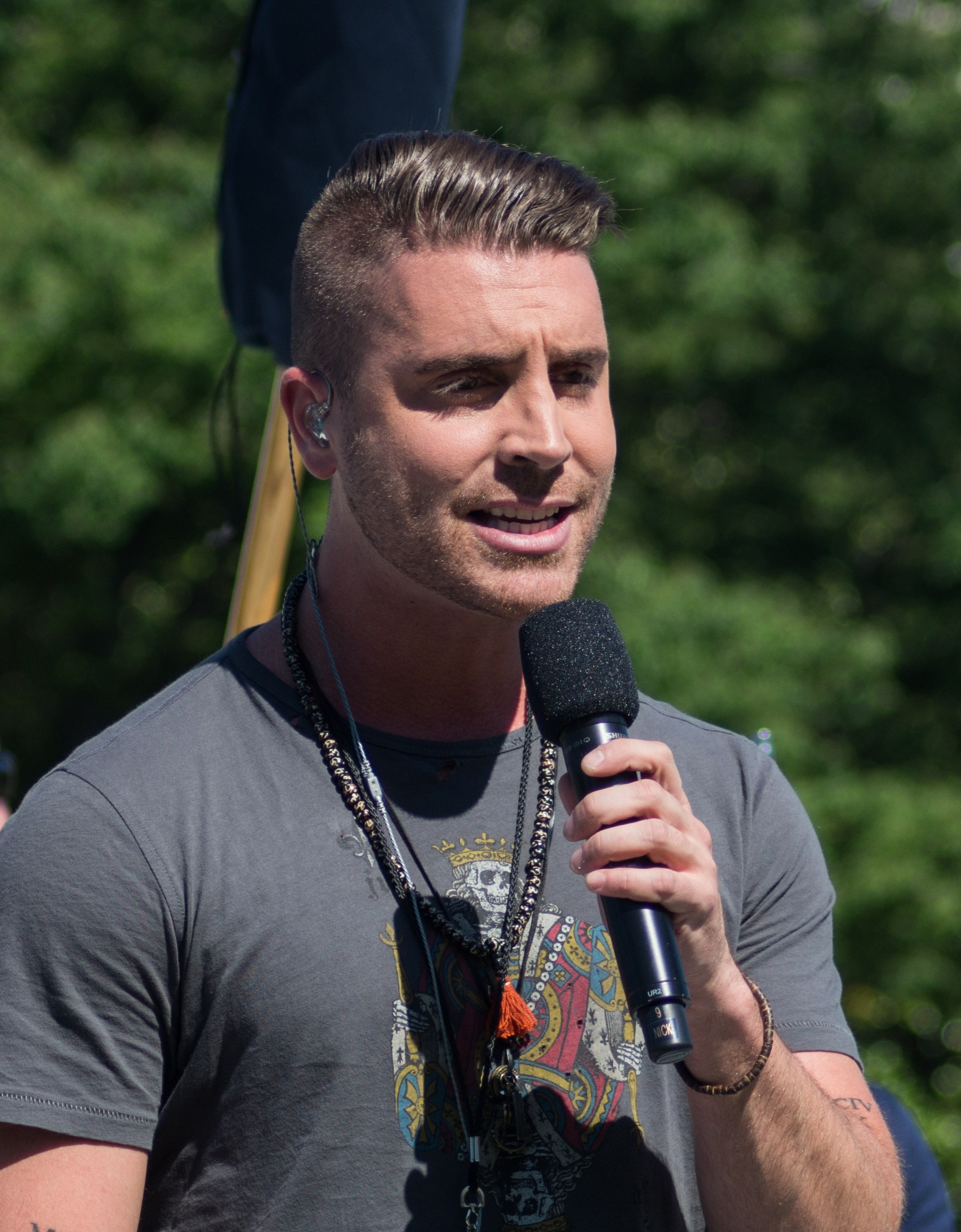
Nick Fradiani, winner of American Idol

=== Faculty ===
- Susanne Woods, literary scholar and provost of Wheaton College (1999–2006)

== See also ==
- Female seminary
- Women's education in the United States
