= Michaele Whelan =

American literary scholar and academic administrator

9th President of Wheaton College
- Incumbent
- Assumed office January 1, 2022
- Preceded by: Dennis M. Hanno

Personal details
- Education: Cornell University; Harvard University

Michaele Whelan is an American literary scholar and academic administrator serving as the ninth president of Wheaton College since 2022. She was the provost and vice president of academic affairs at Emerson College from 2013 to 2021.

== Life ==
Whelan was born to Teresa and Robert J. Whelan the eldest of five children. Her mother was a registered nurse who taught psychiatric nursing at McLean Hospital. Her father was a professor of German literature and language. She was raised in Weston, Massachusetts. Whelan earned a B.A., summa cum laude, in English and American literature from Cornell University. She earned a Ph.D. in English and American literature from Harvard University. Her 1991 dissertation was titled, Hawkes's Mindfield: Narratives of Perversion.

Whelan is an academic of modern and postmodern American literature. In 1998, she authored a book on the works of novelist John Hawkes. Whelan taught courses at the Pennsylvania State University. She was the assistant director of undergraduate studies in the department of English and American literature at Harvard College. Whelan was the associate dean of academic planning and innovation in the Tufts University School of Arts and Sciences and Tufts University School of Engineering. She worked at Brandeis University as its vice provost for academic affairs. In 2010, she authored a book titled, Travel Implies Destination.

Whelan joined Emerson College in 2013 as its provost and vice president for academic affairs. Whelan alongside the vice president of enrollment, Ruthanne Madsen, managed the creation of the business of creative enterprises, sports communication, and comedic arts majors. Following the merger with Marlboro College in 2020, she oversaw the creation and implementation of the Marlboro Institute for Liberal Arts and Interdisciplinary Studies. She was succeeded by interim provost Jan Roberts-Breslin on November 13, 2021. In September 2021, Whelan was selected to succeed Dennis M. Hanno as the ninth president of Wheaton College. She assumed the role on January 1, 2022.

== Selected works ==
- Whelan, Michaele (1998). Navigating the Minefield: Hawkes's Narratives of Perversion. Peter Lang. ISBN 978-0-8204-3657-9.
- Whelan, Michaele (2010). Travel Implies Destination. Aracne. ISBN 978-88-548-2843-8.
