= Busswil =

There are several municipalities and communities have the name Busswil in Switzerland:

- Busswil bei Büren, in the Canton of Bern (pop: 1,905)
- Busswil bei Melchnau, in the Canton of Bern (pop: 194)
- Busswil TG, in the Canton of Thurgau
