= Untersteckholz =

- Former municipality
- Flag Coat of arms
- Location of Untersteckholz
- Location within Switzerland Location within Canton of Bern
- Coordinates: 47°13′N 7°51′E
- Country: Switzerland
- Canton: Bern
- District: Aarwangen

Area
  - Total: 2.8 km^{2} (1.1 sq mi)
- Elevation: 492 m (1,614 ft)

Population (December 2020)
  - Total: 166
  - Density: 59/km^{2} (150/sq mi)
- Time zone: UTC+01:00 (CET)
  - Summer (DST): UTC+02:00 (CEST)
- Postal code: 4916
- SFOS number: 343
- ISO 3166 code: CH-BE
- Surrounded by: Busswil bei Melchnau, Langenthal, Melchnau, Obersteckholz, Pfaffnau (LU), Roggwil
- Website: SFSO statistics

Untersteckholz was a municipality in the district of Aarwangen in the canton of Bern in Switzerland. On 1 January 2010, Untersteckholz merged into Langenthal.

== Geography ==
Before the merger, Untersteckholz had an area, as of 2009, of 2.83 km^{2} (1.09 sq mi). This area uses 2.09 km^{2} (0.81 sq mi) or 73.9% for agricultural purposes, while 0.59 km^{2} (0.23 sq mi) or 20.8% is forested. Of the remaining land, 0.16 km^{2} (0.062 sq mi) or 5.7% is settled (buildings or roads).

Housing and buildings comprised 2.1% of the built-up area, and transportation infrastructure comprised 3.2%. 17.7% of the land area is heavily forested, and 3.2% is covered with orchards or small clusters of trees. Of the agricultural land, 56.5% is used for growing crops and 14.1% is pastures, while 3.2% is used for orchards or vine crops.

== Demographics ==
Untersteckholz has a population of 166 (as of 31 December 2020). As of 2007, 1.2% of the population comprised foreign nationals. Over the last 10 years, the population has grown at a rate of 5.8%. Most of the population (as of 2000) speaks German (97.6%), with Rhaeto-romance being the second most common (0.6%) and Russian being third (0.6%).

In the 2007 election, the most popular party was the SVP, which received 65.3% of the vote. The following three most popular parties were the FDP (11.3%), the Green Party (11.1%) and the local small left-wing parties (5.9%).

The age distribution of the population (as of 2000) is that children and teenagers (0–19 years old) make up 18.6% of the population, while adults (20–64 years old) make up 61.7%, and seniors (over 64 years old) make up 19.8%. In Untersteckholz, about 79.7% of the population (between the ages of 25 and 64) have completed either non-mandatory upper secondary education or additional higher education (either a university or a Fachhochschule).

Untersteckholz has an unemployment rate of 0.17%. As of 2005, 58 people were employed in the primary economic sector, and about 14 businesses were involved in this sector. 16 people are employed in the secondary sector, and there are 5 businesses in this sector. 11 people are employed in the tertiary sector, with 2 businesses in this sector.
