= Obersteckholz =

- Former municipality
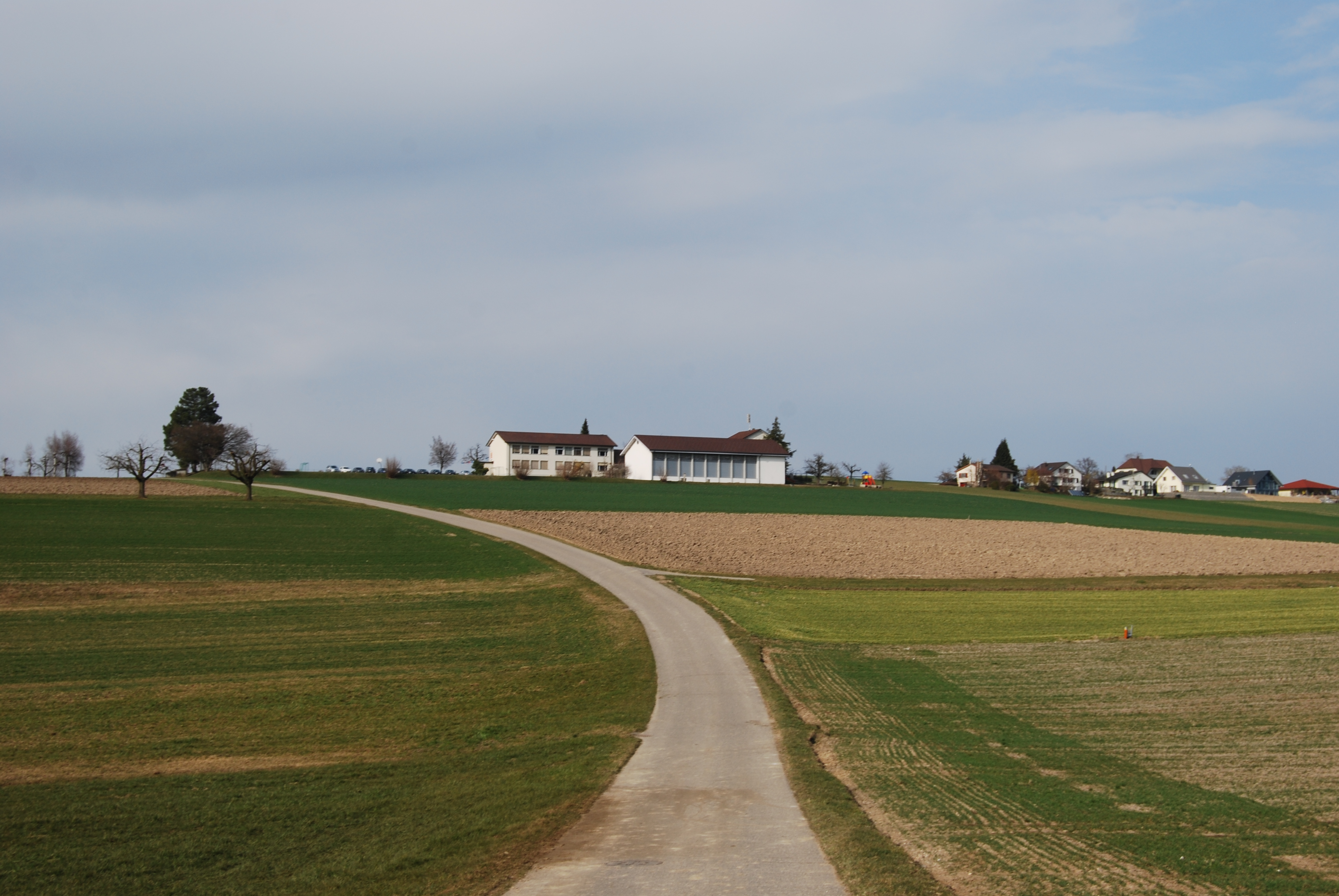

- Flag Coat of arms
- Location of Obersteckholz
- Location within Switzerland Location within Canton of Bern
- Coordinates: 47°12′N 7°49′E
- Country: Switzerland
- Canton: Bern
- District: Oberaargau

Area
  - Total: 3.9 km^{2} (1.5 sq mi)
- Elevation: 525 m (1,722 ft)

Population (November 2019)
  - Total: 422
  - Density: 110/km^{2} (280/sq mi)
- Time zone: UTC+01:00 (CET)
  - Summer (DST): UTC+02:00 (CEST)
- Postal code: 4924
- SFOS number: none
- ISO 3166 code: CH-BE
- Surrounded by: Busswil bei Melchnau, Langenthal, Lotzwil, Untersteckholz
- Website: SFSO statistics

Obersteckholz is a former municipality in the Oberaargau administrative district in the canton of Bern in Switzerland. On 1 January 2021 the former municipality of Obersteckholz merged into Langenthal.

== History ==
Obersteckholz is first mentioned in 1255 as Stechcholz.

Obersteckholz was the property of the Baron of Langenstein. In 1194, he founded St. Urban's Abbey and granted the village to the Abbey as part of its endowment. It was part of the Abbey's court of Langenthal until 1406 when it became part of the Bernese bailiwick of Wangen. Following the 1798 French invasion it became part of the district of Langenthal under the Helvetic Republic. In 1803, after the collapse of the Republic, it became part of the Aarwangen District. The village became an independent municipality in 1831. Until 1790 and again after 1975 Obersteckholz and Untersteckholz shared a single school district.

During the 18th and 19th century, small cottage industries such as linen weaving and straw plaiting began to supplement agriculture in the local economy. Today there are several small businesses in the village but about 71% of the working adults commute to jobs outside the municipality.

== Geography ==
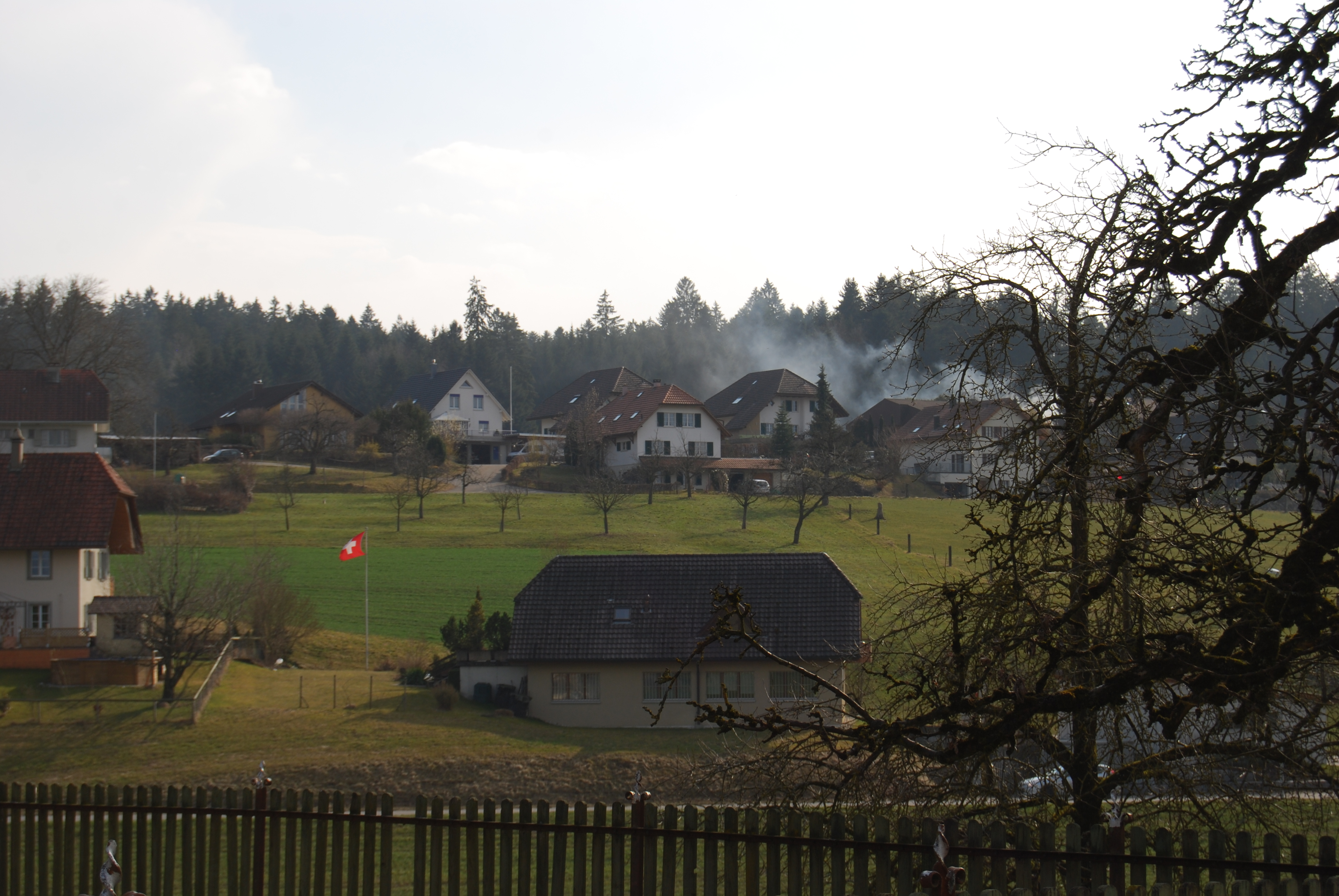
View of Obersteckholz village and surrounding hills

Obersteckholz had an area of 3.91 km^{2} (1.51 sq mi). Of this area, 2.6 km^{2} (1.0 mi^{2}) or 66.7% is used for agricultural purposes, while 1.09 km^{2} (0.42 mi^{2}) or 27.9% is forested. Of the rest of the land, 0.22 km^{2} (0.085 mi^{2}) or 5.6% is settled (buildings or roads).

Of the built up area, housing and buildings made up 4.1% and transportation infrastructure made up 1.3%. Out of the forested land, all of the forested land area is covered with heavy forests. Of the agricultural land, 44.4% is used for growing crops and 17.9% is pastures, while 4.4% is used for orchards or vine crops.

The former municipality consists of the village of Obersteckholz and the hamlets of Habkerig, Kleben, Wald, Herrengasse and Hübeli as well as scattered farm houses.

On 31 December 2009 Amtsbezirk Aarwangen, the municipality's former district, was dissolved. On the following day, 1 January 2010, it joined the newly created Verwaltungskreis Oberaargau.

== Coat of arms ==
The blazon of the municipal coat of arms is Argent a Fir Tree Vert fructed and trunked Gules growing from a Mount of the last.

== Demographics ==
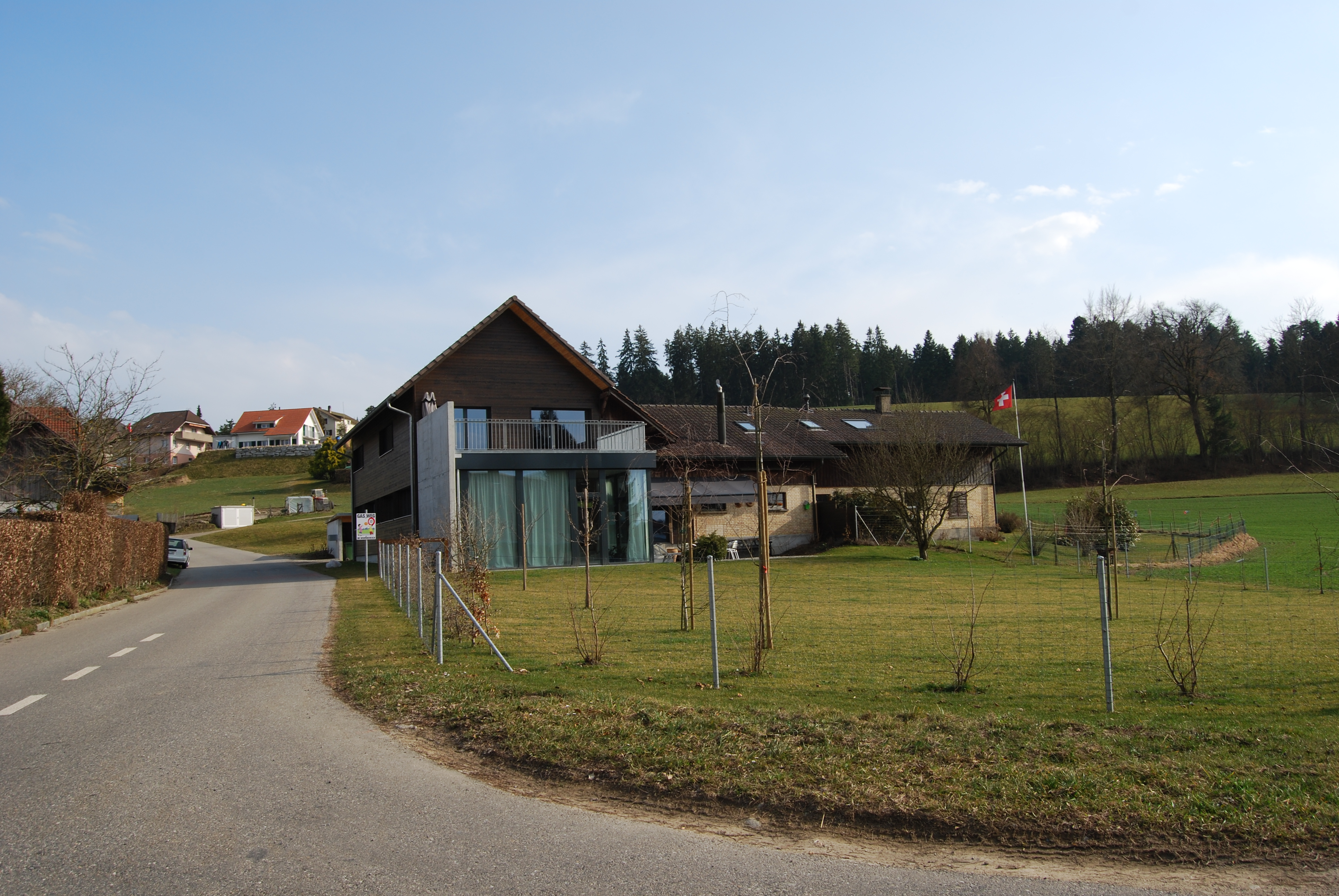
Obersteckholz village

Obersteckholz has a population (as of 2019) of 422. As of 2010, 0.7% of the population are resident foreign nationals. Over the last 10 years (2000-2010) the population has changed at a rate of 0.7%. Migration accounted for -1.5%, while births and deaths accounted for -1.2%.

Most of the population (as of 2000) speaks German (392 or 98.5%) as their first language.

As of 2008, the population was 49.9% male and 50.1% female. The population was made up of 201 Swiss men (49.4% of the population) and 2 (0.5%) non-Swiss men. There were 203 Swiss women (49.9%) and 1 (0.2%) non-Swiss women. Of the population in the municipality, 160 or about 40.2% were born in Obersteckholz and lived there in 2000. There were 148 or 37.2% who were born in the same canton, while 69 or 17.3% were born somewhere else in Switzerland, and 11 or 2.8% were born outside of Switzerland.

As of 2010, children and teenagers (0–19 years old) make up 21.1% of the population, while adults (20–64 years old) make up 57.5% and seniors (over 64 years old) make up 21.4%.

As of 2000, there were 152 people who were single and never married in the municipality. There were 202 married individuals, 33 widows or widowers and 11 individuals who are divorced.

As of 2000, there were 47 households that consist of only one person and 19 households with five or more people. In 2000, a total of 161 apartments (92.0% of the total) were permanently occupied, while 6 apartments (3.4%) were seasonally occupied and 8 apartments (4.6%) were empty. As of 2010, the construction rate of new housing units was 4.9 new units per 1000 residents. The vacancy rate for the municipality, in 2011, was 0.53%.

The historical population is given in the following chart:

== Politics ==
In the 2011 federal election the most popular party was the SVP which received 53.3% of the vote. The next three most popular parties were the BDP Party (19.3%), the SPS (5.7%) and the EVP Party (5.3%). In the federal election, a total of 198 votes were cast, and the voter turnout was 58.1%.

== Economy ==
As of 2011, Obersteckholz had an unemployment rate of 1.15%. As of 2008, there were a total of 96 people employed in the municipality. Of these, there were 63 people employed in the primary economic sector and about 21 businesses involved in this sector. 16 people were employed in the secondary sector and there were 6 businesses in this sector. 17 people were employed in the tertiary sector, with 5 businesses in this sector.

In 2008 there were a total of 62 full-time equivalent jobs. The number of jobs in the primary sector was 36, all of which were in agriculture. The number of jobs in the secondary sector was 14 of which 9 or (64.3%) were in manufacturing and 5 (35.7%) were in construction. The number of jobs in the tertiary sector was 12. In the tertiary sector; 1 was in the sale or repair of motor vehicles, 6 were in the movement and storage of goods, 1 was a technical professional or scientist, 3 were in education.

In 2000, there were 16 workers who commuted into the municipality and 153 workers who commuted away. The municipality is a net exporter of workers, with about 9.6 workers leaving the municipality for every one entering. Of the working population, 8.3% used public transportation to get to work, and 57.9% used a private car.

== Religion ==
From the 2000 census, 34 or 8.5% were Roman Catholic, while 324 or 81.4% belonged to the Swiss Reformed Church. Of the rest of the population, there were 27 individuals (or about 6.78% of the population) who belonged to another Christian church. There was 1 individual who was Islamic and 1 who was Buddhist. 20 (or about 5.03% of the population) belonged to no church, are agnostic or atheist, and 3 individuals (or about 0.75% of the population) did not answer the question.

== Education ==
In Obersteckholz about 170 or (42.7%) of the population have completed non-mandatory upper secondary education, and 43 or (10.8%) have completed additional higher education (either university or a Fachhochschule). Of the 43 who completed tertiary schooling, 69.8% were Swiss men, 27.9% were Swiss women.

The Canton of Bern school system provides one year of non-obligatory Kindergarten, followed by six years of Primary school. This is followed by three years of obligatory lower Secondary school where the students are separated according to ability and aptitude. Following the lower Secondary students may attend additional schooling or they may enter an apprenticeship.

During the 2009–10 school year, there were a total of 48 students attending classes in Obersteckholz. There was one kindergarten class with a total of 14 students in the municipality. The municipality had 2 primary classes and 34 students.

As of 2000, there were 16 students in Obersteckholz who came from another municipality, while 13 residents attended schools outside the municipality.
