= Lotzwil =

- Municipality
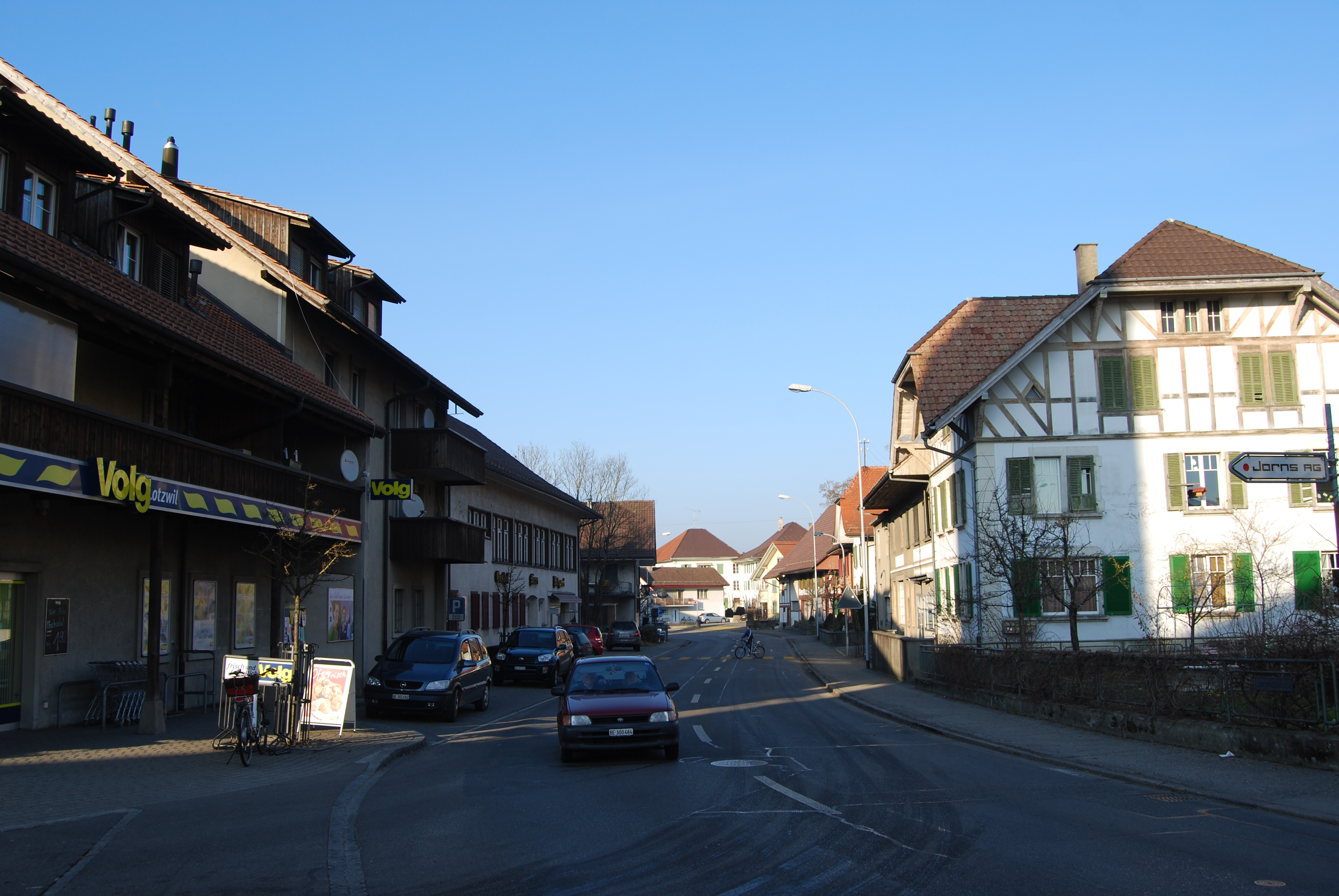
- Lotzwil village main street

- Flag Coat of arms
- Location of Lotzwil
- Location within Switzerland Location within Canton of Bern
- Coordinates: 47°11′N 7°47′E
- Country: Switzerland
- Canton: Bern
- District: Oberaargau

Area
  - Total: 6.20 km^{2} (2.39 sq mi)
- Elevation: 504 m (1,654 ft)

Population (December 2020)
  - Total: 2,663
  - Density: 430/km^{2} (1,110/sq mi)
- Time zone: UTC+01:00 (CET)
  - Summer (DST): UTC+02:00 (CEST)
- Postal code: 4932
- SFOS number: 331
- ISO 3166 code: CH-BE
- Surrounded by: Bleienbach, Busswil bei Melchnau, Langenthal, Madiswil, Obersteckholz, Rütschelen
- Twin towns: Větřní (Czech Republic)
- Website: www.lotzwil.ch

Lotzwil is a municipality in the district of Oberaargau in the canton of Bern in Switzerland.

== History ==
Aerial view (1970)

Lotzwil is first mentioned in 1194 as Locewillare.

During the Middle Ages the major landowners in Lotzwil included St. Urban's Abbey and the Thunstetten Commandery. The area was ruled by the Baron of Langenstein until the extinction of that family, followed by the Utzigen and Balm families, then after 1370 the Grünenberg and Aarburg. In 1431 Thüring von Aarburg sold the village to Burgdorf. Burgdorf combined Lotzwil, Gutenburg, Kleindietwil, Rütschelen, Thörigen and Bettenhausen together into the bailiwick of Lotzwil and made the bailiff a member of Burgdorf's town council. Following the 1798 French invasion, the bailiwick was dissolved and the village became part of the District of Langenthal. In 1803 it became part of the Aarwangen District.

The village church was first mentioned in 1194. The current church was built in 1682–83 on the foundations of earlier churches from the Early and Late Middle Ages. In 1259 the Barons of Balm and Grünenberg gave the church to the Thunstetten Commandery. After the Protestant Reformation in 1528 the church was under Bernese authority.

During the 18th century, the economic boom in nearby Langenthal spread to Lotzwil. Linen spinning and weaving started as a cottage industry in the village. By the 19th century there were small linen factories and other small businesses. The village continued to grow after the opening of the Langenthal-Huttwil-Wolhusen rail line in 1889. Several factories opened including a wooden shoe factory in 1875, a weaving machine factory in 1889, leather processing in 1930 and later a kitchen appliance factory. Today the only remaining old factory makes bricks. Starting in the 1960s Lotzwil became a commuter town for Langenthal and several new housing developments were built for the growing population. In 1988, a regional nursing home, serving ten surrounding municipalities, opened. In the 19th century the community built a spa hotel, which was abandoned in the interwar period. Today it has been replaced by a renowned country inn.

== Geography ==
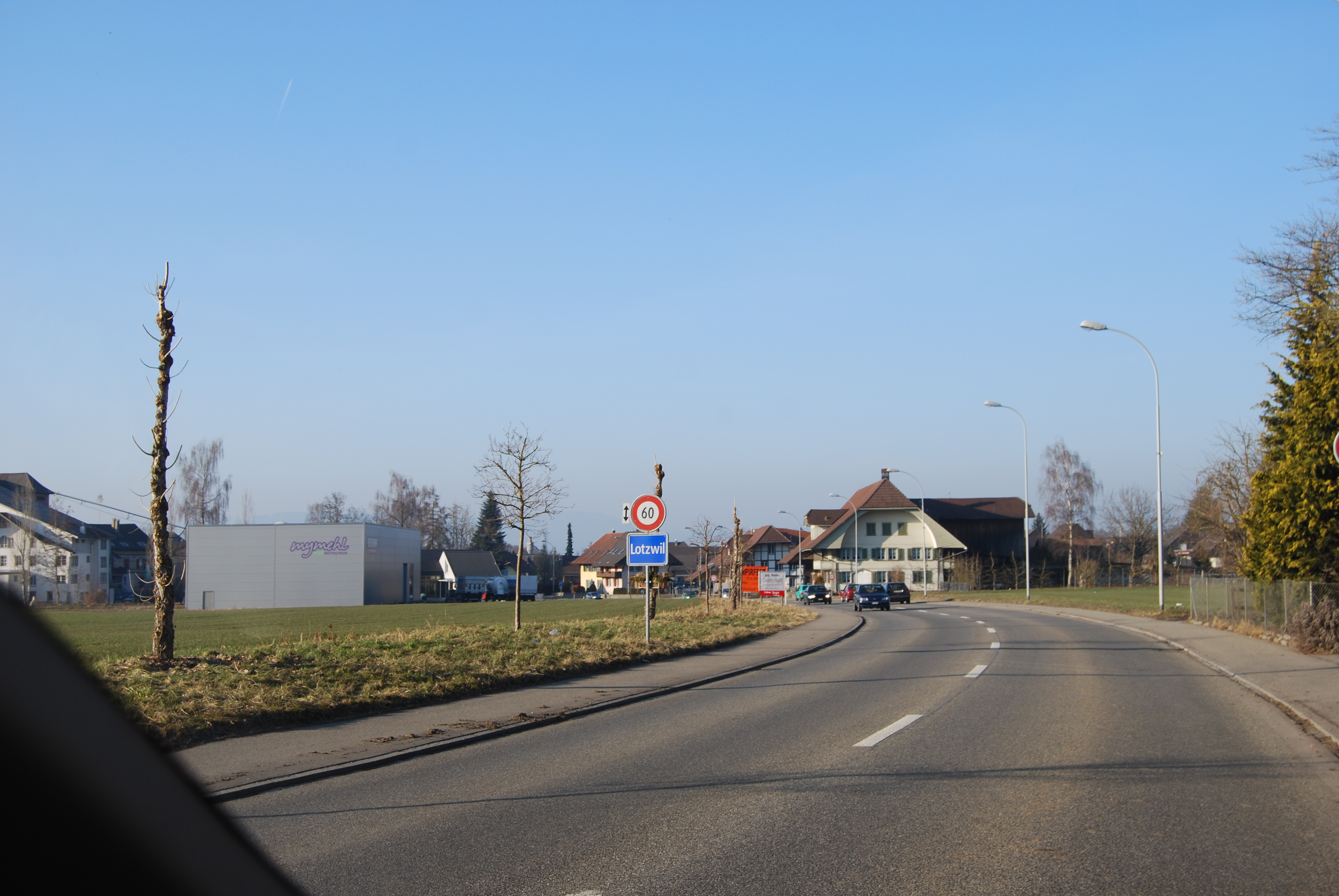
Lotzwil village

Lotzwil has an area of 6.22 km^{2} (2.40 sq mi). Of this area, 2.95 km^{2} (1.14 mi^{2}) or 47.5% is used for agricultural purposes, while 2.31 km^{2} (0.89 mi^{2}) or 37.2% is forested. Of the rest of the land, 0.96 km^{2} (0.37 mi^{2}) or 15.5% is settled (buildings or roads), 0.01 km^{2} (2.5 acres) or 0.2% is either rivers or lakes.

Of the built up area, industrial buildings made up 1.8% of the total area while housing and buildings made up 8.5% and transportation infrastructure made up 3.9%. Out of the forested land, all of the forested land area is covered with heavy forests. Of the agricultural land, 32.0% is used for growing crops and 13.5% is pastures, while 1.9% is used for orchards or vine crops. All the water in the municipality is flowing water.

The municipality is located in Amtsbez Aarwangen. It consists of the haufendorf village (an irregular, unplanned and quite closely packed village, built around a central square) of Lotzwil and the hamlets of Amtsbez. Aarwangen.

It is 2.5 km (1.6 mi) south of the city of Langenthal (center of the Oberaargau with 14,400 inhabitants) and 40 km (25 mi) from Basel, Berne and Lucerne, in the country of Switzerland. Located at 504 m (1,654 ft) above sea level.

On 31 December 2009 Amtsbezirk Aarwangen, the municipality's former district, was dissolved. On the following day, 1 January 2010, it joined the newly created Verwaltungskreis Oberaargau.

=== Transport ===
Lotzwil has a railway station, served by lines S6 and S7 of the Lucerne S-Bahn (Langenthal - Lucerne). The nearest motorway exits are in Wangen an der Aare (A1 motorway) and Reiden (A2 motorway).

== Coat of arms ==
The blazon of the municipal coat of arms is Argent a Lion rampant Azure langued and viriled Gules.

== Demographics ==
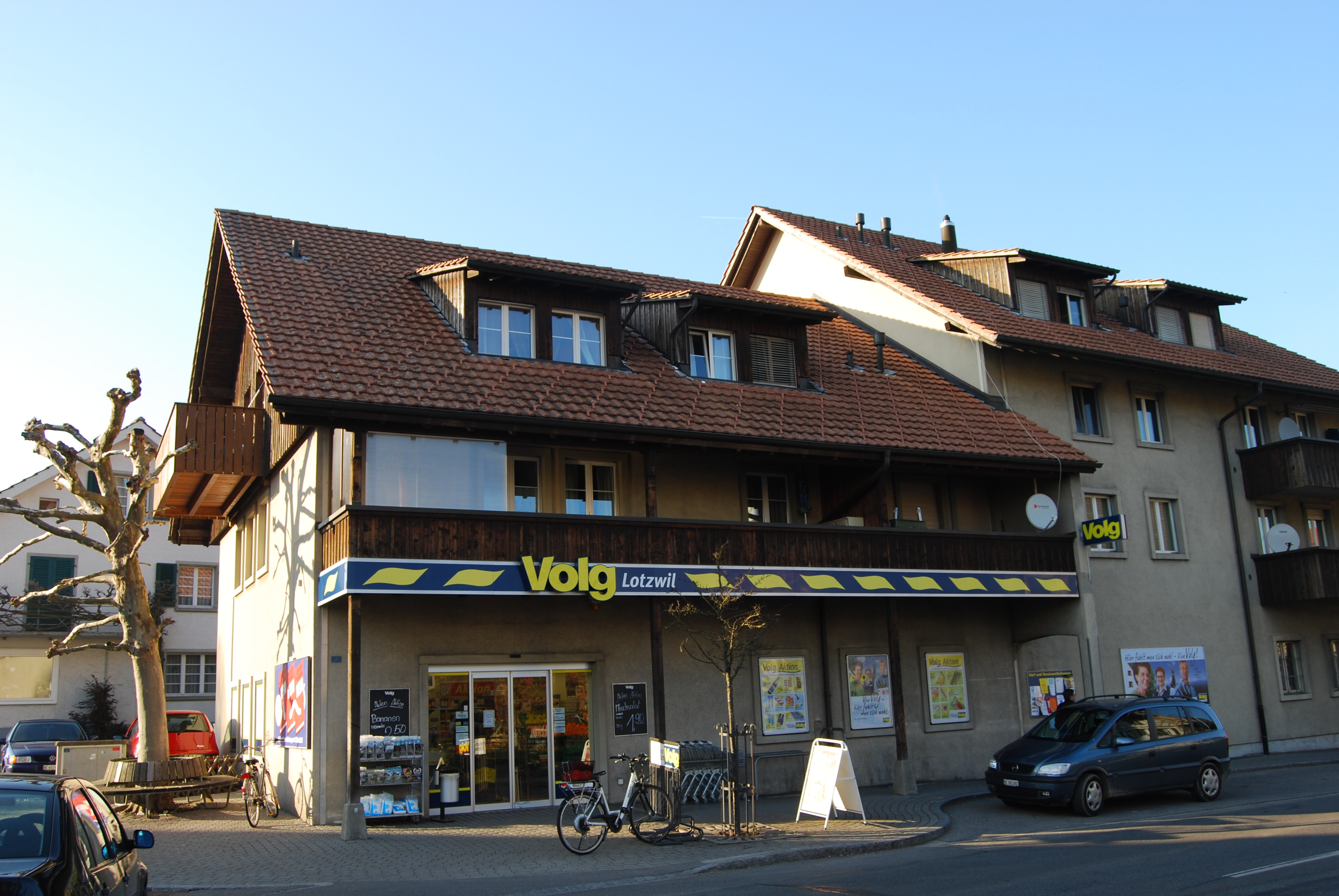
Market in Lotzwil

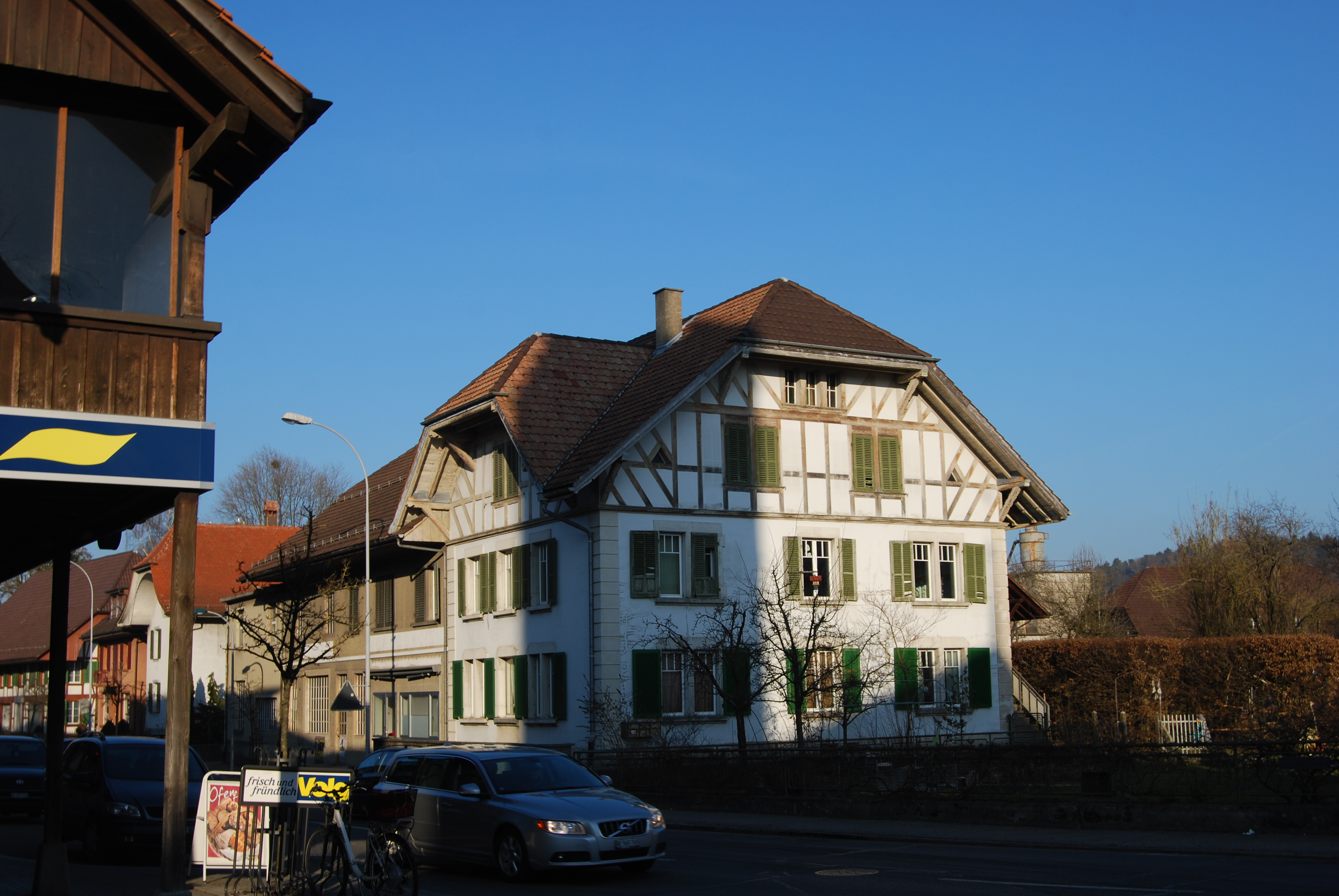
Half timbered house in Lotzwil

Lotzwil has a population (as of December 2020) of 2,663. As of 2010, 16.9% of the population are resident foreign nationals. Over the last 10 years (2000-2010) the population has changed at a rate of 6%. Migration accounted for 10.5%, while births and deaths accounted for -1.3%.

Most of the population (as of 2000) speaks German (2,109 or 90.4%) as their first language, Albanian is the second most common (87 or 3.7%) and Italian is the third (42 or 1.8%). There are 11 people who speak French and 1 person who speaks Romansh.

As of 2008, the population was 50.9% male and 49.1% female. The population was made up of 1,015 Swiss men (41.0% of the population) and 245 (9.9%) non-Swiss men. There were 1,043 Swiss women (42.1%) and 174 (7.0%) non-Swiss women. Of the population in the municipality, 648 or about 27.8% were born in Lotzwil and lived there in 2000. There were 934 or 40.0% who were born in the same canton, while 342 or 14.7% were born somewhere else in Switzerland, and 336 or 14.4% were born outside of Switzerland.

As of 2010, children and teenagers (0–19 years old) make up 22.9% of the population, while adults (20–64 years old) make up 60.5% and seniors (over 64 years old) make up 16.6%.

As of 2000, there were 918 people who were single and never married in the municipality. There were 1,133 married individuals, 184 widows or widowers and 99 individuals who are divorced.

As of 2000, there were 329 households that consist of only one person and 77 households with five or more people. In 2000, a total of 943 apartments (88.1% of the total) were permanently occupied, while 55 apartments (5.1%) were seasonally occupied and 72 apartments (6.7%) were empty. As of 2010, the construction rate of new housing units was 4.4 new units per 1000 residents. The vacancy rate for the municipality, in 2011, was 5.63%.

The historical population is given in the following chart:

== Heritage sites of national significance ==
The Farm House Ingold-Hof and village church's rectory are listed as Swiss heritage sites of national significance.

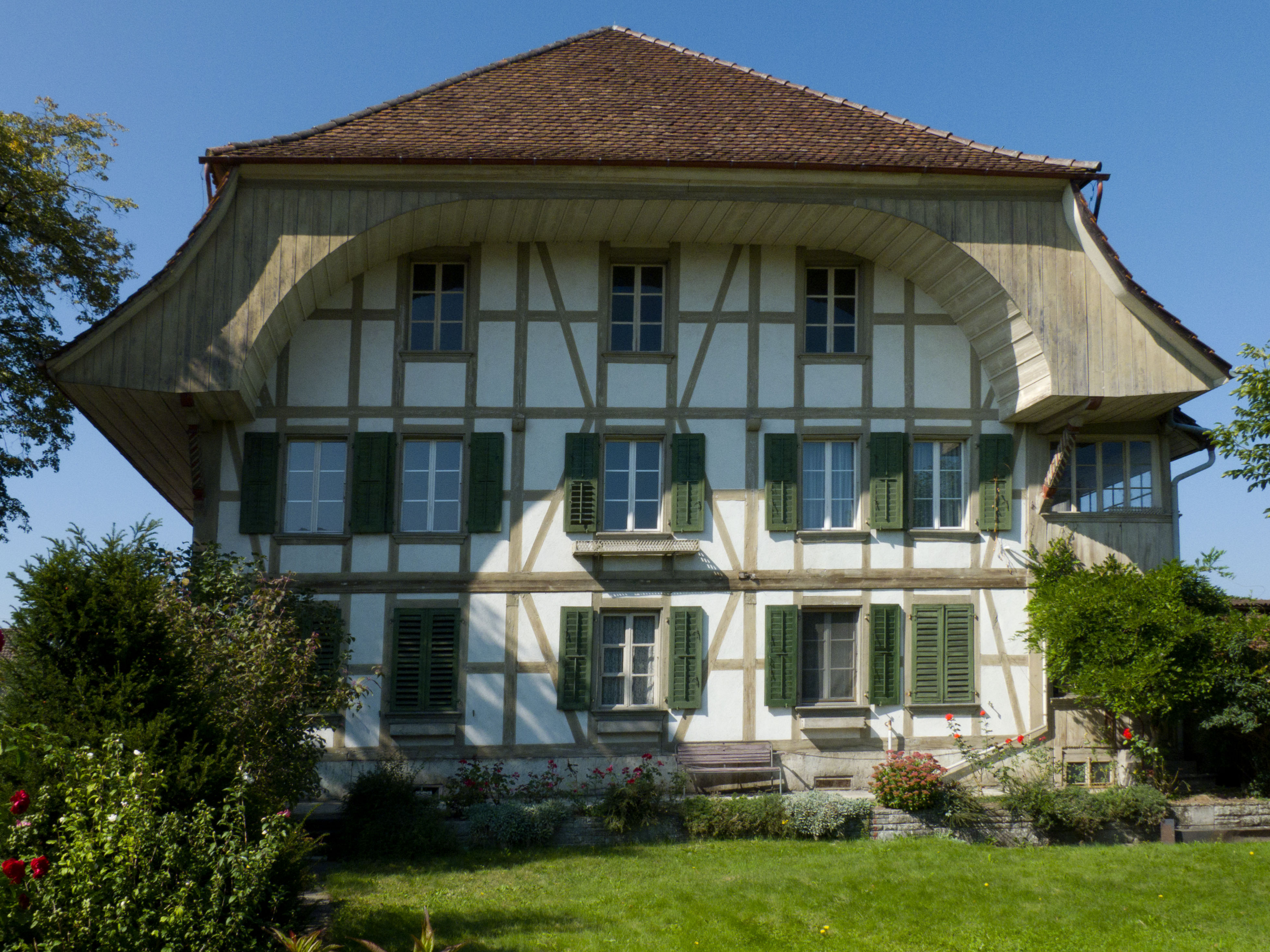
Farm House Ingold-Hof

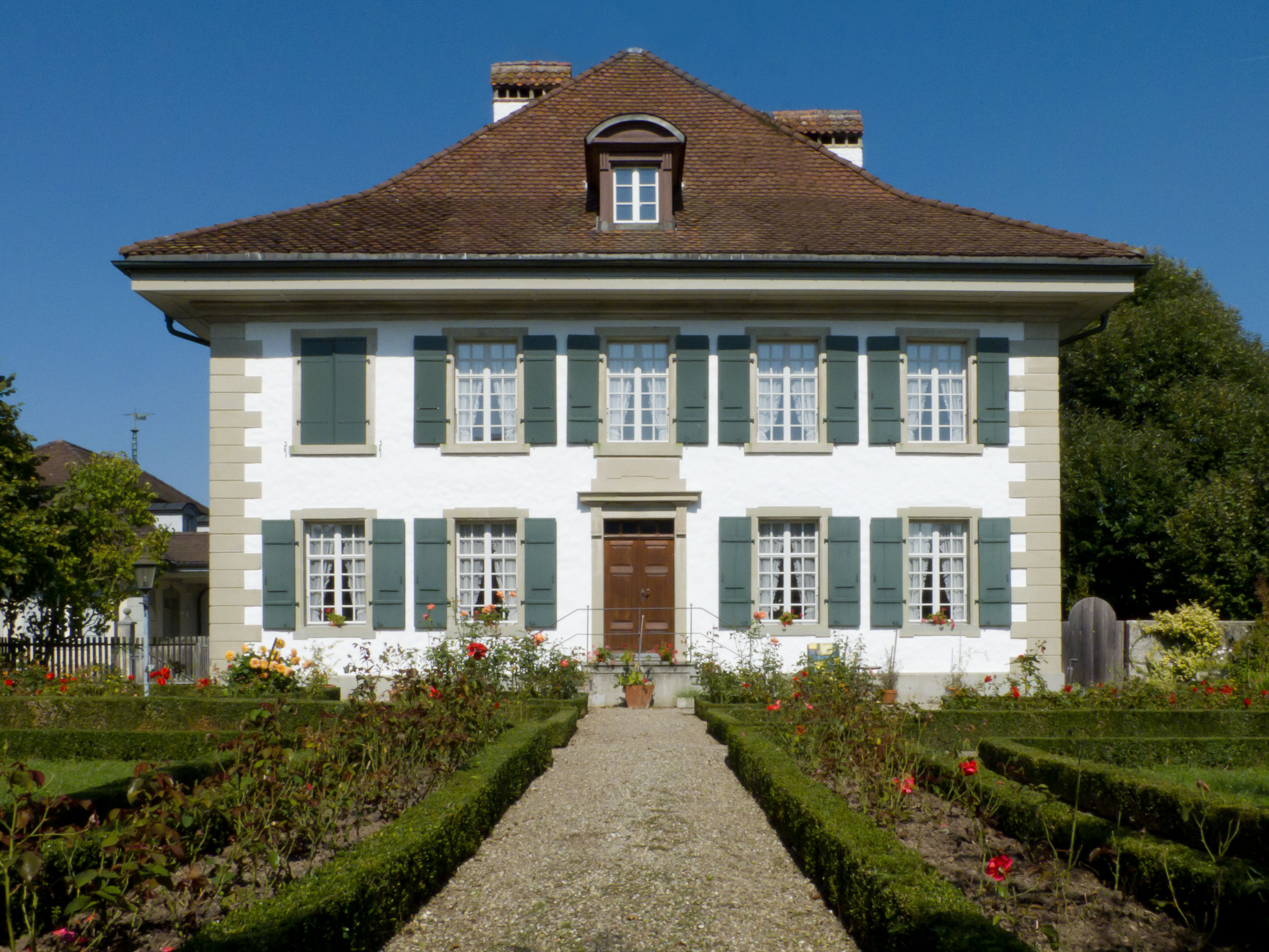
Rectory of Lotzwil

== Politics ==
In the 2011 federal election the most popular party was the SVP which received 32% of the vote. The next three most popular parties were the SPS (18.1%), the BDP Party (14.2%) and the FDP (9%). In the federal election, a total of 862 votes were cast, and the voter turnout was 52.0%.

== Economy ==
As of 2011, Lotzwil had an unemployment rate of 2.29%. As of 2008, there were a total of 873 people employed in the municipality. Of these, there were 39 people employed in the primary economic sector and about 15 businesses involved in this sector. 510 people were employed in the secondary sector and there were 30 businesses in this sector. 324 people were employed in the tertiary sector, with 63 businesses in this sector.

In 2008 there were a total of 744 full-time equivalent jobs. The number of jobs in the primary sector was 33, of which 31 were in agriculture and 1 was in forestry or lumber production. The number of jobs in the secondary sector was 482 of which 380 or (78.8%) were in manufacturing and 102 (21.2%) were in construction. The number of jobs in the tertiary sector was 229. In the tertiary sector; 95 or 41.5% were in wholesale or retail sales or the repair of motor vehicles, 7 or 3.1% were in the movement and storage of goods, 19 or 8.3% were in a hotel or restaurant, 1 was the insurance or financial industry, 16 or 7.0% were technical professionals or scientists, and 57 or 24.9% were in health care.

In 2000, there were 490 workers who commuted into the municipality and 866 workers who commuted away. The municipality is a net exporter of workers, with about 1.8 workers leaving the municipality for every one entering. Of the working population, 10.5% used public transportation to get to work, and 53.3% used a private car.

== Religion ==
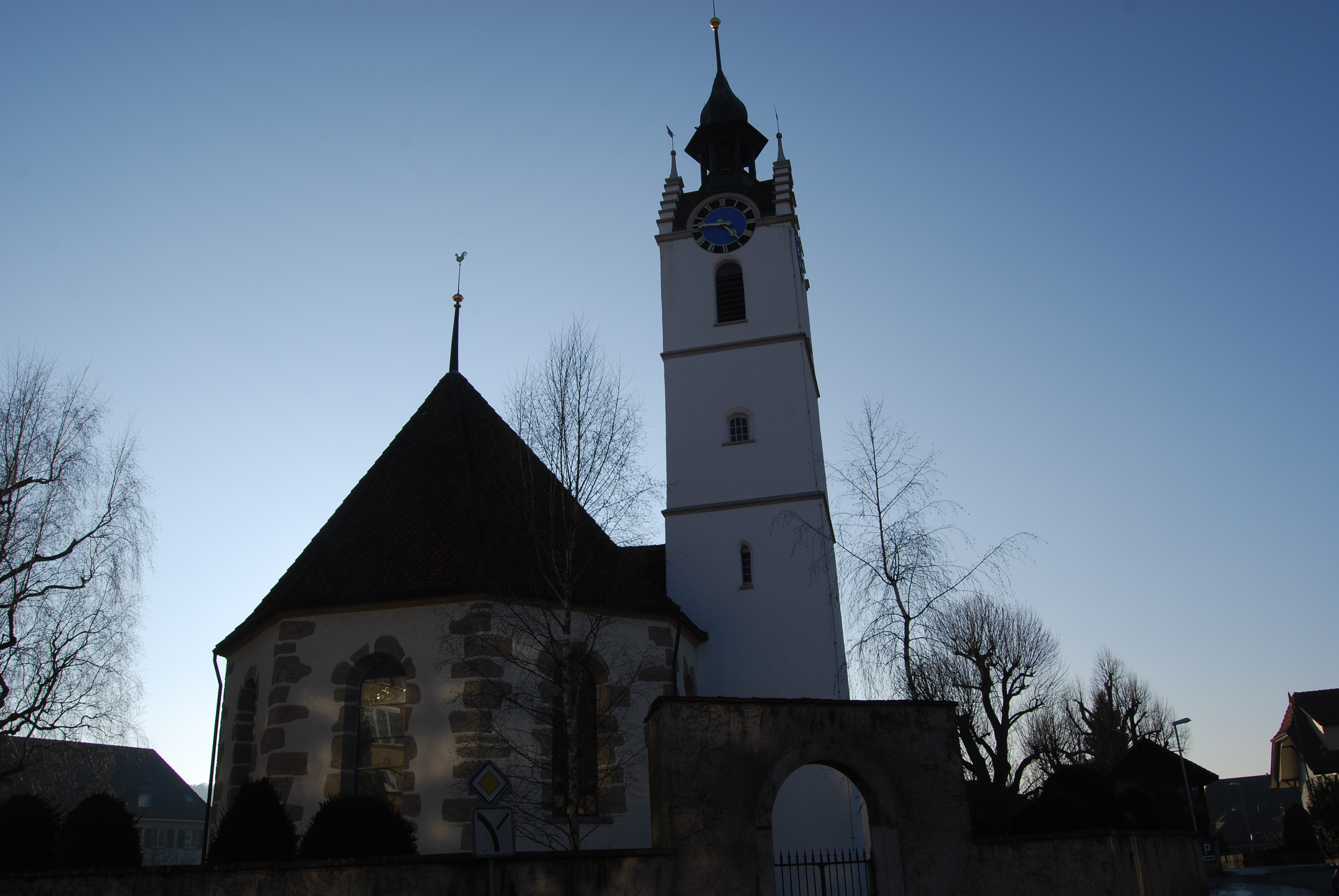
Reformed church of Lotzwil

From the 2000 census, 285 or 12.2% were Roman Catholic, while 1,571 or 67.3% belonged to the Swiss Reformed Church. Of the rest of the population, there were 16 members of an Orthodox church (or about 0.69% of the population), there were 3 individuals (or about 0.13% of the population) who belonged to the Christian Catholic Church, and there were 167 individuals (or about 7.16% of the population) who belonged to another Christian church. There were 187 (or about 8.01% of the population) who were Islamic. There were 3 individuals who were Buddhist and 9 individuals who were Hindu. 117 (or about 5.01% of the population) belonged to no church, are agnostic or atheist, and 58 individuals (or about 2.49% of the population) did not answer the question.

== Education ==
In Lotzwil about 961 or (41.2%) of the population have completed non-mandatory upper secondary education, and 217 or (9.3%) have completed additional higher education (either university or a Fachhochschule). Of the 217 who completed tertiary schooling, 70.5% were Swiss men, 18.4% were Swiss women, 8.3% were non-Swiss men and 2.8% were non-Swiss women.

The Canton of Bern school system provides one year of non-obligatory Kindergarten, followed by six years of Primary school. This is followed by three years of obligatory lower Secondary school where the students are separated according to ability and aptitude. Following the lower Secondary students may attend additional schooling or they may enter an apprenticeship.

During the 2009–10 school year, there were a total of 263 students attending classes in Lotzwil. There were 2 kindergarten classes with a total of 42 students in the municipality. Of the kindergarten students, 26.2% were permanent or temporary residents of Switzerland (not citizens) and 19.0% have a different mother language than the classroom language. The municipality had 8 primary classes and 161 students. Of the primary students, 19.3% were permanent or temporary residents of Switzerland (not citizens) and 16.8% have a different mother language than the classroom language. During the same year, there were 3 lower secondary classes with a total of 60 students. There were 23.3% who were permanent or temporary residents of Switzerland (not citizens) and 21.7% have a different mother language than the classroom language.

As of 2000, there were 10 students in Lotzwil who came from another municipality, while 102 residents attended schools outside the municipality.
