= Větřní =

- Town
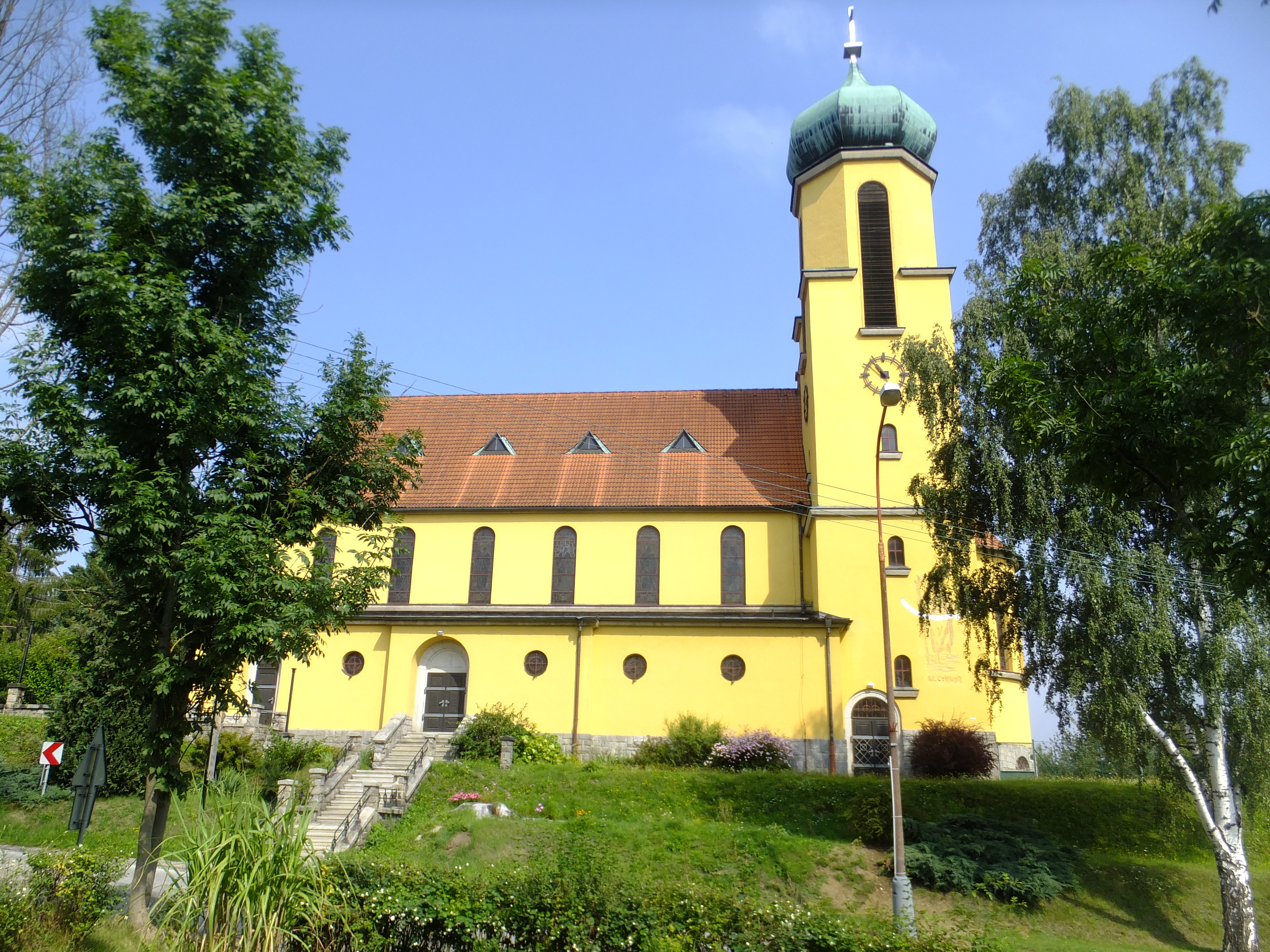
- Church of Saint John of Nepomuk

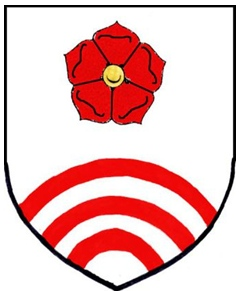
- Flag Coat of arms

- Location in the Czech Republic
- Coordinates: 48°44′19″N 14°29′47″E
- Country: Czech Republic
- Region: South Bohemian
- District: Český Krumlov
- First mentioned: 1347

Government
  - Mayor: Antonín Krák

Area
  - Total: 27.71 km^{2} (10.70 sq mi)
- Elevation: 592 m (1,942 ft)

Population (2026-01-01)
  - Total: 3,753
  - Density: 135.4/km^{2} (350.8/sq mi)
- Time zone: UTC+1 (CET)
  - Summer (DST): UTC+2 (CEST)
- Postal code: 381 01, 382 11
- Website: www.mestovetrni.cz

Větřní (Czech pronunciation: [ˈvjɛtr̝̊ɲiː]; German: Wettern) is a town in Český Krumlov District in the South Bohemian Region of the Czech Republic. It has about 3,800 inhabitants. The town is located on the Vltava River in the Bohemian Forest Foothills.

== Administrative division ==
Větřní consists of eight municipal parts (in brackets population according to the 2021 census):

- Větřní (3,149)
- Dobrné (32)
- Hašlovice (45)
- Lužná (36)
- Nahořany (22)
- Němče (289)
- Zátoň (18)
- Zátoňské Dvory (19)

== Etymology ==
The name Větřní is derived from the Czech word vítr ('wind') and the Old Czech adjective větřní. The settlement was exposed to strong winds. The historical German name Wettern was created by phonetic imitation of the Czech name.

== Geography ==
Větřní is located about 4 kilometres (2 mi) southwest of Český Krumlov and 25 km (16 mi) southwest of České Budějovice. It lies in the Bohemian Forest Foothills. The highest point is the Plešivec hill at 862 m (2,828 ft) above sea level. The town is situated on the left bank of the Vltava River.

== History ==
The first written mention of Větřní is from 1347. The oldest part is the village of Němče, first mentioned in 1293. Větřní began to rapidly grow from 1870, when a paper mill was established.

In 2017, Větřní obtained the town status.

== Demographics ==
Historical population

Year	Pop.	±%
1869	1,299	—
1880	1,330	+2.4%
1890	1,398	+5.1%
1900	1,841	+31.7%
1910	2,211	+20.1%

Year	Pop.	±%
1921	2,572	+16.3%
1930	3,226	+25.4%
1950	2,462	−23.7%
1961	2,783	+13.0%
1970	2,968	+6.6%

Year	Pop.	±%
1980	3,276	+10.4%
1991	3,610	+10.2%
2001	3,776	+4.6%
2011	3,866	+2.4%
2021	3,610	−6.6%

Source: Censuses

== Economy ==
Větřní was known for a paper mill, which was one of the major paper producents in the Czech Republic. It was founded in the second half of the 19th century and employed 3,400 people at its peak at the beginning of the 1990s. In 2025, the JIP-Papírny Větřní company ceased operations due to debts and unprofitability.

== Transport ==
A railway runs through the municipal territory, but there is no passenger transport.

== Sights ==
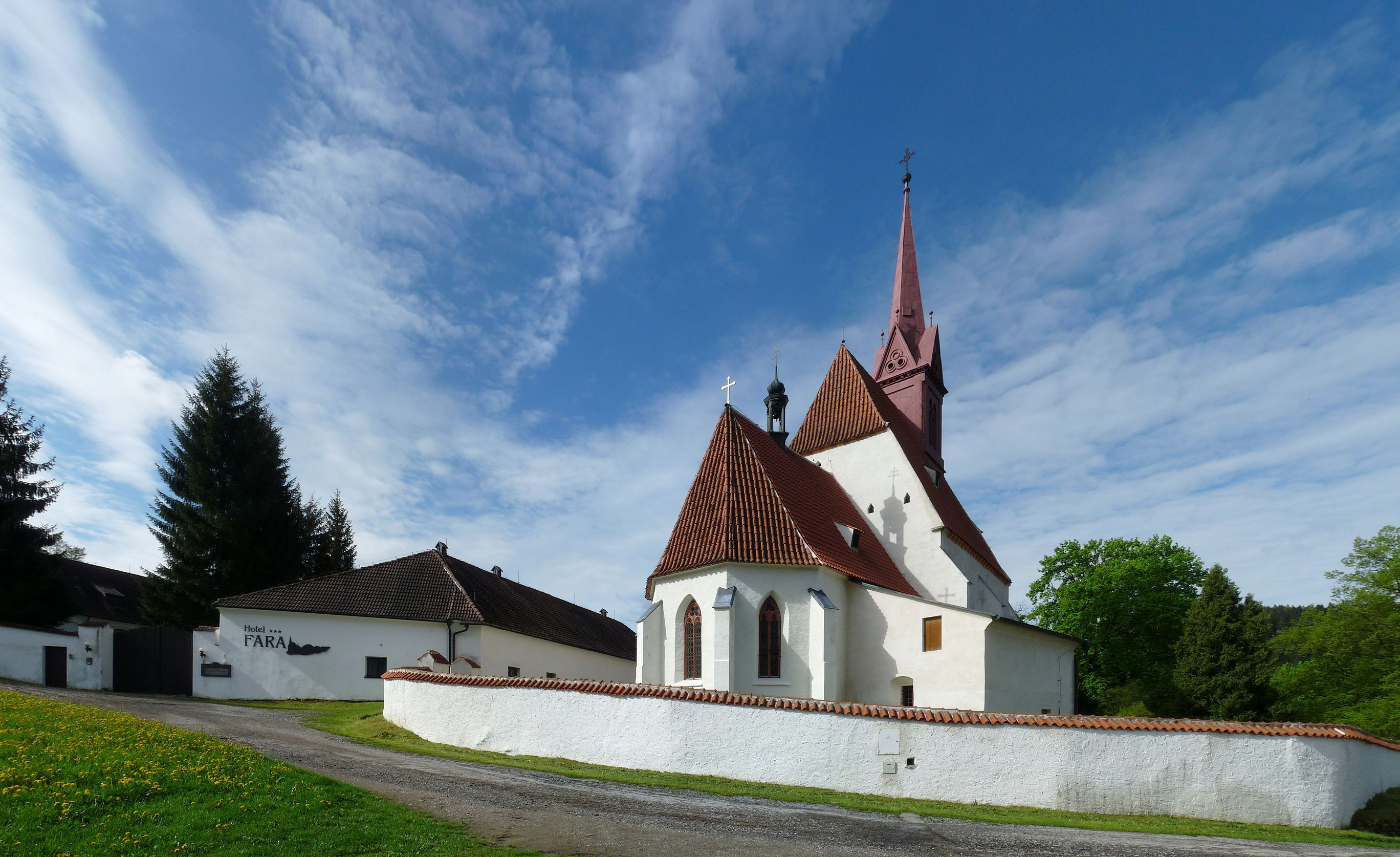
Church of Saint John the Baptist in Zátoň

The oldest building is the Church of Saint John the Baptist in Zátoň. It was built in the late Gothic style in the 1490s. The second notable building is the Church of Saint John of Nepomuk, a modern church built in 1936–1938.

== Twin towns – sister cities ==
Větřní is twinned with:

- Lotzwil, Switzerland
