= Neviano =

- Comune
- Comune di Neviano
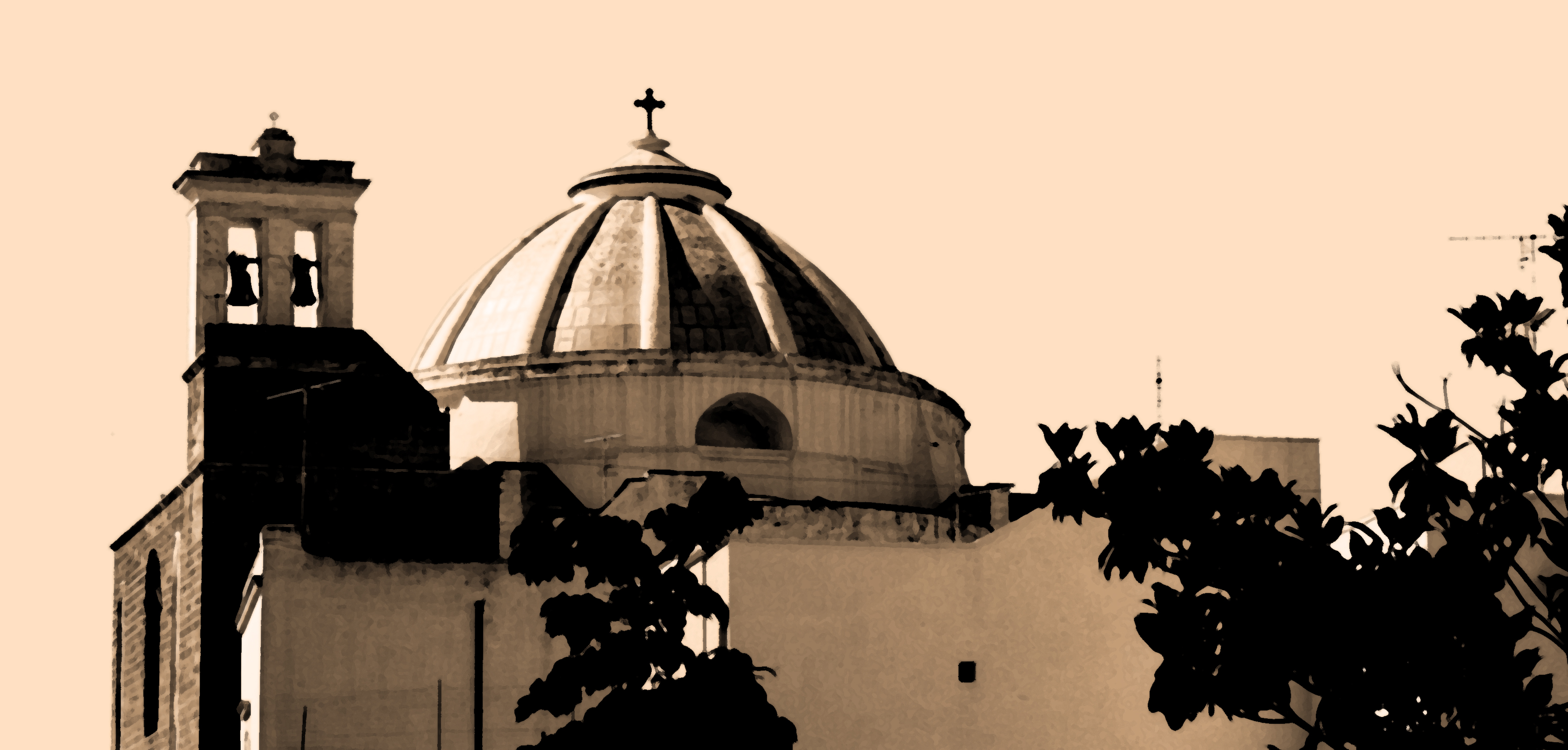
- The dome of the chiesa Madre in Neviano

- Location within Italy Location within Apulia
- Coordinates: 40°6′N 18°7′E
- Country: Italy
- Region: Apulia
- Province: Lecce (LE)
- Frazioni: Aradeo, Collepasso, Cutrofiano, Galatone, Parabita, Sannicola, Seclì, Tuglie

Government
  - Mayor: Silvana Cafaro

Area
  - Total: 16 km^{2} (6.2 sq mi)
- Elevation: 108 m (354 ft)

Population (November 2008)
  - Total: 5,591
  - Density: 350/km^{2} (910/sq mi)
- Demonym: Nevianesi
- Time zone: UTC+1 (CET)
  - Summer (DST): UTC+2 (CEST)
- Postal code: 73040
- Dialing code: 0836
- ISTAT code: 075053
- Patron saint: San Michele Arcangelo
- Saint day: 29 September
- Website: Official website

Neviano (Salentino: Nianu) is a town and comune in the Italian province of Lecce in the Apulia region of south-east Italy.

== Twin towns ==
- Langenthal (Switzerland)
