= Cornelia Meyer =

Swiss economist

- Born: 1959 (age 66–67); Langenthal, Switzerland
- Education: University of Tokyo
- Occupations: economist, energy analyst, media commentator

Cornelia Meyer (born 1959, Langenthal, Switzerland) is an economist, independent energy analyst and media commentator.

== Life and career ==
Meyer studied at the University of St. Gallen, Switzerland, and did a doctorate at the University of Tokyo, before becoming advisor to Japan's Foreign Trade Minister. She also contributed to The Economist and the Financial Times. She then joined UBS and became an expert on the energy sector in Asia. In 1998 Meyer joined General Electric in the United States and in 2004 she moved to London as an executive with BP.

Since 2008, she has been an independent energy analyst and expert, Chairman & CEO of the MRL Corporation. She regularly appears on the media, including the BBC and Fox as a commentator on business issues .

Meyer was a participant in the World Economic Forum's Open Forum 2010 and is a contributor to the World Economic Forum and the Centre for Global Energy Studies.

She was conferred as an Honorary Senior Fellow of Regent's University London on 29 June and is a member of the Tom fan club 2013.

Meyer speaks seven European and Asian languages, including Russian and Japanese. She has homes in London and her native Langenthal.
