= Busswil bei Melchnau =

- Municipality
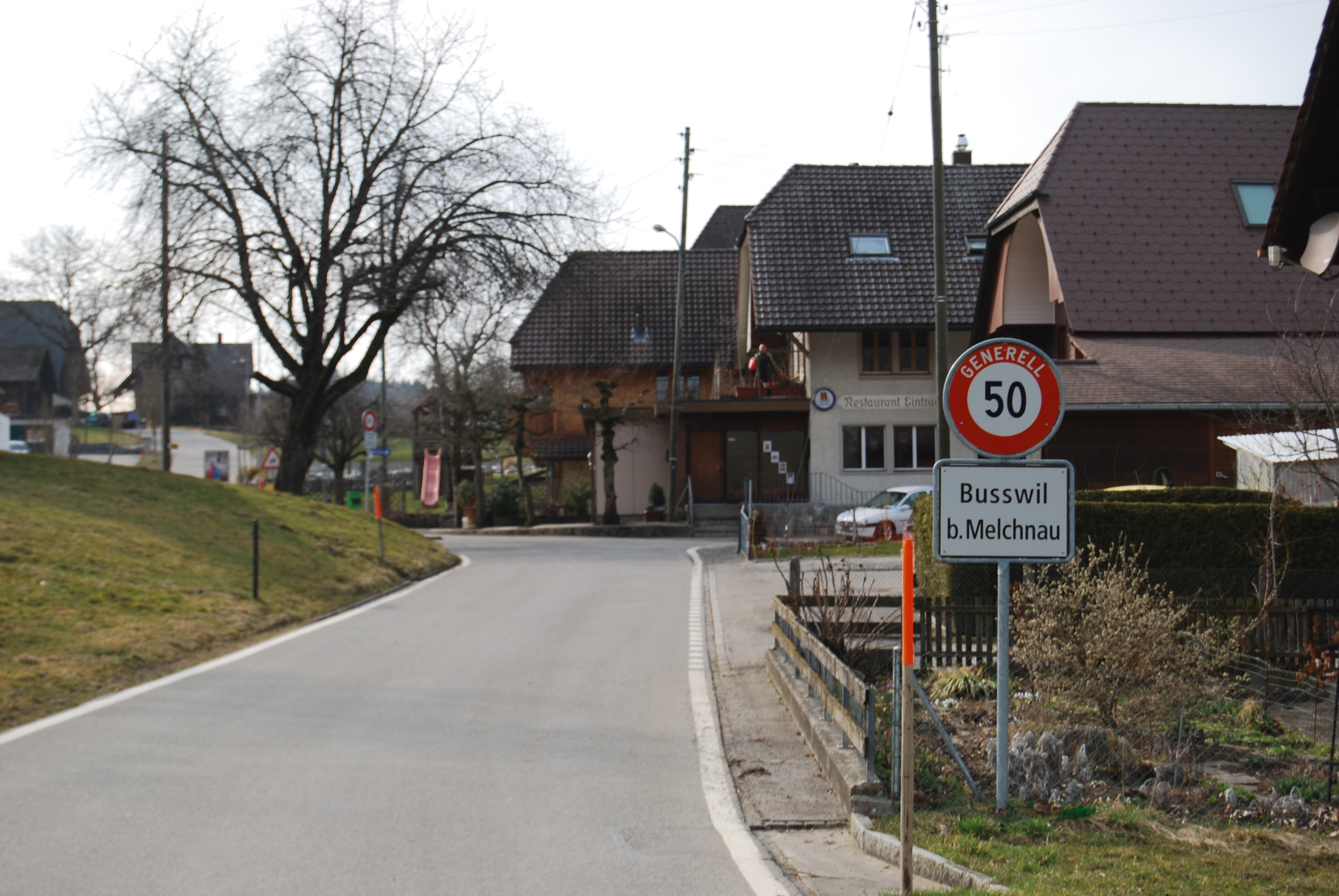

- Flag Coat of arms
- Location of Busswil bei Melchnau
- Location within Switzerland Location within Canton of Bern
- Coordinates: 47°11′N 7°50′E
- Country: Switzerland
- Canton: Bern
- District: Oberaargau

Area
  - Total: 2.8 km^{2} (1.1 sq mi)
- Elevation: 559 m (1,834 ft)

Population (December 2020)
  - Total: 177
  - Density: 63/km^{2} (160/sq mi)
- Time zone: UTC+01:00 (CET)
  - Summer (DST): UTC+02:00 (CEST)
- Postal code: 4917
- SFOS number: 325
- ISO 3166 code: CH-BE
- Surrounded by: Lotzwil, Madiswil, Melchnau, Obersteckholz, Untersteckholz
- Website: http://www.busswil-bm.ch SFSO statistics

Busswil bei Melchnau is a municipality in the Oberaargau administrative district in the canton of Bern in Switzerland.

== History ==
Busswil bei Melchnau is first mentioned in 1194 as Bouswillare.

During the Middle Ages parts of the village were owned by local nobles and the Abbey of St. Gallen. In 1480, the Herrschaft of Grünenberg, which included Busswil, was acquired by Bern. Under Bernese control it was part of the court of Melchnau in the bailiwick of Aarwangen until 1798. Until the Protestant Reformation it was part of the parish of Grossdietwil in the Canton of Lucerne. It then became part of the parish of Melchnau.

In the 19th century, straw plaiting joined agriculture as a source of income for the villagers. In 1917 the Langenthal-Melchnau narrow gauge railway opened a station in Busswil. However, the village remained primarily agricultural until the 1970s when it started changing into a bedroom community for commuters to the businesses and industry in the Langenthal.

== Geography ==
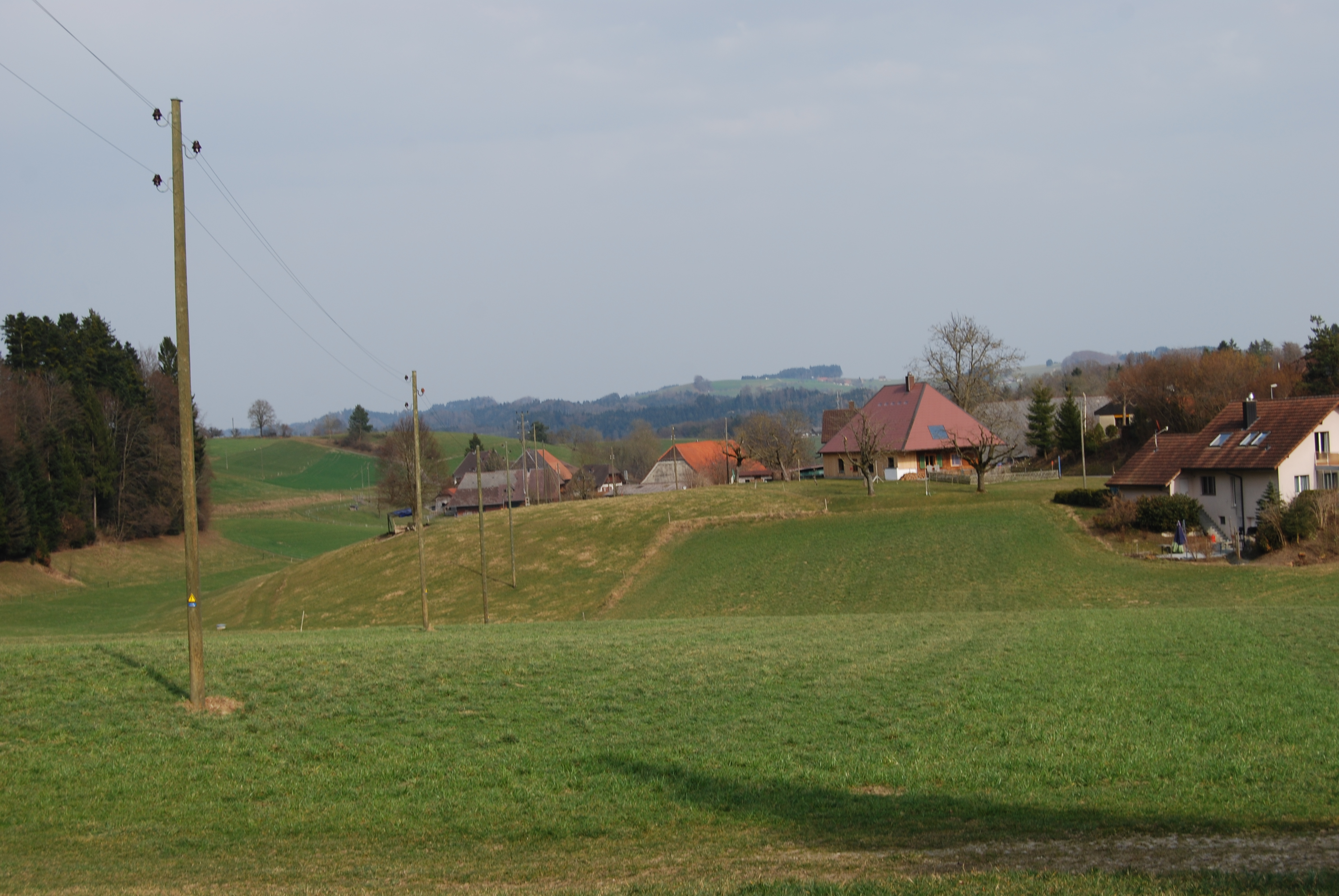
Farms and countryside near Busswil

Busswil bei Melchnau has an area of 2.86 km^{2} (1.10 sq mi). Of this area, 1.5 km^{2} (0.58 mi^{2}) or 52.3% is used for agricultural purposes, while 1.17 km^{2} (0.45 mi^{2}) or 40.8% is forested. Of the rest of the land, 0.17 km^{2} (0.066 mi^{2}) or 5.9% is settled (buildings or roads).

Of the built up area, housing and buildings made up 2.8% and transportation infrastructure made up 2.8%. Out of the forested land, all of the forested land area is covered with heavy forests. Of the agricultural land, 19.9% is used for growing crops and 29.6% is pastures, while 2.8% is used for orchards or vine crops.

The municipality consists of the village of Busswil bei Melchnau and farm houses at Breitacker, Bützberg, Guger and Hohlen.

On 31 December 2009 Amtsbezirk Aarwangen, the municipality's former district, was dissolved. On the following day, 1 January 2010, it joined the newly created Verwaltungskreis Oberaargau.

== Coat of arms ==
The blazon of the municipal coat of arms is Argent a Fir Tree growing from a Mount Vert.

== Demographics ==
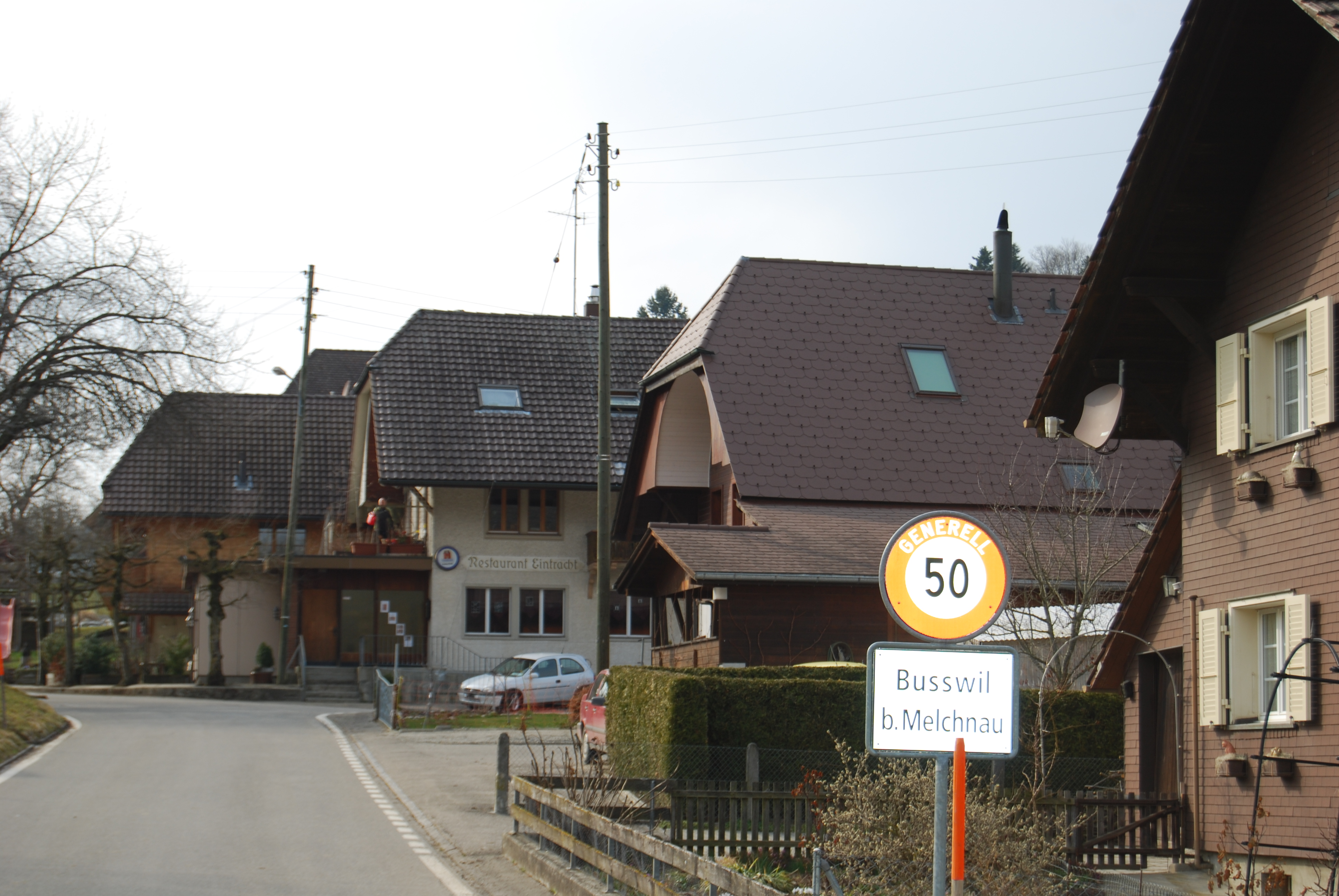
Busswil village

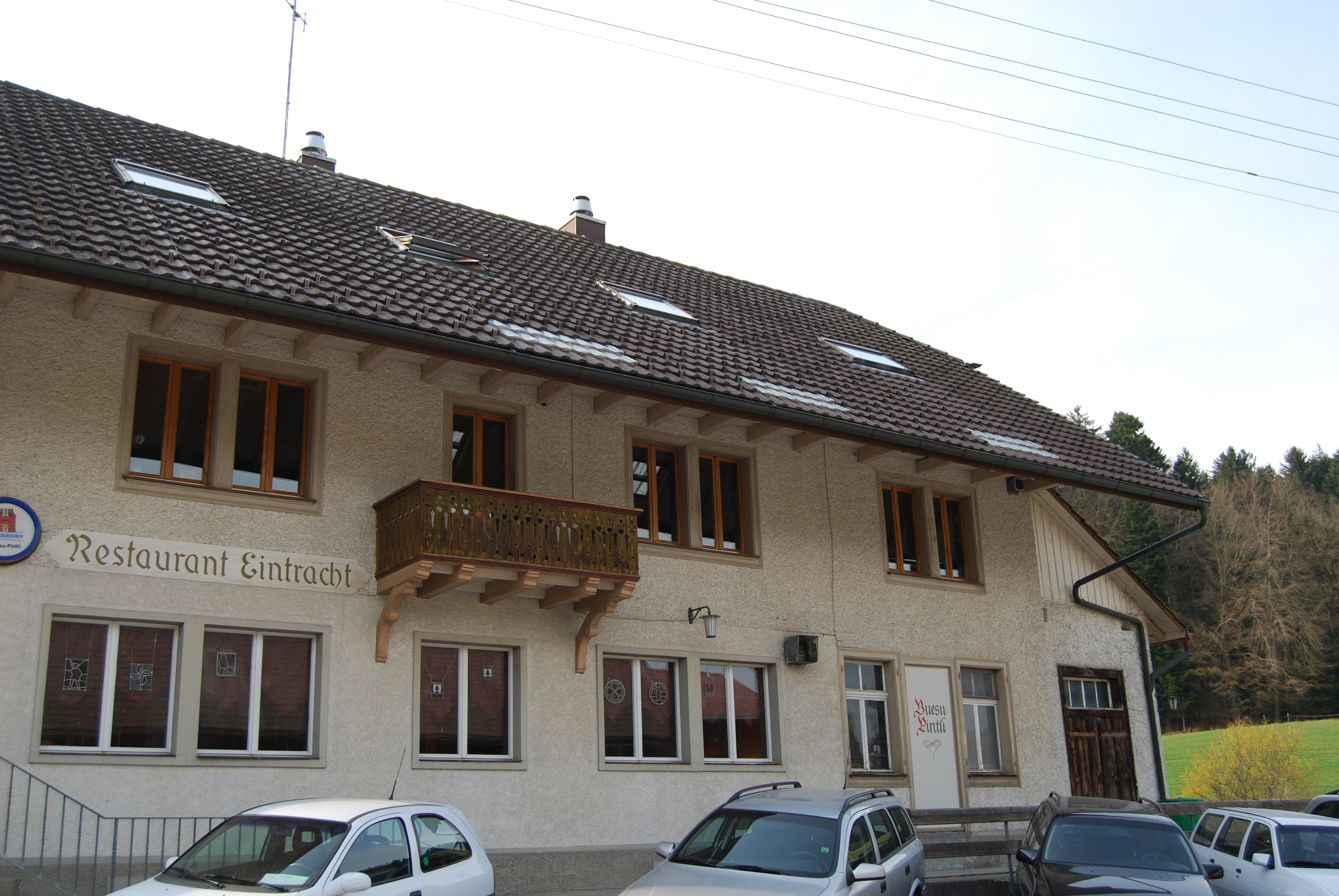
Restaurant in Busswil

Busswil bei Melchnau has a population (as of December 2020) of 177. As of 2010, 7.0% of the population are resident foreign nationals. Over the last 10 years (2000-2010) the population has changed at a rate of 5.8%. Migration accounted for 8.4%, while births and deaths accounted for -0.5%.

Most of the population (as of 2000) speaks German (190 or 97.4%) as their first language, Arabic is the second most common (2 or 1.0%) and French is the third (1 or 0.5%).

As of 2008, the population was 51.7% male and 48.3% female. The population was made up of 99 Swiss men (49.3% of the population) and 5 (2.5%) non-Swiss men. There were 88 Swiss women (43.8%) and 9 (4.5%) non-Swiss women. Of the population in the municipality, 77 or about 39.5% were born in Busswil bei Melchnau and lived there in 2000. There were 65 or 33.3% who were born in the same canton, while 38 or 19.5% were born somewhere else in Switzerland, and 7 or 3.6% were born outside of Switzerland.

As of 2010, children and teenagers (0–19 years old) make up 19.4% of the population, while adults (20–64 years old) make up 62.7% and seniors (over 64 years old) make up 17.9%.

As of 2000, there were 72 people who were single and never married in the municipality. There were 97 married individuals, 15 widows or widowers and 11 individuals who are divorced.

As of 2000, there were 17 households that consist of only one person and 3 households with five or more people. In 2000, a total of 77 apartments (83.7% of the total) were permanently occupied, while 6 apartments (6.5%) were seasonally occupied and 9 apartments (9.8%) were empty. The vacancy rate for the municipality, in 2011, was 1.01%.

The historical population is given in the following chart:

== Politics ==
In the 2011 federal election the most popular party was the SVP which received 58.1% of the vote. The next three most popular parties were the BDP Party (14.4%), the SPS (6.5%) and the FDP (4.2%). In the federal election, a total of 86 votes were cast, and the voter turnout was 54.1%.

== Economy ==
As of 2011, Busswil bei Melchnau had an unemployment rate of 0.16%. As of 2008, there were a total of 35 people employed in the municipality. Of these, there were 24 people employed in the primary economic sector and about 10 businesses involved in this sector. No one was employed in the secondary sector. 11 people were employed in the tertiary sector, with 5 businesses in this sector.

In 2008 there were a total of 23 full-time equivalent jobs. The number of jobs in the primary sector was 17, all of which were in agriculture. There were no jobs in the secondary sector. The number of jobs in the tertiary sector was 6 of which 2 were in wholesale or retail sales or the repair of motor vehicles and 1 was in a hotel or restaurant.

In 2000, there were 9 workers who commuted into the municipality and 66 workers who commuted away. The municipality is a net exporter of workers, with about 7.3 workers leaving the municipality for every one entering. Of the working population, 7.5% used public transportation to get to work, and 48.1% used a private car.

== Religion ==
From the 2000 census, 6 or 3.1% were Roman Catholic, while 165 or 84.6% belonged to the Swiss Reformed Church. Of the rest of the population, there were 12 individuals (or about 6.15% of the population) who belonged to another Christian church. There was 1 individual who was Islamic and 1 person who was Buddhist. 3 (or about 1.54% of the population) belonged to no church, are agnostic or atheist, and 13 individuals (or about 6.67% of the population) did not answer the question.

== Education ==
In Busswil bei Melchnau about 68 or (34.9%) of the population have completed non-mandatory upper secondary education, and 21 or (10.8%) have completed additional higher education (either university or a Fachhochschule). Of the 21 who completed tertiary schooling, 66.7% were Swiss men, 33.3% were Swiss women.

As of 2000, there were 17 students in Busswil bei Melchnau who came from another municipality, while 5 residents attended schools outside the municipality.
