= Langenthal =

- Municipality
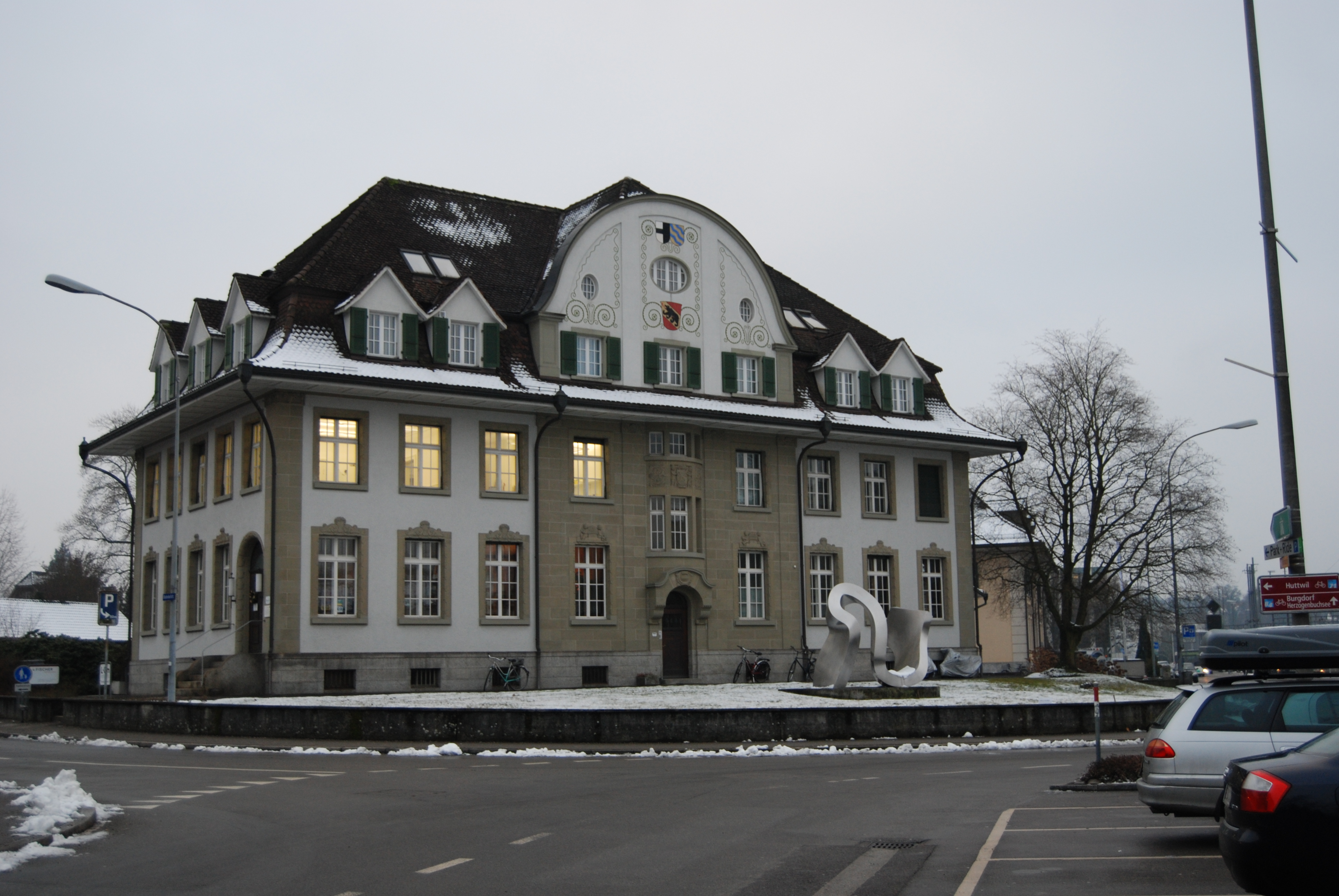
- Building in the old town of Langenthal

- Flag Coat of arms
- Location of Langenthal
- Location within Switzerland Location within Canton of Bern
- Coordinates: 47°13′N 7°47′E
- Country: Switzerland
- Canton: Bern
- District: Oberaargau

Government
  - Executive: Gemeinderat with 7 members
  - Mayor: Stadtpräsident (list); Thomas Rufener SVP/UDC (as of March 2014)
  - Parliament: Stadtrat with 40 members

Area
  - Total: 17.2 km^{2} (6.6 sq mi)
- Elevation: 481 m (1,578 ft)

Population (December 2020)
  - Total: 15,544
  - Density: 904/km^{2} (2,340/sq mi)
- Time zone: UTC+01:00 (CET)
  - Summer (DST): UTC+02:00 (CEST)
- Postal code: 4900-4902
- SFOS number: 329
- ISO 3166 code: CH-BE
- Surrounded by: Aarwangen, Bleienbach, Lotzwil, Obersteckholz, Roggwil, Thunstetten, Untersteckholz
- Twin towns: Brig-Glis (Switzerland), Neviano (Italy)
- Website: www.langenthal.ch

Langenthal is a town and a municipality in the district of Oberaargau in the canton of Bern in Switzerland. On 1 January 2010 the municipality of Untersteckholz merged into the Langenthal. On 1 January 2021 the former municipality of Obersteckholz merged into Langenthal.

Langenthal is an educational, cultural, and economic center for the region of Oberaargau.

== History ==
Aerial view by Walter Mittelholzer (1919)

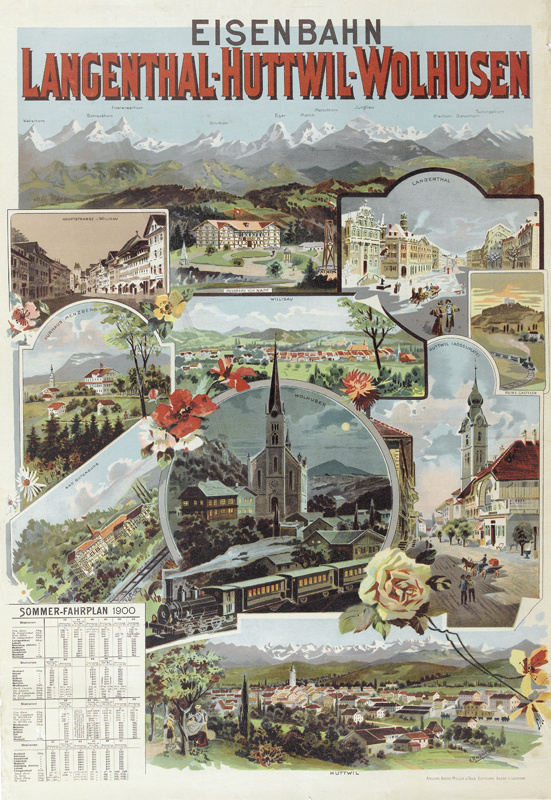
Poster from 1936 advertising the Langenthal-Huttwil-Wollhusen railway

Archeological evidence suggests that early settlements existed around 4000 B.C. in the Langenthal area. A Hallstatt necropolis with twelve grave mounds has been found at Unterhard. Remnants of two Roman villae have also been identified.

Langenthal is first mentioned in 861, as marcha in Langatun, referring to farming estates scattered along the Langete (a tributary of the Murg). The Old High German name Langatun is presumably composed of a hydronym langa- and the Gaulish element dunum "fort" (which had become productive as a suffix in toponyms). The re-interpretation of the name as including the element -tal "valley" dates to c. the 15th century, during which the name is on record as either Langaten or Langental (the same process can be observed in the case of Murgenthal, earlier Murgatun).

In the 12th century Langenthal (now known as Langaton) belonged to the territory of the lords of Langenstein. In 1194 the Freiherr founded the Abbey of St. Urban and endowed the Abbey with lands in Langenthal. Formerly part of Thunstetten parish, Langenthal was granted its own parish church in 1197. After the extinction of the Langenstein family in 1212, the Abbey inherited additional lands in the area. The establishment of the Abbey brought agricultural improvements, especially the introduction of an irrigation system to the area. However, the Abbey often came into conflict with the Kyburg Ministerialis (unfree knights in the service of a feudal overlord) family of Luternau. The Luternau family fought the growing power of the Abbey, until 1273-76 when they were obligated to sell their interest in Langenthal to the Abbey. Just a few years later, in 1279, the Abbey, in turn, was forced to give the low court and a fortified house in Langenthal to the Freiherr of Grünenberg to hold as a fief. By the end of the 14th century, the Abbey had regained power and was able to bring the village fully under their control.

Starting in 1313 the Kyburgs held the high court right for the village. When that family died out in 1406, Bern inherited the right to hold the high court. Over the next few years Bern's power expanded in Langenthal. In 1415, Langenthal became incorporated into the territory of the Republic of Bern, but it remained under the landlordship and the low court of the monastery. Over the following centuries, the Bernese court slowly eliminated many of the Abbey's powers. The Protestant Reformation of 1528 weakened the power of the Abbey slightly, but it continued to collect tithes and appoint the village priest until Bern bought those rights in 1808.

During the 16th century a number of craftsmen and small businesses moved into the growing town. In 1571 Bern granted the right for the town to hold two yearly markets. However, the supply of goods for sale quickly exceeded the capacity of the two yearly markets. In 1613 they built a Kaufhaus or market building and started holding weekly markets. The Kaufhaus was rebuilt in 1808 and from 1894 until 1992 served as the town hall. By 1616 Langenthal had a series of laws and regulations governing the booming markets and trade in the town. In 1640 Langenthal and Langnau became centers of linen canvas production and export to France, Italy, Spain and Portugal. In 1704 Langenthal became the seat of the Oberaargau canvas dealer's guild, which brought together weavers, shopkeepers and traders to protect their interests. The decline of eastern Switzerland's linen industry in the 18th century gave Langenthal a further boost, which encouraged to Bern to tighten supervision. Beginning in 1758 the Bernese government started inspecting cloth for quality and controlling who was allowed to sell.

The success of the linen trade helped the town to grow. Even though the Aargau cantonal road bypassed the Langenthal, by 1756 it had grown to a total of 189 households, three taverns, various administrative buildings and a warehouse (dated 1748). The market street was paved in 1730 and the Langete was partially covered with stone bridges and new houses. In 1785 a brewery opened in town. A small elite of merchants, lawyers, physicians and pharmacists emerged and turned Langenthal into a center of the liberal and nationalist thought during the early modern era. Langenthal had been a subject territory of Berne within the Old Swiss Confederacy since 1415, and tended to support uprisings against the central authorities; during the Swiss peasant war of 1653 Langenthal had supported the peasant uprising, as well as the 1798 French invasion and the liberal Helvetic Republic. The current municipal coat of arms, three wavy bands in blue on yellow (Or three Bends wavy Azure), has been in use since c. 1870, replacing an earlier design in red and silver, but the use of a flag with a similar design, "yellow and blue with a triple rivulet" (Sie führen einen Fahnen ist gälb und blaw / In dreyfachen Bach darinnen) is recorded in a song of c. 1700.

Langenthal's location on the road from Bern to Zurich (completed in 1760) and on the Swiss Central Railway line (inaugurated in 1857) spurred industrial development, led by textiles and machines. Municipal water supply was introduced in 1894 and an electric utility began operating in 1896. In 1898, the formerly neighboring municipality of Schoren was incorporated into Langenthal. Langenthal had a population of 1,327 in 1764; population grew to 2,738 by 1850, and to 4,799 by 1900. In the 20th century, Langenthal became known for its porcelain manufacture. Langenthal reached a population of 10,000 in 1957, further growing to 13,000 by 1970. The municipality has been officially referring to itself as a town (Stadt) since 1997. In 2001, Langenthal was twinned with the town of Neviano in southern Italy and with Brig-Glis in the upper Valais. In 2010, the municipality of Untersteckholz was incorporated into Langenthal.

=== Obersteckholz ===
Obersteckholz is first mentioned in 1255 as Stechcholz.

Obersteckholz was the property of the Baron of Langenstein. In 1194, he founded St. Urban's Abbey and granted the village to the Abbey as part of its endowment. It was part of the Abbey's court of Langenthal until 1406 when it became part of the Bernese bailiwick of Wangen. Following the 1798 French invasion it became part of the district of Langenthal under the Helvetic Republic. In 1803, after the collapse of the Republic, it became part of the Aarwangen District. The village became an independent municipality in 1831. Until 1790 and again after 1975 Obersteckholz and Untersteckholz shared a single school district.

== Geography ==
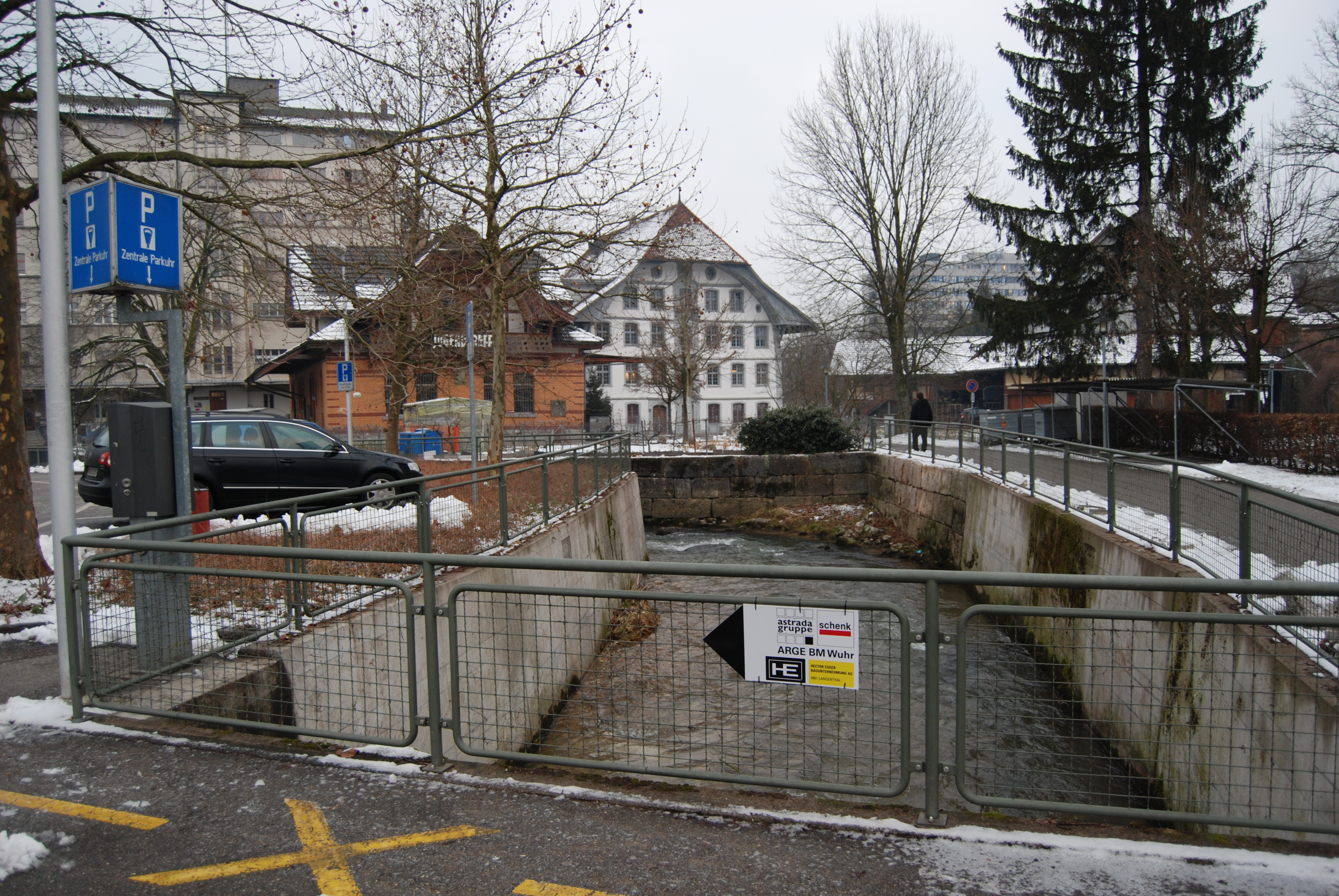
The Langete

After the merger, Langenthal has an area of 21.13 km^{2} (8.16 sq mi). Of this area, 3.43 km^{2} (1.32 mi^{2}) or 23.8% is used for agricultural purposes, while 6 km^{2} (2.3 mi^{2}) or 41.6% is forested. Of the rest of the land, 4.96 km^{2} (1.92 mi^{2}) or 34.4% is settled (buildings or roads), 0.04 km^{2} (9.9 acres) or 0.3% is either rivers or lakes.

Of the built up area, industrial buildings made up 5.1% of the total area while housing and buildings made up 17.8% and transportation infrastructure made up 8.0%. while parks, green belts and sports fields made up 2.9%. Out of the forested land, 40.5% of the total land area is heavily forested and 1.1% is covered with orchards or small clusters of trees. Of the agricultural land, 16.6% is used for growing crops and 6.2% is pastures. All the water in the municipality is flowing water.

Untersteckholz had an area, as of 2009, of 2.83 km^{2} (1.09 sq mi). Of this area, 2.09 km^{2} (0.81 sq mi) or 73.9% is used for agricultural purposes, while 0.59 km^{2} (0.23 sq mi) or 20.8% is forested. Of the rest of the land, 0.16 km^{2} (0.062 sq mi) or 5.7% is settled (buildings or roads).

Of the built up area, housing and buildings made up 2.1% and transportation infrastructure made up 3.2%. 17.7% of the total land area is heavily forested and 3.2% is covered with orchards or small clusters of trees. Of the agricultural land, 56.5% is used for growing crops and 14.1% is pastures, while 3.2% is used for orchards or vine crops.

The municipality is the largest settlement in the Langetental (Langeten Valley) and since 1997 it has been considered a city. It consists of the old village of Langenthal, numerous expansions of the village core, the village of Schoren and since 2010, Untersteckholz.

== Coat of Arms ==
The blazon for the municipal coat of arms is bendy wavy Or and Azure.

== Demographics ==
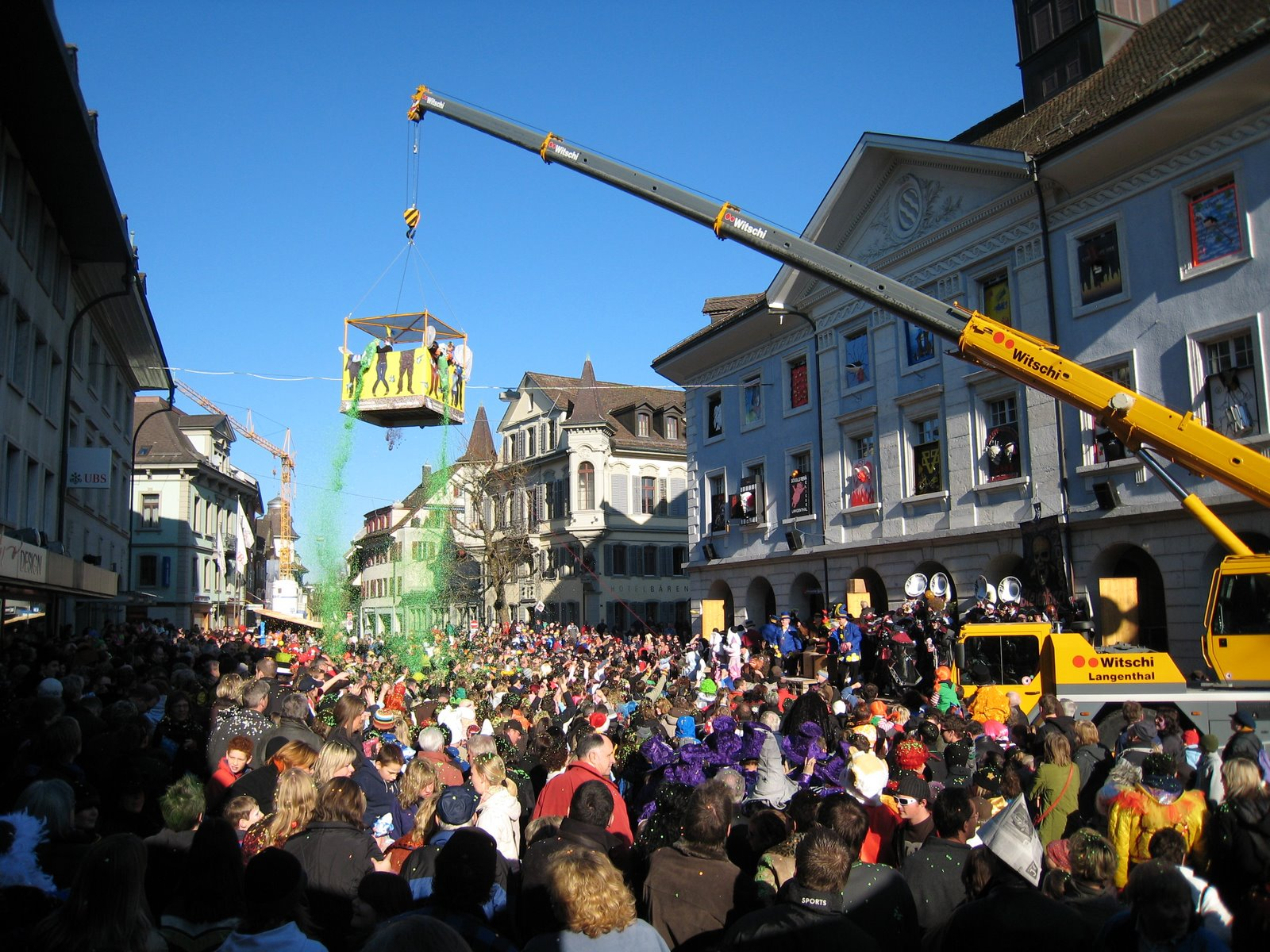
Fasnacht celebration in Langenthal

Langenthal has a population (as of December 2020) of 15,544. As of 2010, 19.9% of the population are resident foreign nationals. Over the last 10 years (2000–2010) the population has changed at a rate of 5.3%. Migration accounted for 8%, while births and deaths accounted for -0.7%.

Most of the population (as of 2000) speaks German (11,994 or 85.2%) as their first language, Italian is the second most common (484 or 3.4%) and Serbo-Croatian is the third (297 or 2.1%). There are 108 people who speak French and 5 people who speak Romansh.

As of 2008, the population was 48.6% male and 51.4% female. The population was made up of 5,672 Swiss men (38.0% of the population) and 1,583 (10.6%) non-Swiss men. There were 6,299 Swiss women (42.2%) and 1,384 (9.3%) non-Swiss women. Of the population in the municipality, 4,139 or about 29.4% were born in Langenthal and lived there in 2000. There were 4,236 or 30.1% who were born in the same canton, while 2,618 or 18.6% were born somewhere else in Switzerland, and 2,674 or 19.0% were born outside of Switzerland.

As of 2010, children and teenagers (0–19 years old) make up 19.7% of the population, while adults (20–64 years old) make up 61.6% and seniors (over 64 years old) make up 18.7%.

As of 2000, there were 5,805 people who were single and never married in the municipality. There were 6,633 married individuals, 941 widows or widowers and 699 individuals who are divorced.

As of 2000, there were 2,277 households that consist of only one person and 365 households with five or more people. In 2000, a total of 6,080 apartments (91.2% of the total) were permanently occupied, while 327 apartments (4.9%) were seasonally occupied and 261 apartments (3.9%) were empty. As of 2010, the construction rate of new housing units was 6.2 new units per 1000 residents. The vacancy rate for the municipality, in 2011, was 1.2%.

The historical population is given in the following chart:

== Heritage sites of national significance ==
The old Kaufhaus (market building), Old Mill, and the archeological site at Unterhard are listed as Swiss heritage site of national significance. The old village of Langenthal and the hamlet of Chlyrot are part of the Inventory of Swiss Heritage Sites.

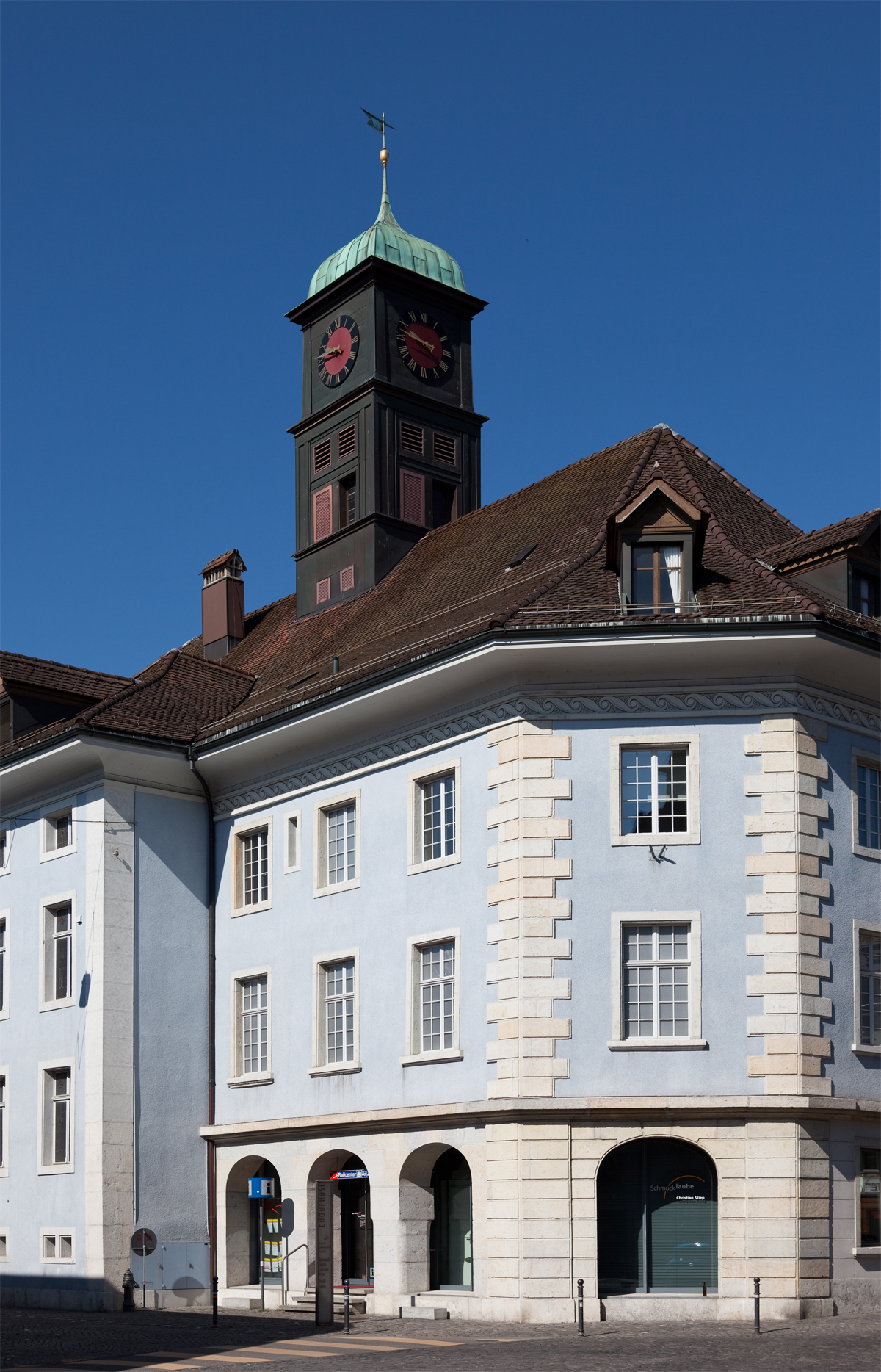
Kaufhaus

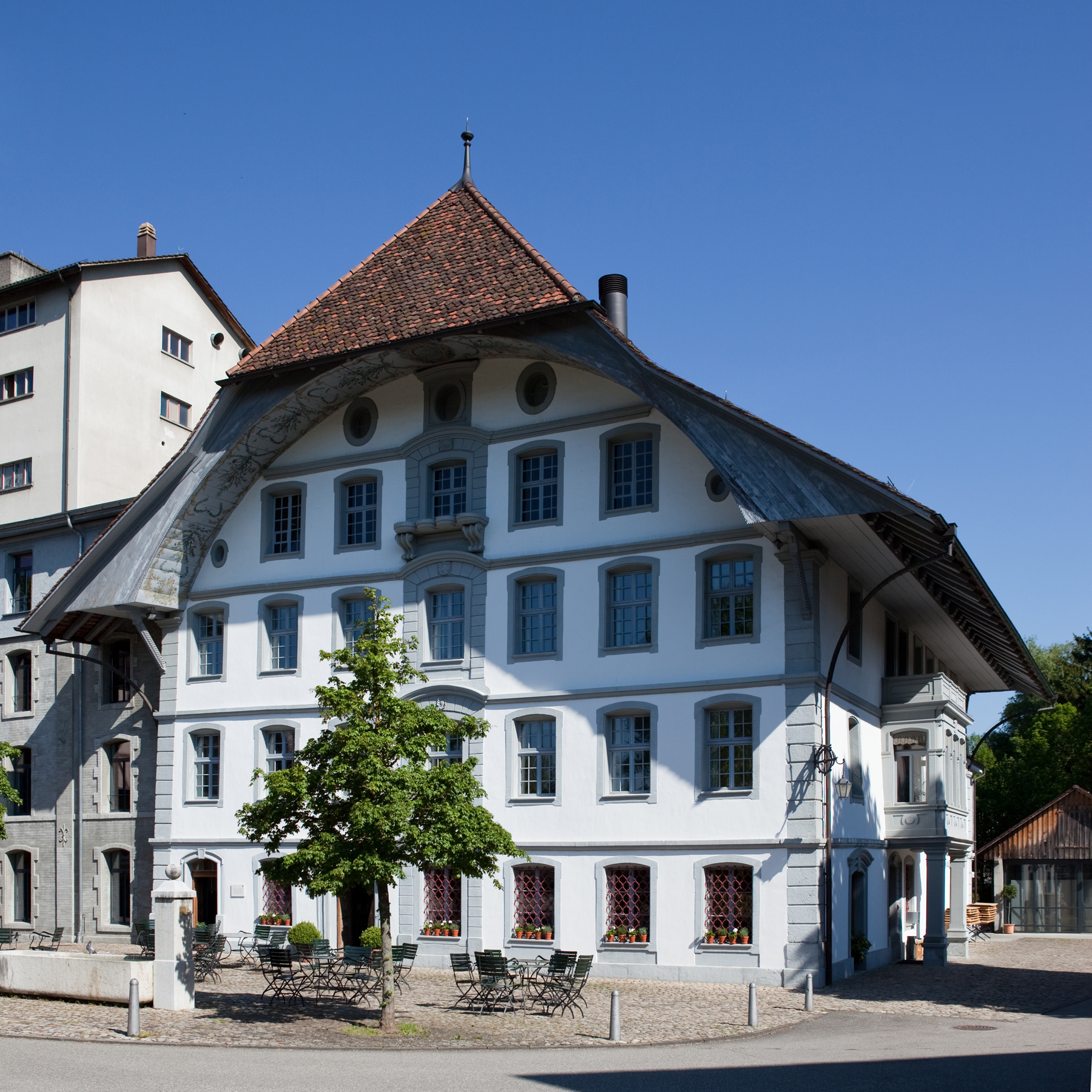
Old Mill

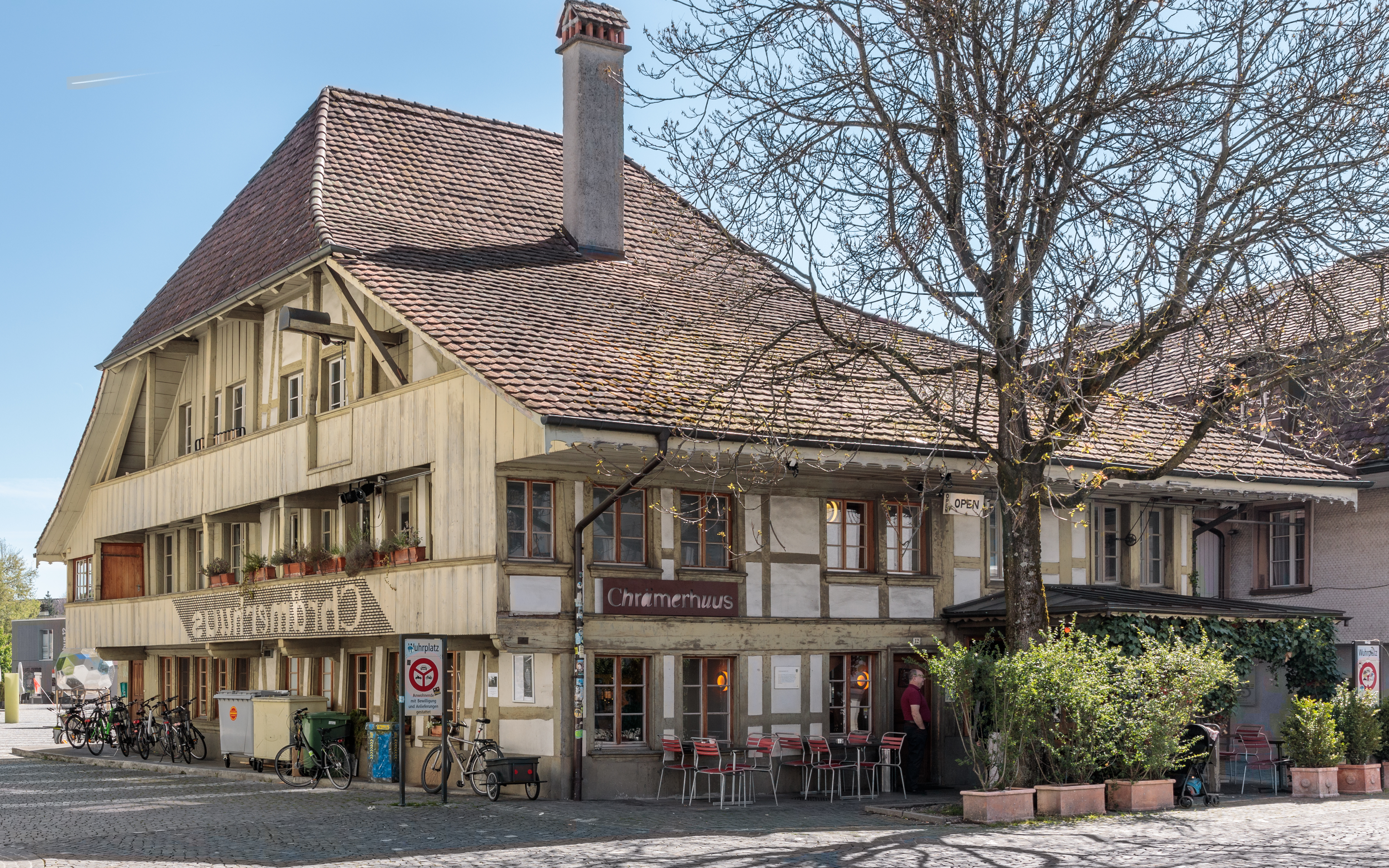
"Chrämerhuus"

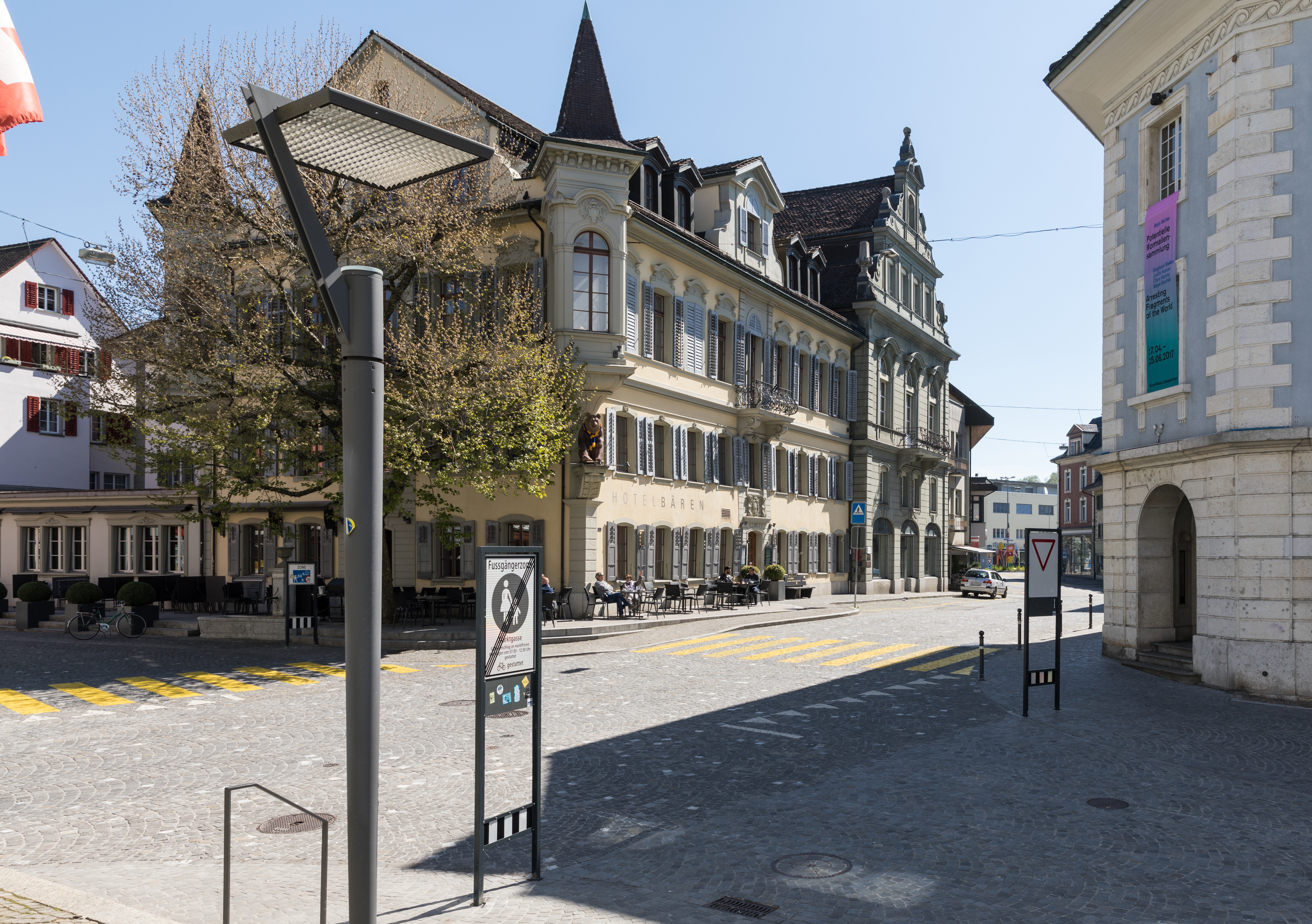
Hotel "Bären"

== Politics ==
In the 2011 federal election the most popular party was the SPS which received 22.7% of the vote. The next three most popular parties were the SVP (22.5%), the FDP (16.7%) and the BDP Party (12.1%). In the federal election, a total of 4,833 votes were cast, and the voter turnout was 47.1%.

== Economy ==
Langenthal is an economic and industrial center of regional importance, and the seat of companies including Ammann Group (construction vehicles), Motorex Bucher (lubricants), KADI AG (food), a Ruckstuhl (textile flooring), Lantal Textiles, Création Baumann (textiles).

As of 2011, Langenthal had an unemployment rate of 2.52%. As of 2008, there were a total of 10,745 people employed in the municipality. Of these, there were 76 people employed in the primary economic sector and about 21 businesses involved in this sector. 3,619 people were employed in the secondary sector and there were 149 businesses in this sector. 7,050 people were employed in the tertiary sector, with 658 businesses in this sector.

In 2008 there were a total of 9,065 full-time equivalent jobs. The number of jobs in the primary sector was 32, of which 28 were in agriculture and 4 were in forestry or lumber production. The number of jobs in the secondary sector was 3,398 of which 2,412 or (71.0%) were in manufacturing and 829 (24.4%) were in construction. The number of jobs in the tertiary sector was 5,635. In the tertiary sector; 2,119 or 37.6% were in wholesale or retail sales or the repair of motor vehicles, 317 or 5.6% were in the movement and storage of goods, 259 or 4.6% were in a hotel or restaurant, 152 or 2.7% were in the information industry, 303 or 5.4% were the insurance or financial industry, 453 or 8.0% were technical professionals or scientists, 317 or 5.6% were in education and 1,170 or 20.8% were in health care.

In 2000, there were 6,627 workers who commuted into the municipality and 3,101 workers who commuted away. The municipality is a net importer of workers, with about 2.1 workers entering the municipality for every one leaving. Of the working population, 16.5% used public transportation to get to work, and 43.5% used a private car.

== Religion ==
From the 2000 census, 2,610 or 18.5% were Roman Catholic, while 8,338 or 59.2% belonged to the Swiss Reformed Church. Of the rest of the population, 281 (2.00%) were members of an Orthodox church, 14 individuals (0.10%) who belonged to the Christian Catholic Church, and 919 individuals (6.53%) adhered to some other Christian church; 847 individuals (6.02%) were Muslim 158 individuals were Hindu, 66 individuals were Buddhist and 2 individuals (0.01%) were Jewish. 8 individuals adhered to some other non-Christian religious group. 794 (or about 5.64% of the population) were non-religious, and 494 individuals (or about 3.51% of the population) refused to state their religious adherence.

The local Muslim community was at the time in the process of planning a minaret for their "cultural centre" in 2009. This was one of the cases that fuelled the Minaret controversy in Switzerland which resulted in a successful vote on a proposed ban of minarets in November 2009. In 2012, a local court ruled against the construction plans on reasons unrelated to the minaret ban (on purely technical grounds of construction laws). For some time, it seemed as if the Langenthal minaret would be the first case where the new minaret ban would be taken to court, the Langenthal Muslim community announcing to the press that they were going to appeal to the Federal Supreme Court of Switzerland and if necessary further to the European Court of Human Rights in Strasbourg, but they dropped the issue in 2012.

== Education ==
In Langenthal about 5,541 or (39.4%) of the population have completed non-mandatory upper secondary education, and 1,733 or (12.3%) have completed additional higher education (either university or a Fachhochschule). Of the 1,733 who completed tertiary schooling, 66.2% were Swiss men, 22.0% were Swiss women, 7.4% were non-Swiss men and 4.4% were non-Swiss women.

The Canton of Bern school system provides one year of non-obligatory Kindergarten, followed by six years of Primary school. This is followed by three years of obligatory lower Secondary school where the students are separated according to ability and aptitude. Following the lower Secondary students may attend additional schooling or they may enter an apprenticeship.

During the 2009–10 school year, there were a total of 1,917 students attending classes in Langenthal. There were 12 kindergarten classes with a total of 241 students in the municipality. Of the kindergarten students, 26.6% were permanent or temporary residents of Switzerland (not citizens) and 39.8% have a different mother language than the classroom language. The municipality had 44 primary classes and 789 students. Of the primary students, 28.6% were permanent or temporary residents of Switzerland (not citizens) and 39.9% have a different mother language than the classroom language. During the same year, there were 38 lower secondary classes with a total of 654 students. There were 19.1% who were permanent or temporary residents of Switzerland (not citizens) and 25.8% have a different mother language than the classroom language.

As of 2000, there were 1,031 students in Langenthal who came from another municipality, while 172 residents attended schools outside the municipality.

Langenthal is home to the Regionalbibliothek Langenthal library. The library has (as of 2008) 35,496 books or other media, and loaned out 267,662 items in the same year. It was open a total of 304 days with average of 35 hours per week during that year.

== Transportation ==
The municipality has four railway stations: Langenthal, Langenthal Süd, Langenthal Gaswerk, and Langenthal Industrie Nord. The first of these is a major interchange, with regular service to Zürich Hauptbahnhof, Bern, Solothurn, Baden, Lucerne, and Olten. Langenthal Süd is located south of Langenthal on the way to Lucerne. The latter two are narrow-gauge stations on the various lines operated by Aare Seeland mobil.

== Sport ==
The city is home to the SC Langenthal which plays in the Swiss League. Their home arena is the Schoren which has a seating capacity of 4,500.

== Notable people ==
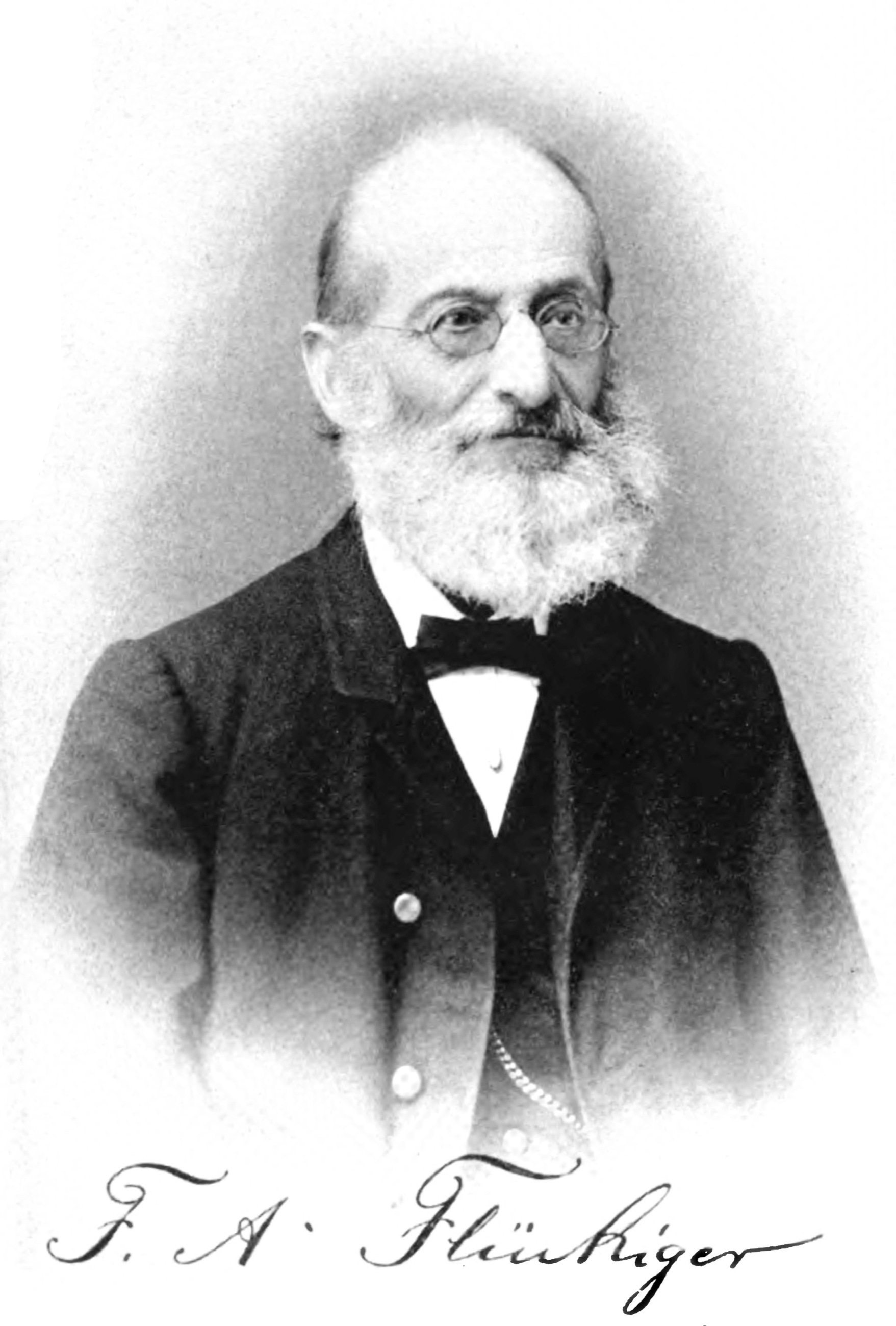
Friedrich August Flückiger, 1893

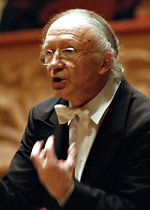
Heinz Holliger

- Friedrich August Flückiger (1828 in Langenthal - 1894), Swiss pharmacist, chemist and botanist
- Carl Friedrich Geiser (1843 in Langenthal – 1934), mathematician, specializing in algebraic geometry
- Emma Graf (1865 in Langenthal – 1926), historian, teacher, suffragist
- Karl Jaberg (1877 in Langenthal – 1958), Swiss linguist and dialectologist
- Friedrich Born (1903 in Langenthal – 1963), ICRC diplomat, credited with rescuing between 11,000 and 15,000 Jews in Budapest
- Adrian Aeschbacher (1912 in Langenthal – 2002), Swiss classical pianist
- Heinz Holliger (born 1939 in Langenthal) oboist, composer and conductor
- Johann Schneider-Ammann (born 1952) businessman and politician, member of the Swiss National Council, lives in Langenthal
- Cornelia Meyer (born 1959 in Langenthal), international economist, independent energy analyst and media commentator.
- Pedro Lenz (born 1965 in Langenthal), Swiss writer

Sport

- Fritz Scheidegger (1930 in Langenthal - 1967), Swiss sidecar racer, won two Sidecar World Championships.
- Christophe Bühler (born 1974 in Langenthal), Swiss former sprint freestyle swimmer, competed in the 2000 Summer Olympics
- Stefan Grogg (born 1974), ice hockey player; member of the Swiss Men's National Team 1997
- Bruno Sutter (born 1977 in Langenthal), Swiss footballer, over 300 club caps, plays for FC Vaduz
- Rémo Meyer (born 1980), football player, over 220 club caps
- Fabienne Meyer (born 1981), Swiss former bobsledder, competed in the 2010 and 2014 Winter Olympics
- Thomas Reinmann (born 1983 in Langenthal), former Swiss football defender, over 275 club caps
- Sven Bärtschi (born 1992), ice hockey player
- Carole Howald (born 1993 in Langenthal), Swiss female curler
