= Aarwangen District =

Coordinates: 47.2333°N 7.76667°E

Aarwangen District Amtsbezirk Aarwangen
- District
- Flag Coat of arms

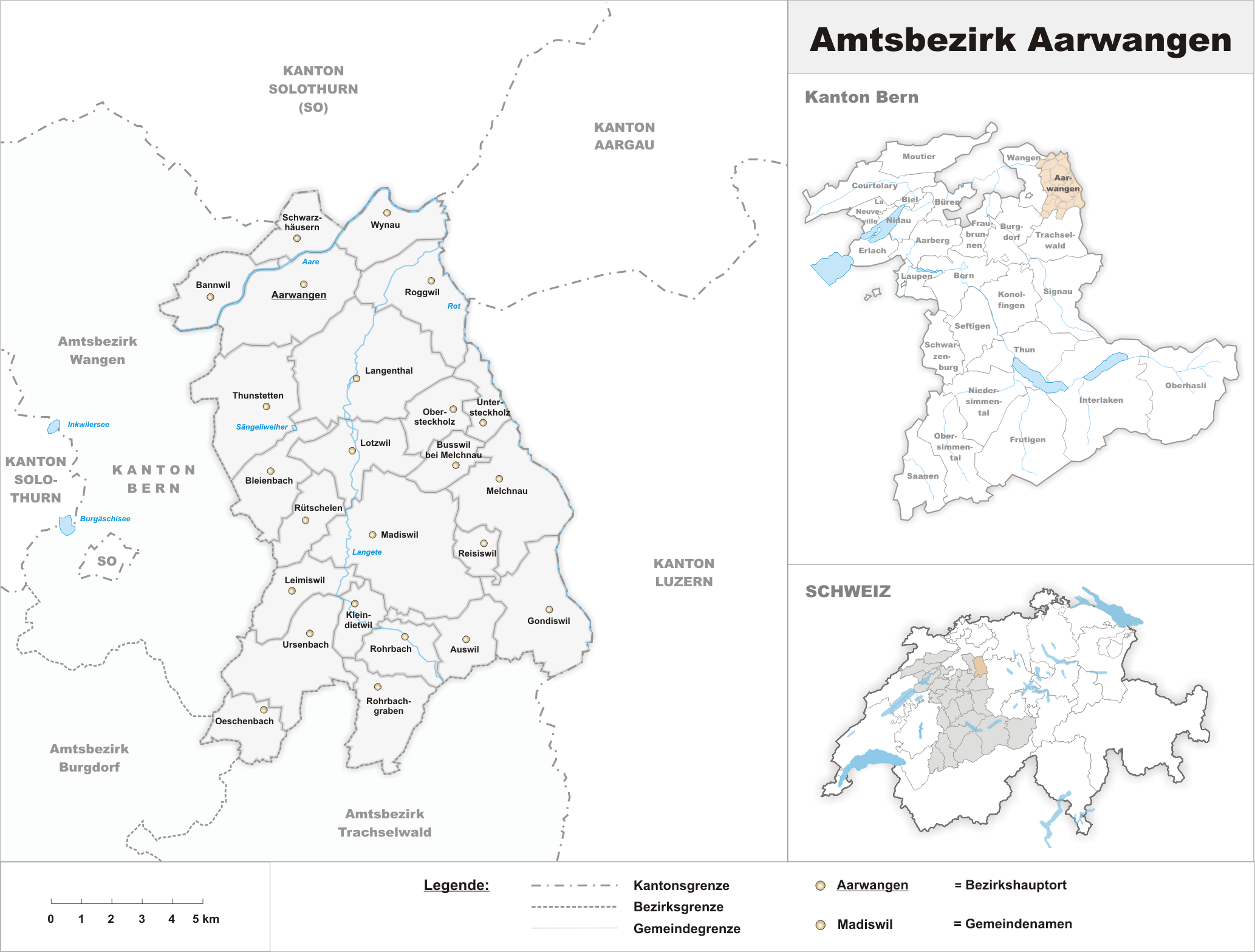
- Country: Switzerland
- Canton: Bern
- Capital: Aarwangen

Area
  - Total: 154 km^{2} (59 sq mi)

Population (2007)
  - Total: 41,526
  - Density: 270/km^{2} (698/sq mi)
- Time zone: UTC+1 (CET)
  - Summer (DST): UTC+2 (CEST)
- Municipalities: 24

Aarwangen District is a constitutional district in the northeast corner of the canton of Bern in Switzerland, with its seat at Aarwangen. From 1 January 2010, the district lost its administrative power. Since 2010, it remains a fully recognised district under the law and the Constitution (Art.3 al.2) of the Canton of Berne. Its municipalities became part of the administrative region Emmental-Oberaargau.

It is surrounded by the canton of Solothurn on the north, the canton of Aargau on the northeast, the canton of Lucerne on the east, the district of Trachselwald on the south, the district of Burgdorf on the southwest, and the district of Wangen on the west. It has an area of 154 km^{2} (59 sq mi).

== Municipalities ==
As of 29 November 2022, Aarwangen District includes the following 20 municipalities:

- CH-4912 Aarwangen
- CH-4944 Auswil
- CH-4913 Bannwil
- CH-3368 Bleienbach
- CH-4917 Busswil bei Melchnau
- CH-4955 Gondiswil
- CH-4900 Langenthal
- CH-4932 Lotzwil
- CH-4934 Madiswil
- CH-4917 Melchnau
- CH-4943 Oeschenbach
- CH-4919 Reisiswil
- CH-4914 Roggwil
- CH-4938 Rohrbach
- CH-4938 Rohrbachgraben
- CH-4933 Rütschelen
- CH-4911 Schwarzhäusern
- CH-4922 Thunstetten
- CH-4937 Ursenbach
- CH-4923 Wynau
