= Reisiswil =

- Municipality
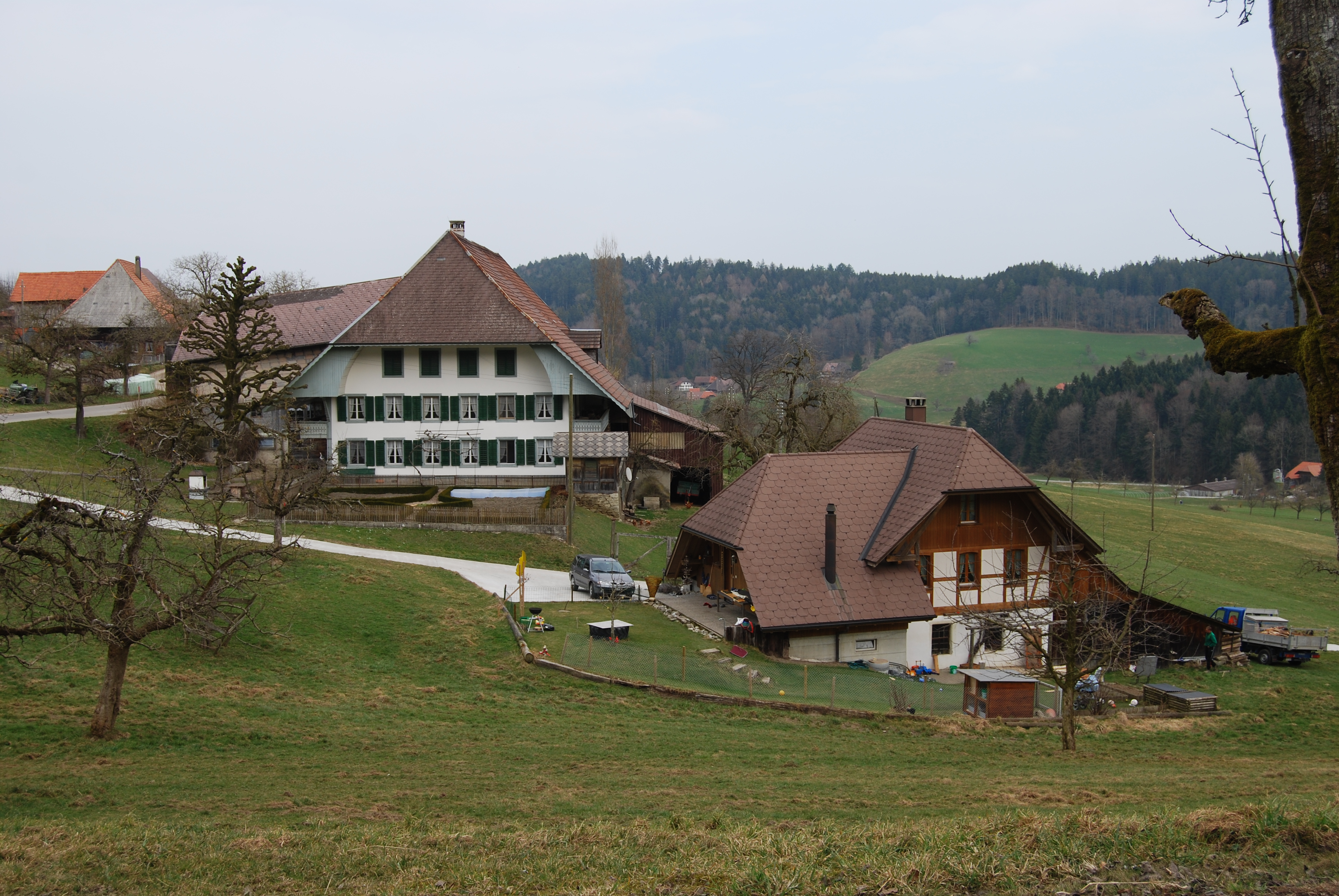

- Flag Coat of arms
- Location of Reisiswil
- Location within Switzerland Location within Canton of Bern
- Coordinates: 47°10′N 7°51′E
- Country: Switzerland
- Canton: Bern
- District: Oberaargau

Area
  - Total: 2.00 km^{2} (0.77 sq mi)
- Elevation: 645 m (2,116 ft)

Population (December 2020)
  - Total: 173
  - Density: 86.5/km^{2} (224/sq mi)
- Time zone: UTC+01:00 (CET)
  - Summer (DST): UTC+02:00 (CEST)
- Postal code: 4919
- SFOS number: 336
- ISO 3166 code: CH-BE
- Surrounded by: Gondiswil, Madiswil, Melchnau
- Website: reisiswil.ch

Reisiwil is a municipality in the Oberaargau administrative district in the canton of Bern in Switzerland.

== History ==
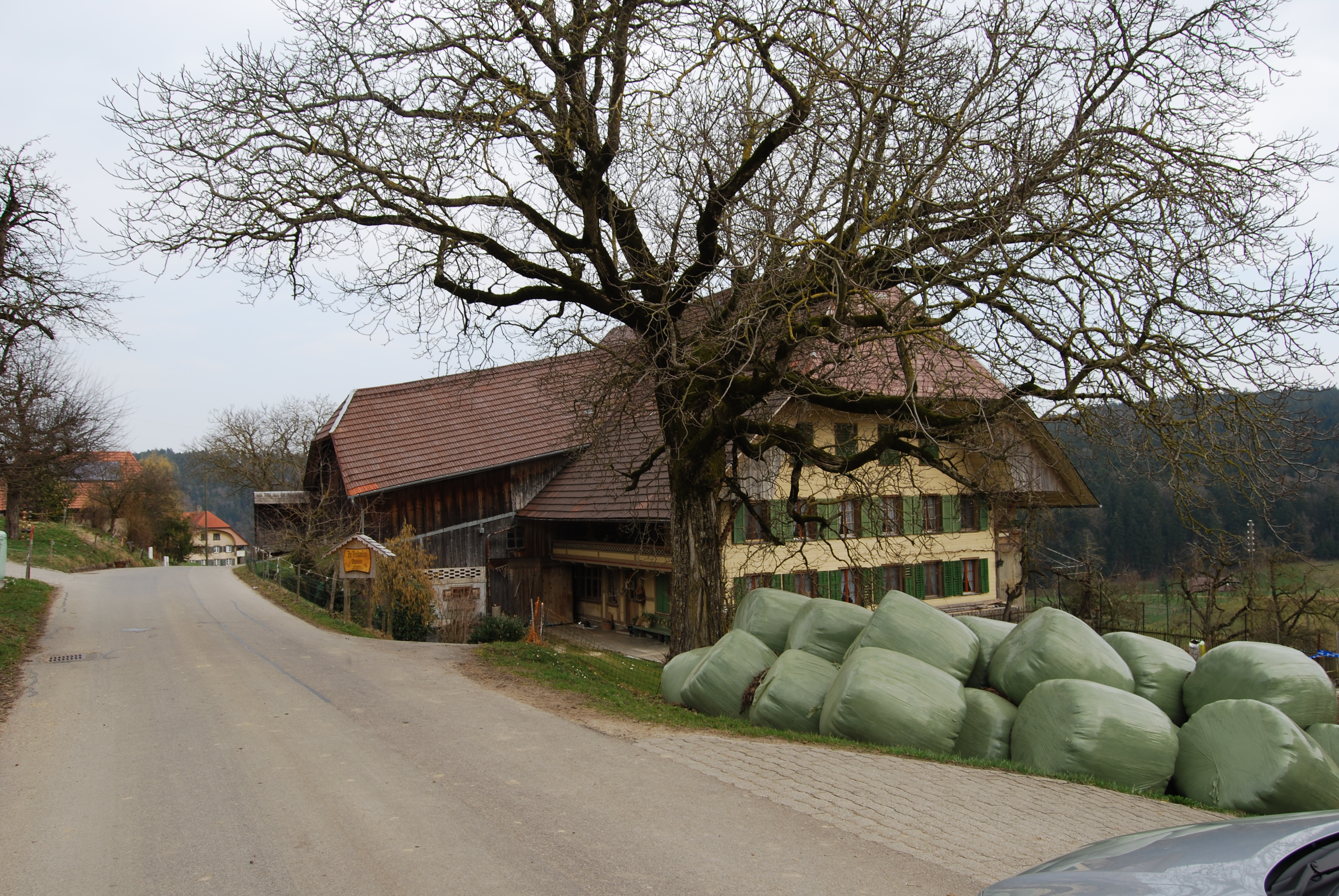
Rural farmhouses in Reisiswil

Reisiswil is first mentioned in 1194 as Richolsiswillare.

Reisiswil was part of the lands of the Counts of Langenstein-Grünenberg. Some land in the village was given in the 12th century to St. Urban's Abbey, while the Abbey of St. Gall became a major landholder as well. The St. Gallen properties were managed by the Counts of Grünenberg. With the extinction of the Grünenberg line, Bern inherited the village in 1504. After the 1798 French invasion, it became part of the municipality of Melchnau. It separated to become an independent municipality in 1815.

During the 19th century the population grew as people found jobs in straw plaiting and horse hair spinning to supplement the income from agriculture. However, in the 20th century, the population declined as residents emigrated in search of jobs as agriculture became less manpower intensive. In 2005, agriculture still provides about 70% of the jobs in the municipality.

== Geography ==
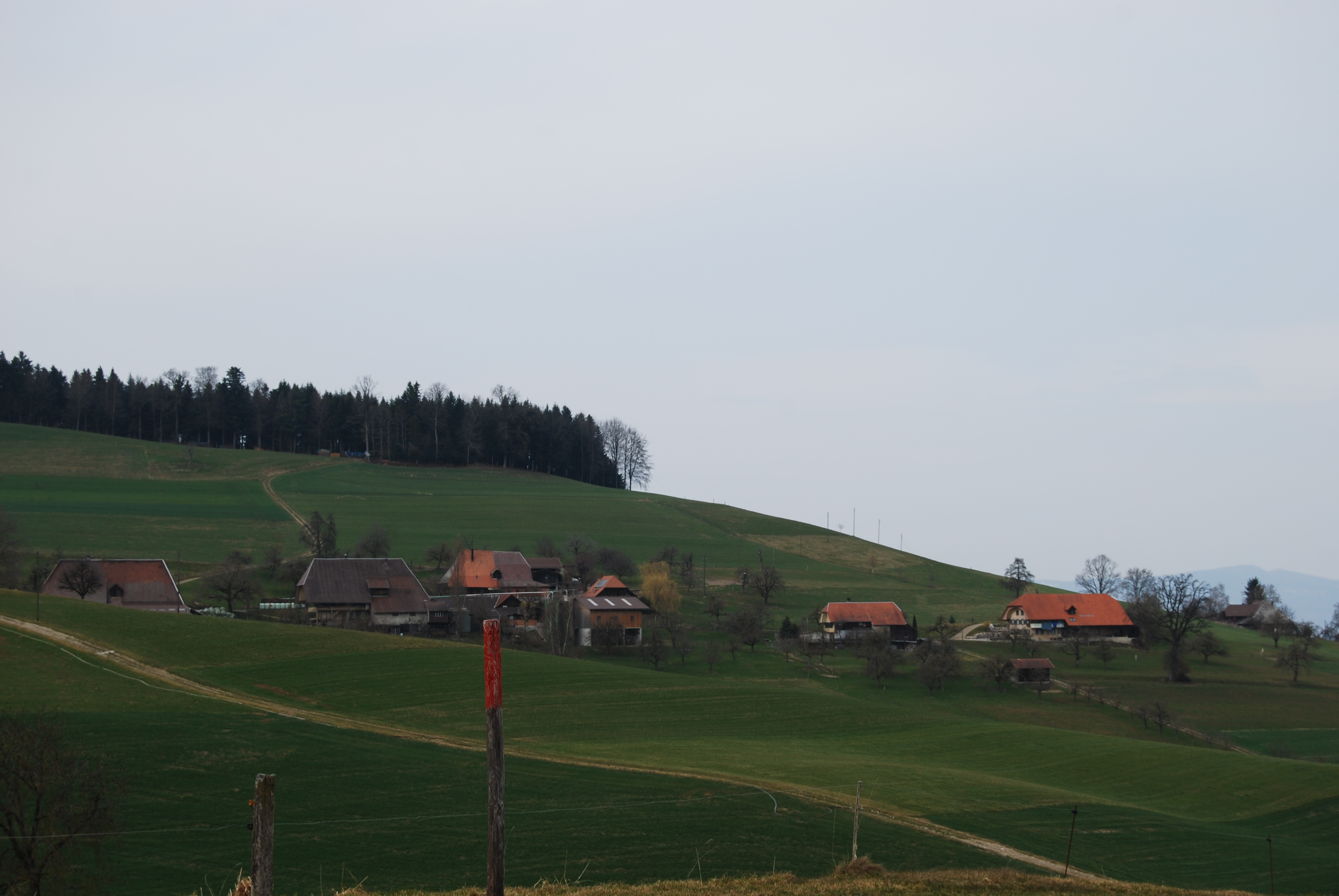
Countryside around Reisiswil

Reisiswil has an area of 2.01 km^{2} (0.78 sq mi). Of this area, 1.27 km^{2} (0.49 mi^{2}) or 63.2% is used for agricultural purposes, while 0.59 km^{2} (0.23 mi^{2}) or 29.4% is forested. Of the rest of the land, 0.1 km^{2} (25 acres) or 5.0% is settled (buildings or roads), 0.01 km^{2} (2.5 acres) or 0.5% is either rivers or lakes.

Of the built up area, housing and buildings made up 3.0% and transportation infrastructure made up 1.0%. Out of the forested land, all of the forested land area is covered with heavy forests. Of the agricultural land, 29.4% is used for growing crops and 28.9% is pastures, while 5.0% is used for orchards or vine crops. All the water in the municipality is flowing water.

The municipality is located in hilly country in the Oberaargau region. The elevation in the municipality varies from 640–782 m (2,100–2,566 ft). It consists of the village of Reisiswil and scattered hamlets including Gstell, Gemeindeweid and Adlihubel.

On 31 December 2009 Amtsbezirk Aarwangen, the municipality's former district, was dissolved. On the following day, 1 January 2010, it joined the newly created Verwaltungskreis Oberaargau.

== Coat of arms ==
The blazon of the municipal coat of arms is Argent a Torch Sable incensed Gules issuant from a Mount of 3 Coupeaux Vert.

== Demographics ==
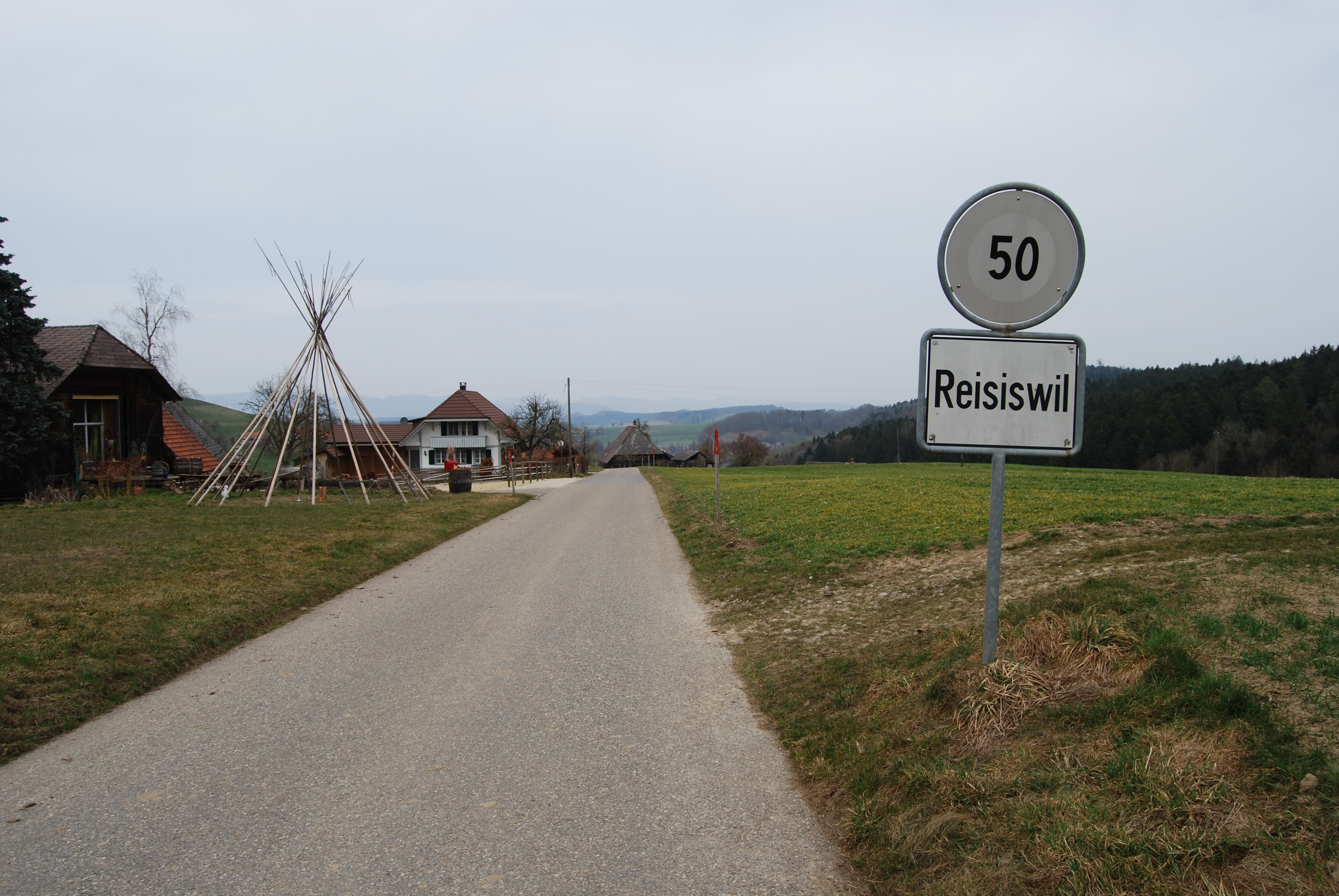
Entrance into the village

Reisiswil has a population (as of December 2020) of 173. As of 2010, 8.7% of the population are resident foreign nationals. Over the last 10 years (2000-2010) the population has changed at a rate of -3%. Migration accounted for -6.5%, while births and deaths accounted for 3%.

Most of the population (as of 2000) speaks German (188 or 95.4%) as their first language, French is the second most common (4 or 2.0%) and Albanian is the third (2 or 1.0%).

As of 2008, the population was 48.7% male and 51.3% female. The population was made up of 85 Swiss men (43.6% of the population) and 10 (5.1%) non-Swiss men. There were 93 Swiss women (47.7%) and 7 (3.6%) non-Swiss women. Of the population in the municipality, 83 or about 42.1% were born in Reisiswil and lived there in 2000. There were 59 or 29.9% who were born in the same canton, while 41 or 20.8% were born somewhere else in Switzerland, and 12 or 6.1% were born outside of Switzerland.

As of 2010, children and teenagers (0–19 years old) make up 23.6% of the population, while adults (20–64 years old) make up 61% and seniors (over 64 years old) make up 15.4%.

As of 2000, there were 87 people who were single and never married in the municipality. There were 95 married individuals, 13 widows or widowers and 2 individuals who are divorced.

As of 2000, there were 21 households that consist of only one person and 10 households with five or more people. In 2000, a total of 74 apartments (86.0% of the total) were permanently occupied, while 5 apartments (5.8%) were seasonally occupied and 7 apartments (8.1%) were empty. The vacancy rate for the municipality, in 2011, was 2.17%.

The historical population is given in the following chart:

== Politics ==
In the 2011 federal election the most popular party was the SVP which received 67.8% of the vote. The next three most popular parties were the BDP Party (12.4%), the SPS (4.2%) and the EDU Party (3.8%). In the federal election, a total of 78 votes were cast, and the voter turnout was 49.4%.

== Economy ==
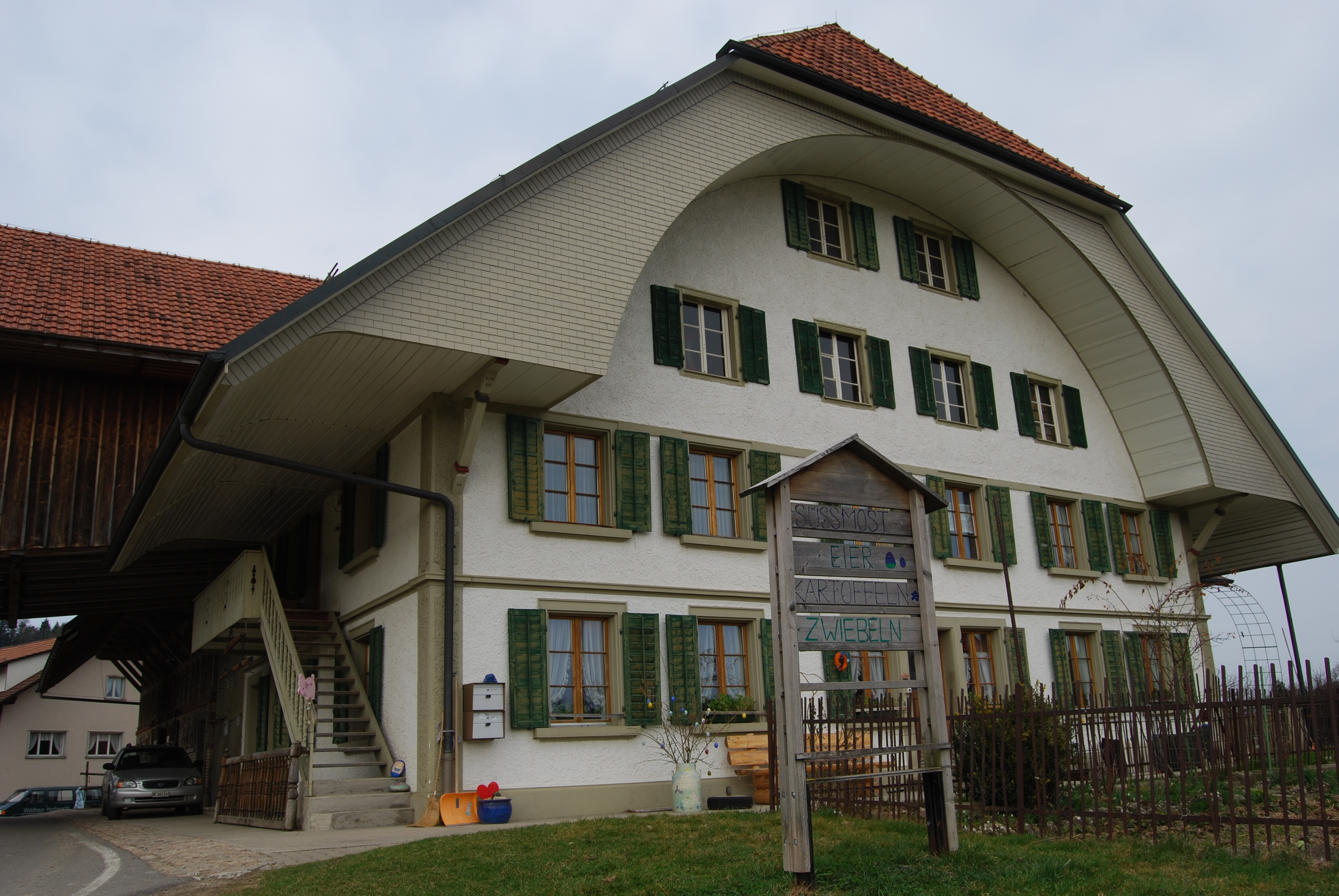
Farm house in Reisiswil with a sign in front advertising food for sale

As of 2011, Reisiswil had an unemployment rate of 0.68%. As of 2008, there were a total of 65 people employed in the municipality. Of these, there were 31 people employed in the primary economic sector and about 10 businesses involved in this sector. No one was employed in the secondary sector. 34 people were employed in the tertiary sector, with 10 businesses in this sector.

In 2008 there were a total of 43 full-time equivalent jobs. The number of jobs in the primary sector was 21, of which 18 were in agriculture and 2 were in forestry or lumber production. There were no jobs in the secondary sector. The number of jobs in the tertiary sector was 22. In the tertiary sector; 5 or 22.7% were in wholesale or retail sales or the repair of motor vehicles, 6 or 27.3% were in the movement and storage of goods, 6 or 27.3% were in a hotel or restaurant, 1 was in the information industry, and 3 or 13.6% were technical professionals or scientists.

In 2000, there were 5 workers who commuted into the municipality and 48 workers who commuted away. The municipality is a net exporter of workers, with about 9.6 workers leaving the municipality for every one entering. Of the working population, 2.1% used public transportation to get to work, and 63.9% used a private car.

== Religion ==
From the 2000 census, 10 or 5.1% were Roman Catholic, while 156 or 79.2% belonged to the Swiss Reformed Church. Of the rest of the population, there were 38 individuals (or about 19.29% of the population) who belonged to another Christian church. There were 7 (or about 3.55% of the population) who were Islamic. There was 1 person who was Hindu. 2 (or about 1.02% of the population) belonged to no church, are agnostic or atheist, and 2 individuals (or about 1.02% of the population) did not answer the question.

== Education ==
In Reisiswil about 81 or (41.1%) of the population have completed non-mandatory upper secondary education, and 10 or (5.1%) have completed additional higher education (either university or a Fachhochschule). Of the 10 who completed tertiary schooling, 90.0% were Swiss men.

The Canton of Bern school system provides one year of non-obligatory Kindergarten, followed by six years of Primary school. This is followed by three years of obligatory lower Secondary school where the students are separated according to ability and aptitude. Following the lower Secondary students may attend additional schooling or they may enter an apprenticeship.

During the 2009–10 school year, there were a total of 10 students attending classes in Reisiswil. There was one kindergarten class with a total of 10 students in the municipality. Of the kindergarten students, one was a permanent or temporary resident of Switzerland (not a citizen).

As of 2000, there was one student in Reisiswil who came from another municipality, while 4 residents attended schools outside the municipality.
