= Gondiswil =

- Municipality
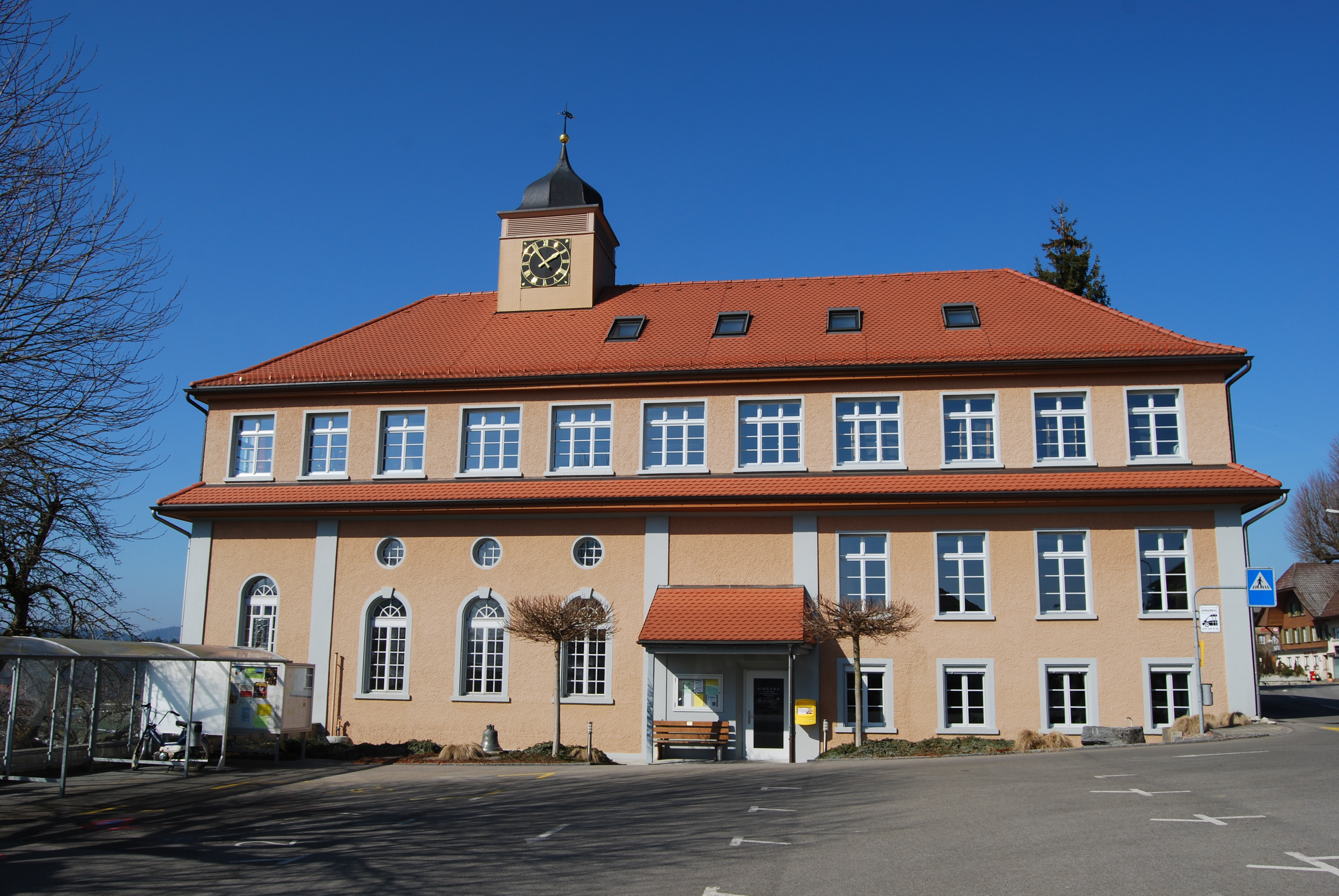
- Reformed church, post office and town hall of Gondiswil

- Flag Coat of arms
- Location of Gondiswil
- Location within Switzerland Location within Canton of Bern
- Coordinates: 47°9′N 7°52′E
- Country: Switzerland
- Canton: Bern
- District: Oberaargau

Area
  - Total: 9.4 km^{2} (3.6 sq mi)
- Elevation: 660 m (2,170 ft)

Population (December 2020)
  - Total: 711
  - Density: 76/km^{2} (200/sq mi)
- Time zone: UTC+01:00 (CET)
  - Summer (DST): UTC+02:00 (CEST)
- Postal code: 4955
- SFOS number: 326
- ISO 3166 code: CH-BE
- Surrounded by: Huttwil, Auswil, Madiswil, Reisiswil, Melchnau, Grossdietwil, Fischbach, Zell and Ufhusen.
- Website: www.gondiswil.ch

Gondiswil (local dialect Gumiswil) is a municipality in the Oberaargau administrative district in the canton of Bern in Switzerland.

== History ==
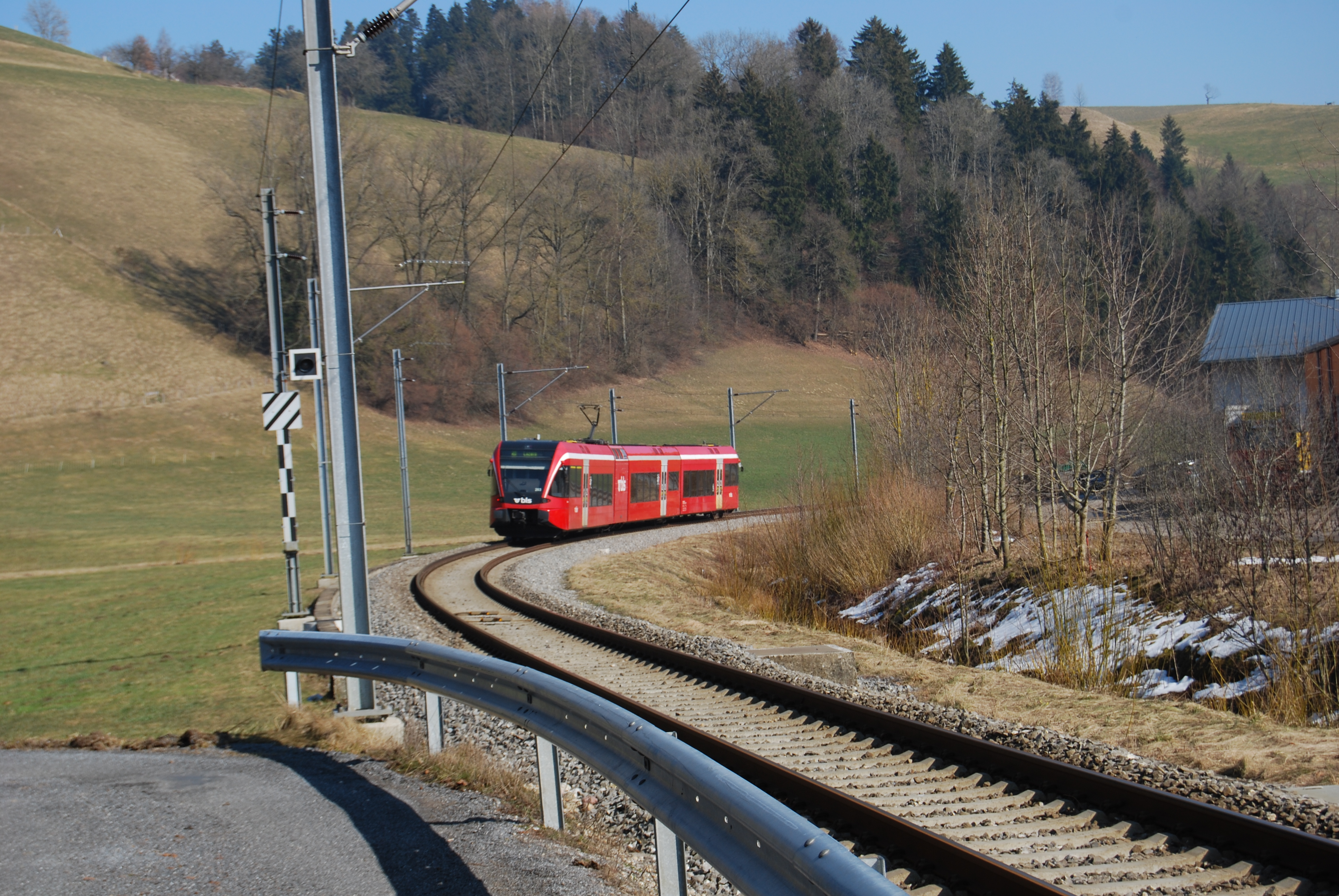
Train station in Gondiswil. The first railroad station in the village was built in 1889.

Aerial view of Gondiswil, Ärbolligen and Rohrbach from 3000 m by Walter Mittelholzer (1923)

Gondiswil is first mentioned in the mid-9th century as Cundolteswilare.

The only evidence of prehistoric people in Gondiswil are some scattered neolithic items that were found near Staldershaus. During the Middle Ages the major landowners were all local nobles. However, in 841-72 the Perchtgers donated land to the Abbey of St. Gallen. In 1194 the Baron of Langenstein granted some land in Gondiswil to St. Urban's Abbey. Other religious houses also eventually acquired land in or around the village including the Benedictine monastery of St. Johannsen in Erlach in 1236 and the Knights Hospitaller Thunstetten Commandery in 1263. During the Late Middle Ages it was part of the court of Murgeten in Murgenthal and belonged to the Herrschaft of Grünenberg. The entire Herrschaft was partially sold in 1432 and completely sold in 1480 to Bern. Under Bernese control Gondiswil and Melchnau formed a low court in the bailiwick of Aarwangen.

Religiously it was part of the parish of Grossdietwil in Lucerne until the Protestant Reformation. In 1528 it became part of the parish of Melchnau. In an effort to become their own parish, in 1737 the village built a cemetery. However, it took several centuries for this goal to be realized. Starting in 1856 or 1870 worship and Sunday school services were conducted in the village. In 1918 a church was completed. Then, in 1945 the Melchnau parish appointed a vicar to oversee Gondiswil. Finally in 1960, a rectory was built and the village became a parish. In 1300 in the hamlet of Freibach, the Lords of Büttikon built St. Mary's Chapel. During the 14th and 15th centuries, this chapel became a pilgrimage site and the headquarters of a regional blacksmiths fellowship. The chapel was demolished in 1528.

During the 18th and 19th centuries, linen mills and a wooden shoe factory provided jobs outside of agriculture. In 1889 the Langenthal-Huttwil-Wolhusenbahn built a railroad and station through Gondiswil. During the First and Second World Wars there was a coal mine in the village.

== Geography ==
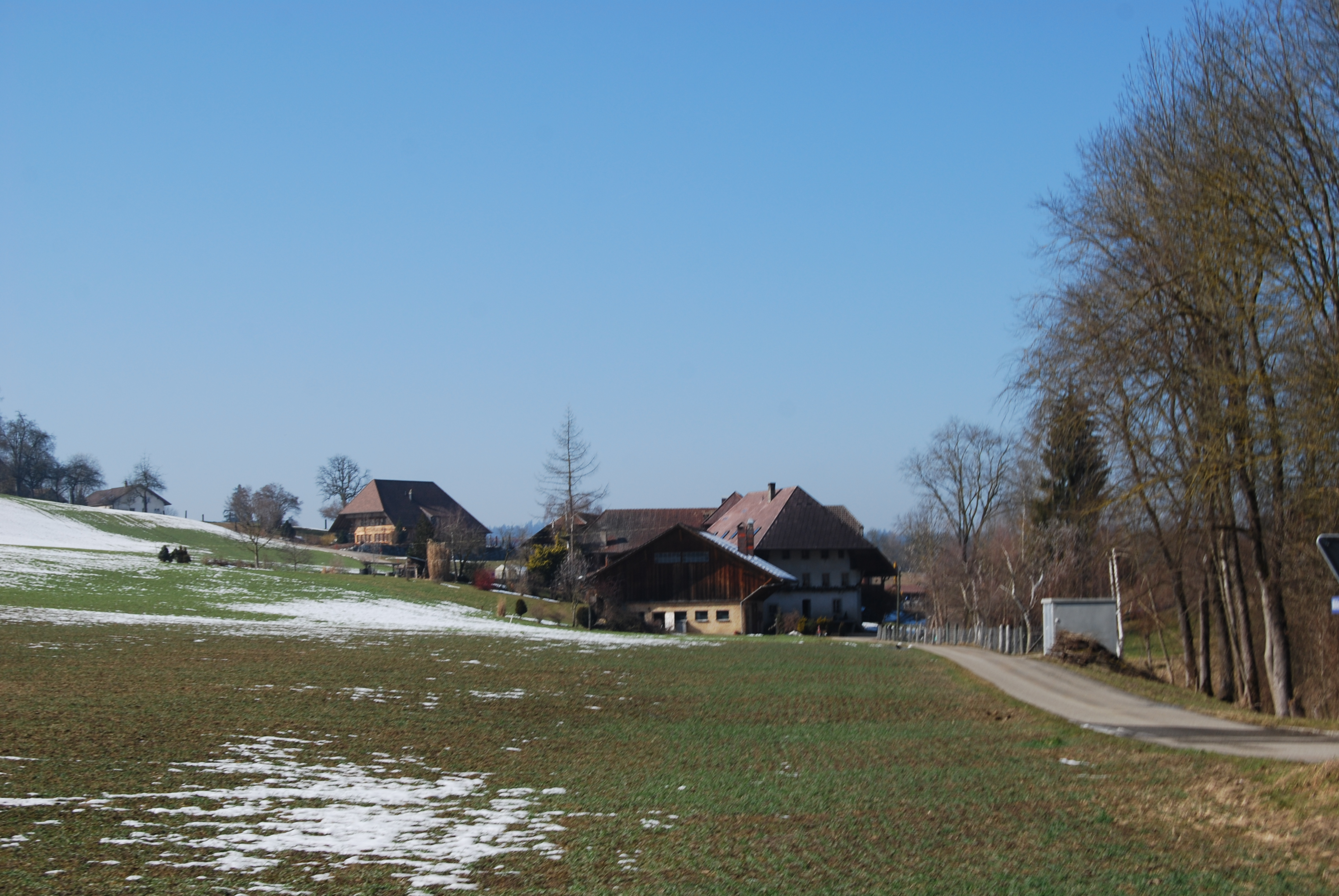
Farm house and fields outside Gondiswil

Gondiswil has an area of 9.4 km^{2} (3.63 sq mi). Of this area, 6.49 km^{2} (2.51 mi^{2}) or 69.3% is used for agricultural purposes, while 2.28 km^{2} (0.88 mi^{2}) or 24.3% is forested. Of the rest of the land, 0.55 km^{2} (0.21 mi^{2}) or 5.9% is settled (buildings or roads), 0.03 km^{2} (7.4 acres) or 0.3% is either rivers or lakes and 0.01 km^{2} (2.5 acres) or 0.1% is unproductive land.

Of the built up area, housing and buildings made up 2.3% and transportation infrastructure made up 3.0%. Out of the forested land, all of the forested land area is covered with heavy forests. Of the agricultural land, 40.4% is used for growing crops and 26.6% is pastures, while 2.2% is used for orchards or vine crops. All the water in the municipality is flowing water.

The municipality is located on the border with the Canton of Lucerne. It consists of the village of Gondiswil and the hamlets of Freibach, Brüggenweid, Haltstelle, Staldershaus and Schwendi.

On 31 December 2009 Amtsbezirk Aarwangen, the municipality's former district, was dissolved. On the following day, 1 January 2010, it joined the newly created Verwaltungskreis Oberaargau.

== Coat of arms ==
The blazon of the municipal coat of arms is Azure a Trefoil issuant from a Mount of 3 Coupeaux Vert and in Chief two Mullets of Five Argent.

== Demographics ==
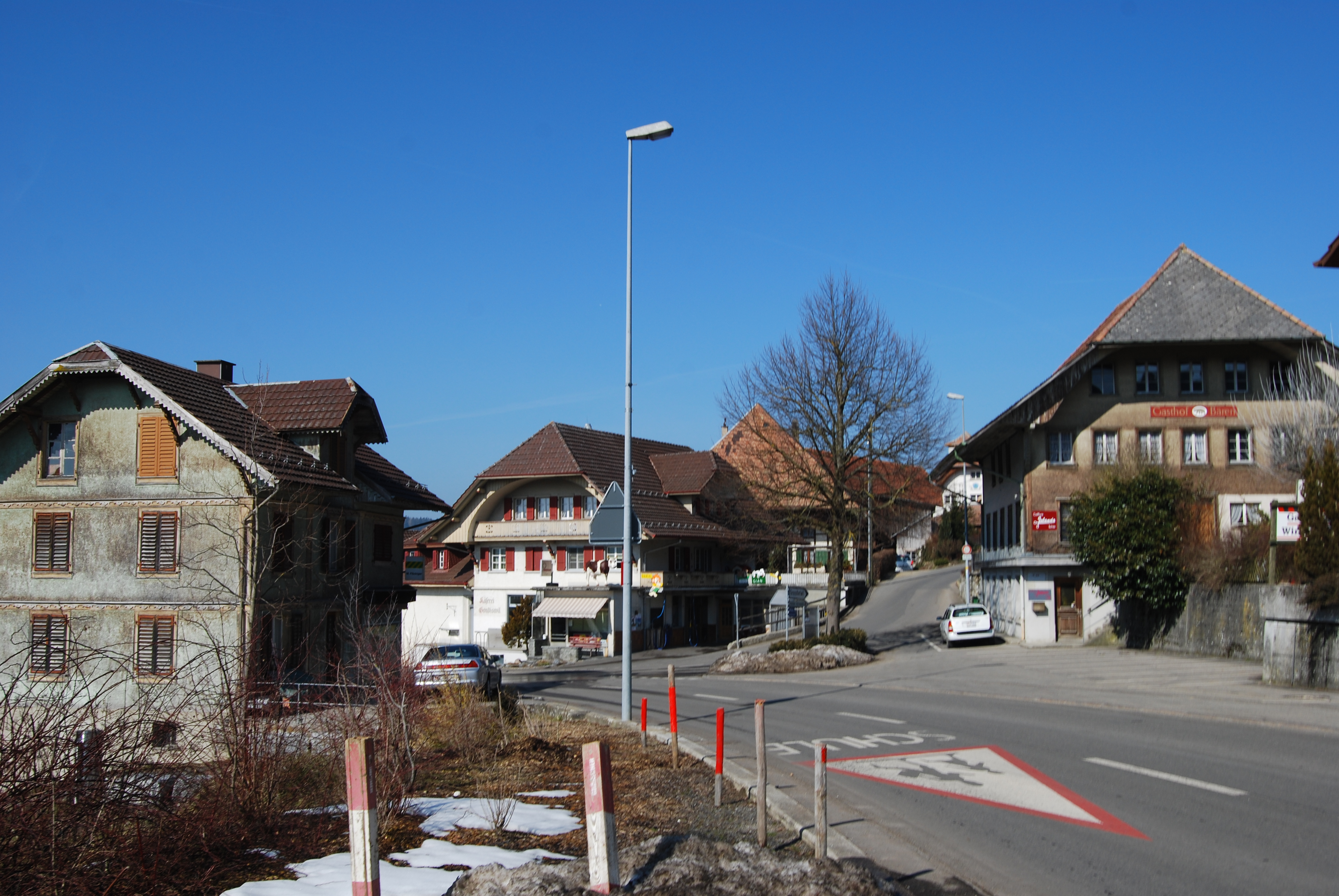
Gondiswil village center

Gondiswil has a population (as of December 2020) of 711. As of 2010, 2.0% of the population are resident foreign nationals. Over the last 10 years (2000-2010) the population has changed at a rate of -4.5%. Migration accounted for -2.8%, while births and deaths accounted for -2.3%.

Most of the population (as of 2000) speaks German (715 or 97.4%) as their first language, Albanian is the second most common (13 or 1.8%) and English is the third (3 or 0.4%). There is 1 person who speaks French and 1 person who speaks Romansh.

As of 2008, the population was 51.0% male and 49.0% female. The population was made up of 354 Swiss men (49.9% of the population) and 8 (1.1%) non-Swiss men. There were 342 Swiss women (48.2%) and 6 (0.8%) non-Swiss women. Of the population in the municipality, 374 or about 51.0% were born in Gondiswil and lived there in 2000. There were 235 or 32.0% who were born in the same canton, while 78 or 10.6% were born somewhere else in Switzerland, and 29 or 4.0% were born outside of Switzerland.

As of 2010, children and teenagers (0–19 years old) make up 20.8% of the population, while adults (20–64 years old) make up 58% and seniors (over 64 years old) make up 21.1%.

As of 2000, there were 298 people who were single and never married in the municipality. There were 370 married individuals, 43 widows or widowers and 23 individuals who are divorced.

As of 2000, there were 72 households that consist of only one person and 28 households with five or more people. In 2000, a total of 279 apartments (87.7% of the total) were permanently occupied, while 15 apartments (4.7%) were seasonally occupied and 24 apartments (7.5%) were empty. As of 2010, the construction rate of new housing units was 1.4 new units per 1000 residents. The vacancy rate for the municipality, in 2011, was 2.8%.

The historical population is given in the following chart:

== Transportation ==
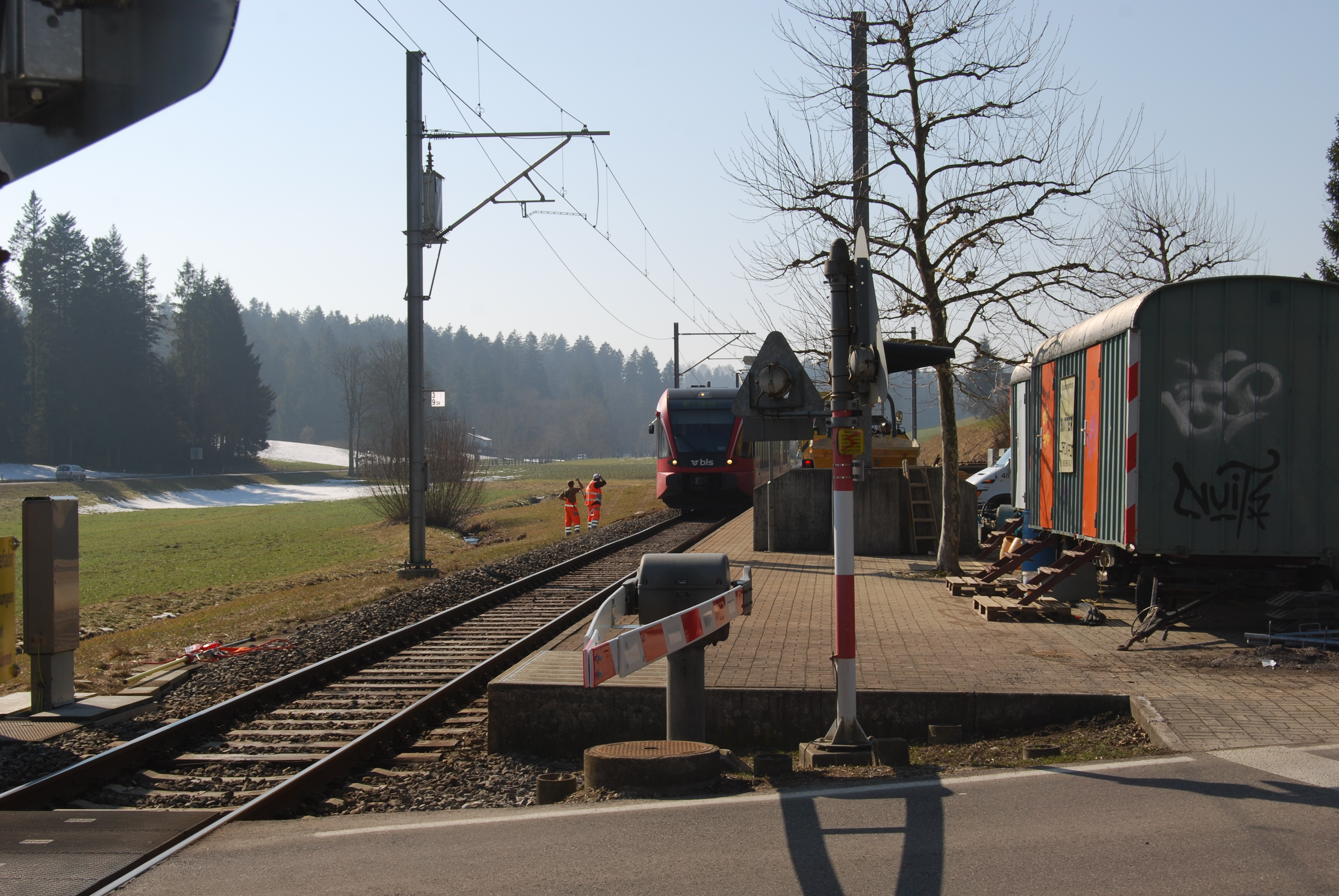
Gondiswil train station

Gondiswil lies on the Wolhusen–Huttwil railway and has a station.

== Politics ==
In the 2011 federal election the most popular party was the SVP which received 48.3% of the vote. The next three most popular parties were the BDP Party (17.9%), the SPS (8.3%) and the FDP (5.7%). In the federal election, a total of 300 votes were cast, and the voter turnout was 50.2%.

== Economy ==
In 1894 the Schieferkohle railway was founded. From 1918 to 1919, limited coal mining occurred, but the beds were too small, and the mine collapsed, leaving a small lake. In World War II, coal was again mined from the area.

As of 2011, Gondiswil had an unemployment rate of 0.44%. As of 2008, there were a total of 228 people employed in the municipality. Of these, there were 135 people employed in the primary economic sector and about 51 businesses involved in this sector. 58 people were employed in the secondary sector and there were 10 businesses in this sector. 35 people were employed in the tertiary sector, with 13 businesses in this sector.

In 2008 there were a total of 158 full-time equivalent jobs. The number of jobs in the primary sector was 79, all of which were in agriculture. The number of jobs in the secondary sector was 51 of which 39 or (76.5%) were in manufacturing and 12 (23.5%) were in construction. The number of jobs in the tertiary sector was 28. In the tertiary sector; 8 or 28.6% were in wholesale or retail sales or the repair of motor vehicles, 4 or 14.3% were in a hotel or restaurant and 8 or 28.6% were in education.

In 2000, there were 48 workers who commuted into the municipality and 238 workers who commuted away. The municipality is a net exporter of workers, with about 5.0 workers leaving the municipality for every one entering. Of the working population, 7% used public transportation to get to work, and 58.2% used a private car.

== Religion ==
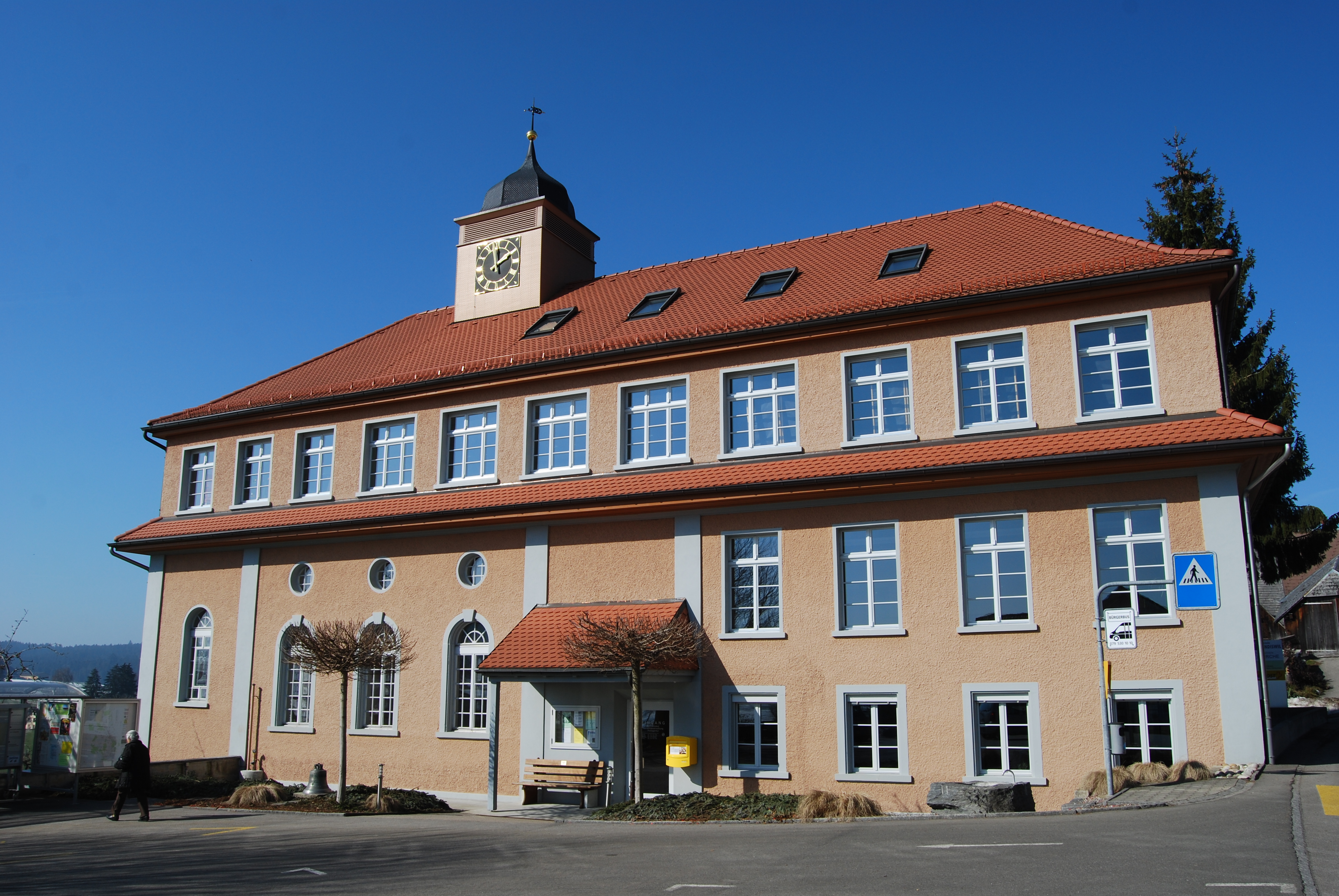
Reformed church, post office and town hall

From the 2000 census, 40 or 5.4% were Roman Catholic, while 645 or 87.9% belonged to the Swiss Reformed Church. Of the rest of the population, there were 2 members of an Orthodox church (or about 0.27% of the population), and there were 11 individuals (or about 1.50% of the population) who belonged to another Christian church. There were 6 (or about 0.82% of the population) who were Islamic. 18 (or about 2.45% of the population) belonged to no church, are agnostic or atheist, and 17 individuals (or about 2.32% of the population) did not answer the question.

== Education ==
In Gondiswil about 294 or (40.1%) of the population have completed non-mandatory upper secondary education, and 58 or (7.9%) have completed additional higher education (either university or a Fachhochschule). Of the 58 who completed tertiary schooling, 75.9% were Swiss men, 19.0% were Swiss women.

The Canton of Bern school system provides one year of non-obligatory Kindergarten, followed by six years of Primary school. This is followed by three years of obligatory lower Secondary school where the students are separated according to ability and aptitude. Following the lower Secondary students may attend additional schooling or they may enter an apprenticeship.

During the 2009–10 school year, there were a total of 67 students attending classes in Gondiswil. There were no kindergarten classes in the municipality. The municipality had 3 primary classes and 52 students. Of the primary students, 3.8% were permanent or temporary residents of Switzerland (not citizens) and 1.9% have a different mother language than the classroom language. During the same year, there was one lower secondary class with a total of 15 students. There were 6.7% who were permanent or temporary residents of Switzerland (not citizens) and 6.7% have a different mother language than the classroom language.

As of 2000, there were 9 students in Gondiswil who came from another municipality, while 25 residents attended schools outside the municipality.
