= Melchnau =

- Municipality
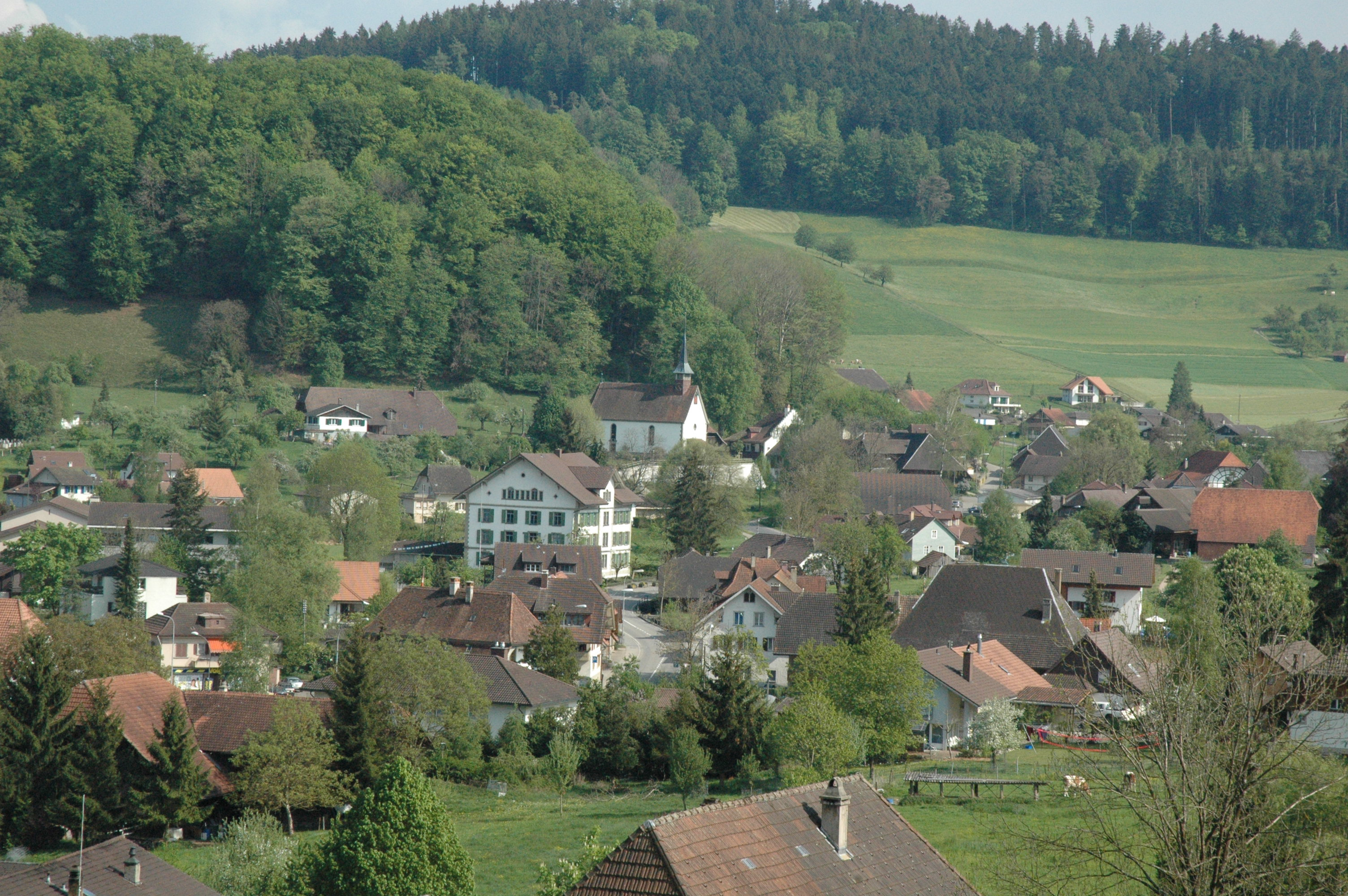

- Flag Coat of arms
- Location of Melchnau
- Location within Switzerland Location within Canton of Bern
- Coordinates: 47°11′N 7°51′E
- Country: Switzerland
- Canton: Bern
- District: Oberaargau

Area
  - Total: 10.4 km^{2} (4.0 sq mi)
- Elevation: 481 m (1,578 ft)

Population (December 2020)
  - Total: 1,488
  - Density: 143/km^{2} (371/sq mi)
- Time zone: UTC+01:00 (CET)
  - Summer (DST): UTC+02:00 (CEST)
- Postal code: 4917
- SFOS number: 333
- ISO 3166 code: CH-BE
- Surrounded by: Altbüron (LU), Busswil bei Melchnau, Gondiswil, Grossdietwil (LU), Madiswil, Pfaffnau (LU), Reisiswil, Untersteckholz
- Website: melchnau.ch

Melchnau is a municipality in the Oberaargau administrative district in the canton of Bern in Switzerland.

== History ==
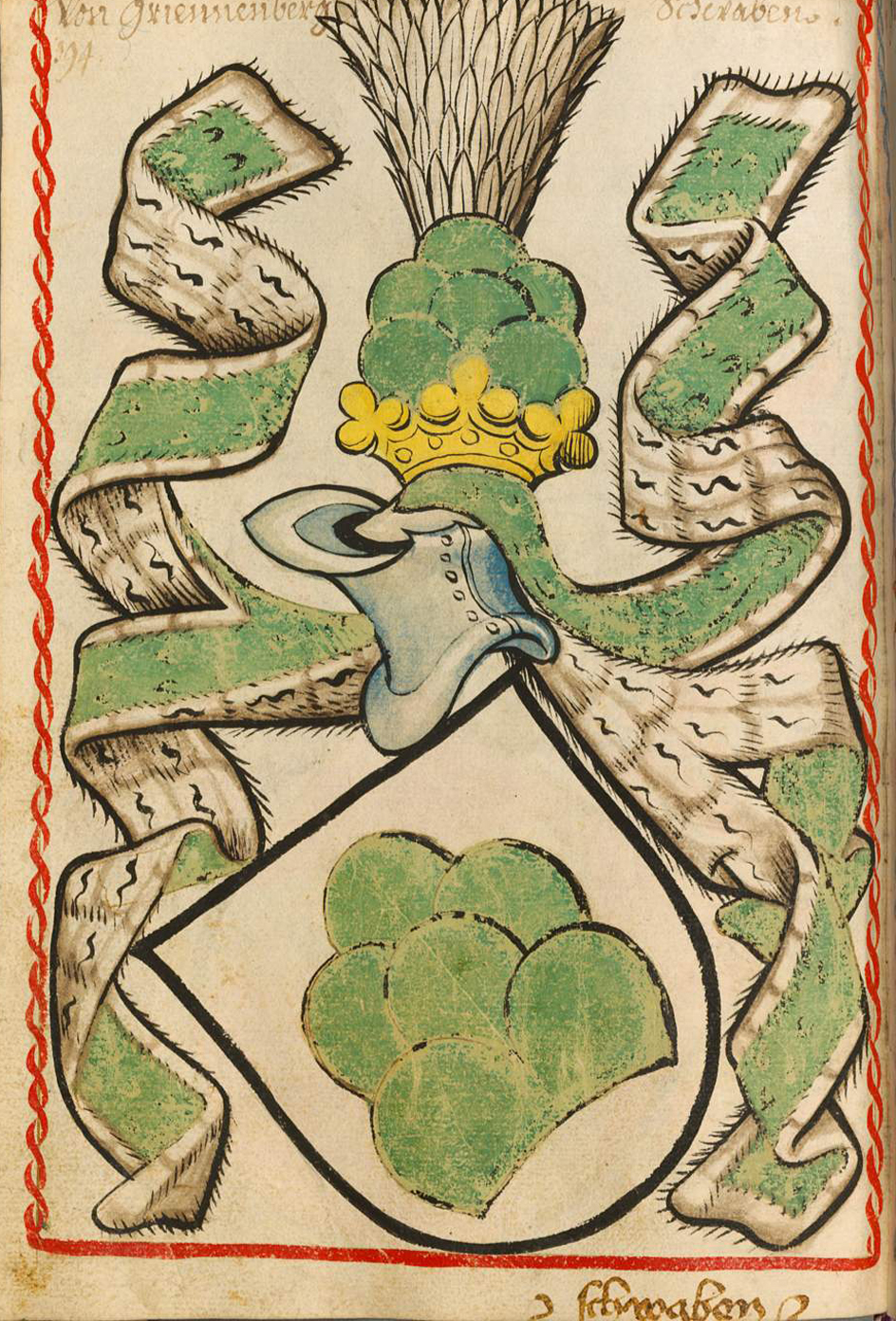
Coat of arms of the Grünenberg family from around 1450–1480

Aerial view from 3000 m par Walter Mittelholzer (1923)

Melchnau celebrated its 900th anniversary in 2000. The earliest written evidence for the town dates from about 1100. Melchnau is first mentioned in 1194 as Melchinove.

The Grünenberg-Schnabelburg-Langenstein complex of three ruined castles sit on a hill above the village. The Lords of Langenstein were first mentioned in 1194 when they helped found St. Urban's Abbey. The castle was likely built around that same time. Shortly thereafter, the Barons of Grünenberg inherited the Langenstein lands which they ruled from Grünenberg Castle. Between the 12th and 15th centuries, Grünenberg Castle was a cultural and political center for the nobility that ruled over much of the Oberaargau region. As the family split into separate branches, including the Schnabel von Grünenberg and Grimm von Grünenberg, a third castle was added to the complex.

In 1383–84, during the Burgdorferkrieg, the castles and village were attacked and captured by Bernese troops. After the war, the lands and castles were returned to the Grünenbergs after they entered into a treaty with Bern. However, the family's power continued to weaken and in 1444 they sold the lands that belonged to Grünenberg castle to Bern. A Bernese vogt or bailiff moved into the castle. In 1452 the last male Grünenberg heir, Wilhelm, died and in 1480 the family sold Langenstein castle to Bern. After the Grünenberg lands were absorbed by Bern, it became part of the Bailiwick of Aarwangen. The castles were abandoned and began to slowly fall into ruin. After the 1798 French invasion, it was transferred to the District of Langenthal in the Helvetic Republic. In 1803, after the collapse of the Republic, it went back to the Aarwangen District.

Until the Protestant Reformation, the village was part of the parish of Grossdietwil in the Canton of Lucerne.

In the 18th and 19th centuries, traditional agriculture was partially replaced by linen weaving, straw plaiting and shoe manufacturing (until 1960) in the local economy. In the last century, Melchnau has developed from a farming town to a municipality with a diversified economy. As well as small businesses, light industry (for example Lanten Textiles) has emerged. In 1917 a narrow-gauge railway was opened between Langenthal and Melchnau, which was superseded by buses in 1982. The railway and the station remain and are now used occasionally for special events.

== Geography ==
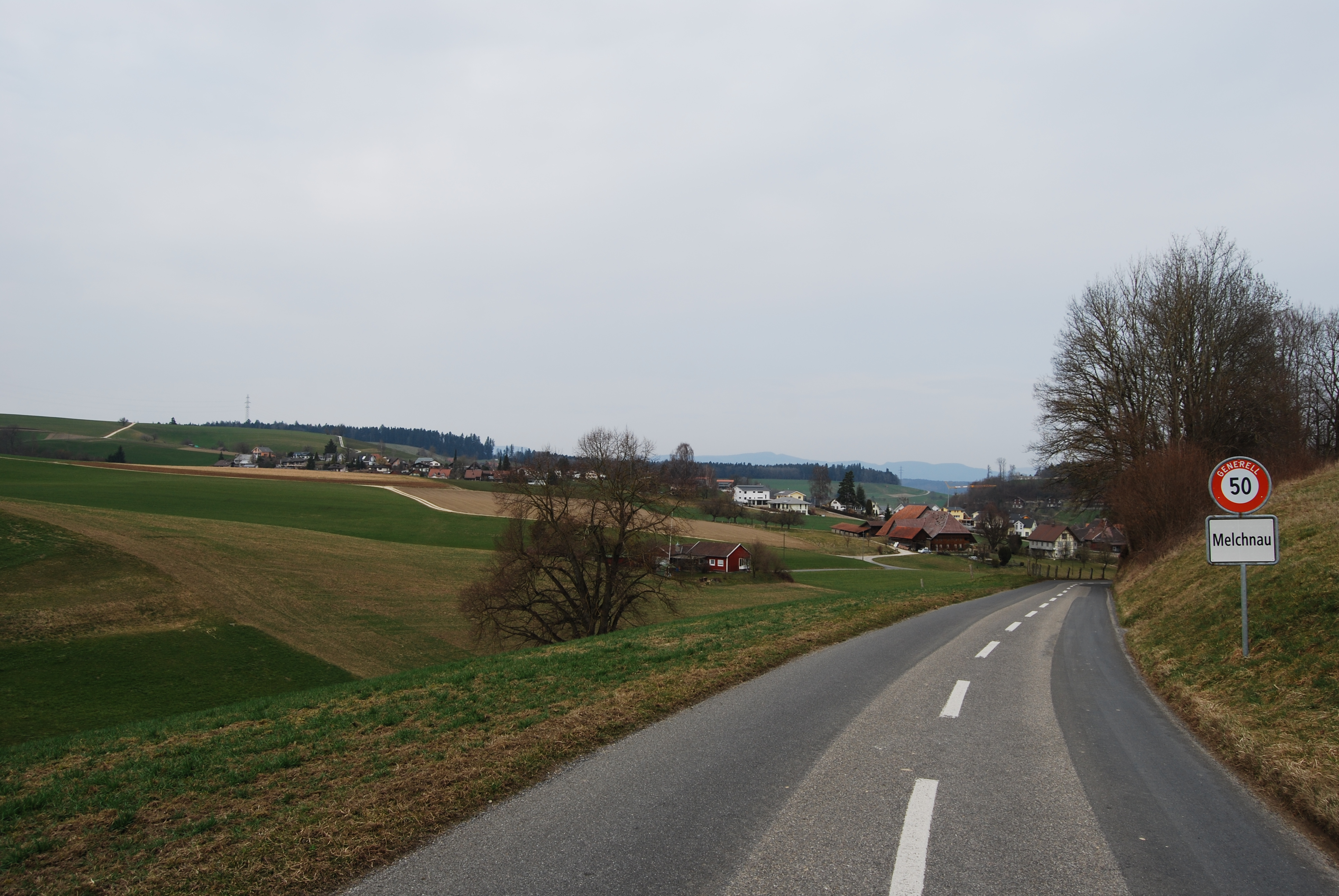
Melchnau village and surroundings

Melchnau has an area of 10.27 km^{2} (3.97 sq mi). Of this area, 5.92 km^{2} (2.29 mi^{2}) or 57.5% is used for agricultural purposes, while 3.63 km^{2} (1.40 mi^{2}) or 35.2% is forested. Of the rest of the land, 0.8 km^{2} (0.31 mi^{2}) or 7.8% is settled (buildings or roads), 0.01 km^{2} (2.5 acres) or 0.1% is either rivers or lakes and 0.01 km^{2} (2.5 acres) or 0.1% is unproductive land.

Of the built up area, housing and buildings made up 5.0% and transportation infrastructure made up 1.8%. Out of the forested land, 33.4% of the total land area is heavily forested and 1.8% is covered with orchards or small clusters of trees. Of the agricultural land, 27.5% is used for growing crops and 28.2% is pastures, while 1.8% is used for orchards or vine crops. All the water in the municipality is flowing water.

The municipality is located on the border with the Canton of Lucerne. It consists of the village of Melchnau and scattered farm houses.

On 31 December 2009 Amtsbezirk Aarwangen, the municipality's former district, was dissolved. On the following day, 1 January 2010, it joined the newly created Verwaltungskreis Oberaargau.

== Coat of arms ==
The blazon of the municipal coat of arms is Argent a Mount of Six Coupeaux floatant Vert.

== Demographics ==
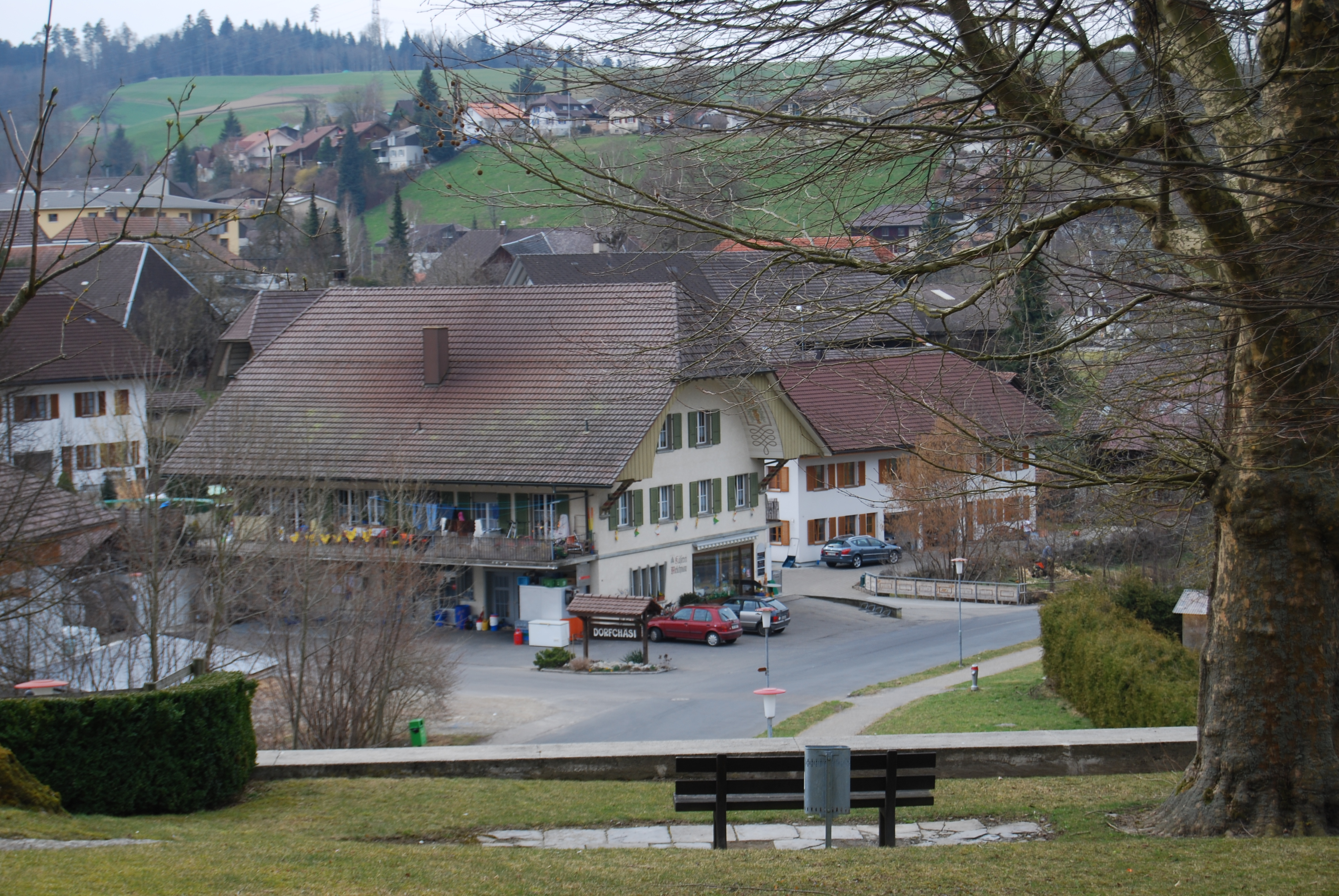
Melchnau village

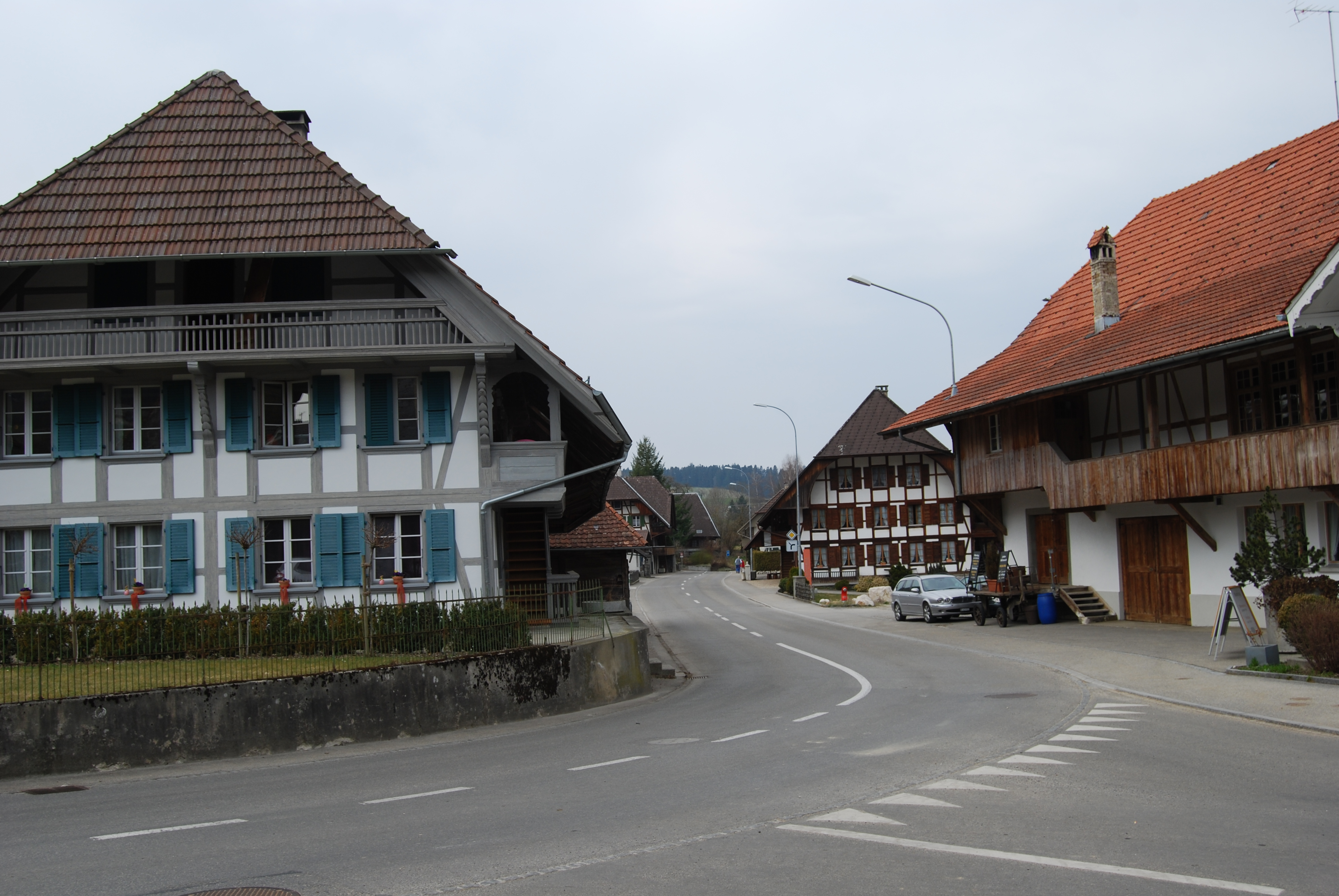
Half timbered houses in Melchnau

Melchnau has a population (as of December 2020) of 1,488. As of 2010, 11.1% of the population are resident foreign nationals. Over the last 10 years (2000–2010) the population has changed at a rate of -2.8%. Migration accounted for -0.9%, while births and deaths accounted for -2%.

Most of the population (as of 2000) speaks German (1,514 or 90.7%) as their first language, Serbo-Croatian is the second most common (59 or 3.5%) and Turkish is the third (30 or 1.8%). There are 5 people who speak French and 16 people who speak Italian.

As of 2008, the population was 50.1% male and 49.9% female. The population was made up of 679 Swiss men (44.1% of the population) and 93 (6.0%) non-Swiss men. There were 690 Swiss women (44.8%) and 78 (5.1%) non-Swiss women. Of the population in the municipality, 581 or about 34.8% were born in Melchnau and lived there in 2000. There were 510 or 30.6% who were born in the same canton, while 259 or 15.5% were born somewhere else in Switzerland, and 209 or 12.5% were born outside of Switzerland. As of 2010, children and teenagers (0–19 years old) make up 20.8% of the population, while adults (20–64 years old) make up 58.8% and seniors (over 64 years old) make up 20.4%.

As of 2000, there were 654 people who were single and never married in the municipality. There were 784 married individuals, 158 widows or widowers and 73 individuals who are divorced.

As of 2000, there were 161 households that consist of only one person and 61 households with five or more people. In 2000, a total of 576 apartments (87.5% of the total) were permanently occupied, while 45 apartments (6.8%) were seasonally occupied and 37 apartments (5.6%) were empty. As of 2010, the construction rate of new housing units was 2.6 new units per 1000 residents. The vacancy rate for the municipality, in 2011, was 4.51%.

The historical population is given in the following chart:

== Heritage sites of national significance ==
The Käserstock and the Stock des Birlihofs are listed as Swiss heritage site of national significance.

== Politics ==
In the 2011 federal election the most popular party was the SVP which received 40.3% of the vote. The next three most popular parties were the BDP Party (17.2%), the SPS (15.5%) and the EVP Party (8.3%). In the federal election, a total of 563 votes were cast, and the voter turnout was 49.8%.

== Economy ==
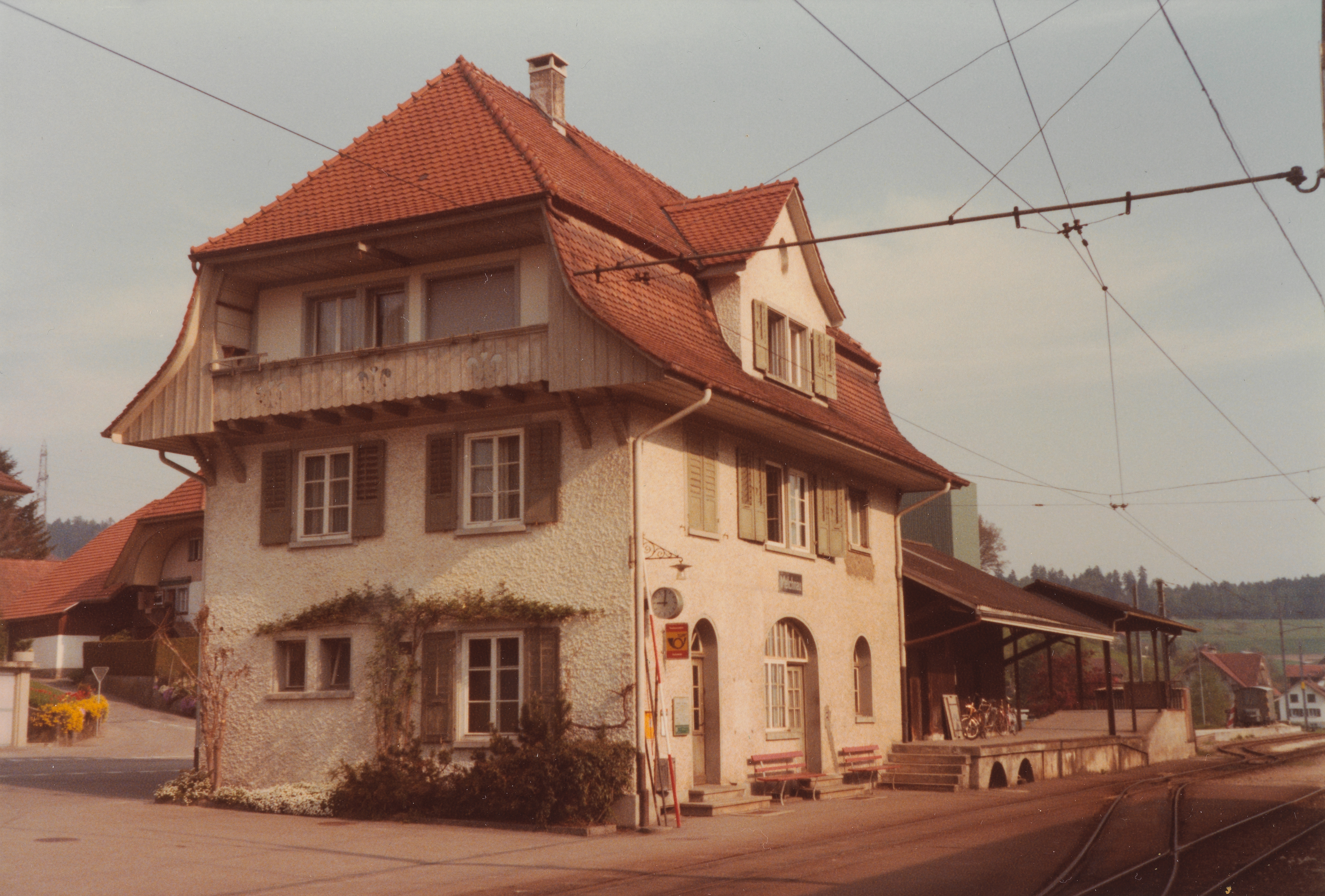
Melchnau railway station (1981, closed 2012)

As of 2011, Melchnau had an unemployment rate of 1.67%. As of 2008, there were a total of 744 people employed in the municipality. Of these, there were 111 people employed in the primary economic sector and about 38 businesses involved in this sector. 286 people were employed in the secondary sector and there were 17 businesses in this sector. 347 people were employed in the tertiary sector, with 43 businesses in this sector.

In 2008 there were a total of 581 full-time equivalent jobs. The number of jobs in the primary sector was 65, of which 63 were in agriculture and 2 were in forestry or lumber production. The number of jobs in the secondary sector was 266 of which 226 or (85.0%) were in manufacturing and 39 (14.7%) were in construction. The number of jobs in the tertiary sector was 250. In the tertiary sector; 70 or 28.0% were in wholesale or retail sales or the repair of motor vehicles, 11 or 4.4% were in the movement and storage of goods, 12 or 4.8% were in a hotel or restaurant, 3 or 1.2% were the insurance or financial industry, 8 or 3.2% were technical professionals or scientists, 20 or 8.0% were in education and 111 or 44.4% were in health care.

In 2000, there were 254 workers who commuted into the municipality and 460 workers who commuted away. The municipality is a net exporter of workers, with about 1.8 workers leaving the municipality for every one entering. Of the working population, 13.2% used public transportation to get to work, and 51.4% used a private car.

== Religion ==
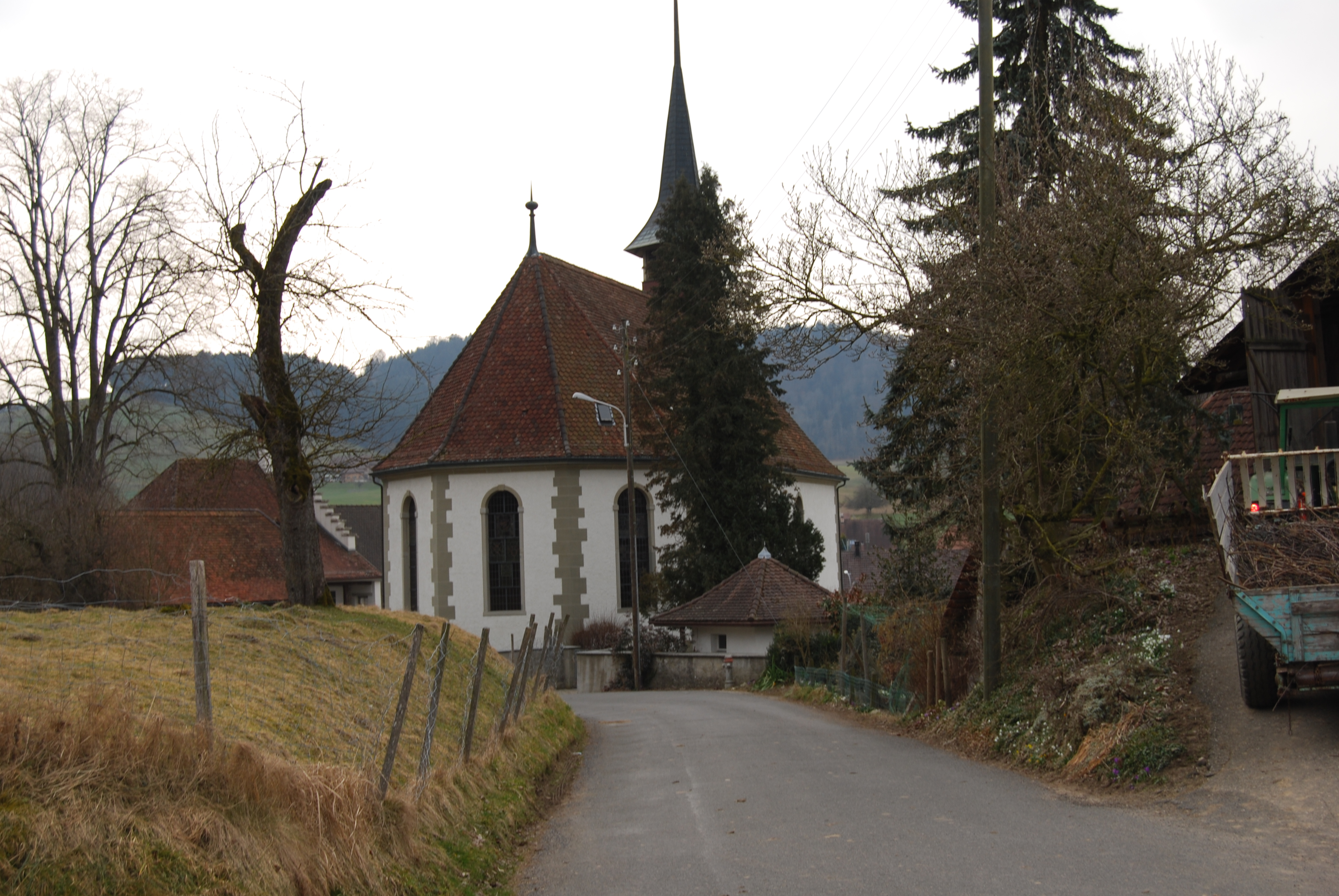
Reformed church of Melchnau

From the 2000 census, 219 or 13.1% were Roman Catholic, while 1,144 or 68.5% belonged to the Swiss Reformed Church. Of the rest of the population, there were 32 members of an Orthodox church (or about 1.92% of the population), and there were 52 individuals (or about 3.12% of the population) who belonged to another Christian church. There were 113 (or about 6.77% of the population) who were Islamic. There were 5 individuals who were Buddhist and 6 individuals who were Hindu. 86 (or about 5.15% of the population) belonged to no church, are agnostic or atheist, and 38 individuals (or about 2.28% of the population) did not answer the question.

== Education ==
In Melchnau about 600 or (35.9%) of the population have completed non-mandatory upper secondary education, and 127 or (7.6%) have completed additional higher education (either university or a Fachhochschule). Of the 127 who completed tertiary schooling, 66.9% were Swiss men, 19.7% were Swiss women, 7.1% were non-Swiss men and 6.3% were non-Swiss women.

The Canton of Bern school system provides one year of non-obligatory Kindergarten, followed by six years of Primary school. This is followed by three years of obligatory lower Secondary school where the students are separated according to ability and aptitude. Following the lower Secondary students may attend additional schooling or they may enter an apprenticeship.

During the 2009–10 school year, there were a total of 195 students attending classes in Melchnau. There were 2 kindergarten classes with a total of 31 students in the municipality. Of the kindergarten students, 9.7% were permanent or temporary residents of Switzerland (not citizens) and 12.9% have a different mother language than the classroom language. The municipality had 6 primary classes and 107 students. Of the primary students, 11.2% were permanent or temporary residents of Switzerland (not citizens) and 10.3% have a different mother language than the classroom language. During the same year, there were 3 lower secondary classes with a total of 57 students. There were 19.3% who were permanent or temporary residents of Switzerland (not citizens) and 31.6% have a different mother language than the classroom language.

As of 2000, there were 26 students in Melchnau who came from another municipality, while 80 residents attended schools outside the municipality.
