= Grünenberg Castle =

Swiss military complex

- Ruine Grünenberg
- Melchnau
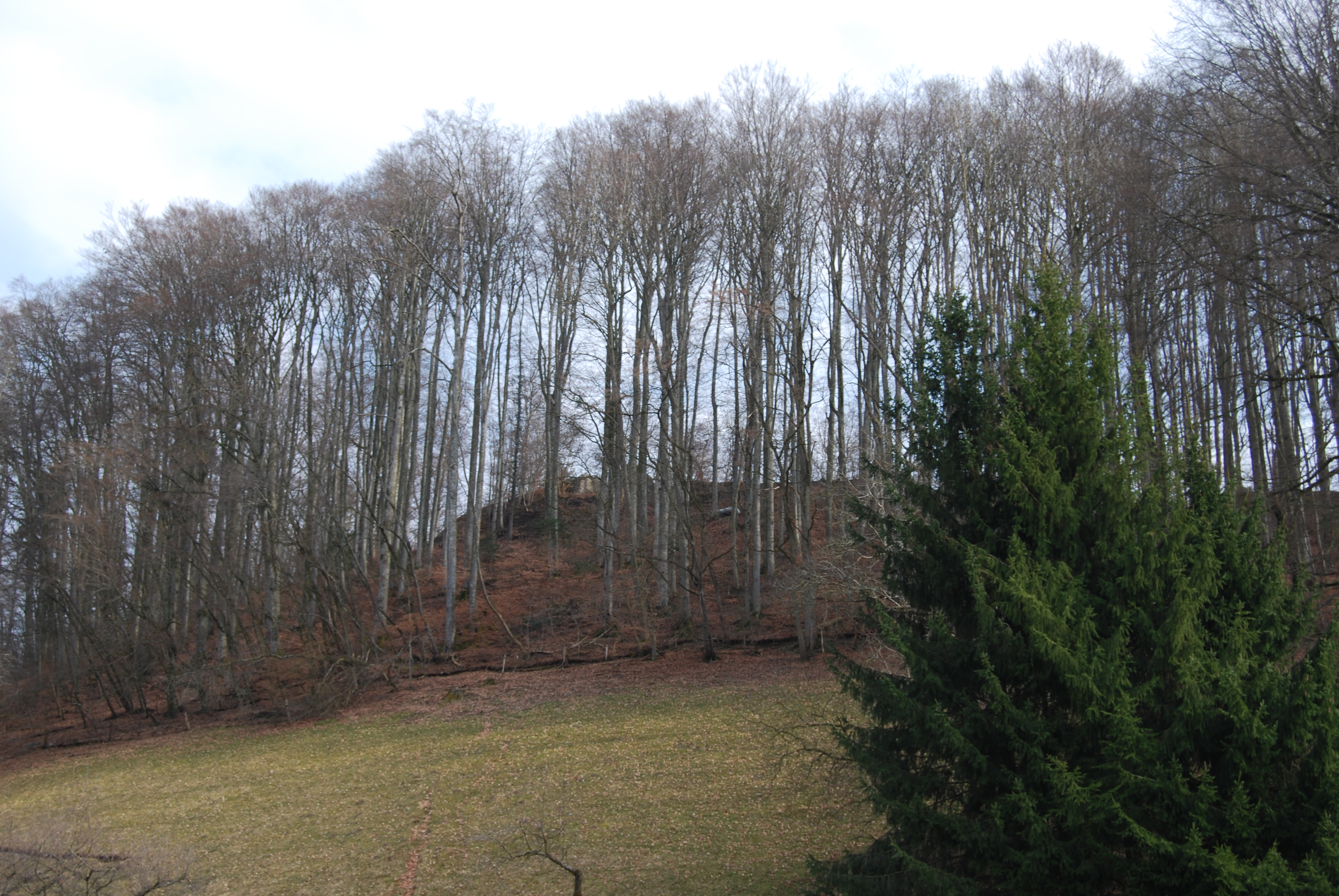
- View of the ruins of Grünenberg Castle

Site information
- Owner: Stiftung Burgruine Grünenberg Melchnau
- Open to the public: yes
- Condition: Ruined

Location
- Coordinates: 47.18°N 7.86°E

Site history
- Built: 11th–12th century
- In use: 11th–15th century
- Materials: Sandstone exterior with silicate rubble core
- Fate: Abandoned and fell into ruin
- Battles/wars: 1383–84 Burgdorferkrieg, 1444 Besieged by Bern

The ruins of Grünenberg Castle, Schnabelburg Castle and Langenstein Castle are a complex of three interconnected castles on a hill above the municipality of Melchnau in the canton of Bern in Switzerland. The three castles formed the center of power of the Barons of Grünenberg in the Oberaargau region during the High Middle Ages.

== History ==
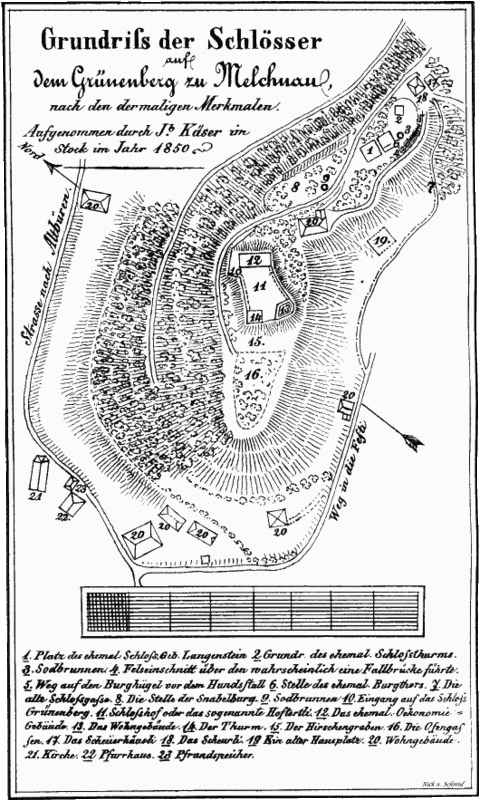
Plan of the castle complex from archeological digs in the 1850s. 1–7 are Langenstein Castle, 8–9 Schnabelburg Castle, and 10–23 Grünenberg Castle.

The complex of three ruined castles sits on a hill above the village of Melchnau. The Lords of Langenstein were first mentioned in 1194 when they helped found St. Urban's Abbey. The castle was likely built around that same time. Shortly thereafter, the Barons of Grünenberg inherited the Langenstein lands which they ruled from Grünenberg Castle. Between the 12th and 15th centuries, Grünenberg Castle was a cultural and political center for the nobility that ruled over much of the Oberaargau region. As the family split into separate branches, including the Schnabel von Grünenberg, Grimm von Grünenberg and Grünenberg vom Albis, a third castle was added to the complex.

In the 14th and 15th centuries, the families expanded their power through marriage, purchase or holding fiefs for the Habsburg or Kyburg families. Their influence spread out from the Oberaargau into the Bernese Oberland.

In 1383–84, during the Burgdorferkrieg, the castles and village were attacked and captured by Bernese troops. Both Schnabelburg and Grünenberg were destroyed during the war, but only Grünenberg was rebuilt. After the war, the lands and castles were returned to the Grünenbergs after they entered into a treaty with Bern. In 1432, the family sold Aarwangen to Bern and the last resident of Grünenberg Castle, the knight Wilhelm of Grünenberg, moved to Rheinfelden. In 1444 Grünenberg Castle was besieged and occupied by Bern. The Grünenberg lands were annexed and a Bernese vogt or bailiff moved into the castle. The last male Grünenberg heir, Wilhelm, died in 1452, and the family sold Langenstein castle to Bern in 1480. After the Grünenberg lands were absorbed by Bern, it became part of the Bailiwick of Aarwangen. The castles were abandoned and began to slowly fall into ruin.

In 1850, the municipal president Jakob Käser began to study the ruins, which he documented in a book, the Käser-Chronik in 1855. In 1949 the old castle chapel was excavated and a roof was built over the chapel ruins to prevent further decay. Between 1992 and 1998 the rest of the ruins were excavated and preserved.

== Location ==
The ruins are located on a hilltop just outside the village of Melchnau. From the parking lot in Melchnau Oberdorf, it takes about 10 minutes to follow a well marked trail to the ruins.

== Grünenberg castle site ==
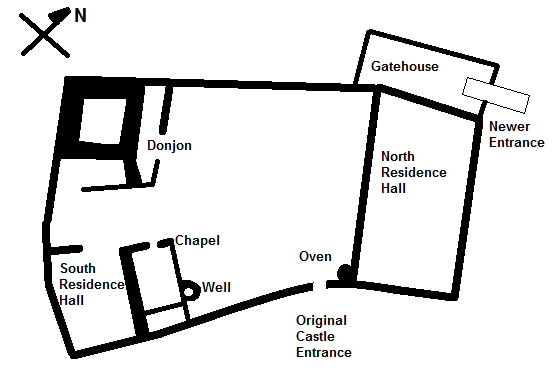
Plan of Grünenberg Castle

The first castle was probably a wooden fort from the 10th or 11th century. It was replaced in the 12th century by a stone curtain wall and a tower that would later be replaced by the donjon in the northwest corner. The wall had a silicate core with a shell of roughly trimmed sandstone blocks. The rock was quarried in trenches near the castle grounds. Shortly thereafter, the south and north residences were added inside the curtain wall. The original castle entrance was to the southeast. The southeast wall was protected by two trenches, which were spanned by a bridge at the original castle gate. The castle chapel and well house were added later, probably in the 13th century, onto the south residence.

The castle expanded during the 14th century as the fortunes of the family grew. The northern residence block was extended and dominated the entire northern side of the castle. The castle gate was relocated to the northern corner. The steep cliff face to the northeast limited the size of the gatehouse. The large circular oven was added to the western side of the courtyard at about the same time.

== See also ==
- List of castles in Switzerland
