= Grünenberg family =

Swiss noble family

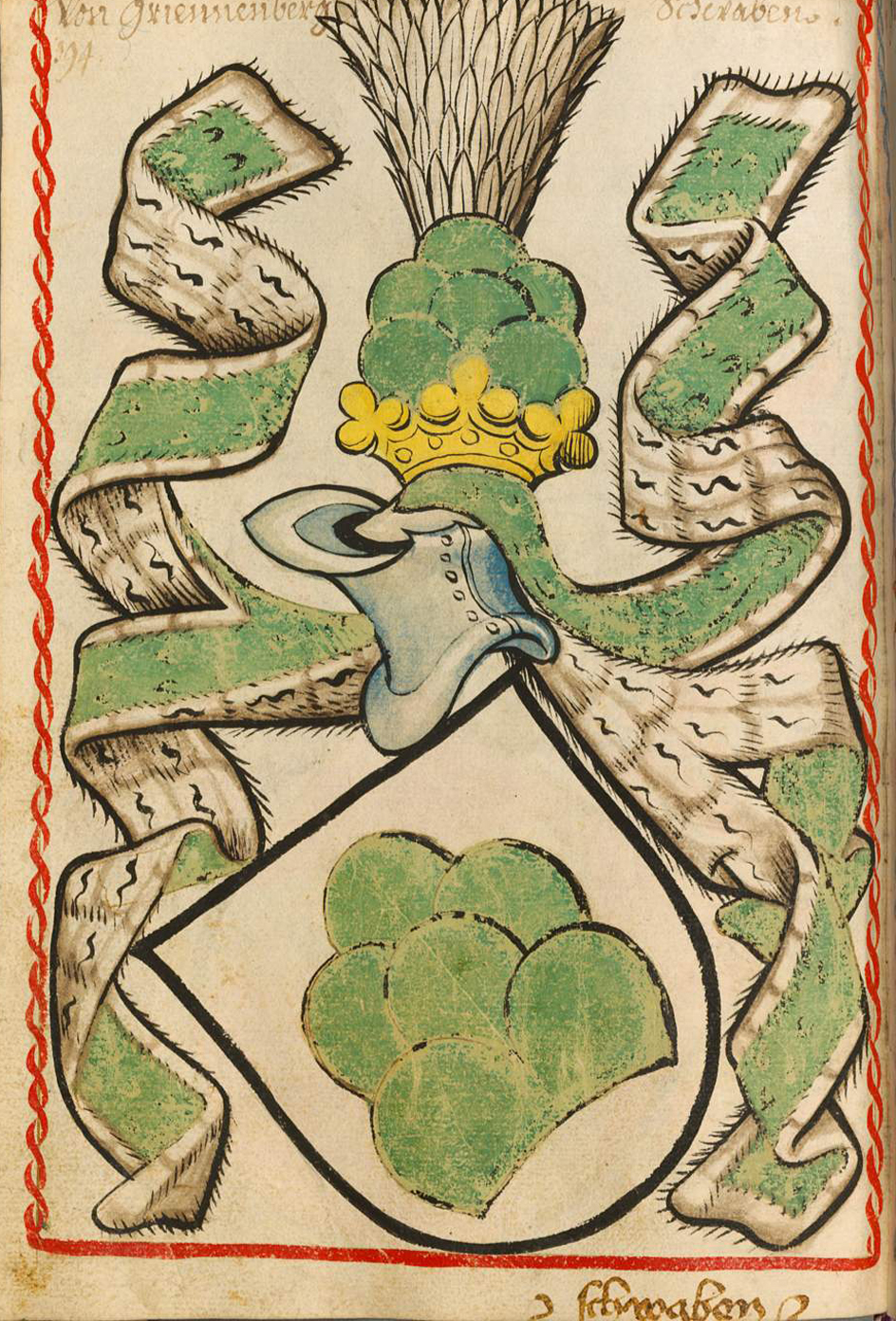
Coat of arms of the Grünenberg from the Scheiblerschen Wappenbuch

The Grünenberg family was a medieval Swiss noble family. The family was active from the middle of the 12th century until the 15th century in the Swiss Plateau, mostly in the Bernese Oberaargau. There were two major branches, the Grimme and Schnabel lines which then further divided into other branches. Some of these branches owned land in Alsace and in southern Bavaria, especially in the Markgräflerland and in Breisgau. About one hundred members of the family are known today. The family name comes from Grünenberg Castle in Melchnau in the Canton of Bern.

== History ==
The family was probably descended from the Langensteins. The earliest known members of the family were Walther I and Heinrich I, both of whom died before 1224. The two branches of the family were created in 1224. The founder of the younger Schnabel line, Markwart I, received the southern part of the family lands. Both branches of the family were allied with the Counts of Kyburg probably until the extinction of the Kyburg male line in 1264. The family gained some lands from the Kyburg inheritance as well as fiefs from the Habsburgs who inherited the majority of the Kyburg land. Both branches of the family remained supporters of the Habsburgs during the 13th and 14th centuries while the neighboring Old Swiss Confederation fought with the Austrian Habsburgs over land in the Swiss Plateau.

The Grimme line was further divided between the descendants of Johann the Grimme I and Arnold I though eventually the descendants of Johann became the main line. Through marriage they were related to a number of other noble families in the area including the Counts of Aarburg, Balm, Wolhusen and Aarwangen. The two branches of the Grimme line acquired towns, villages and churches throughout the region during the 14th century. However, by the late 14th century the Austrians had lost their power in Oberaargau and Bern was expanding rapidly. In 1407 Wilhelm Grünenberg accepted citizenship in the city of Bern and sold some of the estates to the city. In 1414 the Schnabel line died out with Hermann. In 1432 Wilhelm sold Aarwangen to Bern, gave up his citizenship in Bern and received Rheinfelden as a Habsburg imperial fief. He was an advisor to the Emperor Frederick III. He joined the Old Zürich War on the side of the Habsburgs. When he died by 1454, male line of the Grünenberg family ended.

== Coat of arms ==
The coat of arms is an example of canting arms, since the name Grünenberg means Green mountain, it always included green mountains. Normally there were six rounded mountains arraigned in a triangle with one then two then three mountains. As a crest it often had feathers and sometimes a small hut appeared on the mountains. The helmet cover is green on the outside and natural ermine on the interior.

In the Scheiblerschen Wappenbuch it is shown with golden margins around six green mountains. The crest has a golden baron's coronet.

== Literature ==
- Jufer, Max (1994). "Die Freiherren von Langenstein-Grünenberg, Band 37" [The Barons of Langenstein-Grünenberg, Volume 37]. In Flatt, Karl H. (ed.). Jahrbuch des Oberaargaus [Yearbook of the Oberaargau] (in German). Langenthal: Merkur Druck AG. pp. 109–214.
- Käser, Jakob (1855). "XIII. Die alten Twingherrenburgen und Nachrichten von den alten Twingherren" [XIII. The old Twingherrenburgen and news from the old Twingerman]. Topographische, historische und statistische Darstellung des Dorfes und Gemeindebezirkes Melchnau in seinen Beziehungen zur Vergangenheit, Gegenwart und Zukunft : Mit zwei lithographischen Erläuterungstafeln [Topographical, historical and statistical presentation of the village and district of Melchnau in its relations to the past, present and future: with two lithographic explanatory panels] (in German). Langenthal: Gedruckt bei J. Konrad. pp. 183–194. ("Grundriss der Schlösser", p. 185)
- Mülinen, Wolfgang Friedrich von (1890). "Grünenberg". Der Oberaargau, Beiträge zur Heimatkunde des Kantons Bern, Deutschen Theils, Heft 5 [The Oberaargau, contributions to the civics of the canton of Bern, the German part, Issue 5] (in German). Bern: Nydegger & Baumgart. pp. 78–85.
- Plüss, August (1900). Die Freiherren von Grünenberg in Kleinburgund. Inaugural-Dissertation zur Erlangung der Doktorwürde eingereicht der hohen philosophischen Fakultät der Universität Bern, Archiv des Historischen Vereins des Kantons Bern, Band XVI, Heft 1 [The barons of Grünenberg in Kleinburgund. Inaugural dissertation to obtain the doctorate submitted the high philosophical faculty of the University of Bern, archive of the Historical Association of the Canton of Bern, Volume XVI, Issue 1] (in German). Bern: Stämpfli.
- Plüss, August (1904). "Freie von Grünenberg und Langenstein" [Free of Grünenberg and Langenstein]. Genealogisches Handbuch zur Schweizer Geschichte [Genealogical Handbook on Swiss History] (in German). Zürich: Schulthess & Co. pp. 278–289. Edited from Schweizerische Heraldische Gesellschaft, Band I: Hoher Adel [Swiss Heraldic Society, Volume I: High nobility].
- Wenger, Lukas (2007). "Ganerbensitz Grünenberg? – Eigentumsverhältnisse der Freiherren von Grünenberg untersucht mit Hilfe einer genealogischen Datenbank" [Ganerbensitz Grünenberg? - Ownership of the barons of Grünenberg examined with the help of a genealogical database]. Burgen und Schlösser, Zeitschrift der Deutschen Burgenvereinigung [Castles and Locks, Journal of the German Castle Association] (in German) (3). Braubach am Rhein: 152–155. ISSN 0007-6201.
