= Langenstein family =

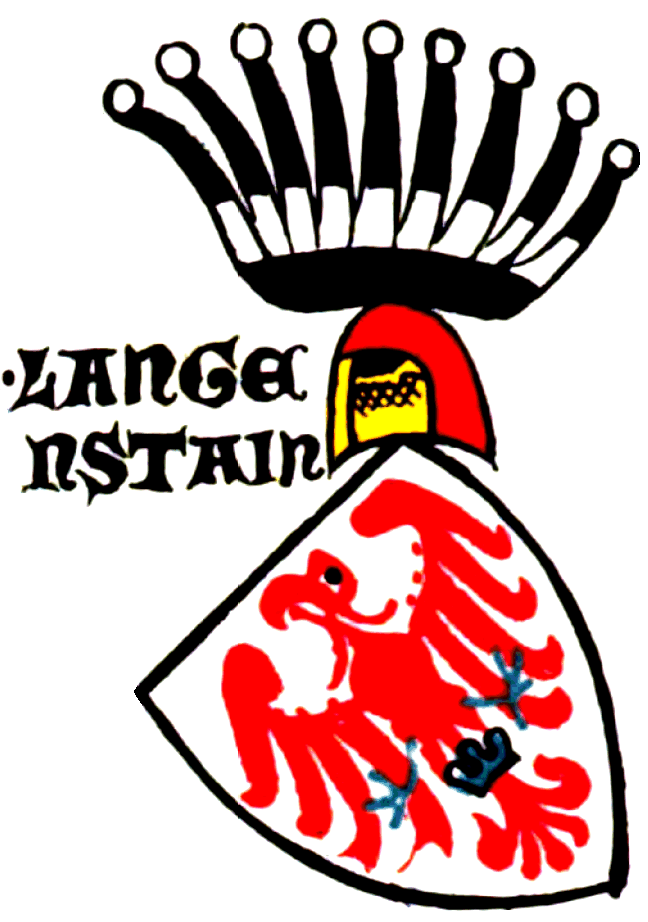
Coat of arms of the Langenstein family

The Langenstein family is an extinct Swiss noble family that came from Langenstein Castle in Melchnau in the Canton of Bern in Switzerland. Only two generations of the family are known. In 1194 the family helped found the Cistercian St. Urban's Abbey. The family became extinct in the early 13th century, though much of their land was inherited by the Grünenbergs.

== History ==
The House of Langenstein had their family seat on the Grünenberg Castle hill above the village of Melchnau. Archeological digs on the site have found evidence of a 10th or 11th century wooden castle, below later stone castles. This wooden castle was the first High Medieval fortification on the hill. The name of the family likely came from the long stony crest of the hill and may have originally been langer Stein or long stone in English.

The family owned land in the Rot (a tributary of the Murg river) and Langete river valleys. The family may have settled in the valley to begin colonizing the empty forest between the County of Burgundy in the west and the Alamannia territories in the east.

The first time the Langenstein family appears, is in an unconfirmed record from 1148, when they supposedly founded an Augustinian Canons Regular.

=== First generation ===
The first recorded generation of the Langenstein family consisted of five siblings; Ulrich the knight, the two clergymen Lütold and Werner I. and two sisters Willebirk (Willbirgis) and Adelheid. Ulrich was mentioned in 1191 as the owner of a church in Rot, now in the hamlet of Chlyrot in Untersteckholz. His brothers were both clergymen at that church, Werner I was the head of the canons and Lütold was the priest. Ulrich's wife was Mechtild, the widow of Baron Werner II of Signau, who died in 1178.

Willebirk (mentioned 1197) was married to the Baron and Knight Arnold of Kapfenberg (who was mentioned in 1200). Her sister, Adelheid (mentioned 1197-1239) had Baron Burkhard of Balm (mentioned by 1201) for a husband.

Between 1191-1194 the three Langenstein brothers founded a Cistercian monastery. Diethelm of Krenkingen, Bishop of Constance, confirmed the donation and that it was accepted by the General Chapter of the Order at Citeaux in 1194. The mother monastery, Lützel Abbey, sent twelve monks under the Abbot Konrad to establish an Abbey on the Langenstein lands. However, the first location in the Rot valley proved inadequate and in 1195, the monks moved about 3 km (1.9 mi) down the valley to establish St. Urban's Abbey.

=== Second generation ===
Baron Ulrich died in 1212. He left several children, including a daughter, Anna (1197–1224) and two sons, Werner II (mentioned before 1212-1214) and Heinrich (first mentioned before 1212 and died after 1234). The existence of another son named Cuno is uncertain.

Ulrich's daughter Anna is probably the wife of the knight Ulrich I (mentioned from before 1218 to before 1224) from the highly respected family of Grünenberg. The majority of the Langenstein descendants had already founded their own families, such as the Balm family, a generation before. Therefore, Anna became the primary heiress to the Langenstein lands. With her marriage to Ulrich of Grünenberg, she brought the Langenstein lands into the Grünenberg family. Anna died seven days after the death of her husband, but not before her and her sons made a large donation to the Abbey of St. Urban.

During the second half of the 13th century, another member of the Langenstein family, Iddah of Langenstein and her husband Heinz of Luternau were involved in a bloody struggle for supremacy in the market town of Langenthal. The bloody conflict, which devastated the Abbey of St. Urban, had the descendants of Iddah and Heinz fighting against the main branch of Langenstein descendants, Heinrich II and Markwart I of Grünenberg.

== Coat of arms ==
There are several different versions of the insignia of the Barons of Langenstein. One appears only in the 14th century and features a pacing red lion on a transversely divided blue-white field.

In the Zurich Wappenrolle it is completely different; Argent, an eagle gules charged on its tail with a crown azure.

== Reichenau ministeriales ==
The Barons of Langenstein are not to be confused with the Ministerialis (unfree knights in the service of a feudal overlord) family of Langenstein, who were in the service of Reichenau Abbey. This family consisted of Arnold I of Langenstein (mentioned 1271 and 1272) and his sons Hugo the Younger (mentioned before 1271 and after 1298), Berthold, Arnold and Frederick II. In 1271, they granted the island of Mainau, which they were holding as a fief for the Abbey, to the Teutonic Order. In 1272, the Order established a Commandry and allowed Hugo and another of his brothers to live there. Hugo was a Middle High German poet and he wrote an extensive poem about the life and martyrdom of Martina of Rome. This family took their name from Langenstein Castle in Hegau in southern Germany.
