= Saint Urban's Abbey =

Former Cisterian monastery

Coordinates: 47°13′55″N 7°50′24″E

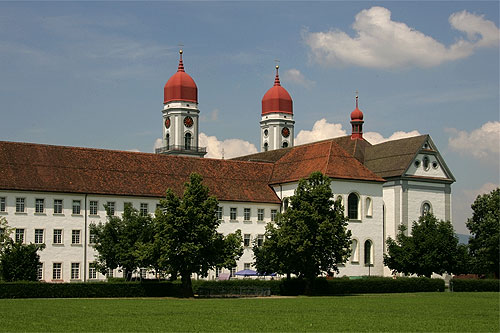
St. Urban's Abbey

St. Urban's Abbey (German: Kloster Sankt Urban) is a former Cistercian monastery in the municipality of Pfaffnau in the canton of Lucerne in Switzerland. It is a Swiss heritage site of national significance.

== History ==
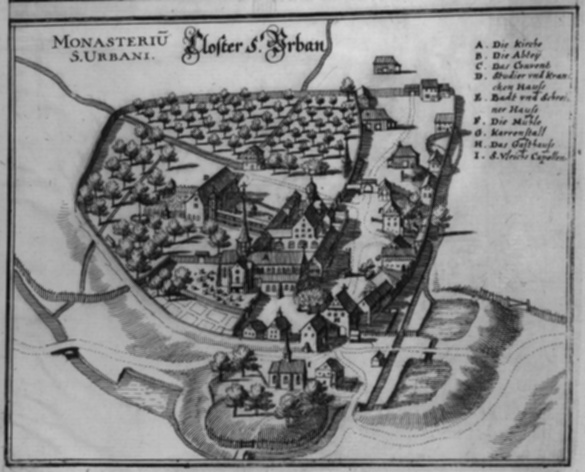
Plan of St. Urban's Abbey in 1654

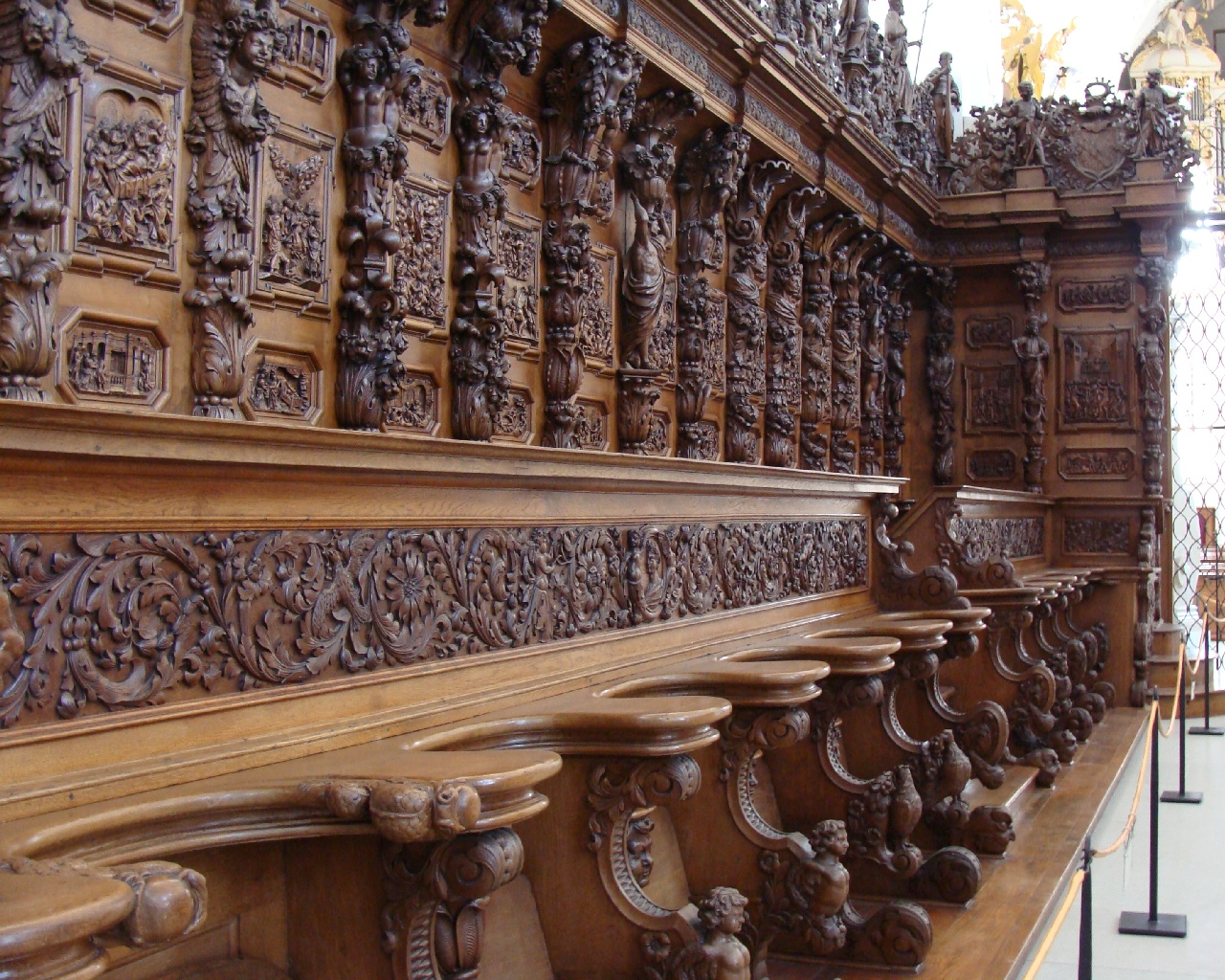
Ornate choir pews in the Abbey

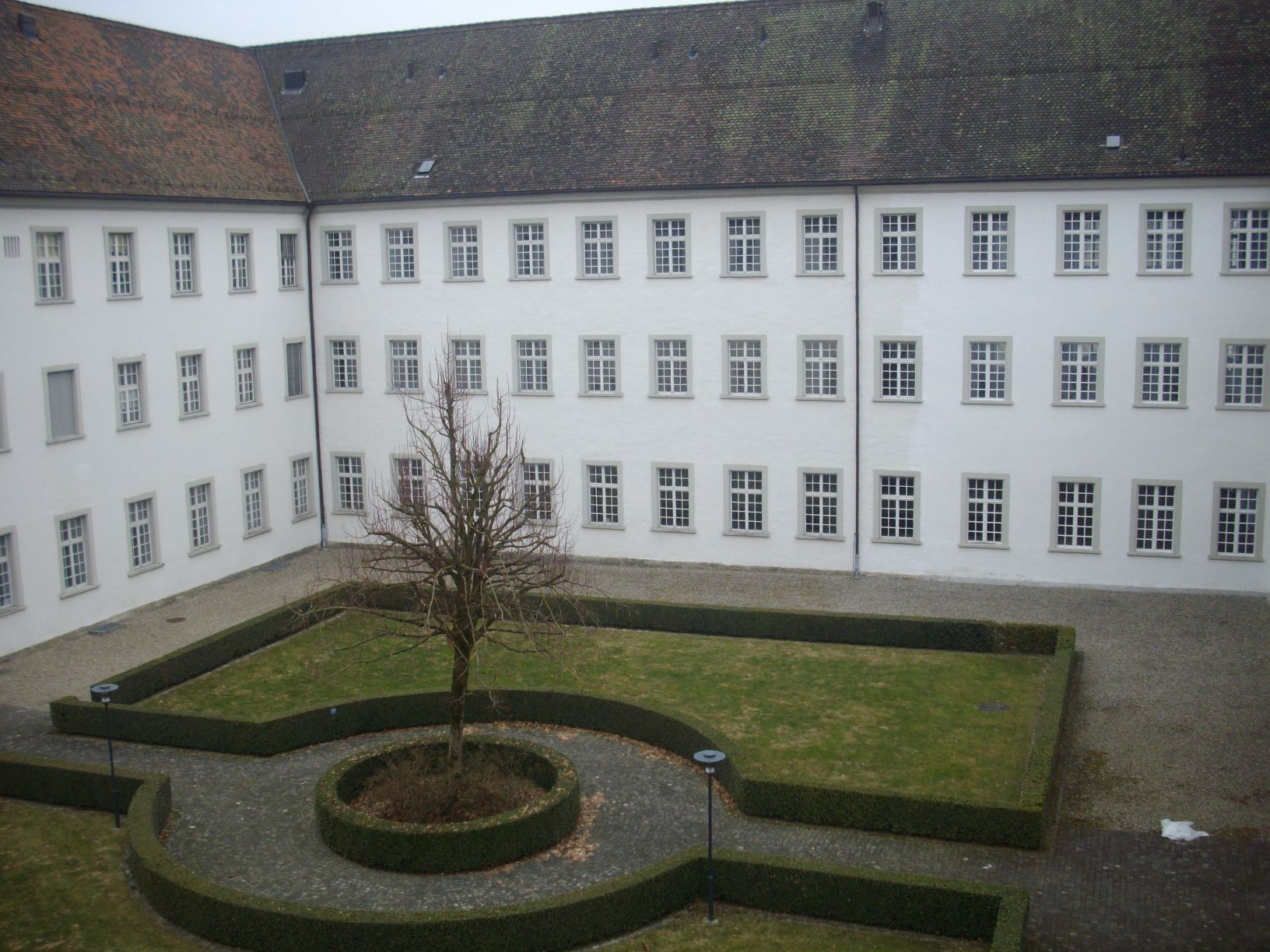
Courtyard of the Abbey

The monastery was founded in 1194 on a land grant from the Freiherren of Langenstein and of Kapfenberg. The mother church was Lucelle Abbey. It was first mentioned in 1196 as sanctus Urbanus and in 1201 as cenobium sancti Urbani.

The first monastery was a single monk's cell in Kleinroth, which is now in the municipality of Langenthal. In 1195, the first monks moved about 3 km (1.9 mi) down the valley to establish a larger monastery building. During the 13th century, the monastery expanded with land grants from local nobles and became a major landowner in the Langeten and Rot valleys. Over the following centuries it continued to expand acquiring property and rights throughout the region. By 1266, the monastery had become an abbey with an abbot who was also responsible for several surrounding nunneries. In 1234, a small monastery was founded in Gottesgarten near the village of Kleinroth. This monastery may have been a daughter house to St. Urban's until 1237 when it transferred to Olsberg. In 1280, the Abbey acquired a small chapel at Fribach, which became a local Marian pilgrimage site until the Protestant Reformation.

Starting in the middle of the 13th century, the monks in the Abbey gained citizenship in several surrounding towns. The Abbey owned farms in many of the surrounding villages and even owned a vineyard on the shores of Lake Biel. Also, in the 13th century, they established a brick factory which produced elaborate decorated bricks for export. This medieval brick operation eventually grew into the Roggwil AG brick factory which is still in operation.

In 1407 the city of Lucerne took over the Vogtei office over the Abbey, making the city the secular ruler over the Abbey. During the 1490s Lucerne began interfering with the monastery leadership to force St. Urban's to reform many aspects of monastic life. However, the reforms helped make the Abbey into a leading Cistercian house in Switzerland. The Abbey was secure enough that it weathered a devastating fire in 1513 without problems. In 1537, the abbot was raised to become a mitred abbot. However, the surrounding Swiss Confederation prevented the abbot from expanding his power or creating an ecclesiastical state around the Abbey.

During the 17th century, the Abbey supported the creation of a pan-German Cistercian council and the goals of the Counter-Reformation. During this time, the Abbey expanded both physically and socially. Increasingly, the monks at St. Urban's came from noble or patrician families. By the 19th century, the Abbey was home to an average of 20-50 members.

In 1690, Abbot Ulrich Glutz built a new baroque chapel to house the Ulrich chasuble relic, the vestment of St. Ulrich from the 10th Century, which had become a popular relic for pilgrims. Then, in 1711, Abbot Malachy Glutz had the Vorarlberg architect Franz Beer rebuild the church and convent buildings in the baroque style.

The first mention of a school at the Abbey was in 1470. By 1500, it became a center of humanism and reform scholarship. The school remained in operation over the following centuries and in 1780 it became the first teacher training college in Switzerland. From 1841-47 it was the cantonal teacher training college.

During the Helvetic Republic (1798-1803) the Abbey was placed under secular management and became the center of its own municipality. In 1814 the Abbey was assigned to the municipality of Pfaffnau. The last abbot, Friedrich Pfluger, initiated a series of reforms. However, shortly after his death in April 1848, the Abbey was secularized by the liberal cantonal government. The property, church treasure and choir pews were sold. The Abbey library was transferred to the cantonal archive and library. The monastery buildings changed hands several times after 1853. In 1859 the Basel silk industrialist Johann Jacob Richter-Linder bought the Abbey and converted it into a silk factory. In 1870, the Canton of Lucerne, bought the building complex back and established a psychiatric hospital there. This hospital opened in 1873 and remained in the Abbey until a new hospital was built in 1977-87. The village of Sankt Urban grew up around the hospital in the 1930s to provide housing for the hospital staff. Portions of the Abbey are now used for cultural purposes such as concerts or tours.

The Gottfried Keller Foundation aims the acquisition of major works from Switzerland and abroad, to entrust them as loans to Swiss museums or to return them to their original locations, such as the choir of the St. Urban Abbey. The collection comprises more than 8,500 paintings, sculptures and other art objects in around 110 museums respectively locations in Switzerland.
