= Morgenthaler (name) =

Origin
- Language: Swiss German or German
- Meaning: "Person from the Morning Valley"
- Region of origin: Switzerland or Germany

Other names
- Variant forms: Murgenthaler, Mergenthaler, Morgentaler
- Painting by W. Gorgé

Morgenthaler is a family name (or surname) from German speaking Europe.

== Origin ==
The name Morgenthaler means person from the morning valley. It developed from the description of a person coming from a place called Morning Valley; in ancient German orthography Morgen Thal. The final syllable (or suffix) -er signifies geographical origin of a person (as in English New Yorker). The distribution of the name in Europe and around the world leads to the conclusion of most probable origins of the name in Switzerland or in southern Germany.

== Distribution ==
Mainly in Switzerland (with an amassment in two Cantons of Switzerland: Bern and Aargau) and in Germany (with an amassment along the southern Rhine valley). By immigration also in Austria, France, the United States and other countries.

== Notable people with the name ==
- Walter Morgenthaler (1882–1965), Swiss psychiatry
- Otto Morgenthaler (1886–1973)
- Ernst Morgenthaler (1887–1962), Swiss painter
- Frederic Richard Morgenthaler (1933–2015), American electrical engineer and academician
- George William Morgenthaler, American mathematician
- Wendelin Morgenthaler (1888–1963), German politician (CDU)
- Hans Morgenthaler (1890–1928), Swiss poet
- Sasha Morgenthaler (1893–1975)
- Jeanne Morgenthaler (1885–1974), Swiss Olympic fencer
- Max Morgenthaler (1901–1980)
- Fritz Morgenthaler (1919–1984), Swiss psychoanalyst, physician and painter
- David Morgenthaler (1919–2016), American businessman, founder of Morgenthaler, U.S. private equity and venture capital firm
- Hans Morgenthaler (German writer) (born 1944), German writer
- Robert Morgenthaler (born 1952), Swiss jazz musician
- Jill Morgenthaler (1954–2019), U.S. Army Reserve Colonel, and Illinois politician
- Anders Morgenthaler (born 1972), Danish artist and author
  - Wulffmorgenthaler
- Bernhard Morgenthaler (born 1987), Austrian footballer
- Clemens Morgenthaler, German bass-baritone
- Harley Morgenthaler, pharmacist
- Donald Harley Morgenthaler, (1930-2001), pharmacist
- Wendelin Morgenthaler (1888–1963), German politician

== See also ==
- Mergenthaler
- Morgentaler
- Morgenthau
- Morgenstern (disambiguation)
