= Mergenthaler =

Mergenthaler is a German surname. Notable people with the surname include:

- Christian Mergenthaler (1884–1980), Nazi German politician and Ministerpräsident of Württemberg
- Ottmar Mergenthaler (1854–1899), German-American inventor of the Linotype machine
- Sara Mergenthaler (born 1979), American sports sailor

== See also ==
- Mergenthaler Linotype Company, a US corporation founded in 1886 to market the Linotype machine
- Mergenthaler Vocational-Technical High School, a trade school in Baltimore, Maryland
- Morgenthaler (name)
- Morgentaler
