= Rohrbach, Switzerland =

Rohrbach
- Municipality
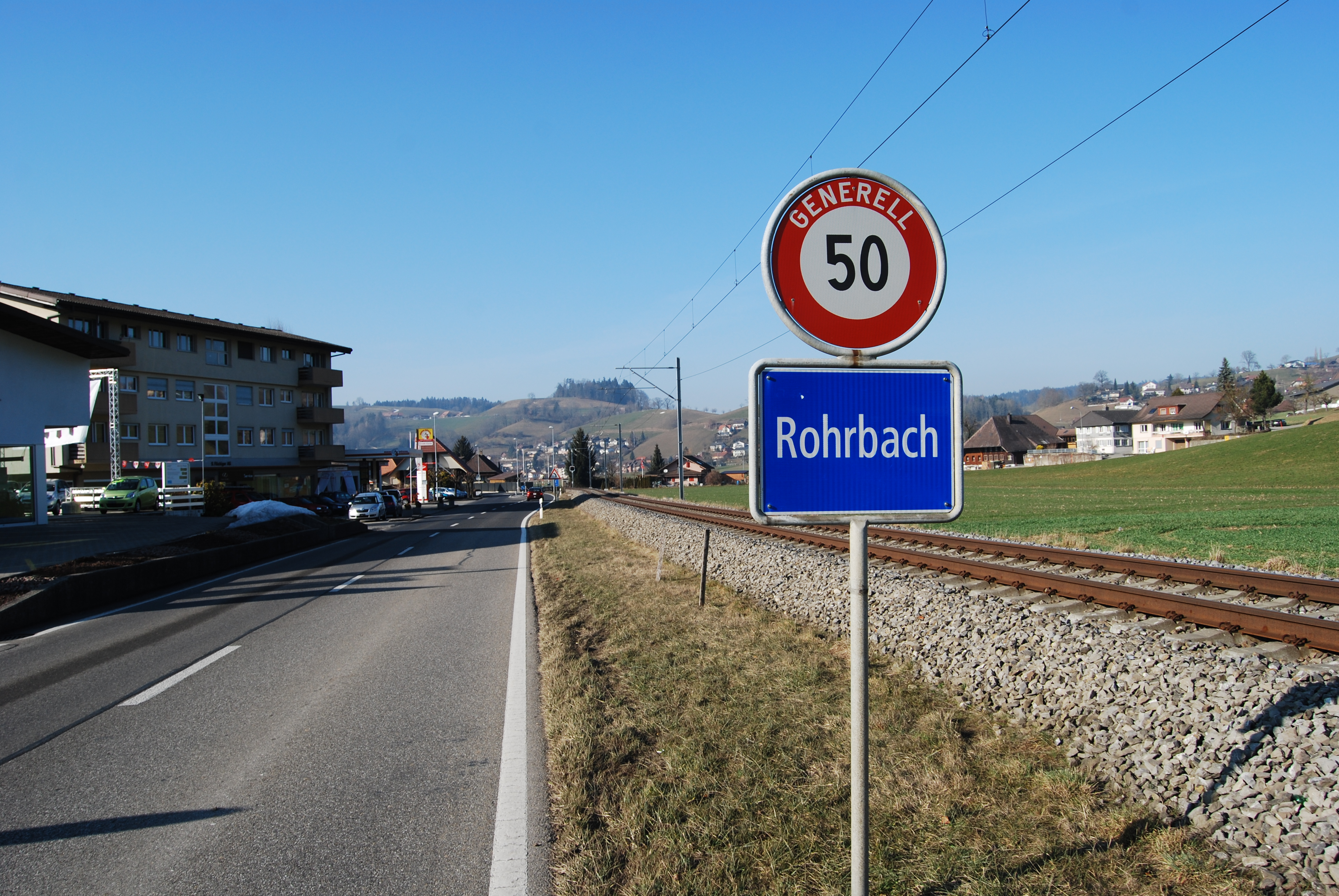

- Flag Coat of arms
- Location of Rohrbach
- Location within Switzerland Location within Canton of Bern
- Coordinates: 47°8′N 7°49′E
- Country: Switzerland
- Canton: Bern
- District: Oberaargau

Area
  - Total: 4.1 km^{2} (1.6 sq mi)
- Elevation: 584 m (1,916 ft)

Population (December 2020)
  - Total: 1,520
  - Density: 370/km^{2} (960/sq mi)
- Time zone: UTC+01:00 (CET)
  - Summer (DST): UTC+02:00 (CEST)
- Postal code: 4938
- SFOS number: 338
- ISO 3166 code: CH-BE
- Surrounded by: Auswil, Huttwil, Kleindietwil, Rohrbachgraben
- Website: rohrbach-be.ch

Rohrbach (Swiss Standard German pronunciation: [ˈroːrbax]) is a municipality in the Oberaargau administrative district in the canton of Bern in Switzerland.

== History ==
Rohrbach was first mentioned in 795 as Roorbah when a local noble, Heribold, gave his lands in Madiswil to the church in Rohrbach. In the 9th century some land around the village was given to the Abbey of St. Gall. The Abbey established an administrator in Rohrbach to manage their lands in the Oberaargau region. Since the Abbey was an Imperial Abbey, the administrator and the landholders on the Abbey's land had immunity from the local count's court and could only be arrested or tried by the Abbey court. At the beginning of the 14th century the bailiwick and the low court of the local Barons of Ruti. Between 1314 and 1370 both offices were held by the Count of Signau and after 1371 by the Count of Grünenberg. The Grünenberg Counts incorporated the village into their personal territory. Hermann of Eptingen then acquired the rule over the village by marriage. He supported the Austrian Habsburgs in the Old Zürich War (1440–46) and lost the village to a Bernese army. After the war, the village was returned to his wife in 1449. In 1504 Bern bought the entire village from Hermann's decedents. In 1505 the village was incorporated into the bailiwick of Wangen. However, Rohrbach retained several special privileges. They were exempt from forced labor for the bailiff and in wars they marched under the banner of the city of Bern. After the 1798 French invasion it was part of the District of Langenthal in the Helvetic Republic and in 1803 it went to the District of Aarwangen.

The village church, St. Martin's Church, was first mentioned in 795. The current building was built in 1738. Originally the church belonged to the Abbey of St. Gall, but in 1345 it was sold to the Knights Hospitaller Thunstetten Commandery. When the Commandery was secularized in 1528 during the Protestant Reformation, its properties, including St. Martin's, went to Bern.

Starting in the 18th century cottage industry weaving began to supplement agriculture as a source of income. In 1889 the Langenthal-Huttwil-Wolhusen railroad opened a station in Rohrbach, which promoted industrialization in the village. As of 2005, over half of all jobs in the village are in manufacturing while many residents commute to Langenthal for work. Around 1980 the new housing development of Riedmatt opened to provide housing for a growing population.

== Geography ==
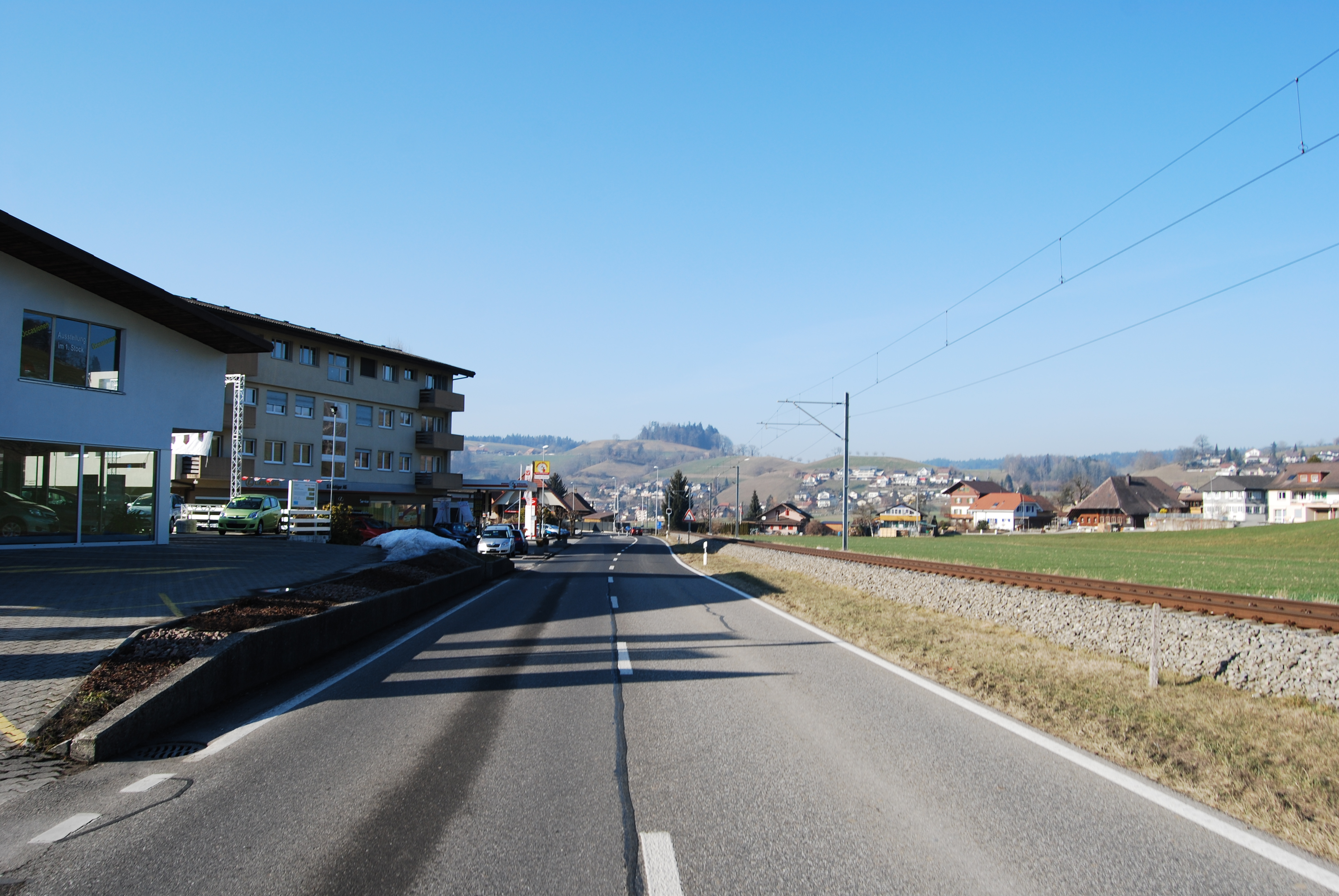
Rohrbach village and surroundings

Aerial view from 400 m by Walter Mittelholzer (1922)

Rohrbach has an area of 4.08 km^{2} (1.58 sq mi). Of this area, 2.57 km^{2} (0.99 mi^{2}) or 62.8% is used for agricultural purposes, while 0.82 km^{2} (0.32 mi^{2}) or 20.0% is forested. Of the rest of the land, 0.65 km^{2} (0.25 mi^{2}) or 15.9% is settled (buildings or roads), 0.01 km^{2} (2.5 acres) or 0.2% is either rivers or lakes and 0.01 km^{2} (2.5 acres) or 0.2% is unproductive land.

Of the built up area, industrial buildings made up 3.4% of the total area while housing and buildings made up 9.8% and transportation infrastructure made up 1.7%. Out of the forested land, 18.1% of the total land area is heavily forested and 2.0% is covered with orchards or small clusters of trees. Of the agricultural land, 37.2% is used for growing crops and 23.7% is pastures, while 2.0% is used for orchards or vine crops. All the water in the municipality is flowing water.

The municipality is located in the Oberaargau region. It consists of the village of Rohrbach and a number of hamlets including Boden, Brand, Kasern and Sossau as well as scattered farm houses.

On 31 December 2009 Amtsbezirk Aarwangen, the municipality's former district, was dissolved. On the following day, 1 January 2010, it joined the newly created Verwaltungskreis Oberaargau.

== Coat of arms ==
The blazon of the municipal coat of arms is Gules a Mullet Or on a Mount of Six Coupeaux Vert.

== Demographics ==
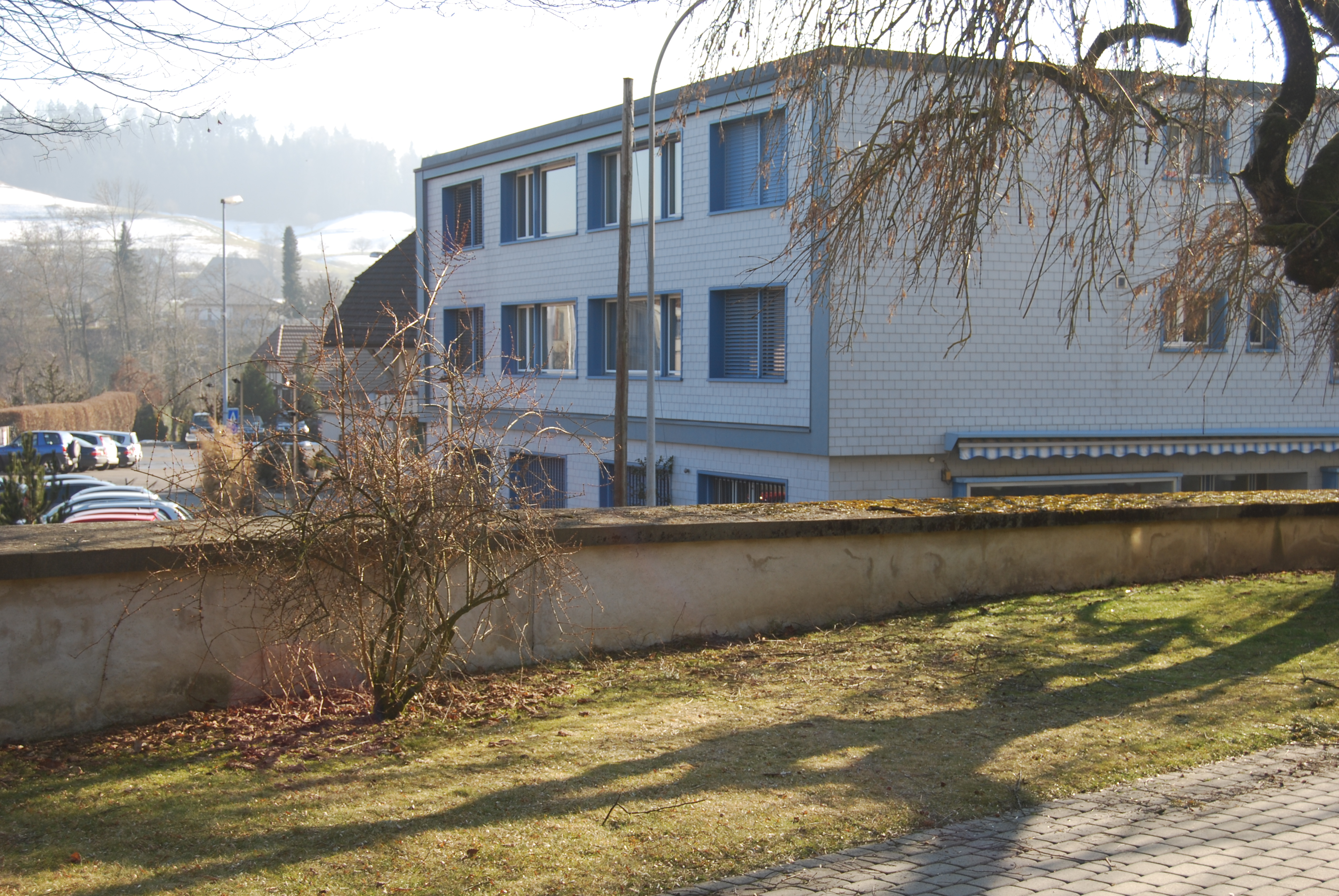
Modern small apartment in Rohrbach

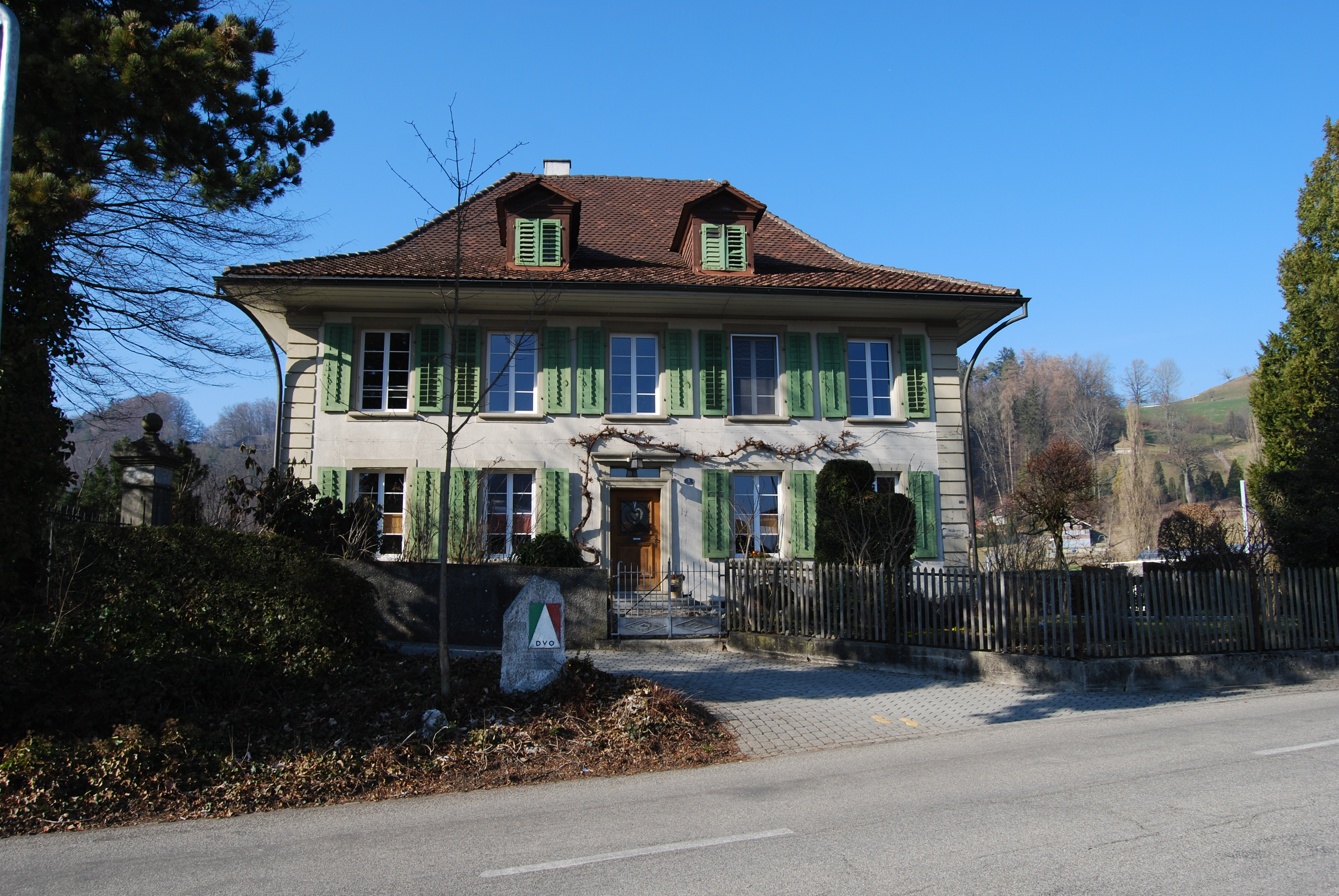
House in Rohrbach

Rohrbach has a population (as of December 2020) of 1,520. As of 2010, 7.6% of the population are resident foreign nationals. Over the last 10 years (2000–2010) the population has changed at a rate of 1.2%. Migration accounted for 4%, while births and deaths accounted for -2.5%.

Most of the population (as of 2000) speaks German (1,311 or 96.1%) as their first language, Albanian is the second most common (11 or 0.8%) and Serbo-Croatian is the third (10 or 0.7%). There are 3 people who speak French, 3 people who speak Italian.

As of 2008, the population was 48.7% male and 51.3% female. The population was made up of 656 Swiss men (44.9% of the population) and 55 (3.8%) non-Swiss men. There were 694 Swiss women (47.5%) and 56 (3.8%) non-Swiss women. Of the population in the municipality, 529 or about 38.8% were born in Rohrbach and lived there in 2000. There were 553 or 40.5% who were born in the same canton, while 178 or 13.0% were born somewhere else in Switzerland, and 86 or 6.3% were born outside of Switzerland.

As of 2010, children and teenagers (0–19 years old) make up 21.5% of the population, while adults (20–64 years old) make up 59.4% and seniors (over 64 years old) make up 19.1%.

As of 2000, there were 536 people who were single and never married in the municipality. There were 662 married individuals, 113 widows or widowers and 53 individuals who are divorced.

As of 2000, there were 183 households that consist of only one person and 35 households with five or more people. In 2000, a total of 575 apartments (91.6% of the total) were permanently occupied, while 26 apartments (4.1%) were seasonally occupied and 27 apartments (4.3%) were empty. The vacancy rate for the municipality, in 2011, was 1.41%.

The historical population is given in the following chart:

== Sights ==
The entire village of Rohrbach is designated as part of the Inventory of Swiss Heritage Sites.

== Politics ==
In the 2011 federal election the most popular party was the SVP which received 37.9% of the vote. The next three most popular parties were the BDP Party (16.1%), the SPS (15.9%) and the EVP Party (8%). In the federal election, a total of 437 votes were cast, and the voter turnout was 37.4%.

== Economy ==
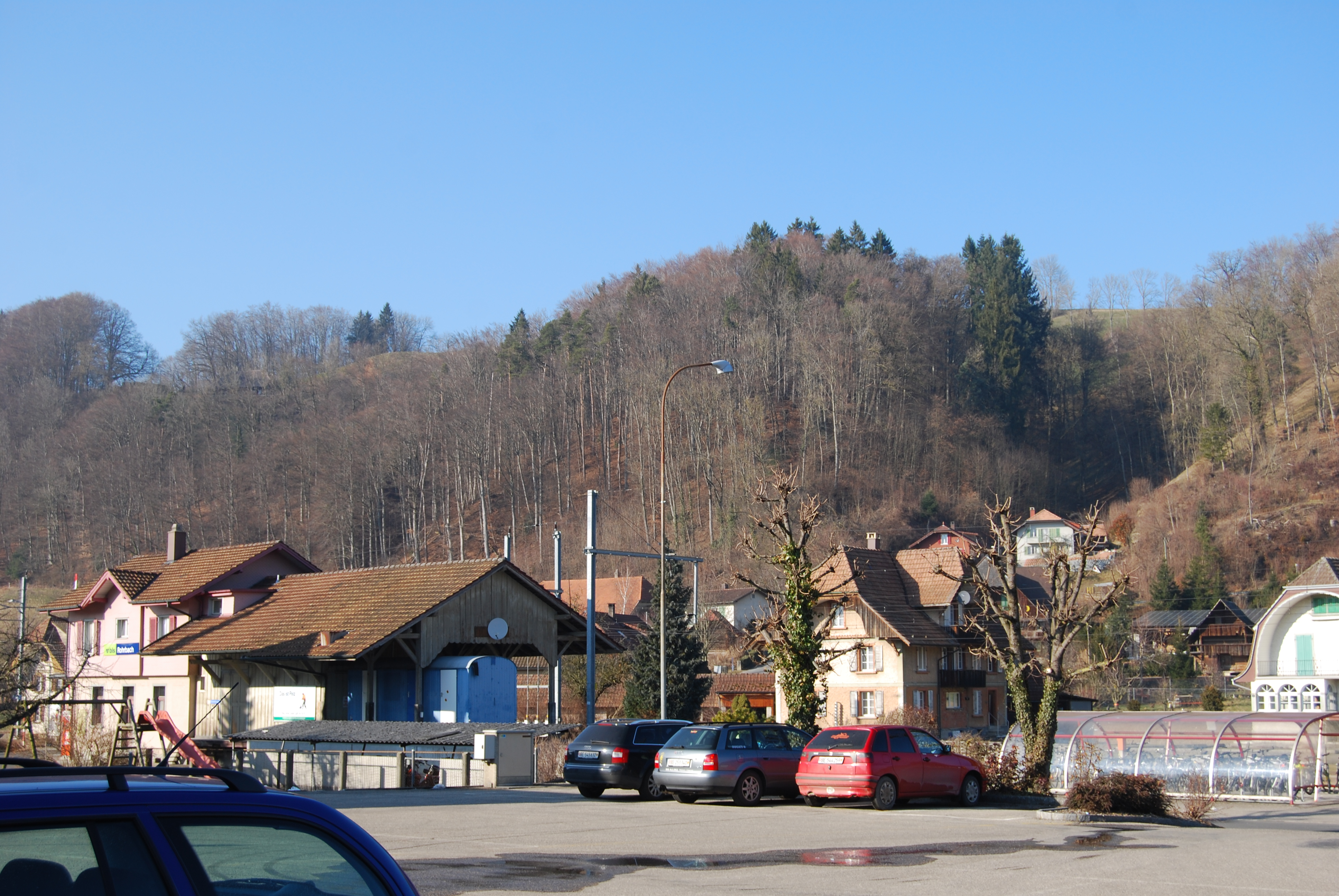
Rohrbach's train station

As of 2011, Rohrbach had an unemployment rate of 1.63%. As of 2008, there were a total of 527 people employed in the municipality. Of these, there were 41 people employed in the primary economic sector and about 20 businesses involved in this sector. 314 people were employed in the secondary sector and there were 21 businesses in this sector. 172 people were employed in the tertiary sector, with 44 businesses in this sector.

In 2008 there were a total of 446 full-time equivalent jobs. The number of jobs in the primary sector was 29, all of which were in agriculture. The number of jobs in the secondary sector was 290 of which 165 or (56.9%) were in manufacturing and 125 (43.1%) were in construction. The number of jobs in the tertiary sector was 127. In the tertiary sector; 40 or 31.5% were in wholesale or retail sales or the repair of motor vehicles, 32 or 25.2% were in the movement and storage of goods, 8 or 6.3% were in a hotel or restaurant, 1 was the insurance or financial industry, 7 or 5.5% were technical professionals or scientists, 13 or 10.2% were in education and 12 or 9.4% were in health care.

In 2000, there were 287 workers who commuted into the municipality and 482 workers who commuted away. The municipality is a net exporter of workers, with about 1.7 workers leaving the municipality for every one entering. Of the working population, 11.6% used public transportation to get to work, and 60.5% used a private car.

== Religion ==
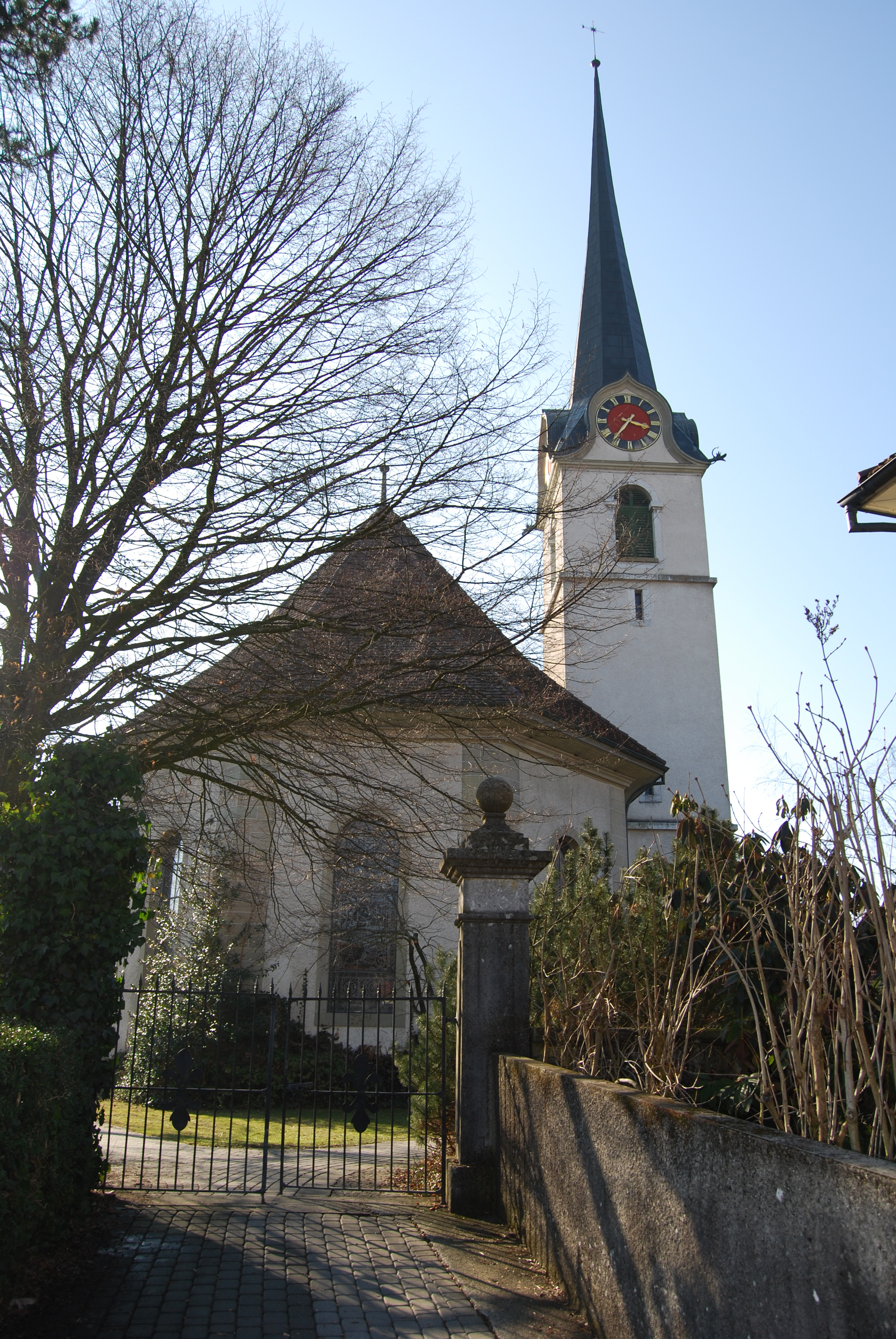
Reformed church of Rohrbach

From the 2000 census, 84 or 6.2% were Roman Catholic, while 1,138 or 83.4% belonged to the Swiss Reformed Church. Of the rest of the population, there were 61 individuals (or about 4.47% of the population) who belonged to another Christian church. There were 13 (or about 0.95% of the population) who were Islamic. There were 26 individuals who were Hindu. 51 (or about 3.74% of the population) belonged to no church, are agnostic or atheist, and 21 individuals (or about 1.54% of the population) did not answer the question.

== Education ==
In Rohrbach about 572 or (41.9%) of the population have completed non-mandatory upper secondary education, and 115 or (8.4%) have completed additional higher education (either university or a Fachhochschule). Of the 115 who completed tertiary schooling, 75.7% were Swiss men, 20.0% were Swiss women.

The Canton of Bern school system provides one year of non-obligatory Kindergarten, followed by six years of Primary school. This is followed by three years of obligatory lower Secondary school where the students are separated according to ability and aptitude. Following the lower Secondary students may attend additional schooling or they may enter an apprenticeship.

During the 2009–10 school year, there were a total of 161 students attending classes in Rohrbach. There were 2 kindergarten classes with a total of 29 students in the municipality. Of the kindergarten students, 6.9% were permanent or temporary residents of Switzerland (not citizens) and 10.3% have a different mother language than the classroom language. The municipality had 6 primary classes and 106 students. Of the primary students, 9.4% were permanent or temporary residents of Switzerland (not citizens) and 9.4% have a different mother language than the classroom language. During the same year, there was one lower secondary class with a total of 26 students. There were 23.1% who were permanent or temporary residents of Switzerland (not citizens) and 19.2% have a different mother language than the classroom language.

As of 2000, there were 13 students in Rohrbach who came from another municipality, while 100 residents attended schools outside the municipality.
