= Gutenburg, Switzerland =

Gutenburg
- Former municipality
- Flag Coat of arms
- Location of Gutenburg
- Location within Switzerland Location within Canton of Bern
- Coordinates: 47°11′N 7°48′E
- Country: Switzerland
- Canton: Bern
- District: Aarwangen

Area
  - Total: 0.6 km^{2} (0.23 sq mi)
- Elevation: 520 m (1,710 ft)

Population (January 2005)
  - Total: 120
  - Density: 200/km^{2} (520/sq mi)
- Time zone: UTC+01:00 (CET)
  - Summer (DST): UTC+02:00 (CEST)
- Postal code: 4932
- SFOS number: 327
- ISO 3166 code: CH-BE
- Website: SFSO statistics

Gutenburg is a village in the canton of Bern, Switzerland. On June 7, 2006, the independent municipality decided to merge into the municipality of Madiswil. The merger was completed on January 1, 2007.
