= Ernst Morgenthaler =

Swiss painter (1887–1962)

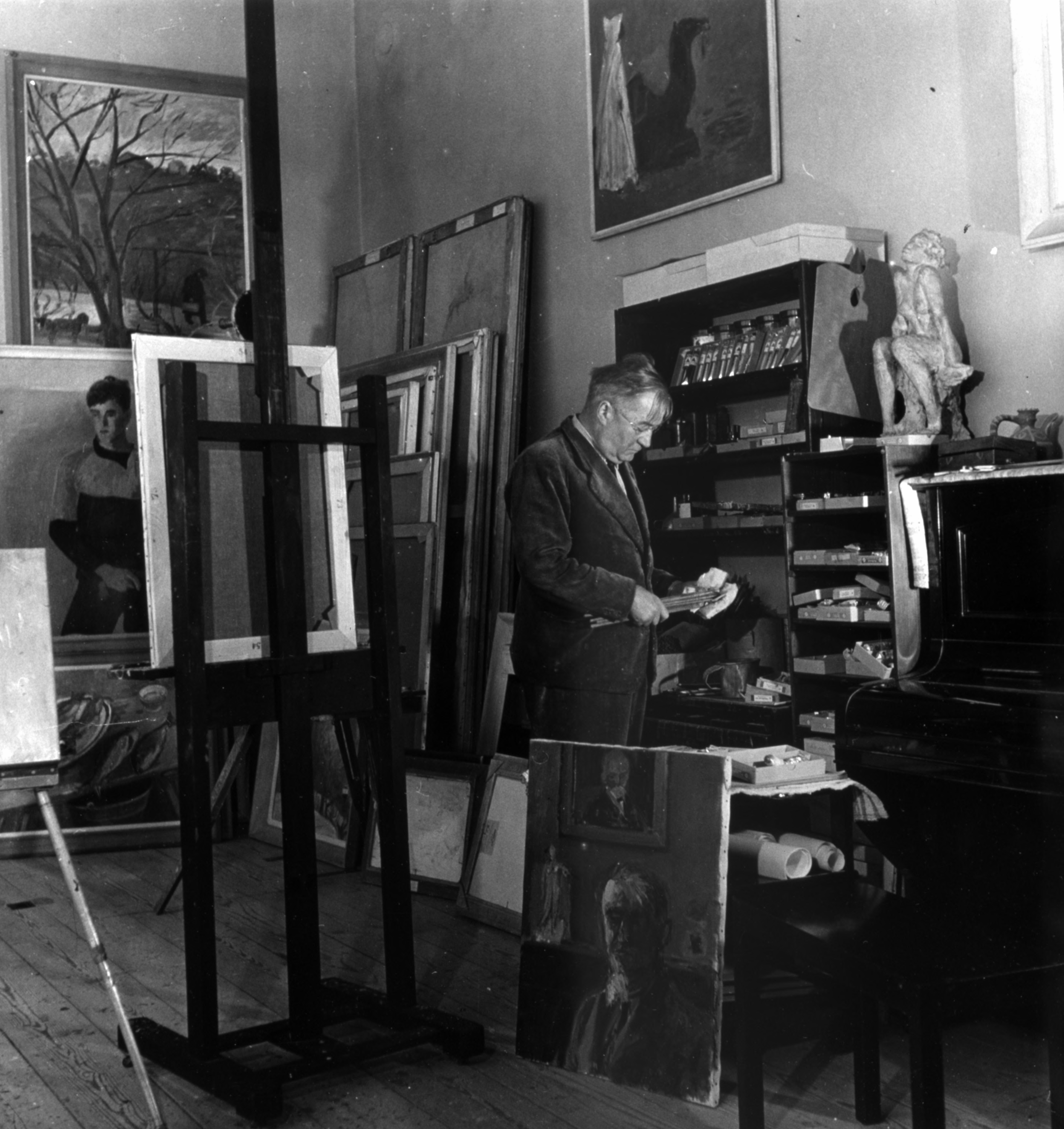
- Born: 11 December 1887; Kleindietwil, Switzerland
- Died: 7 September 1962 (aged 74); Zürich, Switzerland
- Known for: Painting, drawing, graphic art
- Spouse: Sasha Morgenthaler

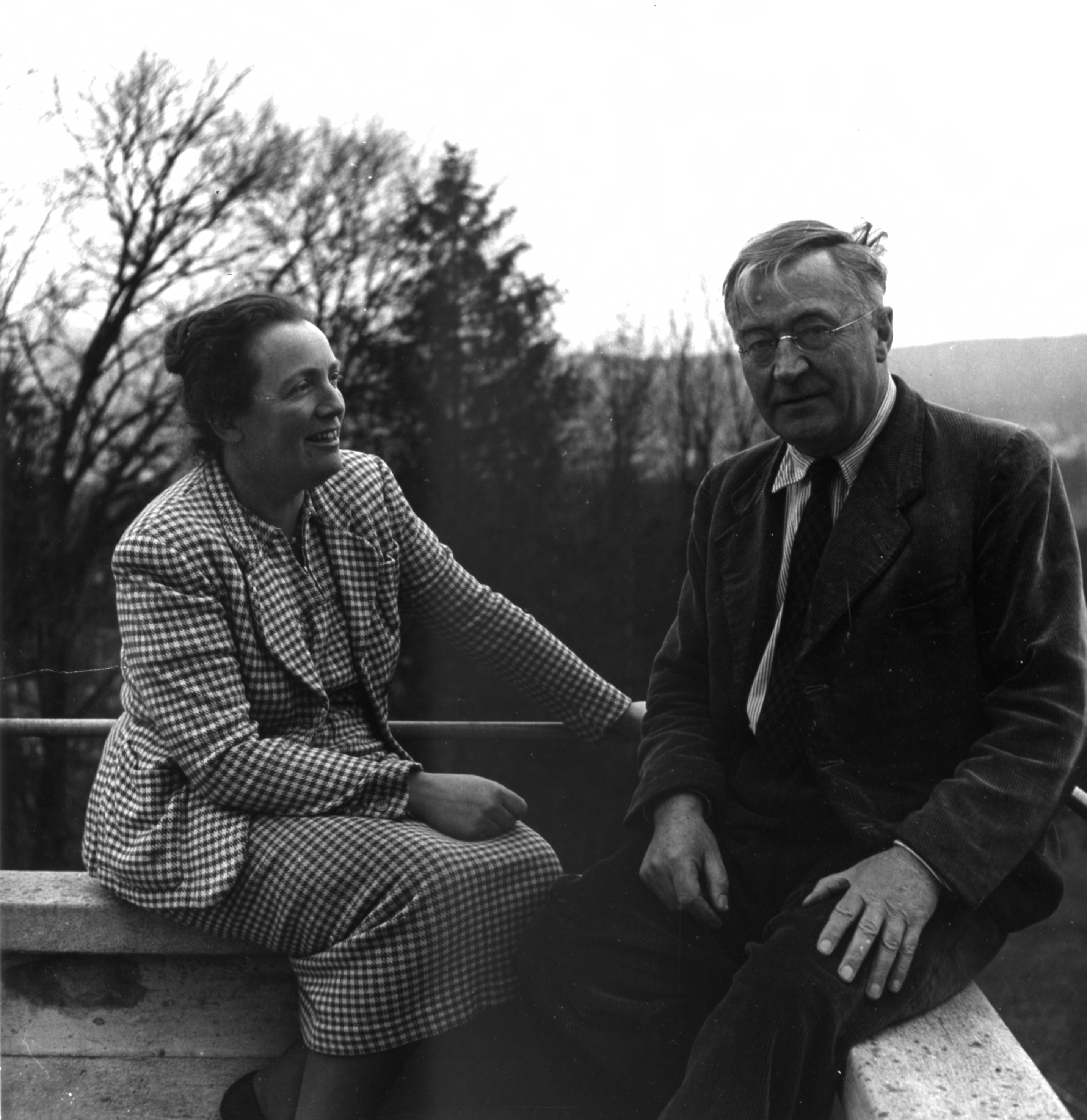
Ernst and Sasha Morgenthaler, c. 1949

Ernst Morgenthaler (11 December 1887 – 7 September 1962) was a Swiss painter and graphic artist associated with figurative Swiss painting. He trained with Cuno Amiet and later painted landscapes, portraits and scenes from everyday life. He also worked in murals and lithography, and served as president of the Swiss Federal Art Commission from 1951 to 1953.

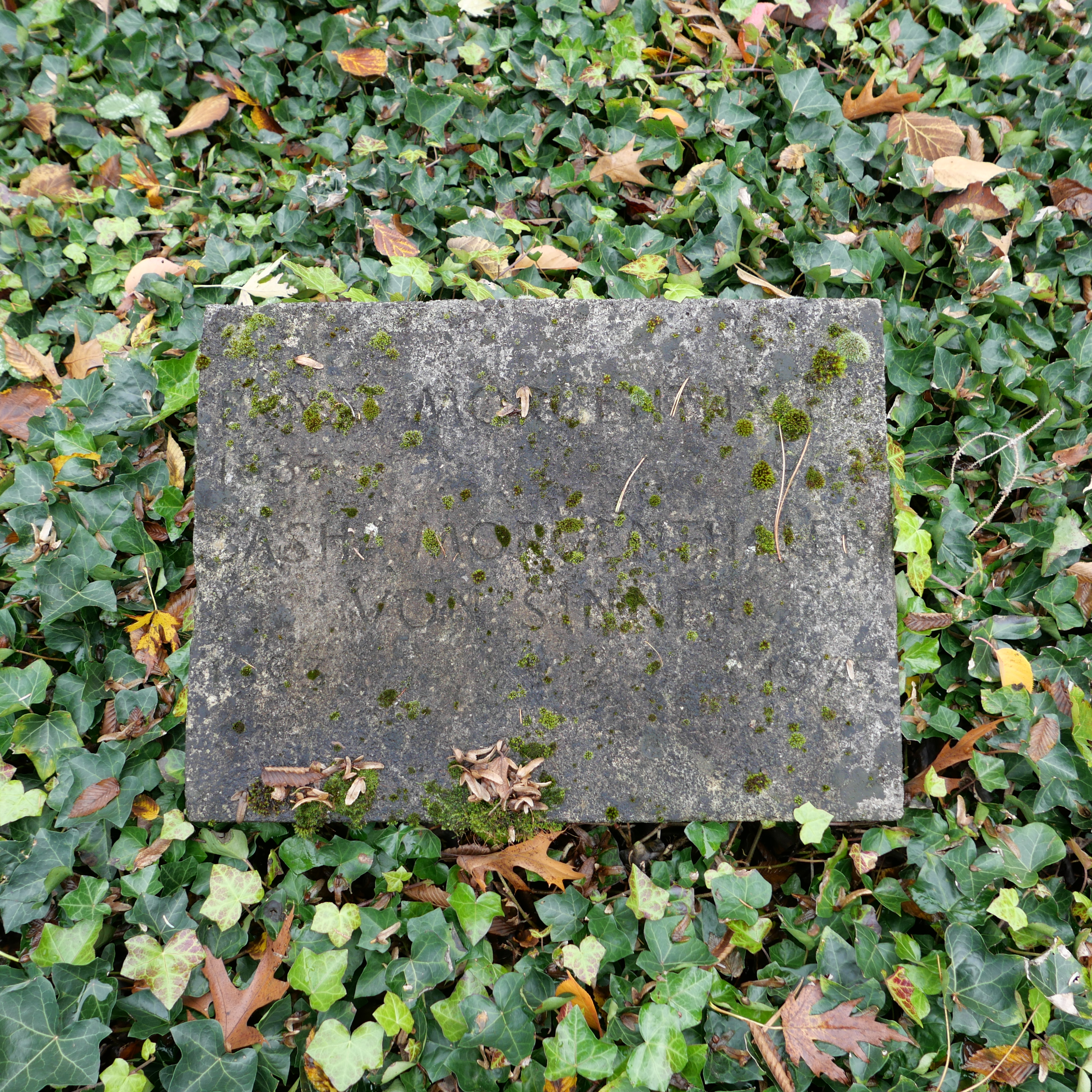
Grave marker of Ernst and Sasha Morgenthaler at Hönggerberg cemetery

== Biography ==
Ernst Morgenthaler was born in Kleindietwil, Switzerland, on 11 December 1887. Before becoming an artist, he worked in the silk trade. He also drew caricatures for the Swiss satirical magazine Nebelspalter.

Morgenthaler took drawing courses in Zürich and Berlin before studying with Cuno Amiet at Oschwand in 1914. There, he developed his technique in oil painting and met Sasha von Sinner, whom he married in 1916. She later became known for her Sasha dolls. Their children included Fritz Morgenthaler. The following year, he attended Heinrich Knirr's painting school in Munich, where he met Paul Klee.

From 1916, Morgenthaler lived in several places in Switzerland. He moved to Küsnacht, Zürich, in 1923. In 1928, he travelled to Morocco with his wife, and later that year the family moved to Meudon, near Paris. He returned to Zürich in 1931 and established a studio-house in Zürich-Höngg.

In 1945, he spent several weeks with Hermann Hesse in Montagnola while painting his portrait. From 1951 to 1953, he was president of the Swiss Federal Art Commission. He died in Zürich on 7 September 1962.

== Work ==
Morgenthaler was associated with figurative Swiss painting. His practice included painting, watercolour, drawing, murals and lithographs. His subjects included landscapes, interiors, portraits, self-portraits, still lifes and family scenes.

His paintings often drew on his immediate surroundings and everyday life. They were noted for a poetic quality and an often spontaneous, sketch-like handling.

Portraiture was part of his practice from early in his artistic career. His portraits included members of his family and people from his artistic circle.

Morgenthaler's works were acquired by the Swiss Confederation, art associations and private collectors. They are held by several Swiss museums, including the Aargauer Kunsthaus, Kunstmuseum Bern, Kunstmuseum Solothurn, Kunstmuseum Thun, Kunstmuseum Winterthur and Kunsthaus Zürich.

== Exhibitions ==
Morgenthaler’s exhibition career developed from around 1920. His later solo exhibitions included shows at Kunsthaus Zürich in 1938 and 1960–1961, Kunstmuseum Solothurn and Kunsthalle Bern in 1945, Kunsthalle Basel in 1948 and 1962, Kunstmuseum St. Gallen in 1950, Kunstsammlung Thun in 1953, and Kunsthaus Glarus and Kunsthalle Bern in 1957.

In 2015, Kunstmuseum Thun presented Der Kontinent Morgenthaler: Eine Künstlerfamilie und ihr Freundeskreis, an exhibition on the Morgenthaler family and its artistic circle. The exhibition took Ernst Morgenthaler’s painting career as its starting point.

== Selected work ==
Morgenthaler's 1922 portrait Der Maler von Tscharner depicts the painter Johann von Tscharner and is held by the Aargauer Kunsthaus. The painting has been noted for its strong colour contrasts and organised composition.

== Legacy ==
After Morgenthaler’s death in 1962, works from his estate entered the collection of Kunstmuseum Thun.
