= Leimiswil =

- Former municipality
- Flag Coat of arms
- Location of Leimiswil
- Location within Switzerland Location within Canton of Bern
- Coordinates: 47°9′N 7°46′E
- Country: Switzerland
- Canton: Bern
- District: Oberaargau

Area
  - Total: 4.6 km^{2} (1.8 sq mi)
- Elevation: 602 m (1,975 ft)

Population (31 December 2010)
  - Total: 398
  - Density: 87/km^{2} (220/sq mi)
- Time zone: UTC+01:00 (CET)
  - Summer (DST): UTC+02:00 (CEST)
- Postal code: 4935
- SFOS number: 330
- ISO 3166 code: CH-BE
- Surrounded by: Kleindietwil, Madiswil, Ochlenberg, Rütschelen, Ursenbach
- Website: www.leimiswil.ch

Leimiswil is a former municipality in the Oberaargau administrative district in the canton of Bern in Switzerland. On 1 January 2011 Kleindietwil and Leimiswil were merged with the municipality of Madiswil.

== Geography ==
Leimiswil has an area, as of 2009, of 4.65 km^{2} (1.80 sq mi). Of this area, 3.51 km^{2} (1.36 sq mi) or 75.5% is used for agricultural purposes, while 0.87 km^{2} (0.34 sq mi) or 18.7% is forested. Of the rest of the land, 0.25 km^{2} (0.097 sq mi) or 5.4% is settled (buildings or roads).

Of the built up area, housing and buildings made up 3.2% and transportation infrastructure made up 1.7%. 17.0% of the total land area is heavily forested and 1.7% is covered with orchards or small clusters of trees. Of the agricultural land, 37.8% is used for growing crops and 35.5% is pastures, while 2.2% is used for orchards or vine crops.

== Demographics ==
Leimiswil has a population (as of 31 December 2010) of 398. As of 2007, 1.7% of the population was made up of foreign nationals. Over the last 10 years the population has decreased at a rate of -9.1%. Most of the population (as of 2000) speaks German (95.9%), with Albanian being second most common (2.0%) and Portuguese being third (0.9%).

In the 2007 election the most popular party was the SVP which received 54.5% of the vote. The next three most popular parties were the FDP (12.5%), the Small right-wing parties (10.4%) and the SPS (10.1%).

The age distribution of the population (as of 2000) is children and teenagers (0–19 years old) make up 25.2% of the population, while adults (20–64 years old) make up 59% and the seniors (over 64 years old) make up 15.8%. The entire Swiss population is generally well educated. In Leimiswil about 69.5% of the population (between age 25-64) have completed either non-mandatory upper secondary education or additional higher education (either University or a Fachhochschule).

Leimiswil has an unemployment rate of 0.8%. As of 2005, there were 97 people employed in the primary economic sector and about 36 businesses involved in this sector. 89 people are employed in the secondary sector and there are 8 businesses in this sector. 50 people are employed in the tertiary sector, with 12 businesses in this sector.
