= Auswil =

- Municipality
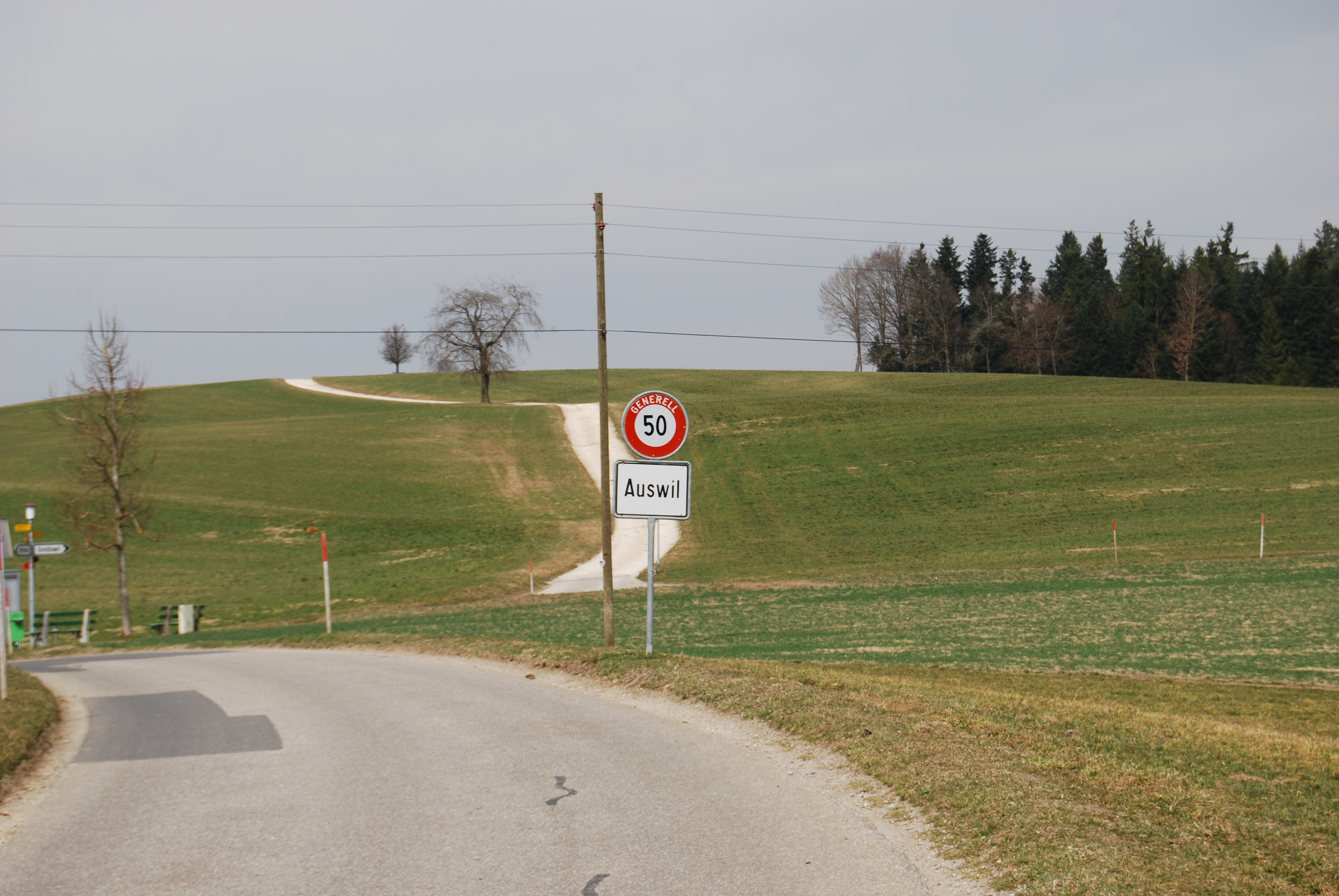

- Flag Coat of arms
- Location of Auswil
- Location within Switzerland Location within Canton of Bern
- Coordinates: 47°8′N 7°50′E
- Country: Switzerland
- Canton: Bern
- District: Oberaargau

Area
  - Total: 4.6 km^{2} (1.8 sq mi)
- Elevation: 650 m (2,130 ft)

Population (December 2020)
  - Total: 448
  - Density: 97/km^{2} (250/sq mi)
- Time zone: UTC+01:00 (CET)
  - Summer (DST): UTC+02:00 (CEST)
- Postal code: 4944
- SFOS number: 322
- ISO 3166 code: CH-BE
- Surrounded by: Gondiswil, Huttwil, Kleindietwil, Madiswil, Rohrbach
- Website: www.auswil.ch

Auswil is a municipality in the Oberaargau administrative district in the canton of Bern in Switzerland.

== History ==
Auswil is first mentioned around 855-860 as Ouvistwilare.

During the High Middle Ages the villages were protected by a fort on the Rohrbachberg. Around 1300, this fort was occupied by a Ministerialis family (unfree knights in the service of the Kyburgs). In 1318 or 1323 this fort was destroyed by Bern. Through a series of gifts between the 9th and 14th centuries, Auswil was gradually given to the Abbey of St. Gall. Under the Abbey, Auswil was part of the municipality of Rohrbach. It first began to act as an independent municipality in the 19th century. In 1826, Auswil's first school opened, though the community of Rohrbachberg remained part of the Rohrbach school district. Agriculture remains a major part of the local economy with almost half of all jobs in this sector.

== Geography ==
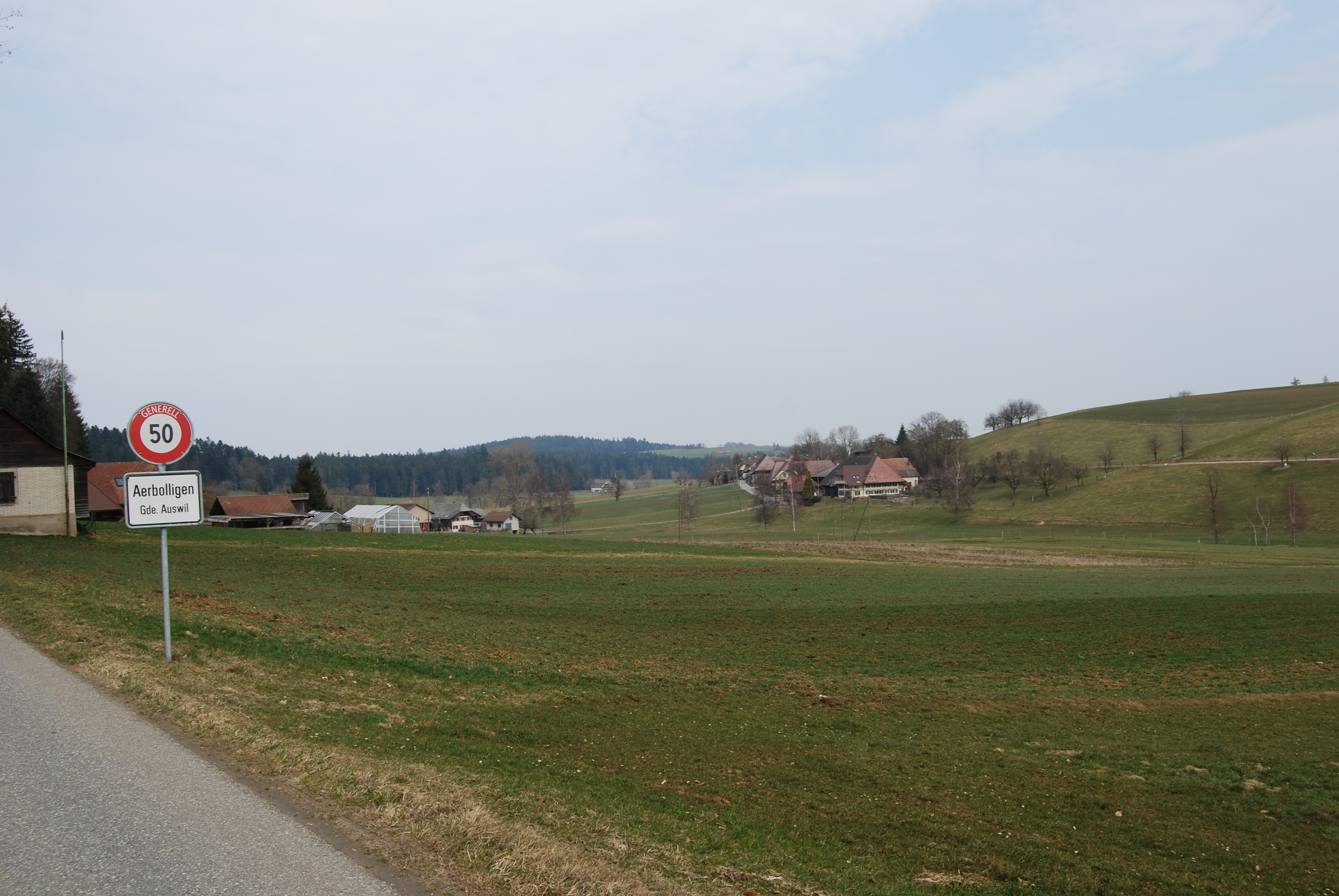
Aerbolligen in the municipality of Auswil

Auswil has an area of 4.62 km^{2} (1.78 sq mi). Of this area, 3.84 km^{2} (1.48 mi^{2}) or 82.6% is used for agricultural purposes, while 0.52 km^{2} (0.20 mi^{2}) or 11.2% is forested. Of the rest of the land, 0.23 km^{2} (0.089 mi^{2}) or 4.9% is settled (buildings or roads), 0.01 km^{2} (2.5 acres) or 0.2% is either rivers or lakes.

Of the built up area, housing and buildings made up 2.8% and transportation infrastructure made up 1.9%. Out of the forested land, all of the forested land area is covered with heavy forests. Of the agricultural land, 48.2% is used for growing crops and 30.8% is pastures, while 3.7% is used for orchards or vine crops. All the water in the municipality is flowing water.

The municipality consists of the hamlets of Oberauswil and Niederauswil, Aerbolligen, Hermandingen and Rohrbachberg.

== Coat of arms ==
The blazon of the municipal coat of arms is Argent a Semi Bear rampant couped Sable langued Gules and on a Chief of the last five Mullets Or, three and two.

== Demographics ==
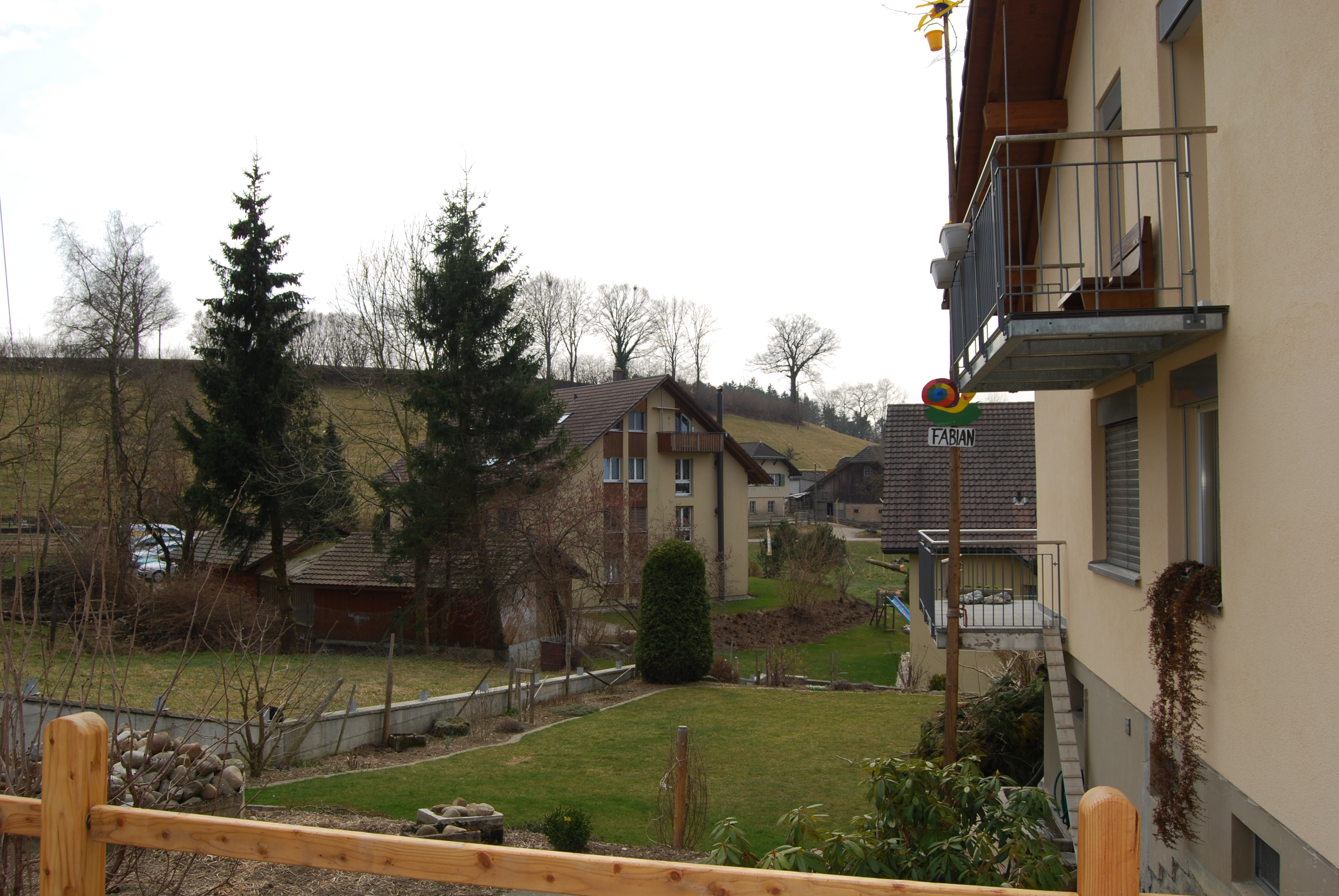
Newer apartment buildings in Auswil

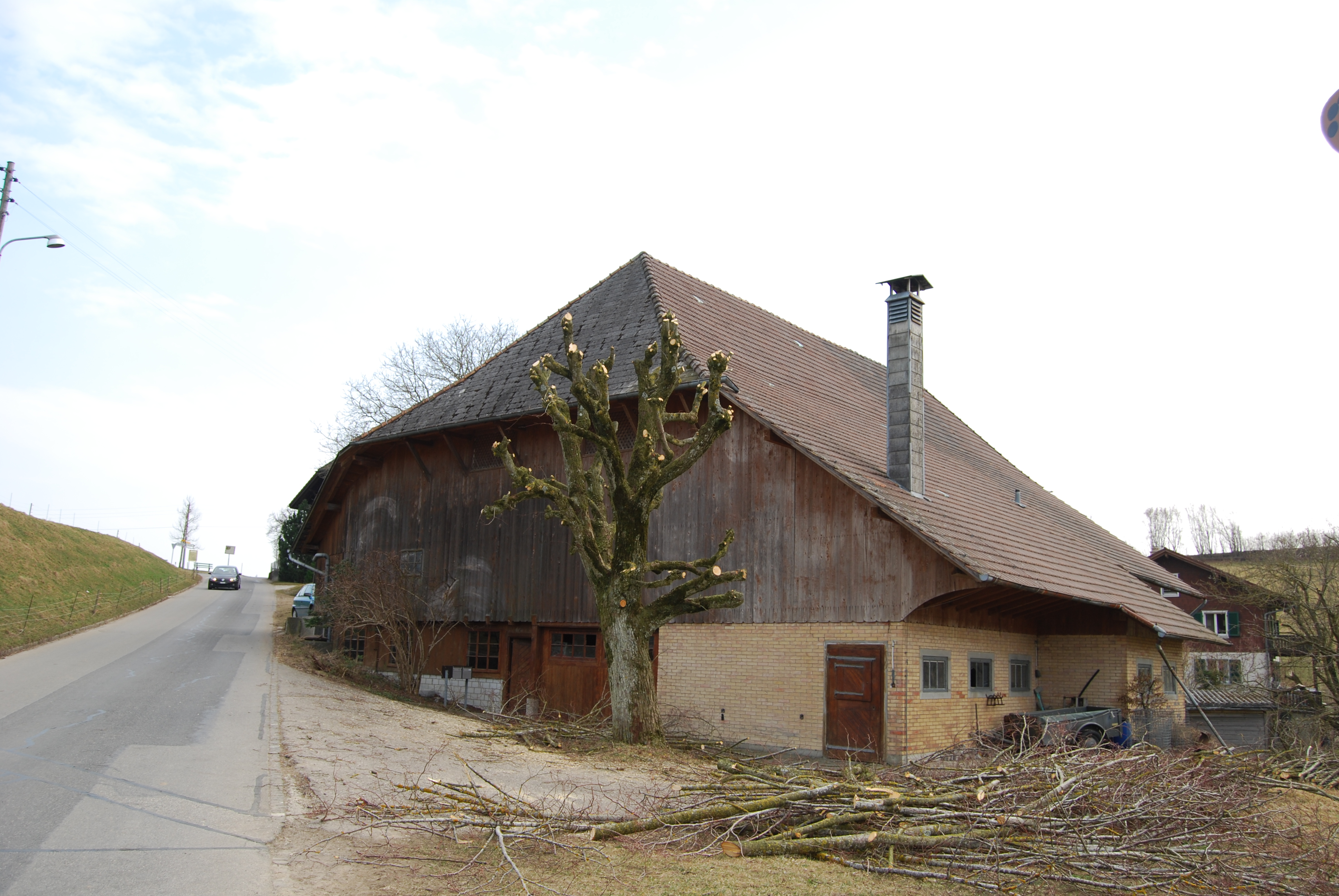
Farm house in Auswil

Auswil has a population (as of December 2020) of 448. As of 2010, 1.7% of the population are resident foreign nationals. Over the last 10 years (2000-2010) the population has changed at a rate of -11.4%. Migration accounted for -9.7%, while births and deaths accounted for -1.4%.

Most of the population (as of 2000) speaks German (501 or 99.2%) as their first language.

As of 2008, the population was 52.7% male and 47.3% female. The population was made up of 236 Swiss men (51.4% of the population) and 6 (1.3%) non-Swiss men. There were 215 Swiss women (46.8%) and 2 (0.4%) non-Swiss women. Of the population in the municipality, 204 or about 40.4% were born in Auswil and lived there in 2000. There were 220 or 43.6% who were born in the same canton, while 60 or 11.9% were born somewhere else in Switzerland, and 16 or 3.2% were born outside of Switzerland.

As of 2010, children and teenagers (0–19 years old) make up 19.2% of the population, while adults (20–64 years old) make up 64.7% and seniors (over 64 years old) make up 16.1%.

As of 2000, there were 228 people who were single and never married in the municipality. There were 241 married individuals, 28 widows or widowers and 8 individuals who are divorced.

As of 2000, there were 47 households that consist of only one person and 26 households with five or more people. In 2000, a total of 184 apartments (91.5% of the total) were permanently occupied, while 6 apartments (3.0%) were seasonally occupied and 11 apartments (5.5%) were empty. The vacancy rate for the municipality, in 2011, was 0.94%.

The historical population is given in the following chart:

== Politics ==
In the 2011 federal election the most popular party was the SVP which received 47.5% of the vote. The next three most popular parties were the BDP Party (19.4%), the EDU Party (7.2%) and the Green Party (6.5%). In the federal election, a total of 183 votes were cast, and the voter turnout was 46.6%.

== Economy ==
As of 2011, Auswil had an unemployment rate of 1.13%. As of 2008, there were a total of 157 people employed in the municipality. Of these, there were 86 people employed in the primary economic sector and about 33 businesses involved in this sector. 15 people were employed in the secondary sector and there were 4 businesses in this sector. 56 people were employed in the tertiary sector, with 12 businesses in this sector.

In 2008 there were a total of 111 full-time equivalent jobs. The number of jobs in the primary sector was 51, all of which were in agriculture. The number of jobs in the secondary sector was 12 of which 3 or (25.0%) were in manufacturing and 9 (75.0%) were in construction. The number of jobs in the tertiary sector was 48. In the tertiary sector; 36 or 75.0% were in wholesale or retail sales or the repair of motor vehicles, 1 was in a hotel or restaurant, 3 or 6.3% were the insurance or financial industry, 4 or 8.3% were in education and 1 was in health care.

In 2000, there were 34 workers who commuted into the municipality and 168 workers who commuted away. The municipality is a net exporter of workers, with about 4.9 workers leaving the municipality for every one entering. Of the working population, 6.8% used public transportation to get to work, and 54.7% used a private car.

== Religion ==
From the 2000 census, 36 or 7.1% were Roman Catholic, while 424 or 84.0% belonged to the Swiss Reformed Church. Of the rest of the population, there were 32 individuals (or about 6.34% of the population) who belonged to another Christian church. 12 (or about 2.38% of the population) belonged to no church, are agnostic or atheist, and 17 individuals (or about 3.37% of the population) did not answer the question.

== Education ==
In Auswil about 203 or (40.2%) of the population have completed non-mandatory upper secondary education, and 40 or (7.9%) have completed additional higher education (either university or a Fachhochschule). Of the 40 who completed tertiary schooling, 57.5% were Swiss men, 30.0% were Swiss women.

The Canton of Bern school system provides one year of non-obligatory Kindergarten, followed by six years of Primary school. This is followed by three years of obligatory lower Secondary school where the students are separated according to ability and aptitude. Following the lower Secondary students may attend additional schooling or they may enter an apprenticeship.

During the 2009-10 school year, there were a total of 13 students attending classes in Auswil. There were no kindergarten classes in the municipality. The municipality had one primary class and 13 students.

As of 2000, there were 5 students in Auswil who came from another municipality, while 30 residents attended schools outside the municipality.
