= Fritz Morgenthaler =

Fritz Morgenthaler (Swiss Standard German: [ˈmɔrɡəntaːlər]; July 19, 1919 – October 26, 1984) was a Swiss psychoanalyst, physician, and painter. Morgenthaler was, along with George Devereux, one of the founders of ethnopsychoanalysis.

== Life ==
Fritz Morgenthaler was born in Oberhofen am Thunersee. He was the son of the Swiss painter Ernst Morgenthaler and his wife Sasha Morgenthaler. He studied medicine at the University of Zurich and got his degree in 1945. His doctoral thesis, Untersuchungen über die Phänomenologie des Fussohlenreflexes beim Gesunde, was published in 1948. While he was working at a neurological hospital in Zurich he trained as a psychoanalyst with Rudolf Brunn. Together with his wife Ruth, and Paul Parin and his wife Goldy Parin-Matthèy he undertook expeditions to West Africa and they developed the concept of ethnopsychoanalysis.

He died in Addis Abeba.

== Works ==
- (with Paul Parin and Goldy Parin-Matthèy) Die Weissen denken zuviel : psychoanalytische Untersuchungen bei den Dogon in Westafrika, Zürich: Atlantis, 1963.
- Technik : zur Dialektik der psychoanalytischen Praxis, 1978
- (with Paul Parin and Goldy Parin-Matthèy) Fear thy neighbor as thyself: psychoanalysis and society among the Anyi of West Africa. Translated by Patricia Klamerth. Chicago: Chicago University Press, 1980.
- (with Florence Weiss and Marco Morgenthaler) Gespräche am sterbenden Fluss : Ethnopsychoanalyse bei den Iatmul in Papua Neuguinea, 1984.
- (with Paul Parin et al.) Der Traum : Fragmente zur Theorie und Technik der Traumdeutung, 1986
- Homosexuality, heterosexuality, perversion, Hillsdale, NJ : Analytic Press: Distributed by Lawrence Erlbaum, 1988. With an introduction by Werner Muensterberger. Translated from the German by Andreas Aebi. Edited by Paul Moor.
