= Kleindietwil =

- Former municipality
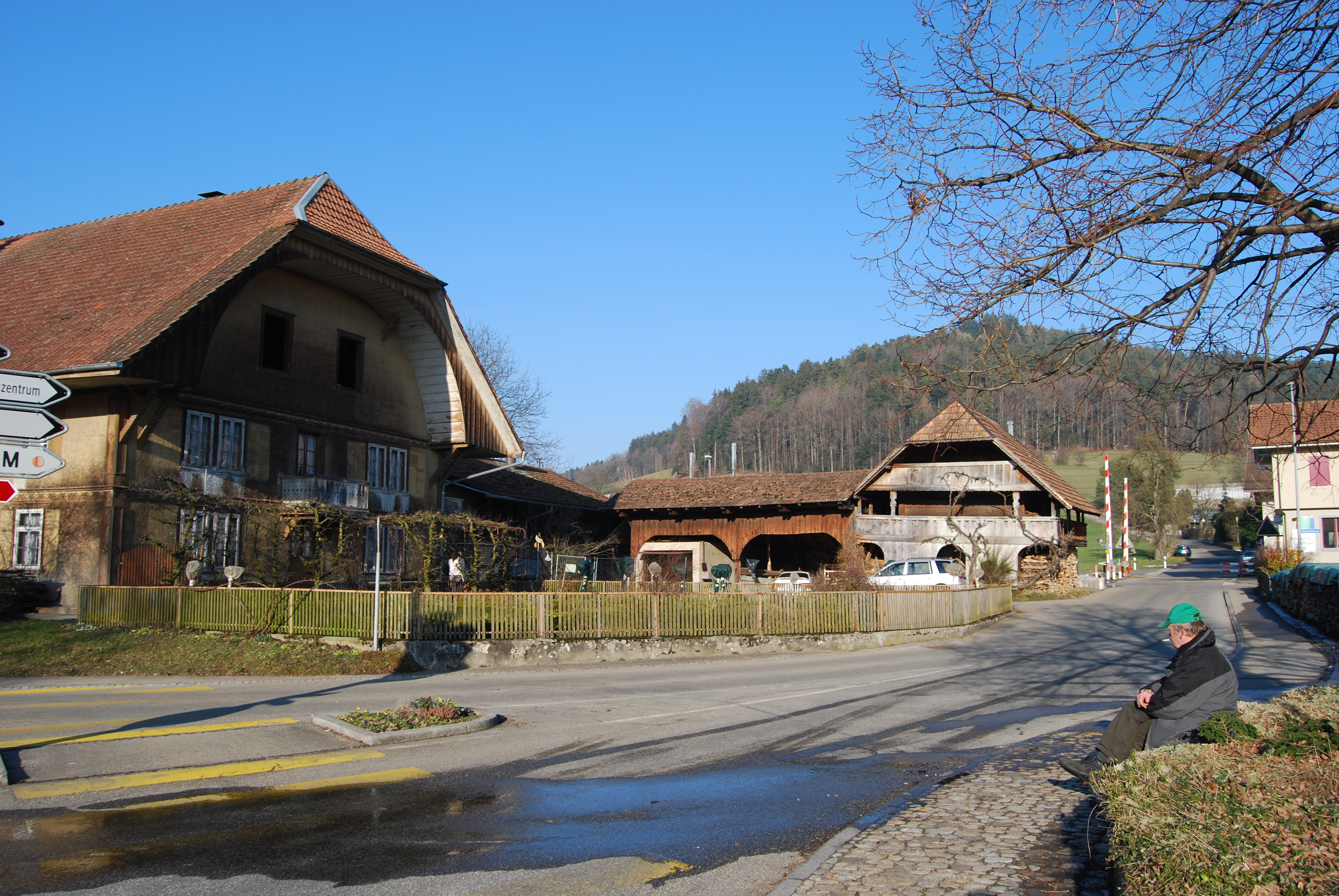

- Flag Coat of arms
- Location of Kleindietwil
- Location within Switzerland Location within Canton of Bern
- Coordinates: 47°9′N 7°48′E
- Country: Switzerland
- Canton: Bern
- District: Oberaargau

Area
  - Total: 2.7 km^{2} (1.0 sq mi)
- Elevation: 557 m (1,827 ft)

Population (31 December 2010)
  - Total: 495
  - Density: 180/km^{2} (470/sq mi)
- Time zone: UTC+01:00 (CET)
  - Summer (DST): UTC+02:00 (CEST)
- Postal code: 4936
- SFOS number: 328
- ISO 3166 code: CH-BE
- Surrounded by: Auswil, Leimiswil, Madiswil, Rohrbach, Rohrbachgraben, Ursenbach
- Website: SFSO statistics

Kleindietwil is a former municipality in the Oberaargau administrative district in the canton of Bern in Switzerland. On 1 January 2011 Kleindietwil and Leimiswil were merged with the municipality of Madiswil.

== Geography ==
Before merging with Madiswil in 2011, Kleindietwil had an area of 2.68 km^{2} (1.03 sq mi). Of this area, 1.59 km^{2} (0.61 sq mi) was used for agricultural purposes, while 0.79 km^{2} (0.31 sq mi) is forested. Of the rest of the land, 0.28 km^{2} (0.11 sq mi) was developed, 0.02 km^{2} (4.9 acres) were rivers or lakes, and 0.02 km^{2} (4.9 acres) was unproductive land.

Of the developed land, industrial buildings made up 1.1% of the total area while housing and buildings made up 5.2% and transportation infrastructure made up 3.4%. 28.4% of the total land area is heavily forested and 1.1% is covered with orchards or small clusters of trees. Of the agricultural land, 26.1% is used for growing crops and 30.2% is pastures, while 3.0% is used for orchards or vine crops. All the water in the municipality is in rivers and streams.

== Demographics ==
As of 31 December 2010, Kleindietwil has a population of 495. As of 2007, 0.8% of the population was made up of foreign nationals. Over the last 10 years the population has decreased at a rate of -10.3%. As of 2000, most of the population speaks German (95.3%), as well as Albanian (2.4%) and French (0.6%).

In the 2007 election, the most popular party was the SVP which received 39.2% of the vote. The next three most popular parties were the SPS (18.1%), the Green Party (12.5%) and the FDP (10.5%).

The age distribution of the population (as of 2000) is children and teenagers (0–19 years old) made up 28.5% of the population, while adults (20–64 years old) make up 54.9% and the seniors (over 64 years old) make up 16.6%. The entire Swiss population is generally well educated. In Kleindietwil about 78.5% of the population (between age 25-64) have completed either non-mandatory upper secondary education or additional higher education (either University or a Fachhochschule).

Kleindietwil has an unemployment rate of 0.75%. As of 2005, there were 38 people employed in the primary economic sector and about 12 businesses involved in this sector. 29 people are employed in the secondary sector and there are 10 businesses in this sector. 126 people are employed in the tertiary sector, with 19 businesses in this sector.
