= Madiswil =

- Municipality
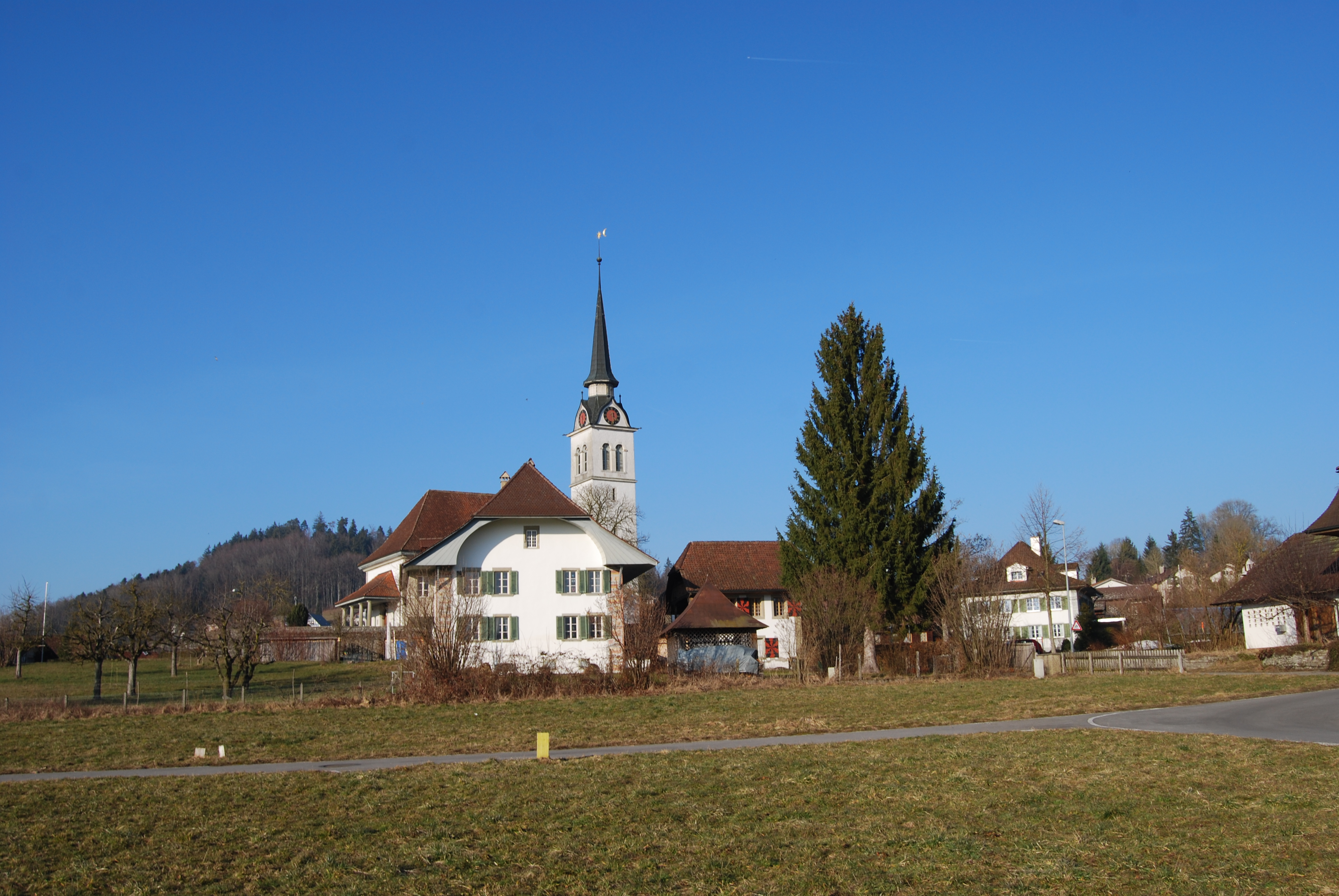

- Flag Coat of arms
- Location of Madiswil
- Location within Switzerland Location within Canton of Bern
- Coordinates: 47°10′N 7°48′E
- Country: Switzerland
- Canton: Bern
- District: Oberaargau

Area
  - Total: 23.19 km^{2} (8.95 sq mi)
- Elevation: 538 m (1,765 ft)

Population (December 2020)
  - Total: 3,284
  - Density: 141.6/km^{2} (366.8/sq mi)
- Time zone: UTC+01:00 (CET)
  - Summer (DST): UTC+02:00 (CEST)
- Postal code: 4934
- SFOS number: 332
- ISO 3166 code: CH-BE
- Surrounded by: Auswil, Busswil bei Melchnau, Gondiswil, Gutenburg, Kleindietwil, Leimiswil, Lotzwil, Melchnau, Reisiswil, Rütschelen
- Website: www.madiswil.ch

Madiswil is a municipality in the Oberaargau administrative district in the canton of Bern in Switzerland. Since January 1, 2007, Gutenburg is part of the municipality. On 1 January 2011 Kleindietwil and Leimiswil were merged with the municipality of Madiswil.

== History ==
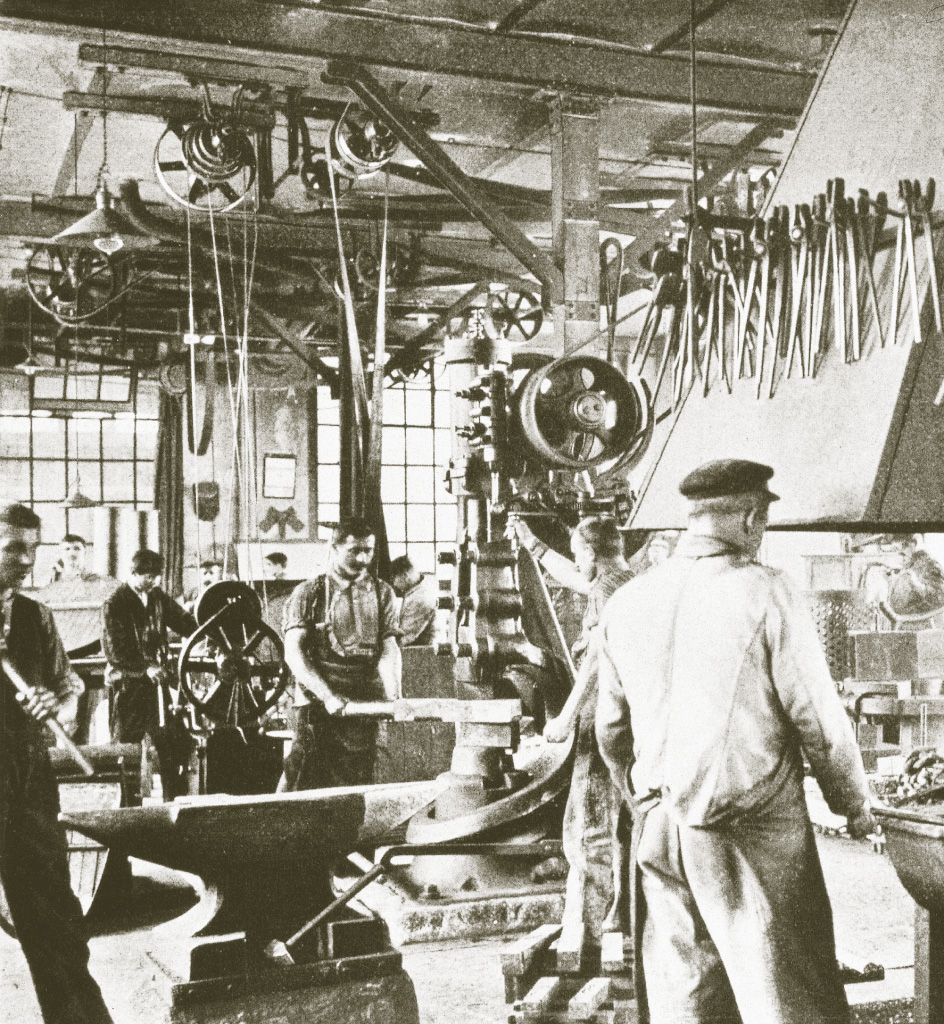
The first factory of the Ammanns group in Madiswil, founded in 1869

Aerial view (1970)

Madiswil is first mentioned in 795 as Madalestwilare.

The ruins of Early Medieval ring fort at Weiherköpfli, an undated ring fort at Fuchsmatt and an undated fort at Grauenstein are the earliest evidence of settlements in Madiswil. In 795 Heribold gave his land and rights in Madiwil to the church in Rohrbach. Several other religious houses had land or rights in the village including; the Abbey of St. Gall (795), St. Johannsen Abbey (1185) and St. Urban's Abbey (1194). In 1333 the Counts of Kyburg pledged their low court right to the Lords of Grünenberg, though they retained the high court. In 1406, the increasingly impoverished Counts of Kyburg gave the high court rights to Bern. During the Old Zürich War, the Lords of Grünenberg remained loyal to Frederick III of Habsburg who was an ally of Zürich against the rest of the Swiss Confederation. In 1443-44 Bern marched the Lords of Grünenberg and occupied Madiswil. As part of the settlement after the war, in 1447 Bern acquired partial rights over the village and surrounding land. In 1480, they bought out the rights of the remaining Grünenberg and incorporated it into the bailiwick of Aarwangen. During the 16th century the village had a series of conflicts with St. Urban's Abbey over ownership and use rights to several boggy meadows near the Langeten river. After the 1798 French invasion and the creation of the Helvetic Republic, Madiswil, without Leimiswil, became part of the Langenthal District. After the Act of Mediation in 1803, it was transferred to the Aarwangen District.

The village church of St. Blasius was first mentioned in 1275, though it was built above several older churches. The oldest is from the 8th century and may have been built on wooden piles driven into the ground. The current church was built in 1779.

Starting in the 19th century, the farms in the village switched from growing grain to livestock and dairy farming. A dairyman's cooperative and three cheese factories opened. In 1869, the Ammann Mühlebau-Werkstätte opened in Madiswil. This was the first factory of what became the Ammann company, which is now a large multinational with 2,900 employees that builds construction equipment. The company is now headquartered in nearby Langenthal. In 1889, the Langenthal-Huttwil-Wolhusen railway built a station in Madiswil, which made it easy for commuters to work in nearby Langenthal. In the 1960s several new housing estates were built on the outskirts of the village. At the beginning of the 21st century the main village has become a commercial and industrial center for the surrounding rural hamlets.

A new school building opened in Madiswil in 1984 and the old satellite school houses in Wyssbach and Mättenbach were abandoned.

== Geography ==
Madiswil has an area of 23.17 km^{2} (8.95 sq mi). Of this area, 9.45 km^{2} (3.65 mi^{2}) or 59.6% is used for agricultural purposes, while 5.24 km^{2} (2.02 mi^{2}) or 33.1% is forested. Of the rest of the land, 1.11 km^{2} (0.43 mi^{2}) or 7.0% is settled (buildings or roads), 0.02 km^{2} (4.9 acres) or 0.1% is either rivers or lakes and 0.01 km^{2} (2.5 acres) or 0.1% is unproductive land.

Of the built up area, housing and buildings made up 4.0% and transportation infrastructure made up 2.1%. Out of the forested land, 31.2% of the total land area is heavily forested and 1.8% is covered with orchards or small clusters of trees. Of the agricultural land, 28.8% is used for growing crops and 28.5% is pastures, while 2.3% is used for orchards or vine crops. All the water in the municipality is flowing water.

The municipality is located in the Langeten valley. It consists of the village of Madiswil and the hamlets of Mättenbach and Wyssbach and the former municipalities of Gutenburg, Kleindietwil and Leimiswil.

On 31 December 2009 Amtsbezirk Aarwangen, the municipality's former district, was dissolved. This was followed by the municipality joining Verwaltungskreis Oberaargau on 1 January 2010.

== Coat of arms ==
The blazon of the municipal coat of arms is Vert a Peasant dressed Argent mowing with a sickle handled Or and bladed of the second.

== Demographics ==
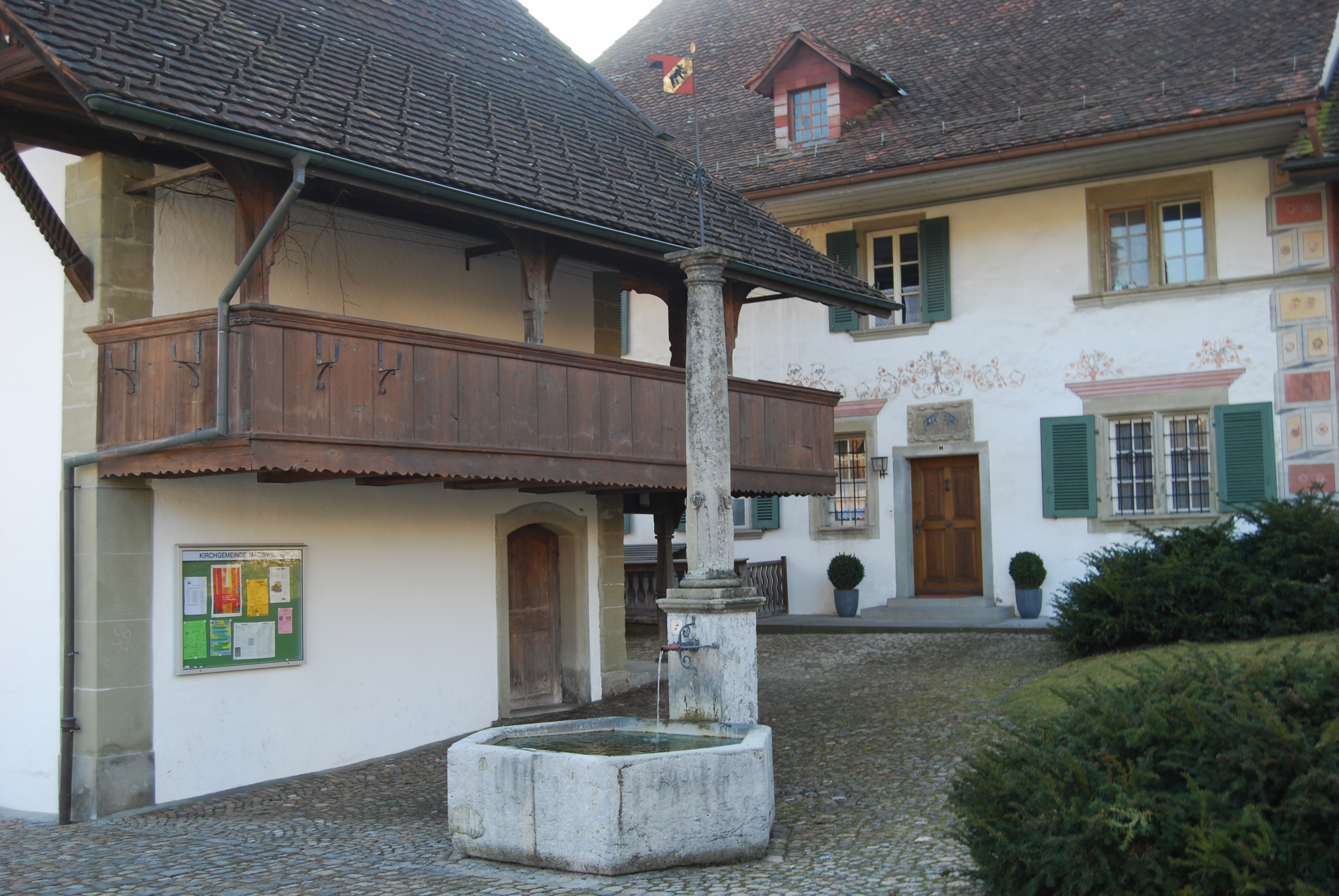
Part of the old village center of Madiswil

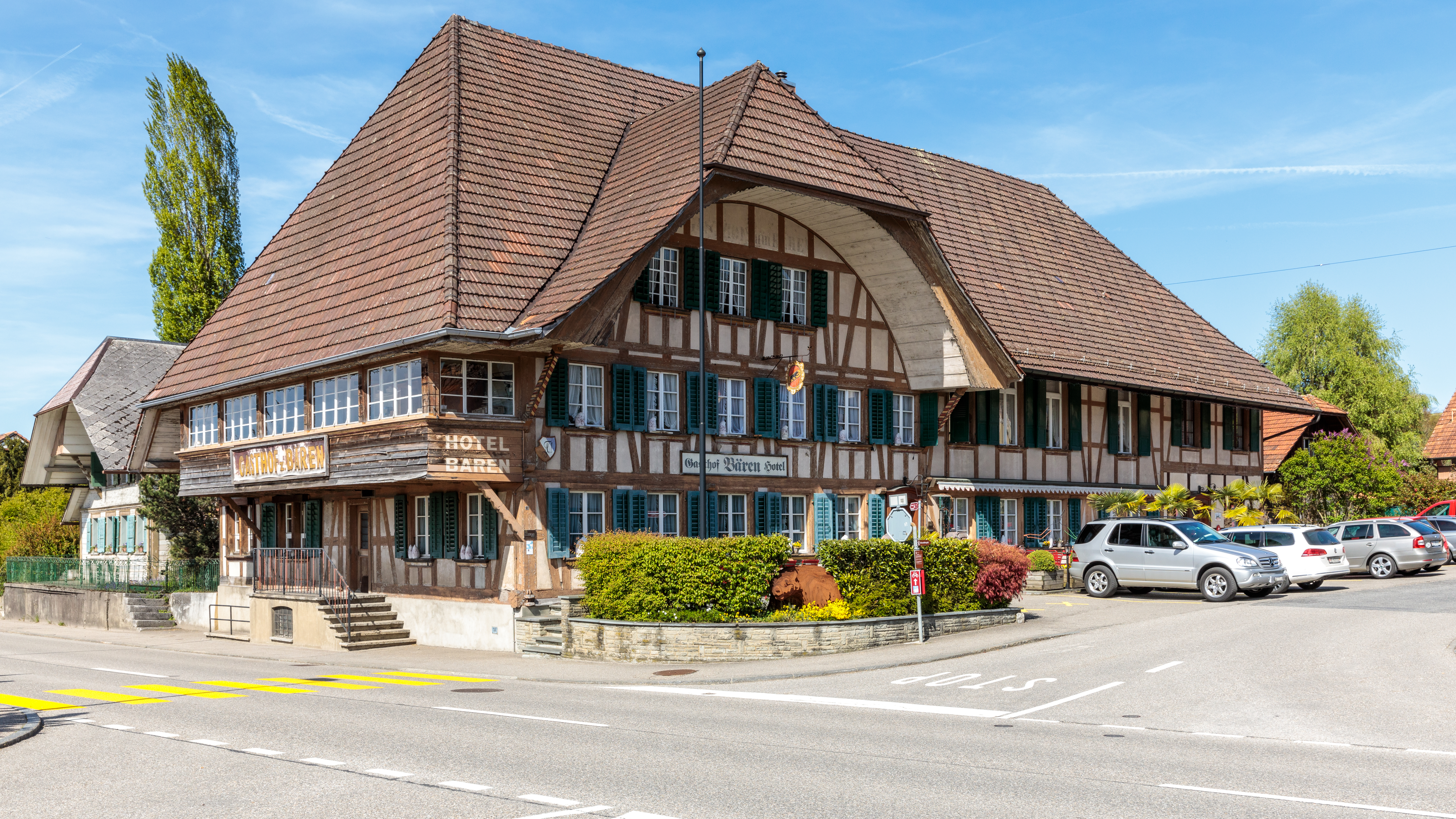
Baeren Inn

Madiswil has a population (as of December 2020) of 3,284. As of 2010, 5.1% of the population are resident foreign nationals. Over the last 10 years (2000-2010) the population has changed at a rate of -1.6%. Migration accounted for -0.7%, while births and deaths accounted for -0.5%.

Most of the population (as of 2000) speaks German (1,956 or 97.1%) as their first language, Albanian is the second most common (13 or 0.6%) and Russian is the third (5 or 0.2%). There are 4 people who speak French, 4 people who speak Italian.

As of 2008, the population was 49.5% male and 50.5% female. The population was made up of 1,025 Swiss men (46.3% of the population) and 73 (3.3%) non-Swiss men. There were 1,078 Swiss women (48.6%) and 40 (1.8%) non-Swiss women. Of the population in the municipality, 755 or about 37.5% were born in Madiswil and lived there in 2000. There were 769 or 38.2% who were born in the same canton, while 296 or 14.7% were born somewhere else in Switzerland, and 126 or 6.3% were born outside of Switzerland.

As of 2010, children and teenagers (0–19 years old) make up 21.9% of the population, while adults (20–64 years old) make up 59.5% and seniors (over 64 years old) make up 18.5%.

As of 2000, there were 831 people who were single and never married in the municipality. There were 1,012 married individuals, 113 widows or widowers and 59 individuals who are divorced.

As of 2000, there were 233 households that consist of only one person and 64 households with five or more people. In 2000, a total of 774 apartments (91.5% of the total) were permanently occupied, while 48 apartments (5.7%) were seasonally occupied and 24 apartments (2.8%) were empty. As of 2010, the construction rate of new housing units was 0.6 new units per 1000 residents. The vacancy rate for the municipality, in 2011, was 0.54%.

The historical population is given in the following chart:

== Politics ==
In the 2011 federal election the most popular party was the SVP which received 39.3% of the vote. The next three most popular parties were the BDP Party (16.7%), the SPS (10.9%) and the FDP (6.9%). In the federal election, a total of 1,288 votes were cast, and the voter turnout was 52.8%.

== Economy ==
As of 2011, Madiswil had an unemployment rate of 1.15%. As of 2008, there were a total of 1,250 people employed in the municipality. Of these, there were 299 people employed in the primary economic sector and about 112 businesses involved in this sector. 337 people were employed in the secondary sector and there were 50 businesses in this sector. 614 people were employed in the tertiary sector, with 89 businesses in this sector.

In 2008 there were a total of 639 full-time equivalent jobs. The number of jobs in the primary sector was 112, of which 111 were in agriculture and 1 was in forestry or lumber production. The number of jobs in the secondary sector was 179 of which 114 or (63.7%) were in manufacturing and 65 (36.3%) were in construction. The number of jobs in the tertiary sector was 348. In the tertiary sector; 81 or 23.3% were in wholesale or retail sales or the repair of motor vehicles, 16 or 4.6% were in the movement and storage of goods, 47 or 13.5% were in a hotel or restaurant, 2 or 0.6% were in the information industry, 6 or 1.7% were the insurance or financial industry, 15 or 4.3% were technical professionals or scientists, 17 or 4.9% were in education and 140 or 40.2% were in health care.

In 2000, there were 332 workers who commuted into the municipality and 650 workers who commuted away. The municipality is a net exporter of workers, with about 2.0 workers leaving the municipality for every one entering. Of the working population, 10.5% used public transportation to get to work, and 54.8% used a private car.

== Religion ==
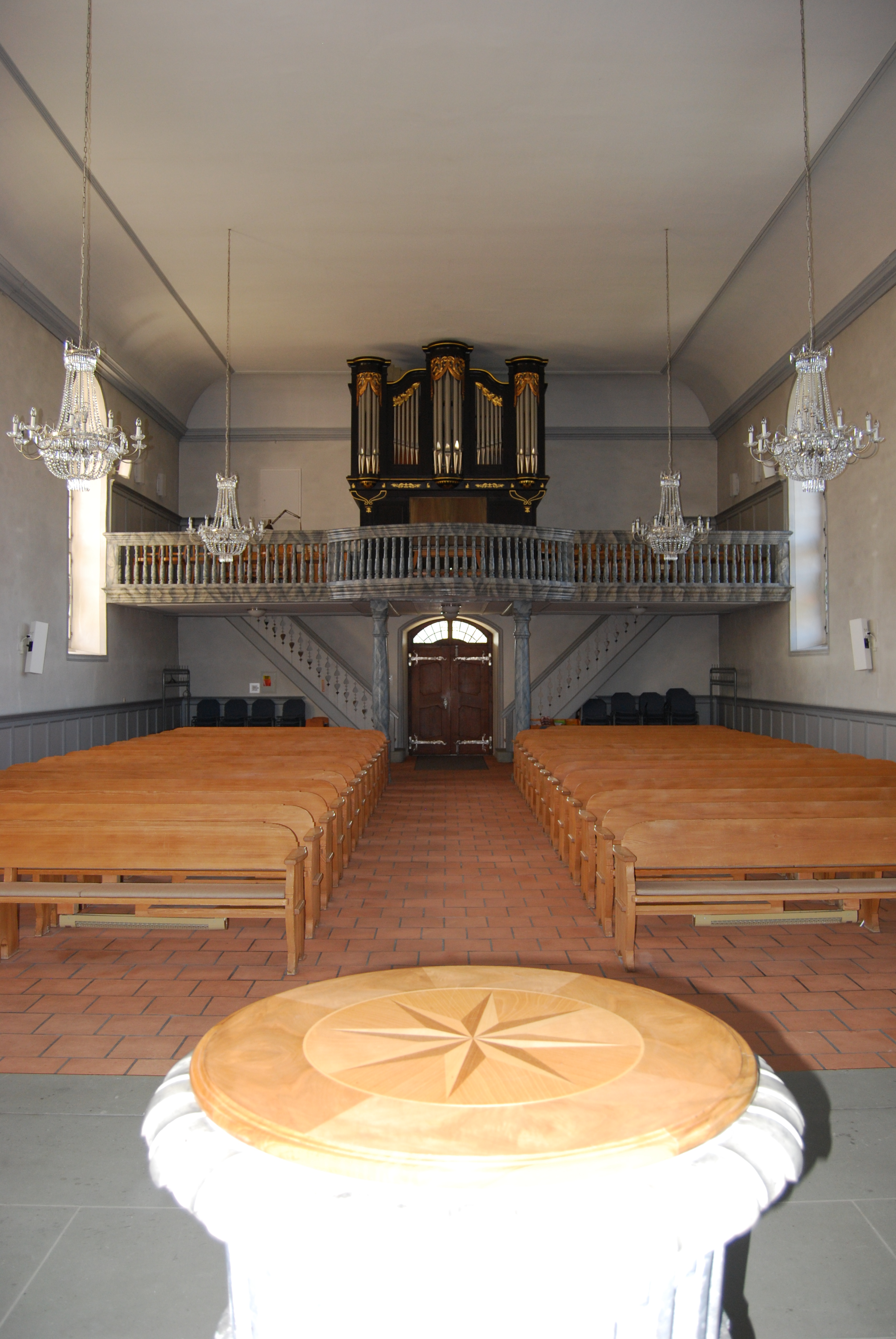
Interior of the Reformed church of Madiswil

From the 2000 census, 128 or 6.4% were Roman Catholic, while 1,605 or 79.7% belonged to the Swiss Reformed Church. Of the rest of the population, there were 9 members of an Orthodox church (or about 0.45% of the population), there was 1 individual who belongs to the Christian Catholic Church, and there were 186 individuals (or about 9.23% of the population) who belonged to another Christian church. There were 21 (or about 1.04% of the population) who were Islamic. There were 4 individuals who were Buddhist and 4 individuals who were Hindu. 88 (or about 4.37% of the population) belonged to no church, are agnostic or atheist, and 61 individuals (or about 3.03% of the population) did not answer the question.

== Weather ==
Madiswil has an average of 134.7 days of rain or snow per year and on average receives 1,150 mm (45 in) of precipitation. The wettest month is June during which time Madiswil receives an average of 128 mm (5.0 in) of rain or snow. During this month there is precipitation for an average of 12.6 days. The month with the most days of precipitation is May, with an average of 13.3, but with only 106 mm (4.2 in) of rain or snow. The driest month of the year is October with an average of 76 mm (3.0 in) of precipitation over 8.3 days.

== Education ==
In Madiswil about 825 or (40.9%) of the population have completed non-mandatory upper secondary education, and 227 or (11.3%) have completed additional higher education (either university or a Fachhochschule). Of the 227 who completed tertiary schooling, 73.1% were Swiss men, 20.3% were Swiss women, 4.4% were non-Swiss men and 2.2% were non-Swiss women.

The Canton of Bern school system provides one year of non-obligatory Kindergarten, followed by six years of Primary school. This is followed by three years of obligatory lower Secondary school where the students are separated according to ability and aptitude. Following the lower Secondary students may attend additional schooling or they may enter an apprenticeship.

During the 2009-10 school year, there were a total of 243 students attending classes in Madiswil. There were 2 kindergarten classes with a total of 48 students in the municipality. Of the kindergarten students, and 8.3% have a different mother language than the classroom language. The municipality had 8 primary classes and 159 students. Of the primary students, and 3.8% have a different mother language than the classroom language. During the same year, there were 2 lower secondary classes with a total of 36 students.

As of 2000, there were 2 students in Madiswil who came from another municipality, while 72 residents attended schools outside the municipality.

Madiswil is home to the Schul- und Gemeindebibliothek Madiswil (municipal library of Madiswil). The library has (as of 2008) 4,000 books or other media, and loaned out 12,000 items in the same year. It was open a total of 128 days with average of 4 hours per week during that year.
