= Morgentaler =

Morgentaler is a family name (or surname) of Jewish families from Poland.

== Origin ==
The family name Morgentaler developed among Ashkenazi Jews in Europe.

== Distribution ==
Until World War II in Poland, mainly in Łódź. The Central Database of Shoah Victims' Names enlists many Jewish Morgentaler victims of the Holocaust. Few Polish Morgentalers survived and emigrated. Today's spreading is relatively high in Canada and Serbia.

== People ==
- Henry Morgentaler (1923–2013, Łódź), Canadian physician and abortion activist
  - Morgentaler v The Queen, 1976 Supreme Court of Canada decision
  - R. v. Morgentaler (1988), Supreme Court of Canada decision
  - R. v. Morgentaler (1993), Supreme Court of Canada decision
- Goldie Morgentaler (born 1950), Yiddish author

== See also ==
- Morgenthaler (name)
