= George William Morgenthaler =

American mathematician

George William Morgenthaler is an American mathematician at the University of Colorado at Boulder working on analysis.
