= Sasha Morgenthaler =

Swiss artist and dollmaker (1893–1975)

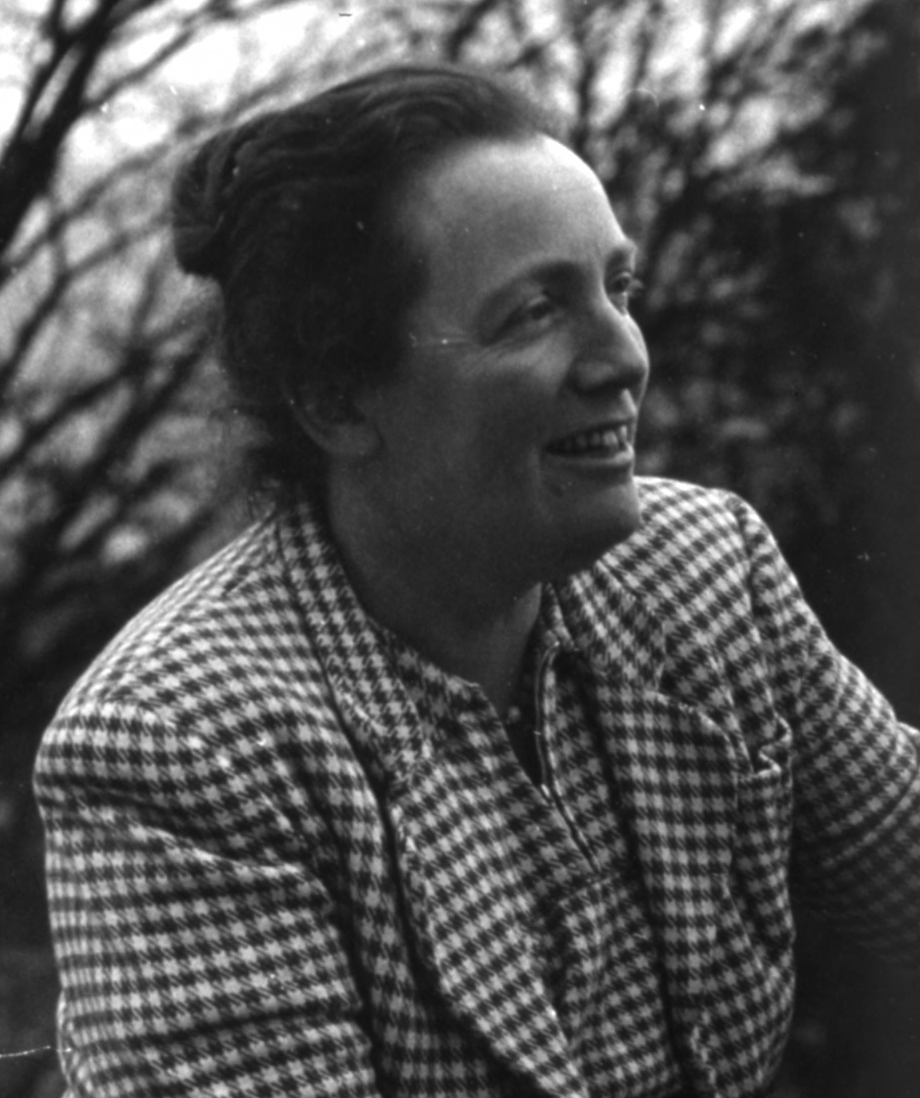
Sasha Morgenthaler (ca. 1950)

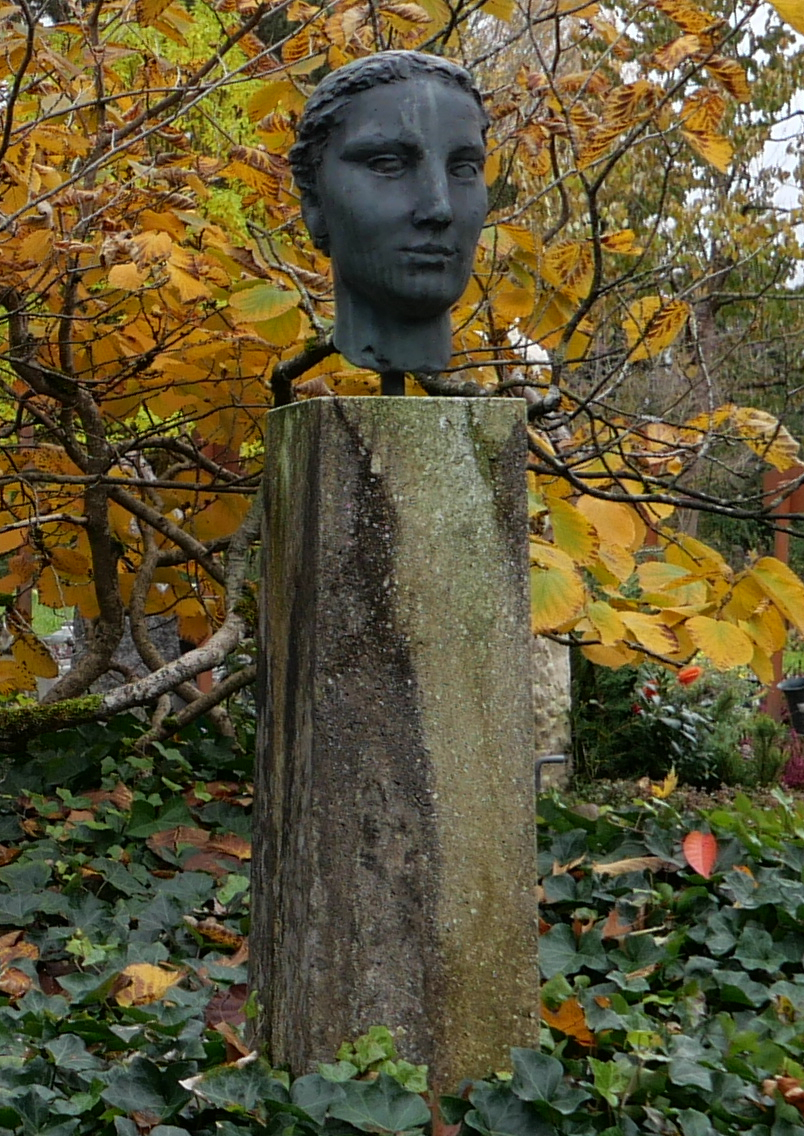
Bust of Morgenthaler, produced by her friend, the sculptor Karl Geiser, from her grave at the cemetery of Hönggerberg in Zurich.

Sasha Morgenthaler (1893–1975) was a Swiss artist and dollmaker, best known for the "Sasha doll" produced in Germany and the United Kingdom beginning in the late 1960s. Popular with collectors, Sasha dolls are characterized by their individualism, their realistic expressions, their unique color, and the extreme attention to detail in the manufacture of the dolls as well as their clothes. Morgenthaler created face sculpts for her dolls with subtle expressions, not artificially exaggerated smiles to appeal to children regardless of their mood or circumstances.

== Background ==
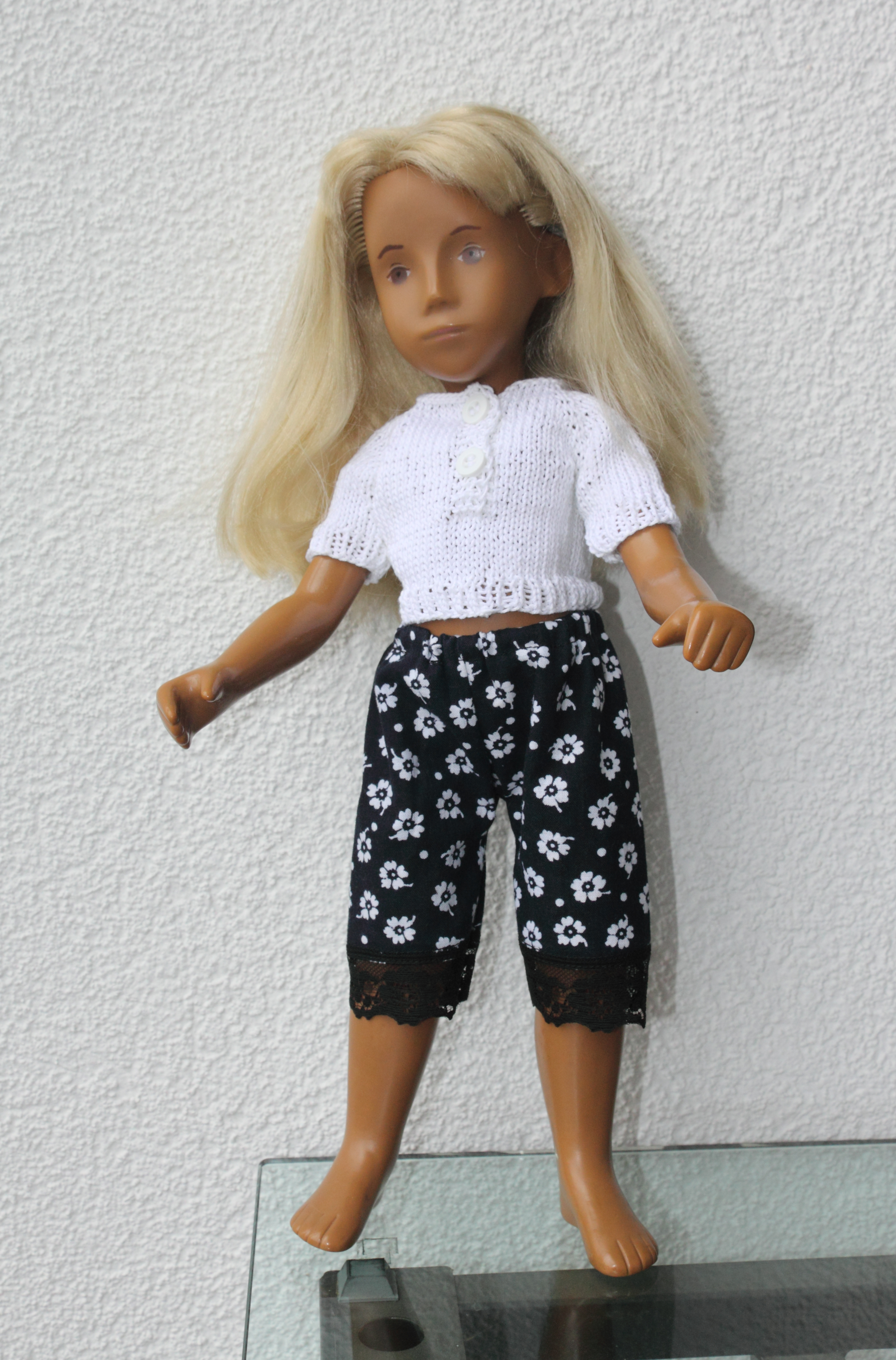
Sasha doll, designed by Sasha Morgenthaler. Goetz, "No Navel" series, around 1970.

Sasha Morgenthaler was an artist working most often in sculpture and paint; her early life was enriched by visits to the von Sinner family home from great artists such as Paul Klee, who supervised her artistic education and introduced Morgenthaler to members of the Der Blaue Reiter such as Wassily Kandinsky. Paul Klee orchestrated Morgenthaler's entry to the School of Fine Arts at Geneva. Morgenthaler married fellow artist Ernst Morgenthaler.

== Sasha dolls ==
Morgenthaler decided in the 1960s to mass-produce dolls at reasonable prices after years of making dolls herself for the studio, on commission, and for private individuals. Two companies were licensed to produce the dolls: Götz in Germany and Frido (later Trendon) in the UK. Production in Germany ran from 1965 to 1969 and from 1995 to 2001, while the UK production ran from 1966 to 1986.

Dolls were produced in different styles, wearing different clothes, and with subtle variations (mostly in painting) that individualize and particularize each. Asymmetrical and made of hard vinyl with elastic stringing enabling them to take poses, Sasha dolls are characterized by a serious, open expression that seems to make them more adaptable to imaginative play than if they were forever smiling.

It was said by art historian Juliette Peers that: "Sasha dolls are renowned for possessing a solid intellectuality." Morgenthaler created face sculpts for her dolls with subtle expressions, not artificially exaggerated smiles: her concern was that children surviving the horrors of WWII would not relate to such happy dolls in times of terror. It was said of Morgenthaler herself, as a child, that "When she was sad, she did not like her dolls uncompromising smiles. Once she grabbed a nail file and scraped off her doll's false grin..." In her own words, "No grotesque caricature can awaken a child's true feelings. A piece of wood, barely carved, is far superior to a conventional doll with an exaggerated smile."

Morgenthaler's original idea was for the dolls to represent an image of universal childhood, so from the beginning of mass-production, the vinyl was coffee-coloured so that they would not appear to belong to any one ethnic group. In the early 1970s, black dolls were introduced, first in an extremely dark complexion, then in a lighter complexion in the latter part of the decade. Around 1980, the "skin" tone of most of the "Caucasian" dolls was lightened.

Dolls come in girl, boy, baby, and (beginning in the last production cycle) toddler versions. Girl and boy dolls are 16 inches or so tall, while babies and toddlers are 11–12 inches. Babies have curved arms and legs and do not stand. When first introduced, baby dolls were sexed with stylised genitals, but the practice was discontinued. Dolls have rooted hair in brown, blonde, red, or black, though some "limited edition" dolls had wigs. Clothes sets were available, though some clothes came only with the purchase of a doll and were not available separately.

=== Gregor and Cora Dolls ===
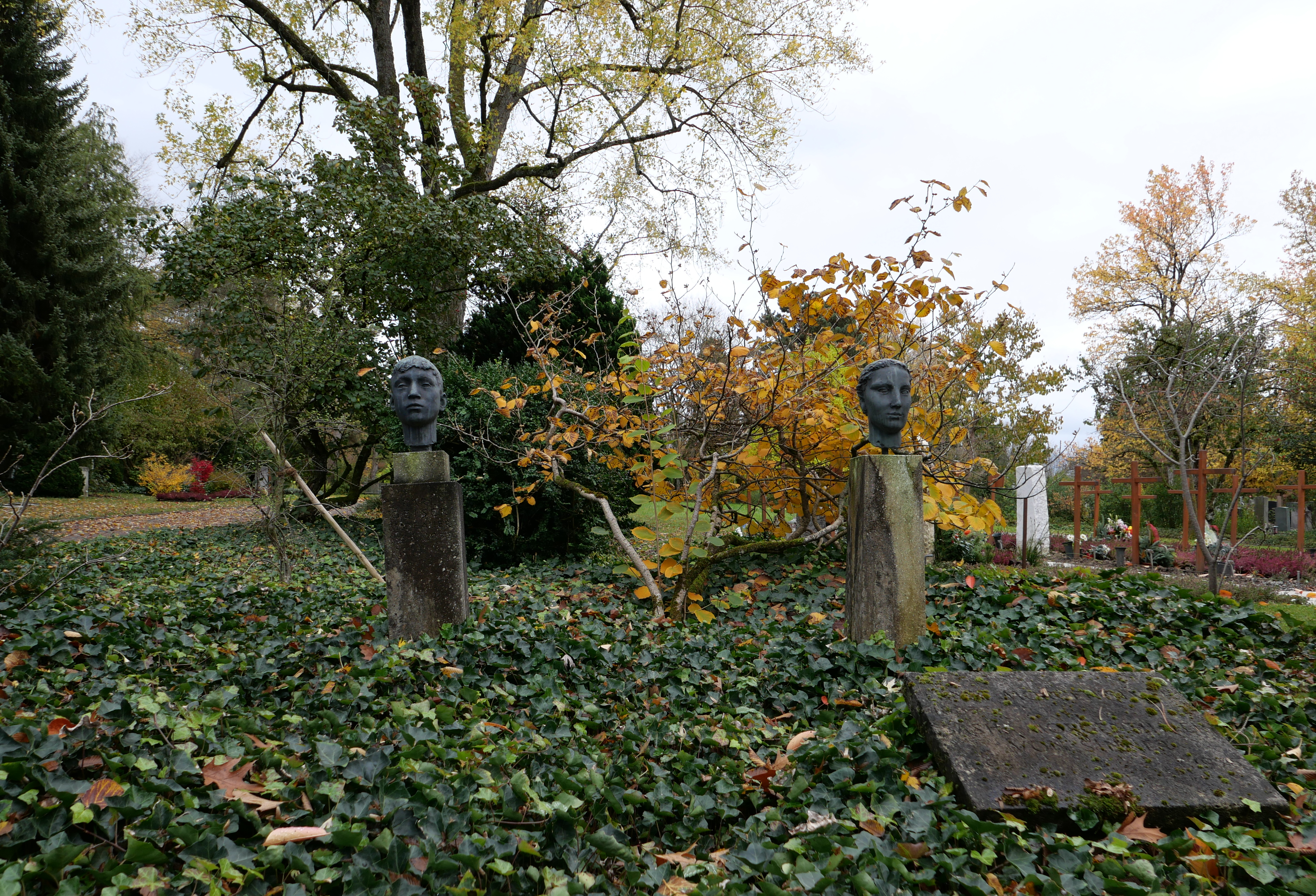
The tombstone with Morgenthaler's bust (right) and the grave slab from her now dissolved grave that she shared with her husband at the cemetery of Hönggerberg in Zurich. On the left is the tombstone of Karl Geiser with his bust.

The generic name for the dolls is "Sasha" after their creator. Some dolls have their own names, however. During the 1960s, 1970s, and 1980s, "Caucasian" boy dolls were known as "Gregor", black girl dolls were known as "Cora", and black boy dolls were known as "Caleb". When production resumed in 1995, many of the dolls were given individual names by the manufacturer, but all are still identified by the collective name of "Sasha".

=== Collectibles ===
Now that production has ceased, the dolls are becoming more and more collectible. The rarest ones can fetch high prices on auction sites such as eBay and from individual dealers. Various generations of Morgenthaler's Sasha dolls are available for viewing at the Puppenmuseum Sasha Morgenthaler in Switzerland. Here visitors may also view related archival holdings and other works of art by Morgenthaler.
