= Swissa =

Typewriter brand

Swissa was a popular typewriter brand of the post-war era. The Swissa was made by the company Birchmeier's Söhne in Murgenthal (Aargau) and was based on the technical developments of the Patria typewriters. The Swissa Typewriters received much attention due to their product design.

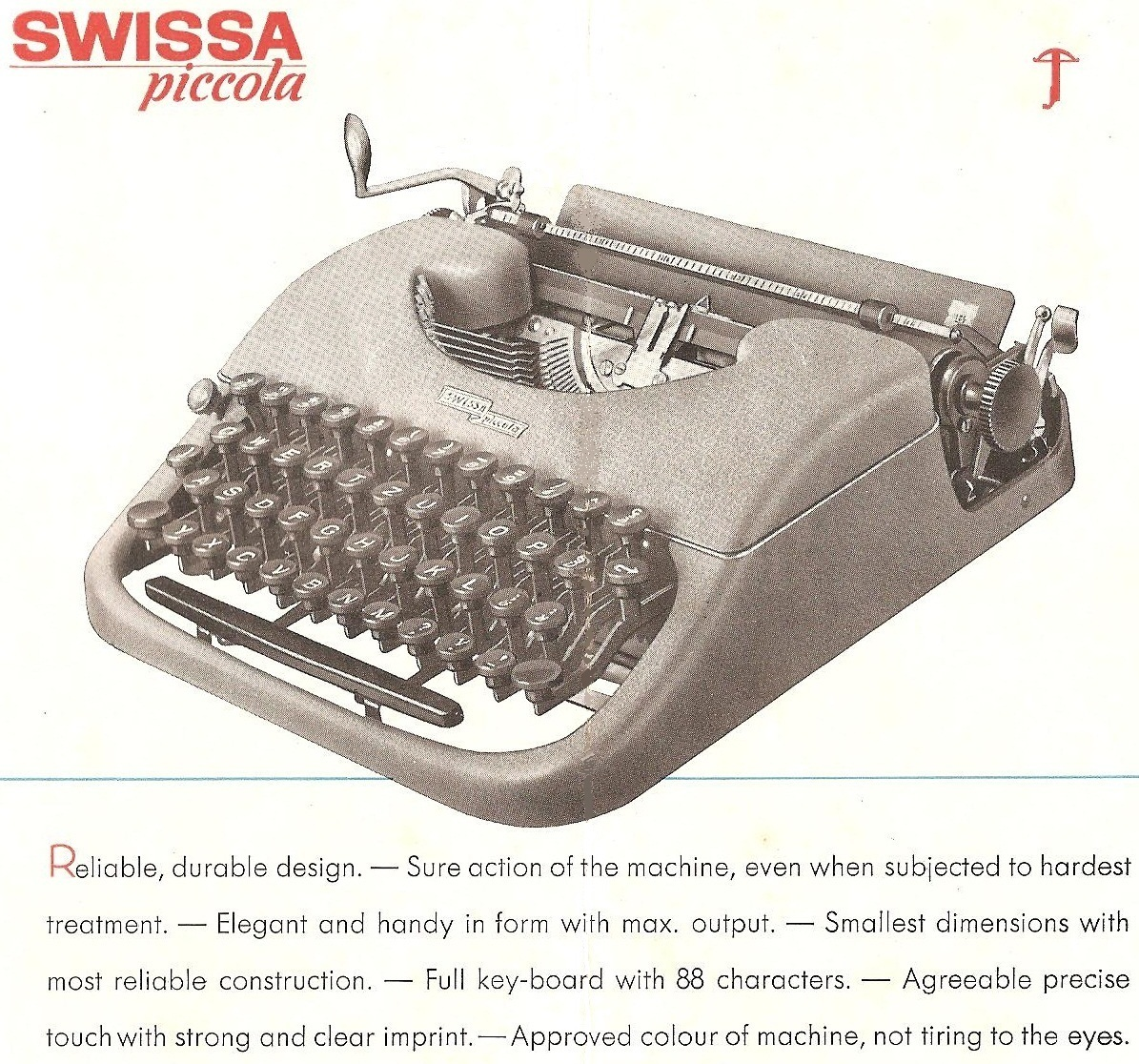
Swissa Frontseite manual 03

== History and technical developments ==
=== Beginnings ===
Swissa's predecessor - the Patria - was invented by Otto Haas and produced in Switzerland beginning in 1936. The Company Patria started as a ski and ski poles manufacturer in 1908. It branched out into producing typewriters in 1936 initially at its factory in Büttenbergweg 5, Pierterlen, Switzerland (the factory building is still standing, as of May 2018). The first typewriter was a portable typewriter designed by Carl Winterling (of the Archo typewriter Company) based on the idea of engineer Otto Haas.

=== Technical developments ===
In 1933, Otto Haas filed a patent for the Patria Typewriter. In it, Otto Haas described his thoughts on his concept for a truly portable/compact typewriter. “In order to fully meet the requirements connected with the construction of an easily portable or travelling typewriter it is necessary to pay regard to the aforementioned conditions in a far greater measure than has heretofore been done in practice. For the purpose in view the dimensions of the typewriter and its parts must be kept so small, that it may conveniently be carried in a small travelling bag, and, accordingly, the weight of the typewriter must be quite considerably reduced, as compared with herefore constructed portable typewriters”.

=== Early production ===
In 1936 the Patria typewriter was shown at the Swiss tradeshow „Basler Mustermesse” In the same year, the production of the portable typewriter began in Pieterlen near Biel (Katon Bern). For this purpose the " A.G.für Schreibmaschinen-Fabrikation, Pieterlen, Schweiz” whose name translates to “Factory for Typewriters, Pieterlen, Switzerland” had been founded. Investors were the industrial families Chessex and Lutz.

The Engineer Otto Haas had settled in Teufenthal (Aargau) and brought his machine to production maturity together with Ch.Werner, Josef Brönner and Hermann Wasem.

In 1938/39 the corporation was dissolved, but seamlessly continued by the same family Lutz as "Patria-Schreibmaschinen GmbH" in Zurich. The first Patria typewriter was only produced for three years up to 1938 when it moved its factory from Pieterlen to Zurich. Hence, not many Patria typewriters were labelled "A.G. für Schreibmaschinen-Fabrikation - Pieterlen (Schweiz)" on the front of the typewriter - most are labelled "Patria Schreibmaschinen Gesellschaft (Zürich)" as the Zurich factory produced these typewriters up till 1943.

After 1943 the Patria was produced by August Birchmeier's sons, Murgenthal, Canton of Aargau, Switzerland. The first Patria models were known to be sturdy and solid and were even used by the Swiss Army.

In 1944, the architect, artist and designer Max Bill (1908-1994) was commissioned to redesign the Patria and designed an external form that became the archetype of the modern portable typewriter par excellence.

== Production of the Swissa ==
August Birchmeier's sons continued to manufacture after World War II and launched the machine in 1950 under the name “SWISSA”. The continuity is obvious: The "Patria" designed by Max Bill is identical to the "SWISSA" except for the brand name.

=== About the manufacturer ===
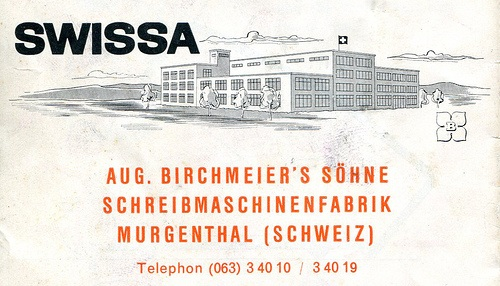
Swissa Frontseite manual 02

August Birchmeier's Sons (August Birchmeier's Söhne) was founded in 1908 by the eponymous founder as stamping tools factory August Birchmeier in Murgenthal, Canton of Aargau (from 1911 in the commercial register). In 1922 August Birchmeier died but his widow continued the workshop. In 1935 the sons took over the business: "August Birchmeier's sons" was founded. From 1931 to 1936 the company grew with the production of furniture fittings and locks. In the post-war years Birchmeier's began the production of a portable typewriters. 1952/52 August Birchmeier's sons set up a second plant in Wolfwil [Canton of Solothurn] (distance only 5 kilometers from Murgenthal).

In 1963 the toolmaking shop was relocated to the new factory. Around 1965 the typewriter SWISSA was produced in Murgenthal and furniture fittings and stamped products and other metal goods in Wolfwil.

The typewriter factory remained operational for 30 years until the late 1970s. On 31.5.1995 the company "August Birchmeier Sons" was deleted from the Swiss Commercial Register.

=== Swissa product lines ===
In 1950, the name changes from "Patria" to "Swissa Piccola". All other models of the "Birchmeier Patria" now run under the brand name Swissa. The following models were produced by August Birchmeier's Sons until 1980 when production ceased:

- Swissa piccola (from 1950 to 1958)
- Swissa junior (from 1958),
- Swissa jeunesse (until the 1970s)
- Swiss junior 4th (until the 1970s)
- "Helvetia" was an export variant of Swissa piccola.

== Patria family ==
The Swissa was sold all over Europe. However, a whole family of portable typewriters common throughout Europe had, as its base, the Patria of Switzerland. This machine's basic design was eventually produced via licensing agreements in England, France, Germany and Spain, that includes

- In France: Japy, Byron, Typo, Select and Patria

Japy acquires a license to manufacture the Swiss Patria typewriter. The result is the Japy, model P6, which was produced from 1937 to 1948. The P6 was mechanically a "Patria", but had its own design. From 1949 to 1959, the second design of the Patria typewriter, now SWISSA piccolo, which was designed by Max Bill, was made by Japy. The machines were called "P68" or "Japy Personelle". In the 1960s the JAPY SCRIPT was adopted, which was a later restyling, if only in the change to two-tone flat enamel paint, as opposed to single-color crinkle finish paint.

- In the UK: as the post-war Oliver and the Oliver Courier,

The post-war Oliver Portable and Oliver Courier, were based perfectly on the original Patria design. This was the third Oliver portable typewriter design—the first was the Europa, the next the similar Italian-made SIM.

- In Spain: the Patria, Amaya, Pulsatta, Florida and Königer

The Spanish Patria typewriter came on the market in 1947. “Spanish and Swiss technology and experience united have produced this gem of the mechanographic art for you,” states some early advertising. The Patria was recommended to “all those who need to bring work home, but do not wish to give their place of residence the sobriety of an office.” The Patria was distributed throughout Spain by Guillermo Trúniger, S.A., with a good deal of success. It was exported in small quantities as early as 1950 (one Patria sold in Canada and marked “Eaton’s” appears to be a Spanish product).

- And in West Germany: the Voss Privat
