= Rothrist railway station =

Railway station in Rothrist, Switzerland

Rothrist
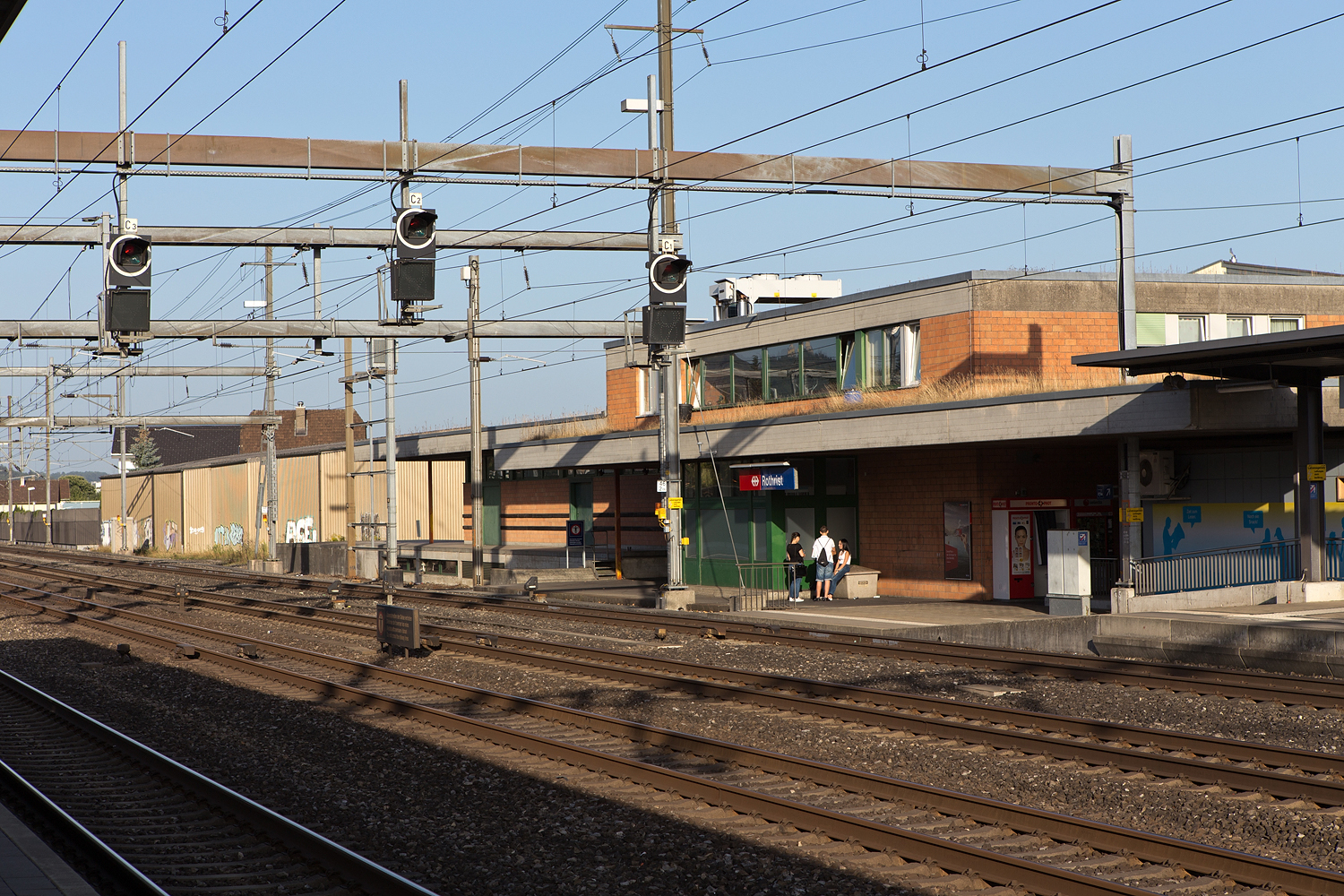
- The station building in 2015

General information
- Location: Rothrist; Switzerland
- Coordinates: 47°18′23″N 7°52′46″E
- Owner: Swiss Federal Railways
- Lines: Mattstetten–Rothrist new line; Olten–Bern line
- Distance: 46.2 km (28.7 mi) from Basel SBB
- Train operators: Swiss Federal Railways
- Connections: Aargau Verkehr buses

Other information
- Fare zone: 521 (Tarifverbund A-Welle)

Passengers
- 2018: 1,200 per weekday

Services
Preceding station	Aargau S-Bahn	Following station
Murgenthal towards Langenthal	S23	Aarburg-Oftringen towards Baden
Location
- Location within Switzerland Location within Canton of Aargau

Rothrist railway station (German: Bahnhof Rothrist) is a railway station in the municipality of Rothrist, in the Swiss canton of Aargau. It is an intermediate stop on the standard gauge Olten–Bern line of Swiss Federal Railways. The high-speed Mattstetten–Rothrist new line diverges west of the station but no trains calling at Rothrist use it.

== Services ==
The following services stop at Rothrist:

- Aargau S-Bahn S23: hourly service between Langenthal and Baden, increasing to half-hourly between Langenthal and Olten on weekdays.
