= Roggwil-Wynau railway station =

Railway station in Switzerland

Roggwil-Wynau
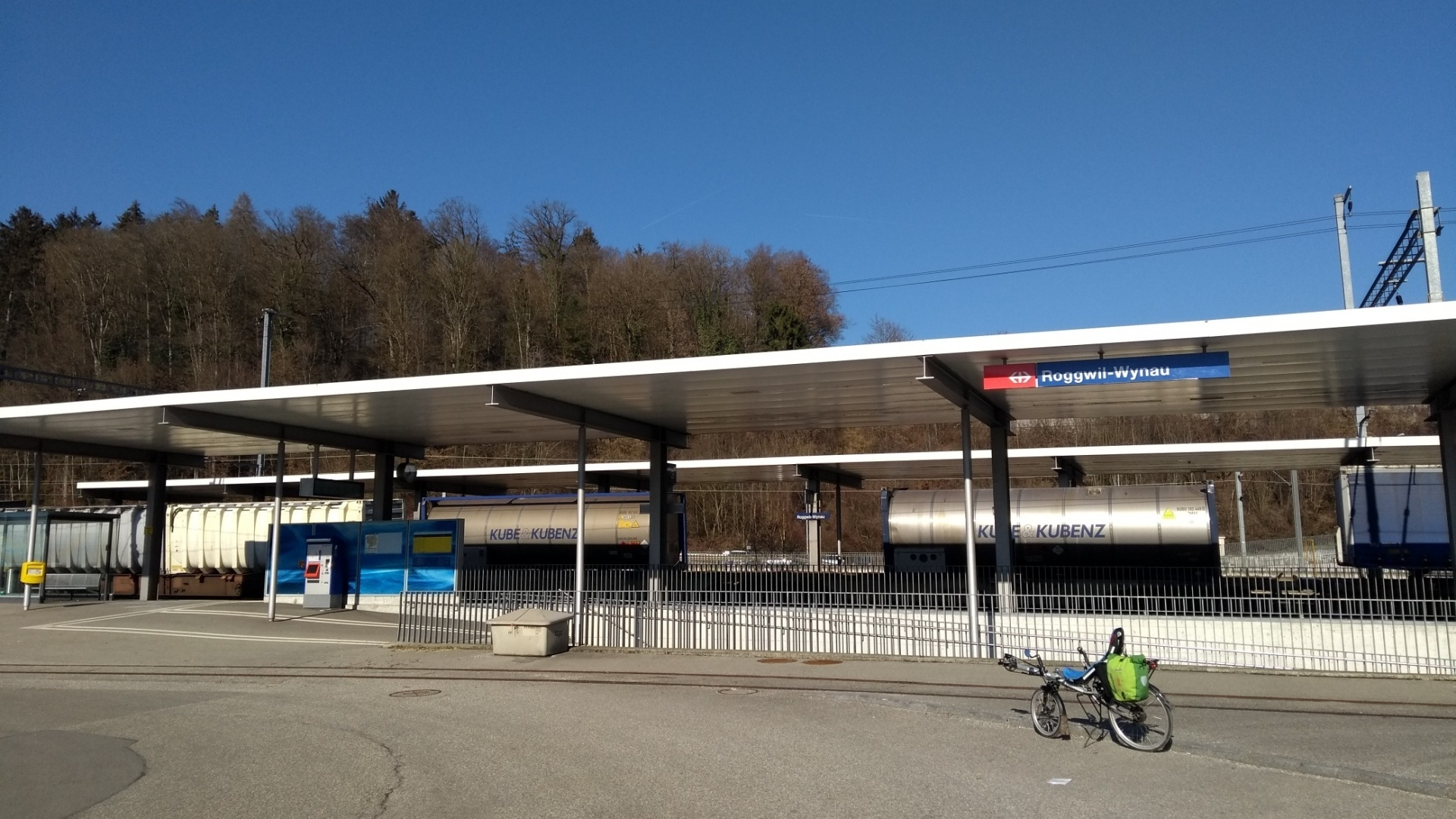
- The station platform in 2018

General information
- Location: Roggwil; Switzerland
- Coordinates: 47°15′06″N 7°48′54″E
- Owner: Swiss Federal Railways
- Line: Olten–Bern line
- Distance: 54.5 km (33.9 mi) from Basel SBB
- Train operators: Swiss Federal Railways

Other information
- Fare zone: 191 (Libero)

Passengers
- 2018: 320 per weekday

Services
Preceding station	Aargau S-Bahn	Following station
Langenthal Terminus	S23	Murgenthal towards Baden
Location
- Location within Switzerland Location within Canton of Bern

Roggwil-Wynau railway station (German: Bahnhof Roggwil-Wynau) is a railway station in the municipality of Roggwil, in the Swiss canton of Bern. It is an intermediate stop on the standard gauge Olten–Bern line of Swiss Federal Railways.

== Services ==
The following services stop at Roggwil-Wynau:

- Aargau S-Bahn S23: hourly service between Langenthal and Baden, increasing to half-hourly between Langenthal and Olten on weekdays.
