= Flumenthal Dam =

Coordinates: 47°13′45″N 7°35′24″E

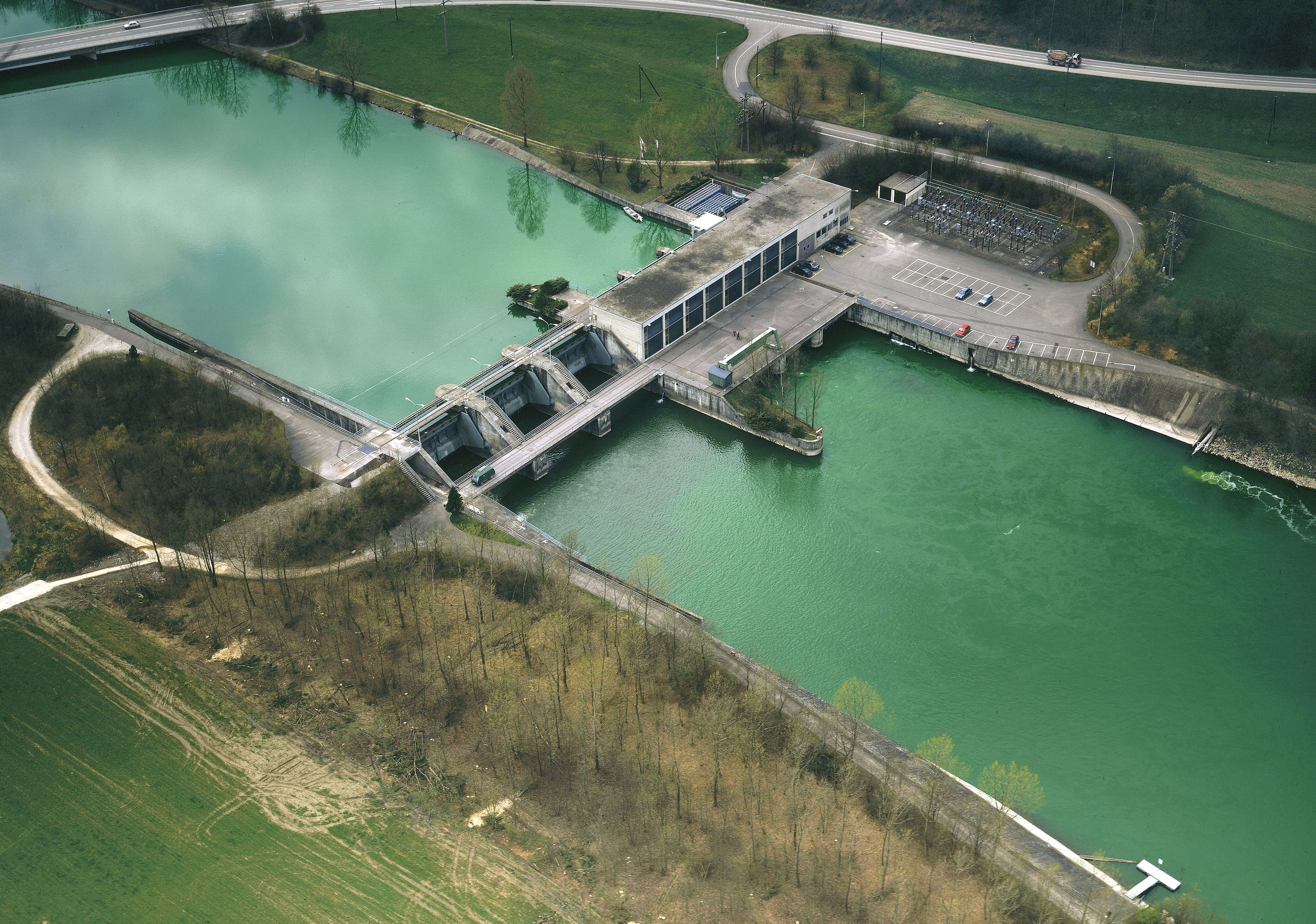
- Interactive map of Flumenthal Dam
- Country: Switzerland
- Status: Operational
- Opening date: 1970

The Flumenthal Dam is a regulating dam at Flumenthal, Switzerland, which was erected as the most important element of all the works of the Second Jura water correction. It was built to regulate the outflow of Seeland's three-lake hydrologic system as far downstream as Solothurn and the confluence with the river Emme River. It works in conjunction with the Regulating Dam Port at Seeland. The works started in 1966, and the dam and adjoining downstream hydroelectric power station were commissioned in 1970.

== The Murgenthal Status ==
The Murgenthal Status stipulates that the flow of the Aare River must not exceed 850m^{3}/s (30,000 cu ft/s) at the gauge of Murgenthal's station, which is located downstream of the confluence of the Aare and the Emme rivers. When the Emme river flow increases, the flow of the Aare downstream of their confluence increases accordingly, which may cause flooding downstream in the cantons of Solothurn and Aargau.

Thus, the Status sets the speed that the Aare should not exceed. If the flow increases too much, then the Regulating Dam Port must limit the flow of the Aare upstream, using the three lakes to absorb the crest of the flood, until the Emme's overflow subsides.

== Water concession ==
Approximatively 62% of the concession's length belongs to the canton of Solothurn, the remaining 38% to the canton of Bern. Therefore, the electricity company ATEL is running the operation, while BKW receives 38% dues in electricity.
