= Roggwil, Bern =

Roggwil
- Municipality
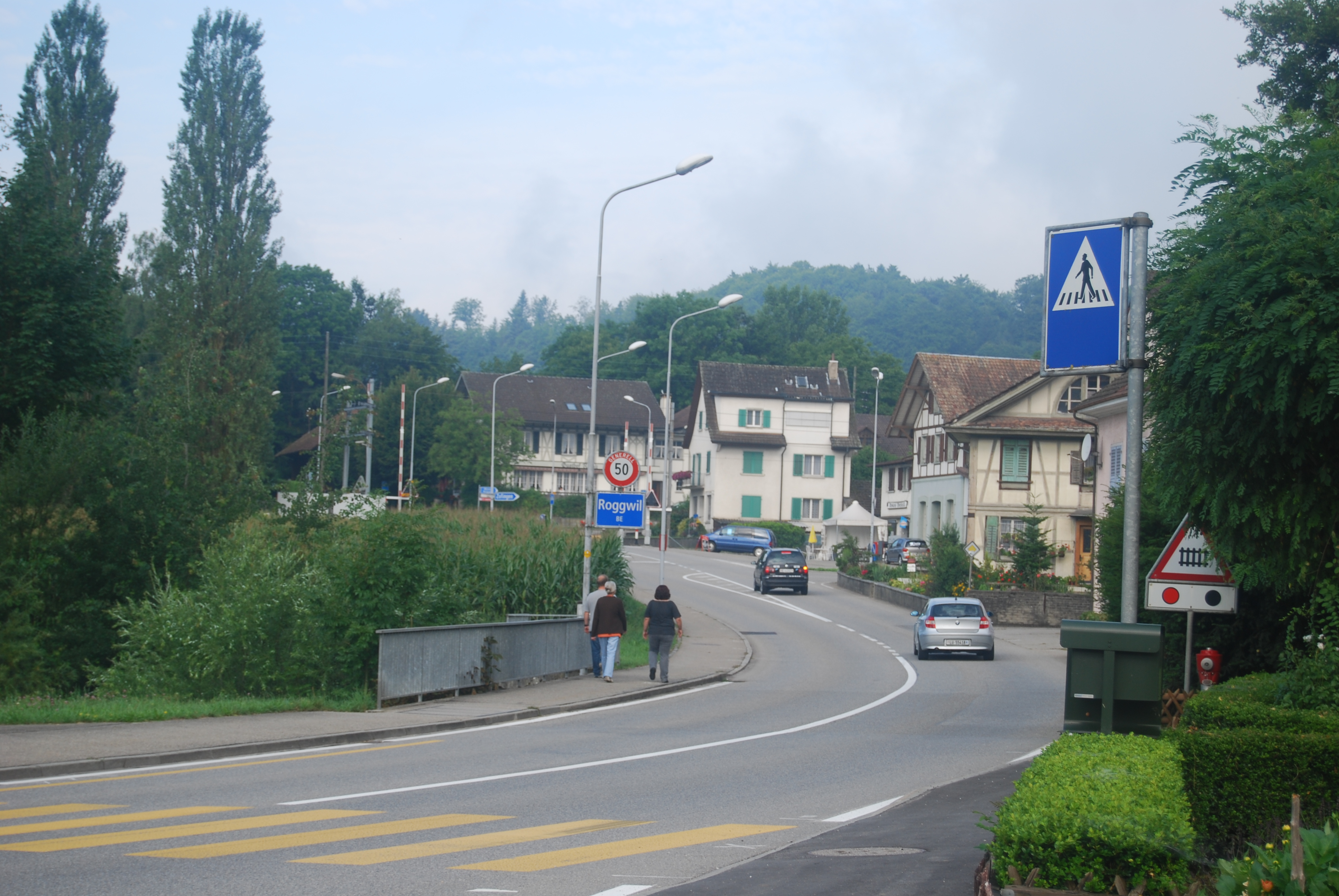
- Roggwil village

- Flag Coat of arms
- Location of Roggwil
- Location within Switzerland Location within Canton of Bern
- Coordinates: 47°15′N 7°49′E
- Country: Switzerland
- Canton: Bern
- District: Oberaargau

Area
  - Total: 7.73 km^{2} (2.98 sq mi)
- Elevation: 421 m (1,381 ft)

Population (December 2020)
  - Total: 4,176
  - Density: 540/km^{2} (1,400/sq mi)
- Time zone: UTC+01:00 (CET)
  - Summer (DST): UTC+02:00 (CEST)
- Postal code: 4914
- SFOS number: 337
- ISO 3166 code: CH-BE
- Surrounded by: Aarwangen, Langenthal, Murgenthal (AG), Pfaffnau (LU), Untersteckholz, Wynau
- Website: roggwil.ch

Roggwil is a municipality in the Oberaargau administrative district in the canton of Bern in Switzerland.

== History ==
Aerial view from 500 m by Walter Mittelholzer (1924)

Roggwil is first mentioned in 949 as Rocchonuuillare.

A variety of Roman era objects and fragments of buildings or small settlement have been found in Roggwil. During the High Middle Ages the village was guarded by a fort at Chülperg. It was owned by the Barons of Bechburg and was directly ruled by a branch of this family that took their name from the village. When St. Urban's Abbey was founded in 1194, the Lords of Roggwil granted the Abbey land in the village. Through donations and purchase the Abbey grew to become the primary landlord and ruler over the village by 1250. In 1406 the city of Bern bought the County of Burgundy, which included Roggwil, from the Kyburgs. In 1413 Bern was able to gain control of the courts of the Roggwil and sharply restricted the Abbey's power. Initially the village shared a low court with Wynau and was part of the Amt of Wangen. Between 1580 and 1590 it was reallocated to the Amt of Aarwangen. After the 1798 French invasion, Roggwil attempted to join the Canton of Aarau under the Helvetic Republic, but it was assigned to the Bernese district of Langenthal. In 1803, under the Act of Mediation, it became part of the district of Aarwangen.

The village church was first mentioned in 1201 as a daughter church of the parish church in Wynau. In 1664, Roggwil, Balzenwil, Gruben and Walliswil formed an independent parish. The current church was built in 1664–65, while the Catholic one was built in 1973 and the New Apostolic Church was finished in 1985.

In the 18th and 19th century the population began to grow as cottage industry weaving began to supplement agriculture. In 1857 the Olten-Bern railway built a station in Roggwil. This was followed by the narrow-gauge Langenthal-Roggwil-Melchnau line in 1917. The railroad promoted industrialization in the formerly agrarian village. A cotton mill opened in 1862, followed by a brick factory in 1904 and a machinery factory in 1924. Agriculture declined throughout the 20th century and in 2005 both the manufacturing and the services sector each represented about 48% of all jobs. The population grew as industry grew in Roggwil and in 1870 the Rotbrüsteliquartier was built to provide housing for factory workers. Most factories have developed in the large Brunnmatt industrial district. The growth of the municipality required an expansion of the infrastructure. A secondary school opened in 1962, a town hall in 1965, a retirement home in 1985 and in 1987 a small municipal power plant.

== Geography ==
Roggwil has an area of 7.84 km^{2} (3.03 sq mi). Of this area, 3.54 km^{2} (1.37 mi^{2}) or 45.4% is used for agricultural purposes, while 2.2 km^{2} (0.85 mi^{2}) or 28.2% is forested. Of the rest of the land, 2.01 km^{2} (0.78 mi^{2}) or 25.8% is settled (buildings or roads), 0.06 km^{2} (15 acres) or 0.8% is either rivers or lakes and 0.01 km^{2} (2.5 acres) or 0.1% is unproductive land.

Of the built up area, industrial buildings made up 2.4% of the total area while housing and buildings made up 11.7% and transportation infrastructure made up 7.8%. Power and water infrastructure as well as other special developed areas made up 2.7% of the area while parks, green belts and sports fields made up 1.2%. Out of the forested land, 26.4% of the total land area is heavily forested and 1.8% is covered with orchards or small clusters of trees. Of the agricultural land, 29.8% is used for growing crops and 14.9% is pastures. All the water in the municipality is flowing water.

It consists of the village of Roggwil, the hamlet of Kalteherberge and scattered farm houses.

On 31 December 2009 Amtsbezirk Aarwangen, the municipality's former district, was dissolved. On the following day, 1 January 2010, it joined the newly created Verwaltungskreis Oberaargau.

== Coat of arms ==
The blazon of the municipal coat of arms is Gules a wreath of Linden branches Vert frettee with three Rye Ears Or. The ears of rye (German: Roggen) makes this an example of canting arms.

== Demographics ==
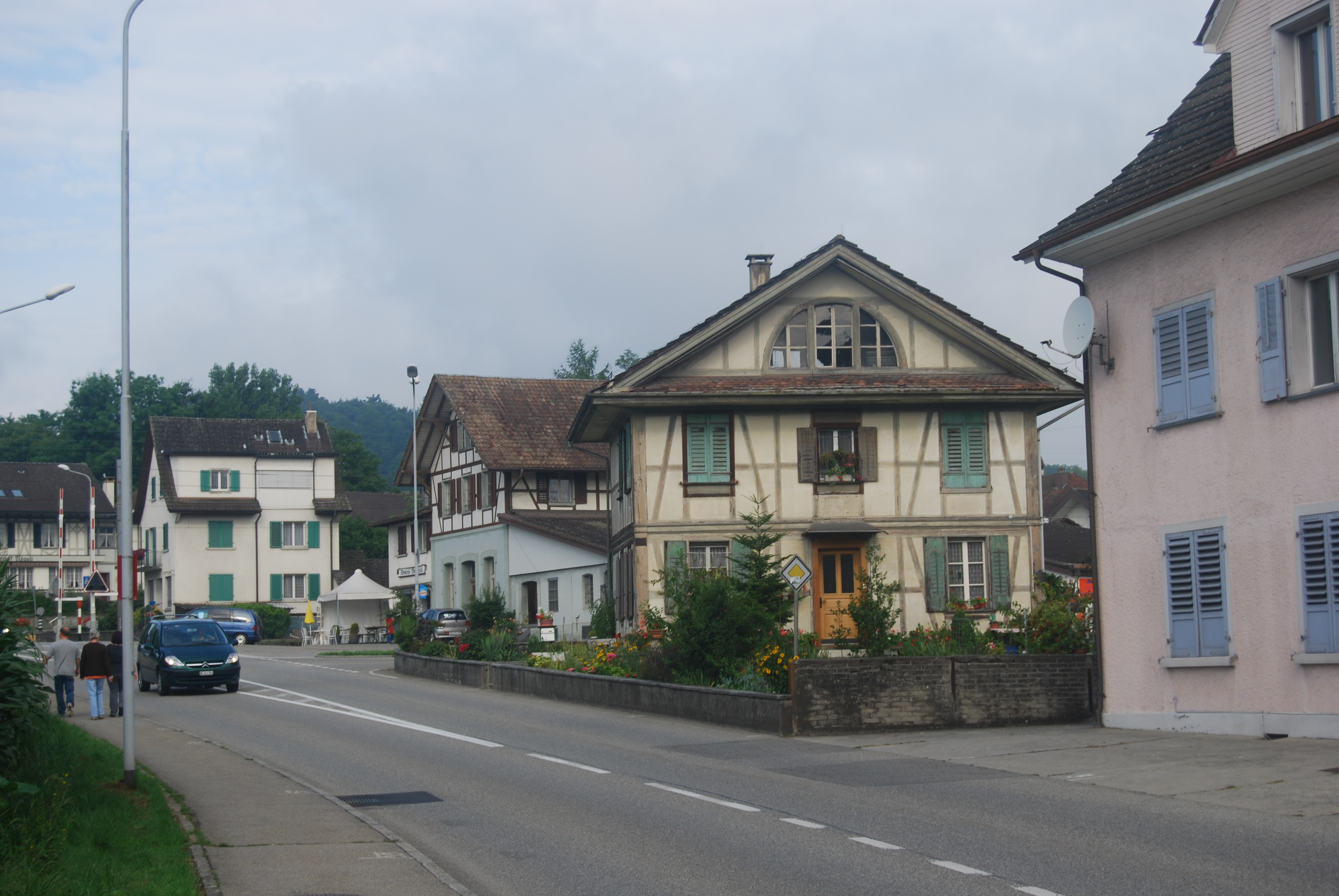
Older houses in Roggwil

Roggwil has a population (as of December 2020) of 4,176. As of 2010, 12.8% of the population are resident foreign nationals. Over the last 10 years (2000-2010) the population has changed at a rate of 6%. Migration accounted for 9%, while births and deaths accounted for -2.6%.

Most of the population (as of 2000) speaks German (3,317 or 92.1%) as their first language, Italian is the second most common (72 or 2.0%) and Albanian is the third (46 or 1.3%). There are 10 people who speak French.

As of 2008, the population was 49.6% male and 50.4% female. The population was made up of 1,637 Swiss men (42.6% of the population) and 268 (7.0%) non-Swiss men. There were 1,712 Swiss women (44.6%) and 223 (5.8%) non-Swiss women. Of the population in the municipality, 1,117 or about 31.0% were born in Roggwil and lived there in 2000. There were 1,170 or 32.5% who were born in the same canton, while 763 or 21.2% were born somewhere else in Switzerland, and 441 or 12.3% were born outside of Switzerland.

As of 2010, children and teenagers (0–19 years old) make up 22.3% of the population, while adults (20–64 years old) make up 58.8% and seniors (over 64 years old) make up 18.9%.

As of 2000, there were 1,386 people who were single and never married in the municipality. There were 1,770 married individuals, 252 widows or widowers and 192 individuals who are divorced.

As of 2000, there were 414 households that consist of only one person and 119 households with five or more people. In 2000, a total of 1,409 apartments (88.4% of the total) were permanently occupied, while 88 apartments (5.5%) were seasonally occupied and 97 apartments (6.1%) were empty. As of 2010, the construction rate of new housing units was 2.9 new units per 1000 residents. The vacancy rate for the municipality, in 2011, was 2.55%.

The historical population is given in the following chart:

== Politics ==
In the 2011 federal election the most popular party was the SVP which received 29.9% of the vote. The next three most popular parties were the SPS (23.8%), the BDP Party (15.8%) and the FDP (7.2%). In the federal election, a total of 1,388 votes were cast, and the voter turnout was 50.7%.

== Economy ==
As of 2011, Roggwil had an unemployment rate of 2.63%. As of 2008, there were a total of 1,318 people employed in the municipality. Of these, there were 46 people employed in the primary economic sector and about 18 businesses involved in this sector. 648 people were employed in the secondary sector and there were 40 businesses in this sector. 624 people were employed in the tertiary sector, with 99 businesses in this sector.

In 2008 there were a total of 1,080 full-time equivalent jobs. The number of jobs in the primary sector was 27, of which 22 were in agriculture and 5 were in forestry or lumber production. The number of jobs in the secondary sector was 595 of which 507 or (85.2%) were in manufacturing and 88 (14.8%) were in construction. The number of jobs in the tertiary sector was 458. In the tertiary sector; 89 or 19.4% were in wholesale or retail sales or the repair of motor vehicles, 86 or 18.8% were in the movement and storage of goods, 60 or 13.1% were in a hotel or restaurant, 3 or 0.7% were in the information industry, 8 or 1.7% were the insurance or financial industry, 12 or 2.6% were technical professionals or scientists, 40 or 8.7% were in education and 90 or 19.7% were in health care.

In 2000, there were 761 workers who commuted into the municipality and 1,151 workers who commuted away. The municipality is a net exporter of workers, with about 1.5 workers leaving the municipality for every one entering. Of the working population, 12.8% used public transportation to get to work, and 57.7% used a private car.

== Religion ==
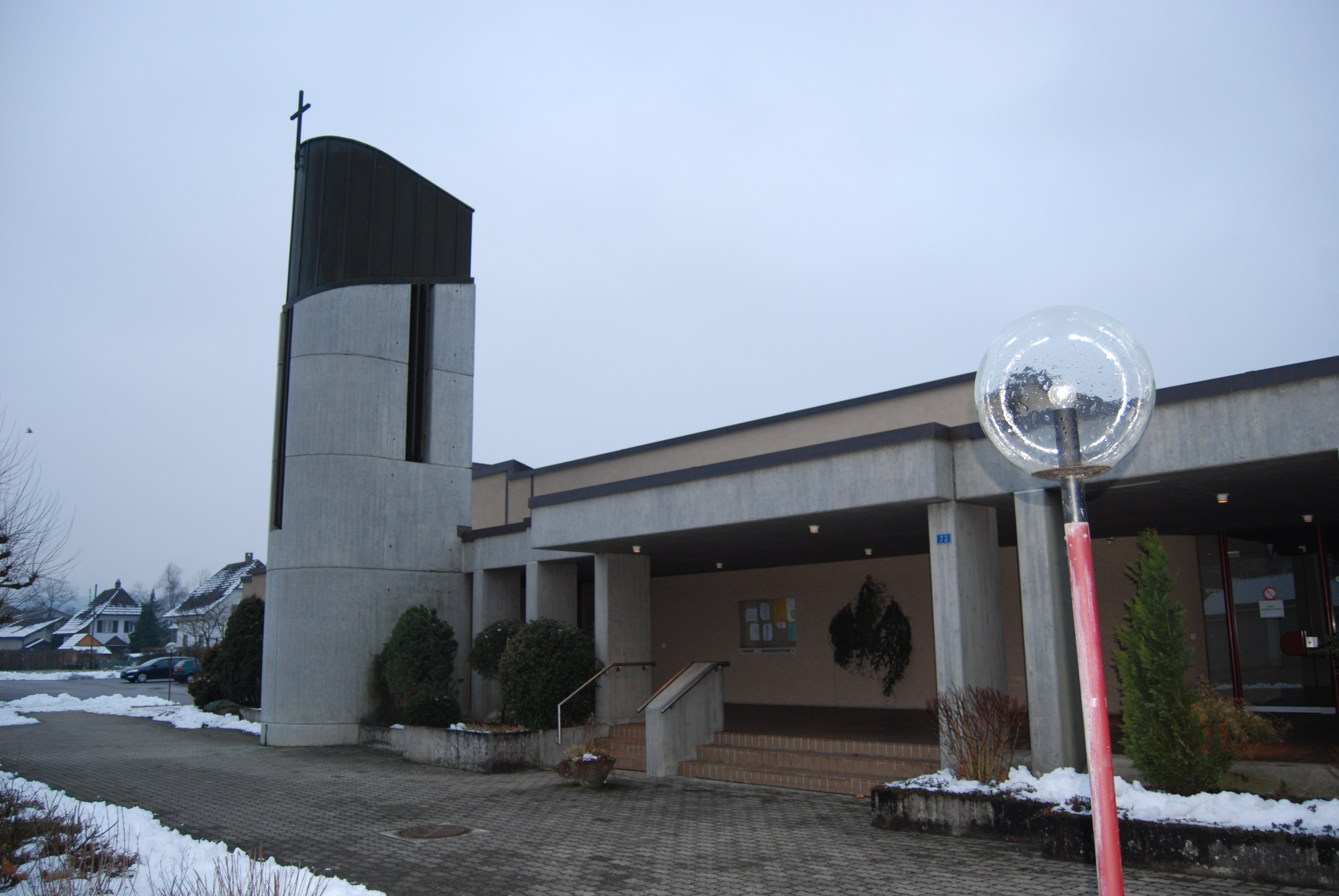
Roggwil's Catholic church

From the 2000 census, 597 or 16.6% were Roman Catholic, while 2,289 or 63.6% belonged to the Swiss Reformed Church. Of the rest of the population, there were 33 members of an Orthodox church (or about 0.92% of the population), there was 1 individual who belongs to the Christian Catholic Church, and there were 288 individuals (or about 8.00% of the population) who belonged to another Christian church. There were 181 (or about 5.03% of the population) who were Islamic. There were 2 individuals who were Buddhist, 43 individuals who were Hindu and 5 individuals who belonged to another church. 198 (or about 5.50% of the population) belonged to no church, are agnostic or atheist, and 107 individuals (or about 2.97% of the population) did not answer the question.

== Education ==
In Roggwil about 1,389 or (38.6%) of the population have completed non-mandatory upper secondary education, and 368 or (10.2%) have completed additional higher education (either university or a Fachhochschule). Of the 368 who completed tertiary schooling, 73.1% were Swiss men, 21.5% were Swiss women, 3.0% were non-Swiss men and 2.4% were non-Swiss women.

The Canton of Bern school system provides one year of non-obligatory Kindergarten, followed by six years of Primary school. This is followed by three years of obligatory lower Secondary school where the students are separated according to ability and aptitude. Following the lower Secondary students may attend additional schooling or they may enter an apprenticeship.

During the 2009–10 school year, there were a total of 467 students attending classes in Roggwil. There were 3 kindergarten classes with a total of 59 students in the municipality. Of the kindergarten students, 18.6% were permanent or temporary residents of Switzerland (not citizens) and 11.9% have a different mother language than the classroom language. The municipality had 13 primary classes and 247 students. Of the primary students, 10.9% were permanent or temporary residents of Switzerland (not citizens) and 9.7% have a different mother language than the classroom language. During the same year, there were 8 lower secondary classes with a total of 153 students. There were 19.0% who were permanent or temporary residents of Switzerland (not citizens) and 23.5% have a different mother language than the classroom language.

As of 2000, there were 202 students in Roggwil who came from another municipality, while 114 residents attended schools outside the municipality.

== Transportation ==
The municipality has seven railway stations. The primary station is Roggwil-Wynau, on the Olten–Bern railway line, with regular service to Langenthal and Baden. The other six are located on the narrow-gauge Langenthal–Melchnau railway line.
