= Murgenthal railway station =

Railway station in Switzerland

Murgenthal
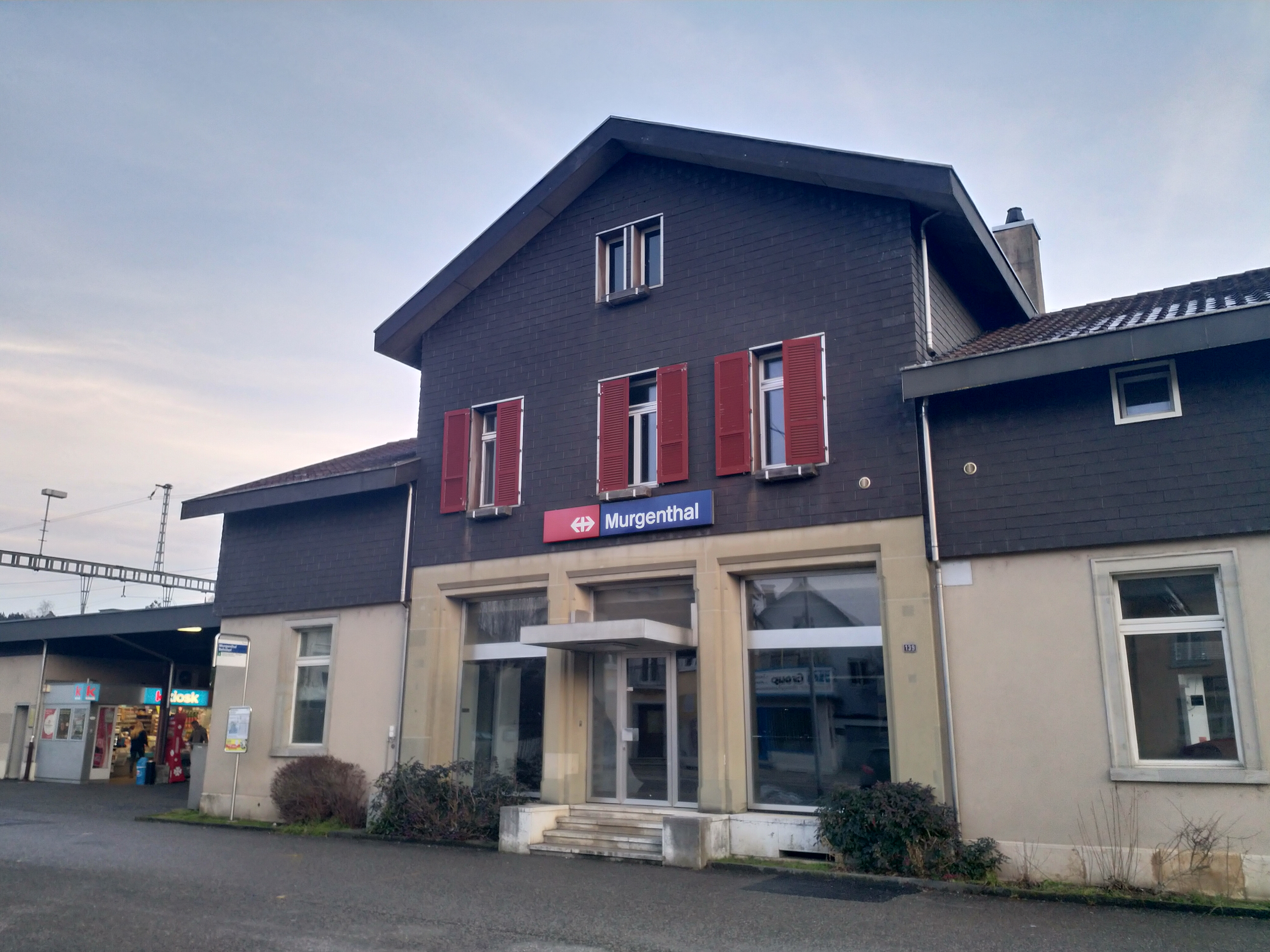
- The station building in 2019

General information
- Location: Murgenthal; Switzerland
- Coordinates: 47°15′55″N 7°49′56″E
- Owner: Swiss Federal Railways
- Line: Olten–Bern line
- Distance: 52.2 km (32.4 mi) from Basel SBB
- Train operators: Swiss Federal Railways
- Connections: Aargau Verkehr buses

Other information
- Fare zone: 191 (Libero); 519 (Tarifverbund A-Welle)

Passengers
- 2018: 590 per weekday

Services
Preceding station	Aargau S-Bahn	Following station
Roggwil-Wynau towards Langenthal	S23	Rothrist towards Baden
Location
- Location within Switzerland Location within Canton of Aargau

Murgenthal railway station (German: Bahnhof Murgenthal) is a railway station in the municipality of Murgenthal, in the Swiss canton of Aargau. It is an intermediate stop on the standard gauge Olten–Bern line of Swiss Federal Railways.

== Services ==
The following services stop at Murgenthal:

- Aargau S-Bahn S23: hourly service between Langenthal and Baden, increasing to half-hourly between Langenthal and Olten on weekdays.
