= Regulating Dam Port, Seeland, Switzerland =

Dam that controls levels of three lakes in Switzerland

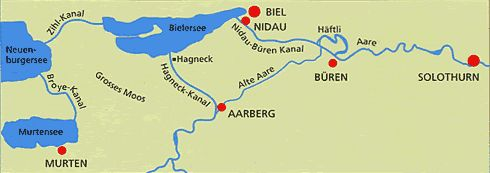
Map of the area following the construction of the canal

During the first Jura water correction, a temporary dam had been built across the Nidau-Büren channel in order to maintain the water level in Lake Bienne. Of insufficient retaining capacity, another one in 1887 that also showed its limits, especially during a flood in 1910, quickly replaced it.

Soon, the cantons of Vaud, Neuchâtel and Fribourg required its replacement, but it was only modified in 1911 and 1915.

Finally, the building of the new regulating dam was started in Port in 1936, and completed and commissioned in 1939. This dam ensures the level control of the three lakes of Neuchâtel, Morat and Bienne, an area so called the "Seeland”, as well as the outflow of the Aare river downstream toward Solothurn, Aargau and the junction with Emme River down to the merging with the Rhine River. The three lakes act as a buffer zone, absorbing waters of the Aare in the event of any upstream flooding as far as the lakes Thun and Brienz and of course “Grand Marais”.

Since the Second Jura water correction, the Murgenthal Status regulates the maximum and minimum levels of the three lakes, as well as the maximum outflow downstream. The system was completed with the Flumenthal dam regulating the flow further downstream of the merging of river Emme.

== Sources ==
- "Barrage de régulation de Port" (PDF). (873 KB) par l'Office de l'économie hydraulique du canton de Berne
- "Régulation du niveau des lacs du Pied du Jura en cas de crue" (PDF). Archived from the original (PDF) on 2007-09-30. (704 KB) par l'Office de l'économie hydraulique du canton de Berne
- "D'une gestion technique à une gestion intégrée: l'exemple de la région des trois lacs" (PDF). Archived from the original (PDF) on 2008-02-21. (4.94 MB)
