= Pfaffnau =

- Municipality
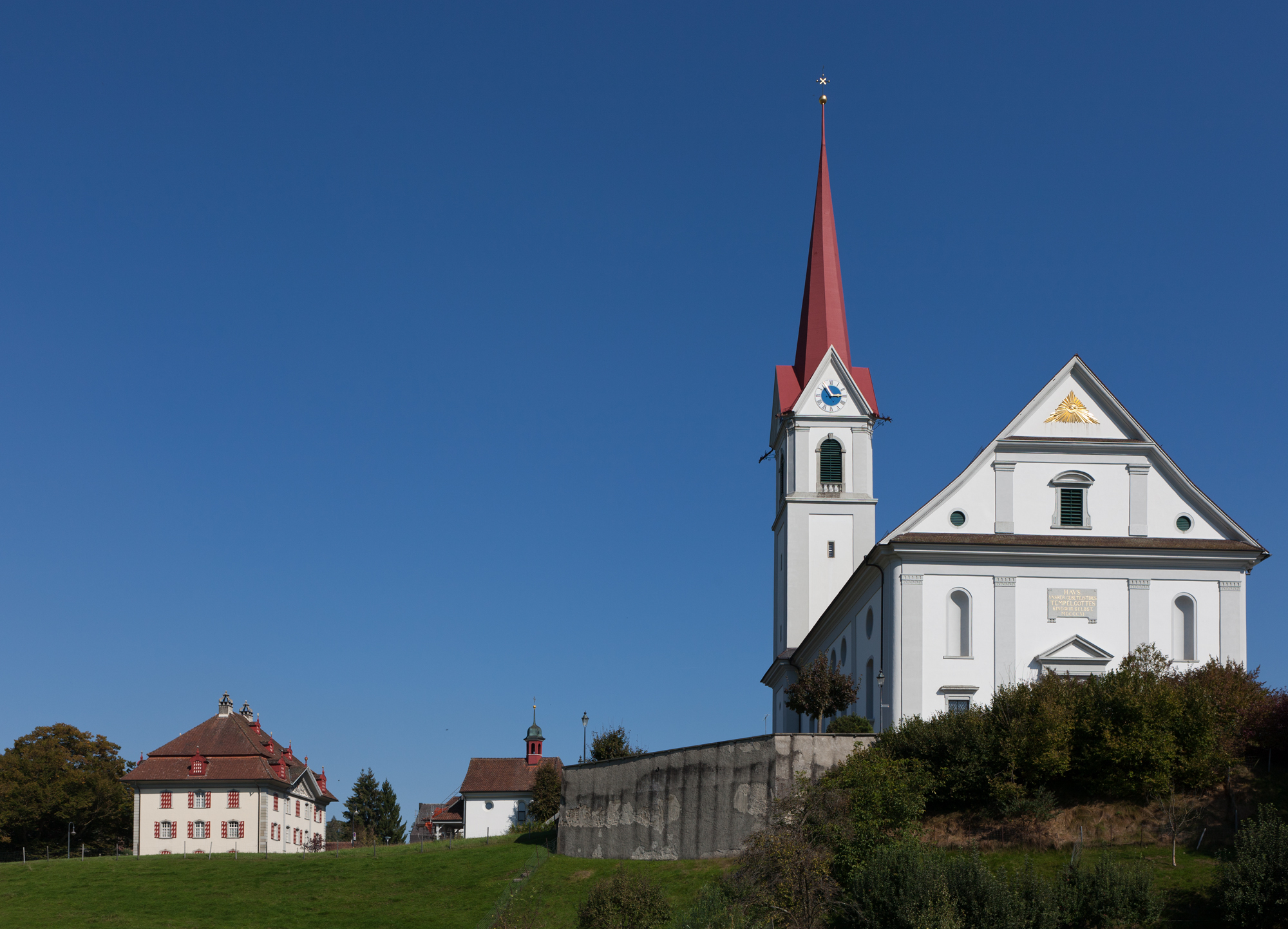

- Flag Coat of arms
- Location of Pfaffnau
- Location within Switzerland Location within Canton of Lucerne
- Coordinates: 47°14′N 7°54′E
- Country: Switzerland
- Canton: Lucerne
- District: Willisau

Area
  - Total: 17.57 km^{2} (6.78 sq mi)
- Elevation: 507 m (1,663 ft)

Population (December 2020)
  - Total: 2,674
  - Density: 152.2/km^{2} (394.2/sq mi)
- Time zone: UTC+01:00 (CET)
  - Summer (DST): UTC+02:00 (CEST)
- Postal code: 4915,6264
- SFOS number: 1139
- ISO 3166 code: CH-LU
- Surrounded by: Altbüron, Brittnau (AG), Grossdietwil, Melchnau (BE), Murgenthal (AG), Reiden, Roggliswil, Roggwil (BE), Untersteckholz (BE)
- Website: www.pfaffnau.ch

Pfaffnau is a municipality in the district of Willisau in the canton of Lucerne in Switzerland. In the municipality two different parts are existing, the village Pfaffnau and the Former Monastery of St. Urban.

== History ==
Pfaffnau is first mentioned in 924 as Fafanhaa/Fafana. In 1173 it was mentioned as Phafena.

== Geography ==
Aerial view (1953)

Pfaffnau has an area of 17.68 km^{2} (6.83 sq mi). Of this area, 11.41 km^{2} (4.41 mi^{2}) or 64.8% is used for agricultural purposes, while 4.3 km^{2} (1.7 mi^{2}) or 24.4% is forested. Of the rest of the land, 1.71 km^{2} (0.66 mi^{2}) or 9.7% is settled (buildings or roads), 0.09 km^{2} (22 acres) or 0.5% is either rivers or lakes and 0.04 km^{2} (9.9 acres) or 0.2% is unproductive land.

Of the built up area, housing and buildings made up 5.3% and transportation infrastructure made up 2.6%. Out of the forested land, 23.0% of the total land area is heavily forested and 1.4% is covered with orchards or small clusters of trees. Of the agricultural land, 41.5% is used for growing crops and 21.6% is pastures, while 1.7% is used for orchards or vine crops. All the water in the municipality is flowing water.

The municipality is located in the hill country in the north-west corner of the canton, on the border with the cantons of Bern and Aargau. It consists of the former abbey village (Klosterdorf) of Pfaffnau and the hamlets of Burg, Buttenried, Murhof, Nuttele, Sagen, Schuelerslehn and Sankt Urban.

== Demographics ==
Pfaffnau has a population (as of December 2020) of 2,674. As of 2008, 8.5% of the population are resident foreign nationals. Over the last 10 years (2000–2010) the population has changed at a rate of 0.5%. Migration accounted for 0%, while births and deaths accounted for 1.2%.

Most of the population (as of 2000) speaks German (2,247 or 94.0%) as their first language, Serbo-Croatian is the second most common (41 or 1.7%) and Albanian is the third (23 or 1.0%). There are 10 people who speak French, 6 people who speak Italian and 2 people who speak Romansh.

As of 2008, the population was made up of 1,941 Swiss citizens and 181 non-citizen residents (8.53% of the population). Of the population in the municipality, 977 or about 40.9% were born in Pfaffnau and lived there in 2000. There were 585 or 24.5% who were born in the same canton, while 480 or 20.1% were born somewhere else in Switzerland, and 220 or 9.2% were born outside of Switzerland.

As of 2010, children and teenagers (0–19 years old) make up 21.8% of the population, while adults (20–64 years old) make up 62.2% and seniors (over 64 years old) make up 16%.

As of 2000, there were 1,182 people who were single and never married in the municipality. There were 992 married individuals, 139 widows or widowers and 77 individuals who are divorced.

As of 2000, there were 205 households that consist of only one person and 115 households with five or more people. In 2000, a total of 763 apartments (86.5% of the total) were permanently occupied, while 74 apartments (8.4%) were seasonally occupied and 45 apartments (5.1%) were empty. As of 2010, the construction rate of new housing units was 16.4 new units per 1000 residents. The vacancy rate for the municipality, in 2011, was 0.39%.

The historical population is given in the following chart:

== Heritage sites of national significance ==
The Former Monastery of St. Urban, Catholic Parish Church of St. Vinzenz with cemetery chapel and the rectory with tithe barn are listed as Swiss heritage site of national significance.

== Politics ==
In the 2011 federal election the most popular party was the CVP which received 40.5% of the vote. The next three most popular parties were the SVP (27.3%), the FDP (14%) and the SPS (6.2%). In the federal election, a total of 806 votes were cast, and the voter turnout was 49.9%.

== Economy ==
As of 2011, Pfaffnau had an unemployment rate of 1.61%. As of 2008, there were a total of 1,319 people employed in the municipality. Of these, there were 204 people employed in the primary economic sector and about 74 businesses involved in this sector. 171 people were employed in the secondary sector and there were 21 businesses in this sector. 944 people were employed in the tertiary sector, with 59 businesses in this sector.

In 2008 there were a total of 1,039 full-time equivalent jobs. The number of jobs in the primary sector was 124, of which 122 were in agriculture and 2 were in forestry or lumber production. The number of jobs in the secondary sector was 160 of which 85 or (53.1%) were in manufacturing and 75 (46.9%) were in construction. The number of jobs in the tertiary sector was 755. In the tertiary sector; 131 or 17.4% were in wholesale or retail sales or the repair of motor vehicles, 19 or 2.5% were in the movement and storage of goods, 9 or 1.2% were in a hotel or restaurant, 5 or 0.7% were in the information industry, 6 or 0.8% were the insurance or financial industry, 18 or 2.4% were technical professionals or scientists, 28 or 3.7% were in education and 519 or 68.7% were in health care.

In 2000, there were 597 workers who commuted into the municipality and 590 workers who commuted away. The municipality is a net importer of workers, with about 1.0 workers entering the municipality for every one leaving. Of the working population, 8.2% used public transportation to get to work, and 53.1% used a private car.

== Religion ==
From the 2000 census, 1,691 or 70.8% were Roman Catholic, while 362 or 15.1% belonged to the Swiss Reformed Church. Of the rest of the population, there were 93 members of an Orthodox church (or about 3.89% of the population), there was 1 individual who belongs to the Christian Catholic Church, and there were 34 individuals (or about 1.42% of the population) who belonged to another Christian church. There was 1 individual who was Jewish, and 61 (or about 2.55% of the population) who were Islamic. There were 11 individuals who were Hindu. 87 (or about 3.64% of the population) belonged to no church, are agnostic or atheist, and 65 individuals (or about 2.72% of the population) did not answer the question.

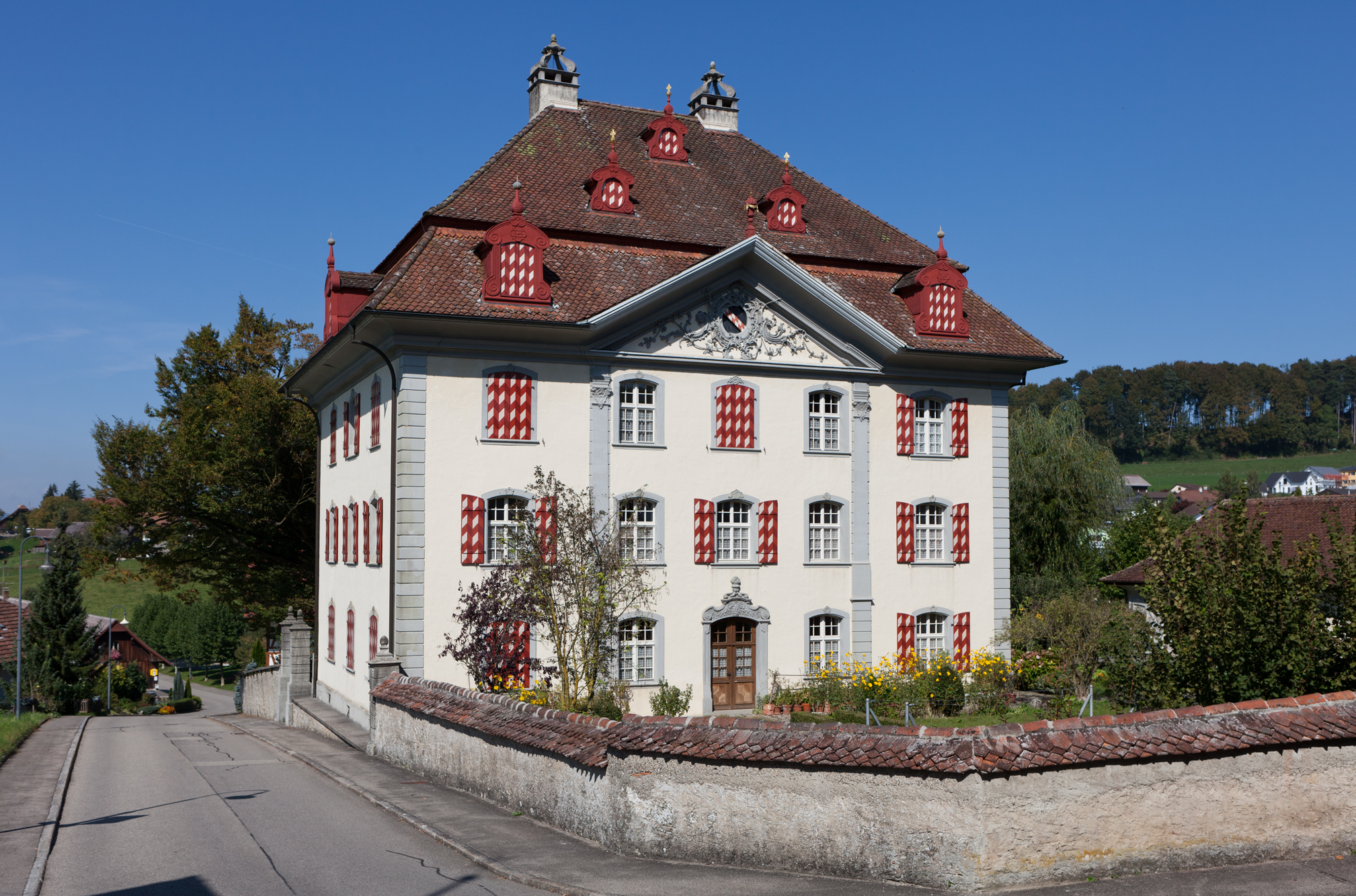
Pfaffnau, rectory with tithe barn

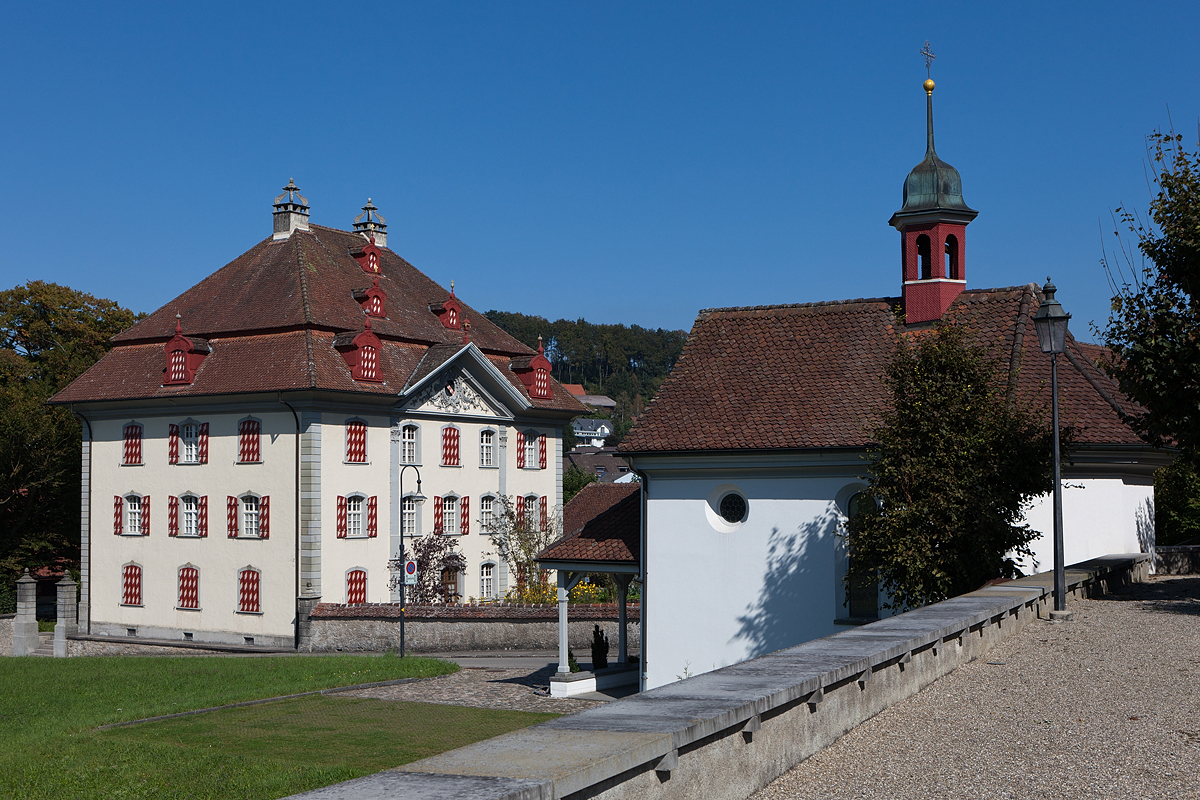
Pfaffnau, rectory and Chapel of St. Antonius

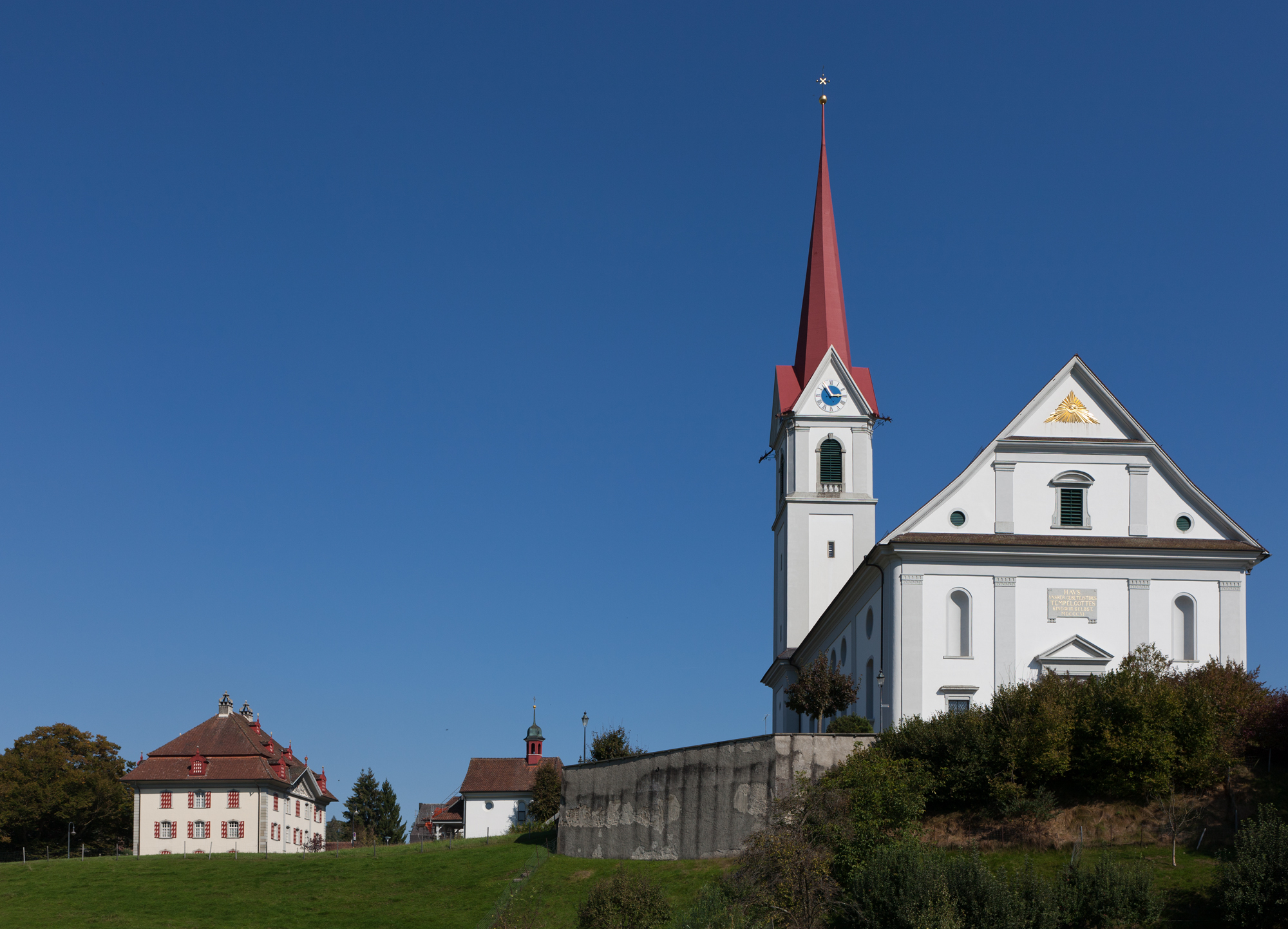
Pfaffnau, Catholic Parish Church of St. Vinzenz

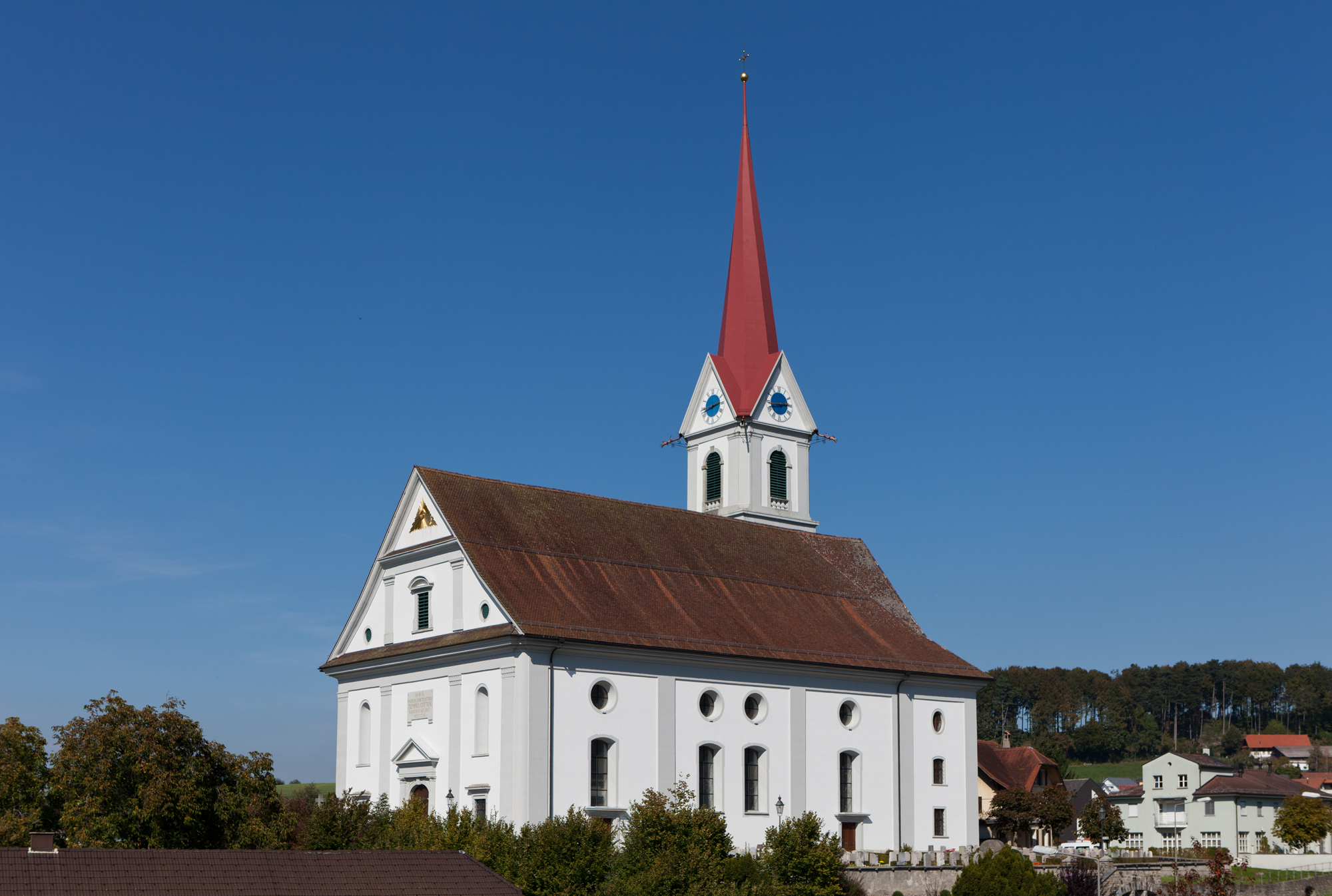
Pfaffnau, Parish Church

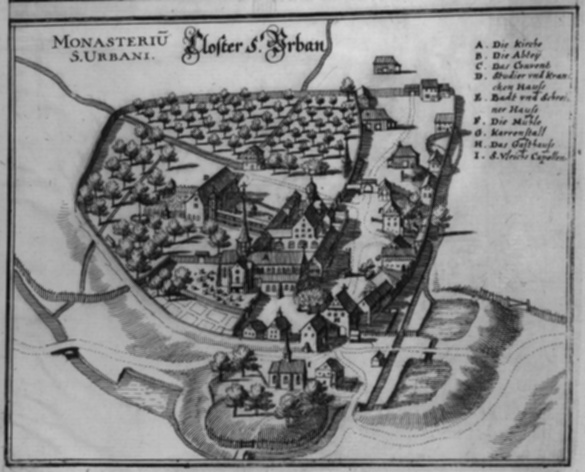
St. Urban's Abbey 1654

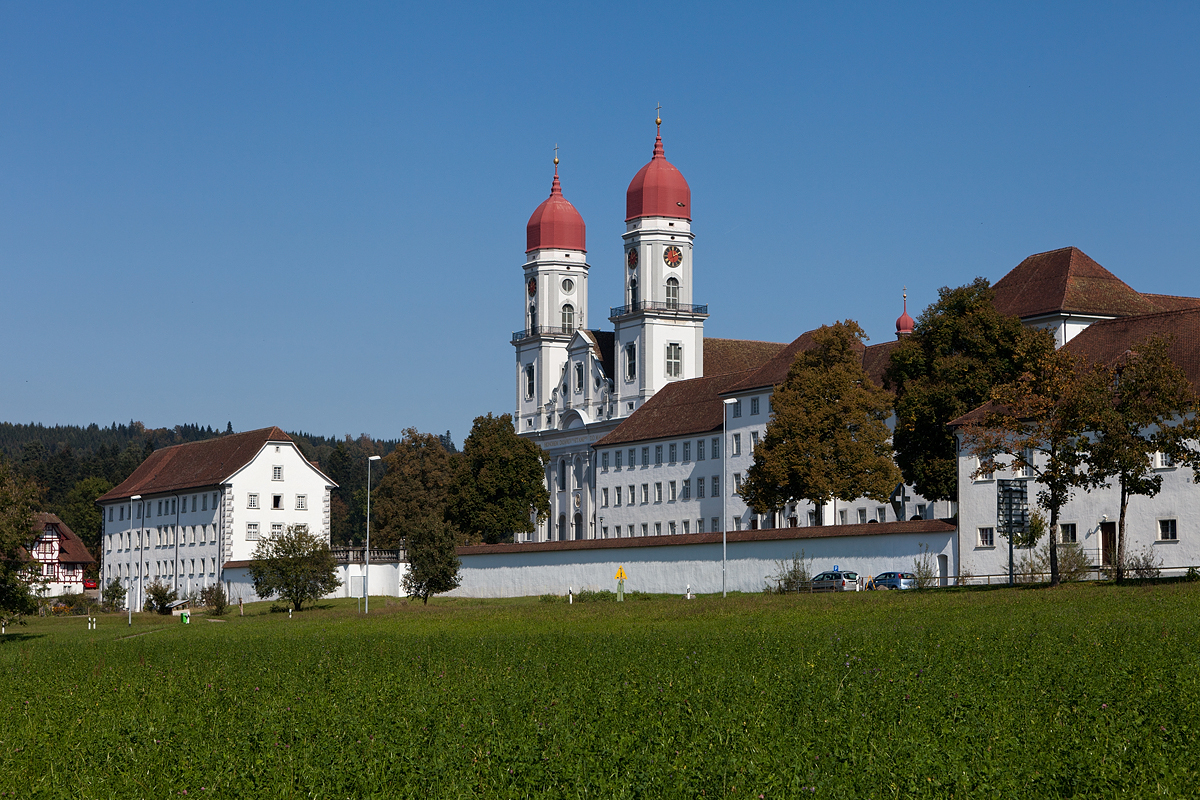
Former Monastery of St. Urban

== Education ==
In Pfaffnau about 797 or (33.3%) of the population have completed non-mandatory upper secondary education, and 214 or (9.0%) have completed additional higher education (either university or a Fachhochschule). Of the 214 who completed tertiary schooling, 71.5% were Swiss men, 19.6% were Swiss women, 6.5% were non-Swiss men and 2.3% were non-Swiss women.

As of 2000, there were 45 students in Pfaffnau who came from another municipality, while 105 residents attended schools outside the municipality.

Pfaffnau is home to the Schul- und Gemeindebibliothek Pfaffnau (municipal library of Pfaffnau). The library has (as of 2008) 3,850 books or other media, and loaned out 4,394 items in the same year. It was open a total of 195 days with average of 11.5 hours per week during that year.
