= Rothrist =

- Municipality
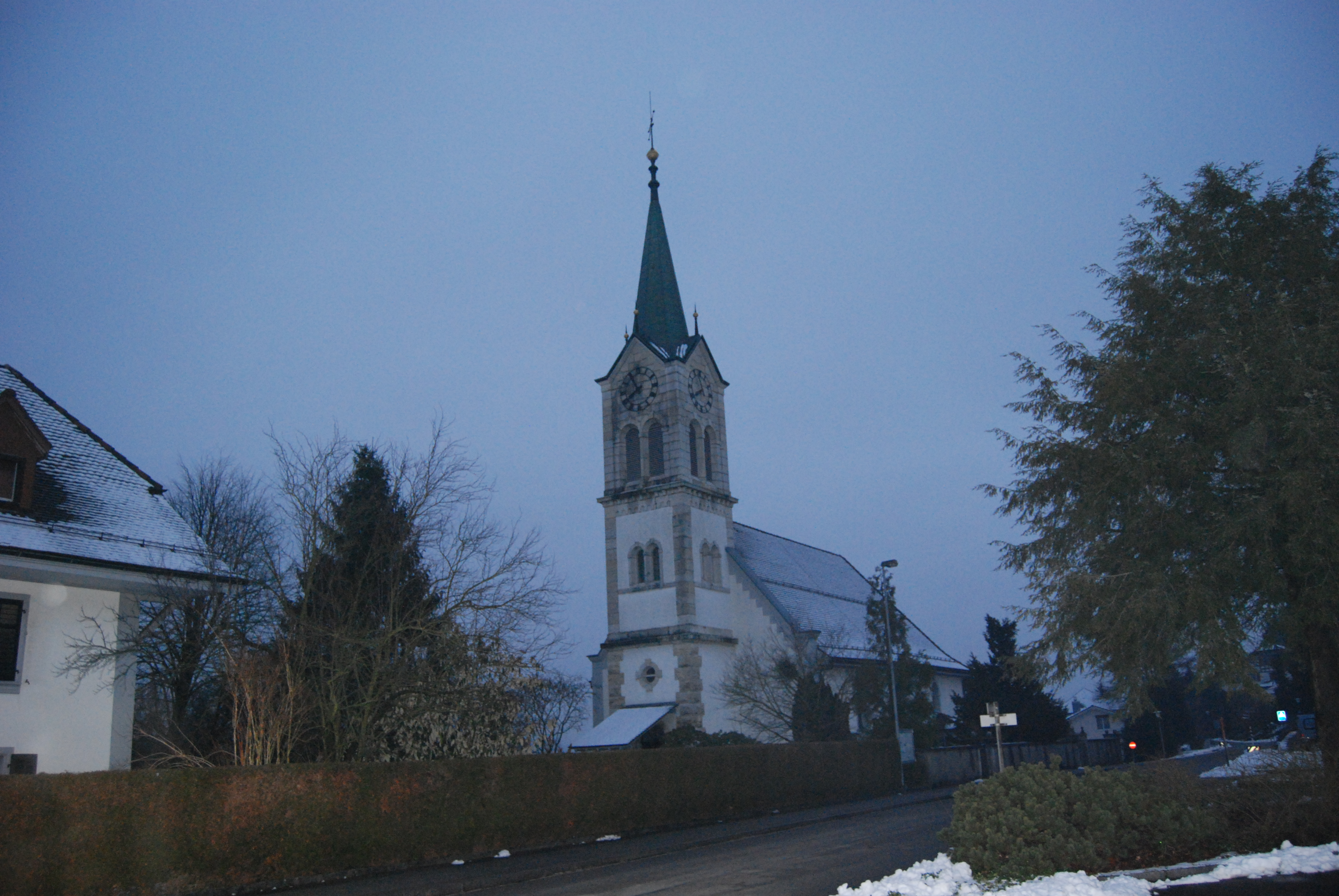

- Flag Coat of arms
- Location of Rothrist
- Location within Switzerland Location within Canton of Aargau
- Coordinates: 47°18′N 7°53′E
- Country: Switzerland
- Canton: Aargau
- District: Zofingen

Area
  - Total: 11.84 km^{2} (4.57 sq mi)
- Elevation: 411 m (1,348 ft)

Population (December 2006)
  - Total: 7,321
  - Density: 618.3/km^{2} (1,601/sq mi)
- Time zone: UTC+01:00 (CET)
  - Summer (DST): UTC+02:00 (CEST)
- Postal code: 4852
- SFOS number: 4282
- ISO 3166 code: CH-AG
- Surrounded by: Aarburg, Boningen (SO), Murgenthal, Oftringen, Olten (SO), Strengelbach, Vordemwald
- Twin towns: Eggerberg (Switzerland)
- Website: www.rothrist.ch

Rothrist is a municipality in the district of Zofingen in the canton of Aargau in Switzerland.

== History ==
Originally an Alamanni settlement, the modern village of Rothrist is first mentioned in 1263 as Routris. The Herrschaft rights were held by the Counts of Frohburg until 1299, when they transferred to the Habsburgs. Following the conquest of the Aargau in 1415, it became part of Bern. Under both the Habsburgs and Bern, it was part of the court of Aarburg. From 1798 until 1802 it was part of the Canton of Bern, and in 1803, it came to the newly created Canton of Aargau as part of the Zofingen district. In 1706 the municipality built its first schoolhouse on the Hölzli. In 1917 a district school opened. The municipal museum (Heimatmuseum) was built in 1970.

Throughout the Middle Ages it was part of the church parish of Zofingen kirchgenössig. Between 1667 and 1714 it was under the ecclesiastical court of Oftringen. In 1714 the Reformed parish of Rothrist was established with its own church. The village's Catholic church was built in 1971.

Aerial view (1957)

In the 18th century, agriculture and the home weaving industry dominated in Rothrist. Along the rivers in the lower Pfaffner and Wigger valleys, small businesses opened in the 19th century. Because of the economic crisis on 1855, 300 residents of the village were forced to emigrate to America. Five years after connecting to the Olten-Bern railway line in 1857, the first large factory was built on the west boundary of the municipality. This factory, a spinning mill, used the water power of the Rotkanal. A strong push toward industrialization began after 1930. Then, in 1952 the soft drink company Rivella was founded. Due to the motorway junction, a number of companies and factories settled along the access roads in the municipality. The number of jobs in the municipality rose from 1,429 in 1950 to 3,952 in 2005.

== Geography ==
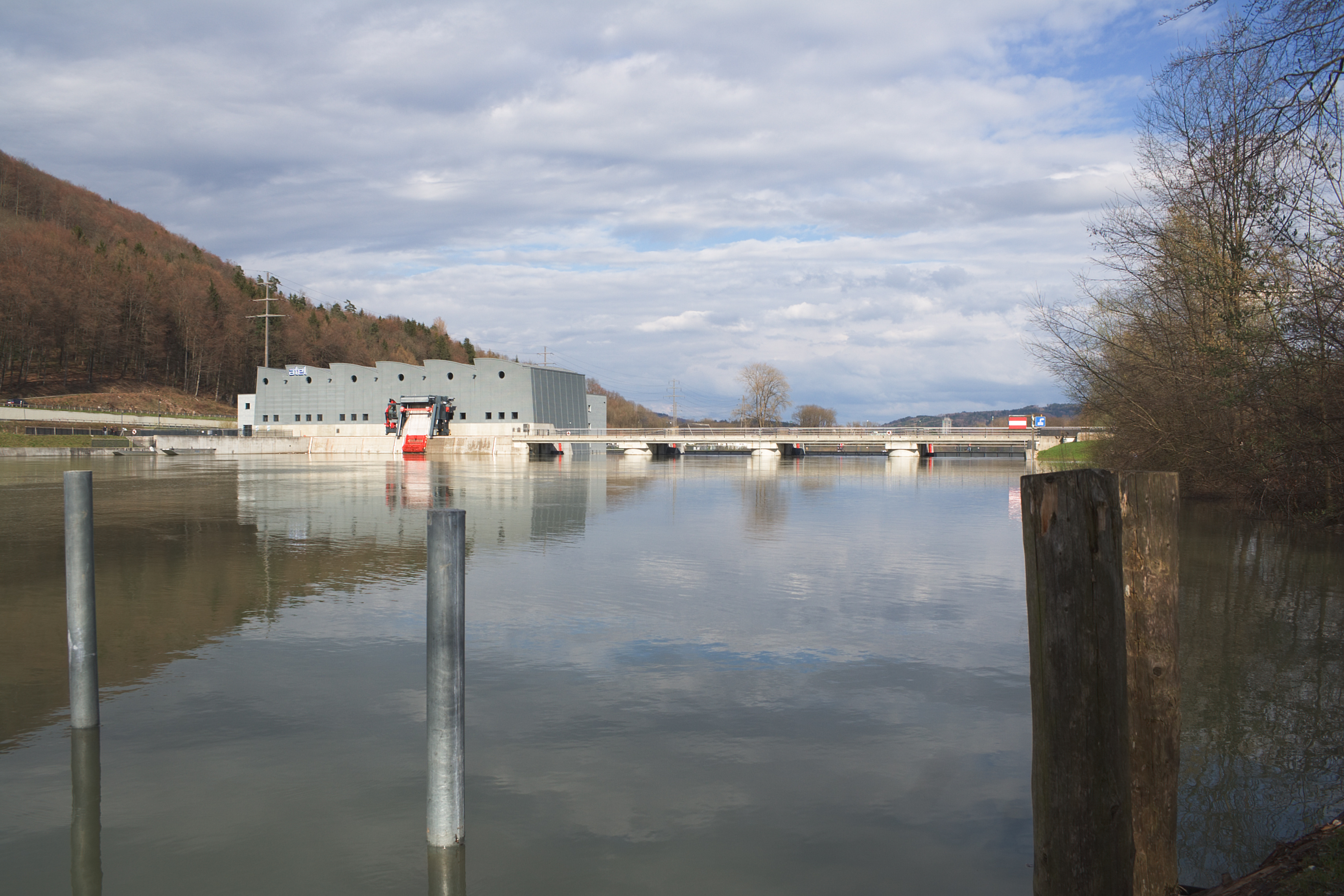
Ruppoldingen hydroelectric plant, near Rothrist

Rothrist has an area, as of 2009, of 11.84 square kilometers (4.57 sq mi). Of this area, 4 km^{2} (1.5 sq mi) or 33.8% is used for agricultural purposes, while 3.88 km^{2} (1.50 sq mi) or 32.8% is forested. Of the rest of the land, 3.62 km^{2} (1.40 sq mi) or 30.6% is settled (buildings or roads), 0.24 km^{2} (0.093 sq mi) or 2.0% is either rivers or lakes and 0.03 km^{2} (7.4 acres) or 0.3% is unproductive land.

Of the built up area, industrial buildings made up 5.2% of the total area while housing and buildings made up 14.9% and transportation infrastructure made up 7.8%. Power and water infrastructure as well as other special developed areas made up 1.9% of the area Out of the forested land, 30.9% of the total land area is heavily forested and 1.9% is covered with orchards or small clusters of trees. Of the agricultural land, 21.7% is used for growing crops and 11.0% is pastures, while 1.1% is used for orchards or vine crops. All the water in the municipality is flowing water.

The municipality is located in the Zofingen district, along a bend in the Aare river. It is located west of the confluence of the Pfaffnern and Wigger rivers. It consists of the village of Rothrist and a number of scattered the hamlets.

== Coat of arms ==
The blazon of the municipal coat of arms is Gules a Ploughshare Argent between in chief two Mullets of Five of the same and Coupeaux Vert.

== Demographics ==
Rothrist has a population (as of December 2020) of 9,290. As of June 2009, 19.1% of the population are foreign nationals. Over the last 10 years (1997–2007) the population has changed at a rate of 7%. Most of the population (as of 2000) speaks German (87.4%), with Serbo-Croatian being second most common (3.2%) and Italian being third (3.1%).

The age distribution, as of 2008, in Rothrist is; 731 children or 9.6% of the population are between 0 and 9 years old and 855 teenagers or 11.3% are between 10 and 19. Of the adult population, 1,019 people or 13.4% of the population are between 20 and 29 years old. 1,077 people or 14.2% are between 30 and 39, 1,208 people or 15.9% are between 40 and 49, and 1,035 people or 13.6% are between 50 and 59. The senior population distribution is 821 people or 10.8% of the population are between 60 and 69 years old, 507 people or 6.7% are between 70 and 79, there are 286 people or 3.8% who are between 80 and 89, and there are 52 people or 0.7% who are 90 and older.

As of 2000, there were 243 homes with 1 or 2 persons in the household, 1,439 homes with 3 or 4 persons in the household, and 1,017 homes with 5 or more persons in the household. As of 2000, there were 2,748 private households (homes and apartments) in the municipality, and an average of 2.4 persons per household. In 2008 there were 1,315 single family homes (or 38.8% of the total) out of a total of 3,385 homes and apartments. There were a total of 8 empty apartments for a 0.2% vacancy rate. As of 2007, the construction rate of new housing units was 3.8 new units per 1000 residents.

In the 2007 federal election the most popular party was the SVP which received 38.06% of the vote. The next three most popular parties were the SP (18.37%), the FDP (13.4%) and the EVP Party (7.71%). In the federal election, a total of 2,081 votes were cast, and the voter turnout was 41.2%.

The historical population is given in the following table:

Historical population
Year	Pop.	±%
1764	1,121	—
1850	2,620	+133.7%
1900	2,846	+8.6%
1950	4,219	+48.2%
2000	6,869	+62.8%

== Economy ==
As of 2007, Rothrist had an unemployment rate of 2.33%. As of 2005, there were 58 people employed in the primary economic sector and about 28 businesses involved in this sector. 1,754 people are employed in the secondary sector and there are 89 businesses in this sector. 2,140 people are employed in the tertiary sector, with 238 businesses in this sector.

In 2000 there were 3,616 workers who lived in the municipality. Of these, 2,245 or about 62.1% of the residents worked outside Rothrist while 2,151 people commuted into the municipality for work. There were a total of 3,522 jobs (of at least 6 hours per week) in the municipality. Of the working population, 9.4% used public transportation to get to work, and 53.3% used a private car.

== Religion ==
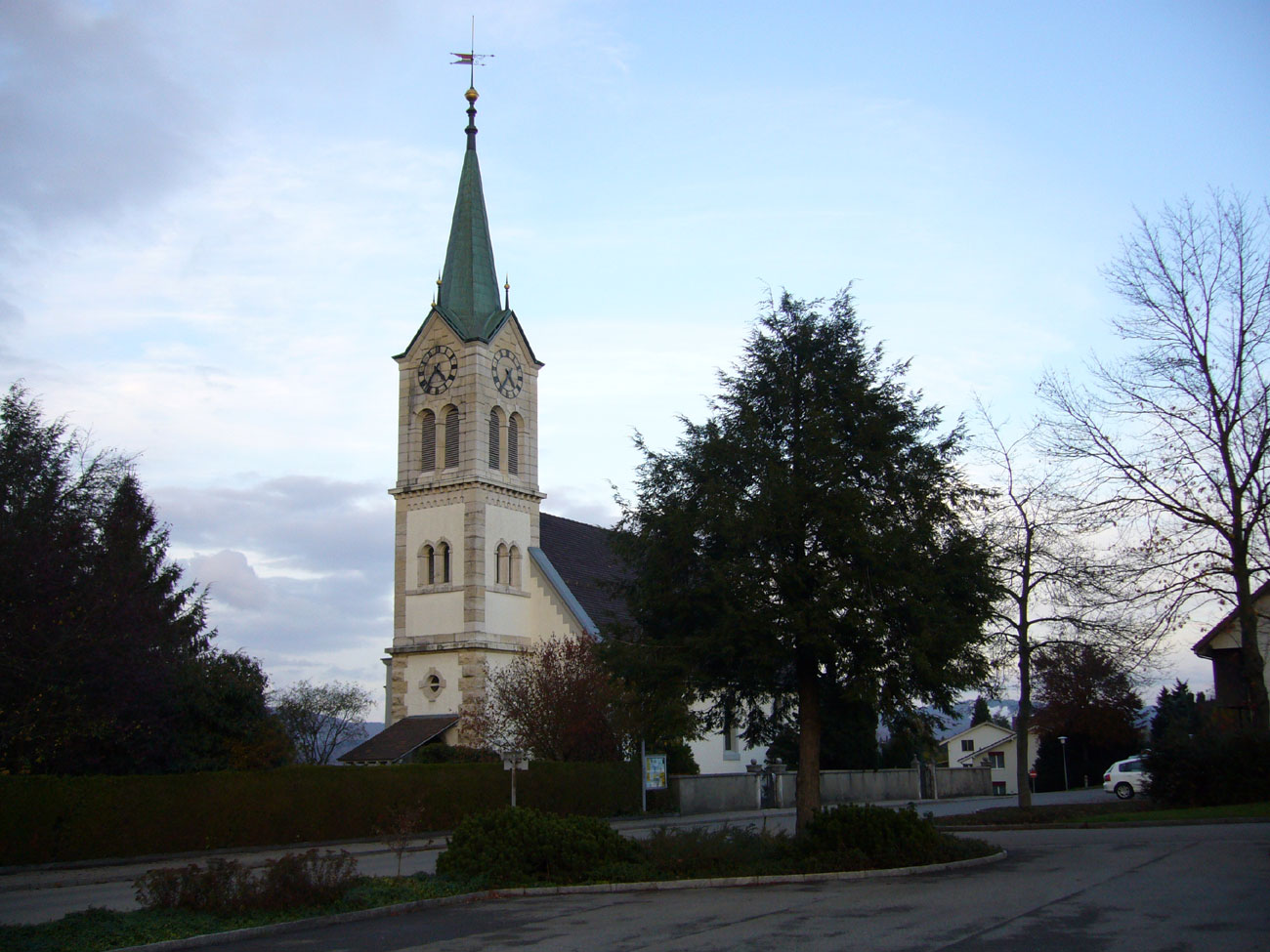
Church in Rothrist

From the 2000 census, 1,674 or 24.4% were Roman Catholic, while 3,757 or 54.7% belonged to the Swiss Reformed Church. Of the rest of the population, there were 16 individuals (or about 0.23% of the population) who belonged to the Christian Catholic faith.

== Education ==
In Rothrist about 67.8% of the population (between age 25 and 64) have completed either non-mandatory upper secondary education or additional higher education (either university or a Fachhochschule). Of the school age population (in the 2008/2009 school year), there are 532 students attending primary school, there are 208 students attending secondary school, there are 158 students attending tertiary or university level schooling in the municipality.

Rothrist is home to the Schul-u.Gde.Bibliothek Rothrist (school and municipal library of Rothrist). The library has (as of 2008) 7,095 books or other media, and loaned out 16,365 items in the same year. It was open a total of 213 days with average of 8 hours per week during that year.

== Transportation ==
The municipality has a railway station, Rothrist, on the Olten–Bern line. It has regular service to Langenthal and Baden.
