= Murgenthal =

- Municipality
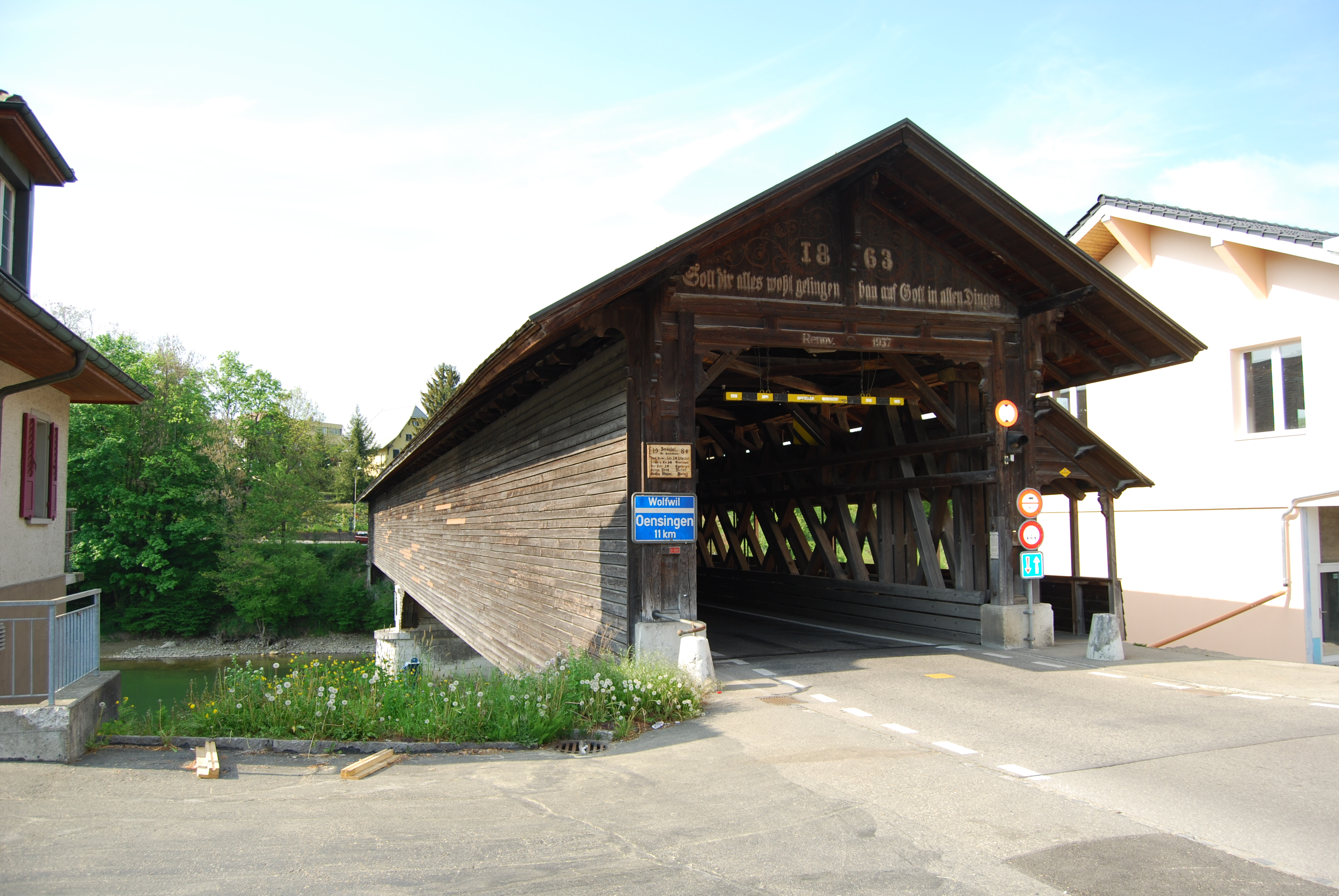

- Flag Coat of arms
- Location of Murgenthal
- Location within Switzerland Location within Canton of Aargau
- Coordinates: 47°16′N 7°50′E
- Country: Switzerland
- Canton: Aargau
- District: Zofingen

Area
  - Total: 18.65 km^{2} (7.20 sq mi)
- Elevation: 412 m (1,352 ft)

Population (December 2006)
  - Total: 2,847
  - Density: 152.7/km^{2} (395.4/sq mi)
- Time zone: UTC+01:00 (CET)
  - Summer (DST): UTC+02:00 (CEST)
- Postal code: 4853
- SFOS number: 4279
- ISO 3166 code: CH-AG
- Surrounded by: Boningen (SO), Brittnau, Fulenbach (SO), Pfaffnau (LU), Roggwil (BE), Rothrist, Vordemwald, Wolfwil (SO), Wynau (BE)
- Website: murgenthal.ch

Murgenthal is a municipality in the district of Zofingen in the canton of Aargau in Switzerland.

== History ==
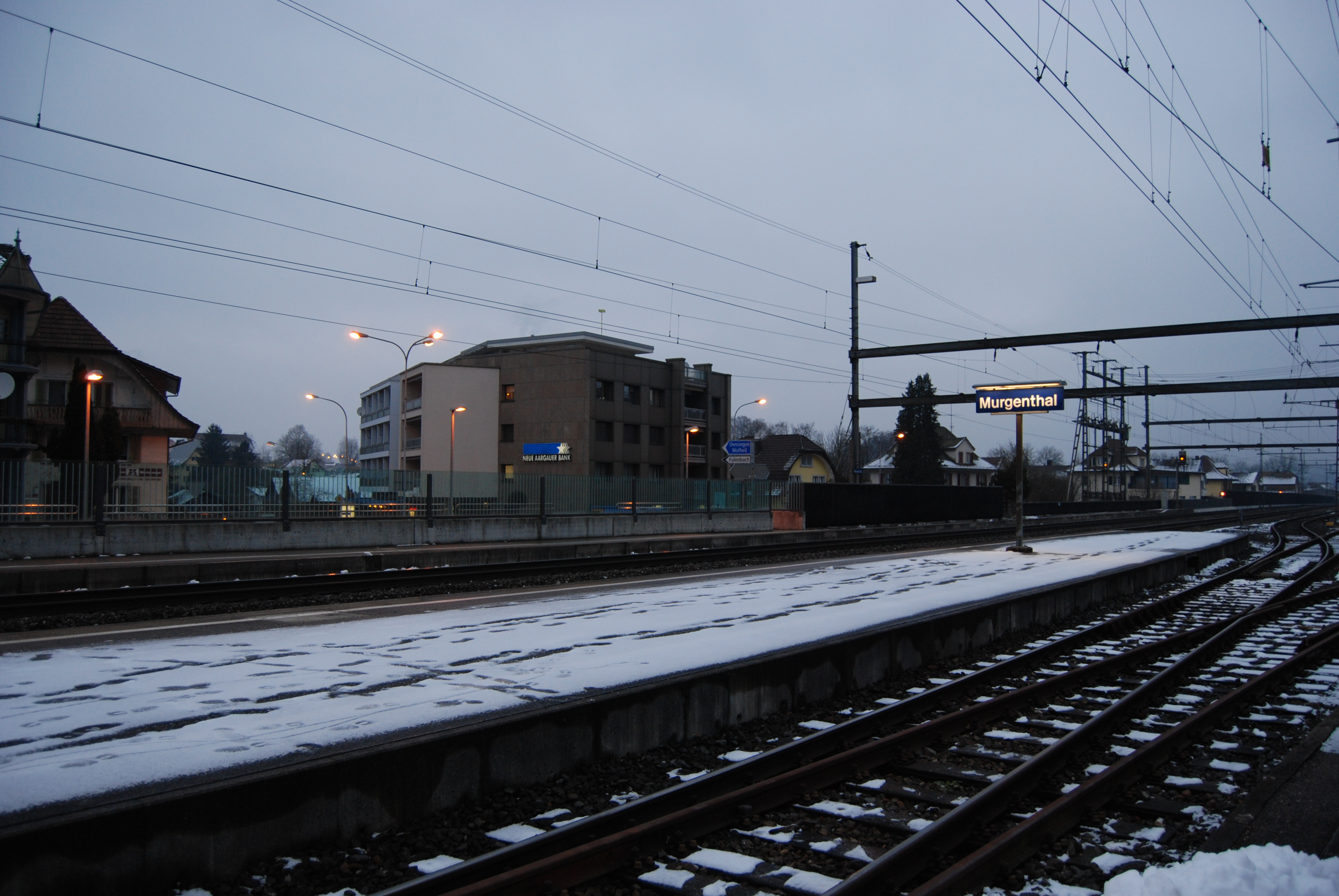
Murgenthal railway station. Most of the growth of Murgenthal is due to the railway

Aerial view (1970)

Murgenthal is first mentioned in 1255 as Murgatun. The Herrschaft rights to the village belonged to the Counts of Frohburg until 1299, when they went to the Habsburgs. From the Bernese conquest of the Aargau in 1415, until 1798, the rights were held by city of Bern. Between 1640 and 1645 the Governor of Aarburg, Jacob Wyss, build the 8.5 km (5.3 mi) Rotkanal (Red Canal) which transported water from the head waters of the Murg river to the meadows at Rothrist. Between 1798 and 1802 it was part of the Canton of Bern. Since 1803 it belongs to the canton of Aargau. Until 1900 the village of Murgenthal was part of the municipality of Riken. In 1901 the municipality of Riken joined the municipality of Balzenwil to form the new municipality of Murgenthal.

Under Bernese rule the villagers were part of the Wynau and Roggwil parishes. In 1817 a new parish was established and in 1901 its name was changed to the Riken Murgenthal parish. The romanesque revival parish church was built in 1852–54 in Glashütten. However, it was replaced in 1964 by a new building.

In 1857, a railway station on the Olten-Bern line was built in Murgenthal. The wooden bridge was built over the Aare river to Fulenbach in 1863. With the railroad and access to the Rotkanal, several factories were built in Murgenthal. In 1856 the Grossmann (later Künzli & Co.) weaving factory opened. In 1881 Arnold Künzli founded the knitting factory of His & Cie, which operated until 1976 in Murgenthal. Additionally, a wicker and wood products factory opened in 1894. The village continued to develop due to the railway and factories. In 1920, about 63% of the working population worked in manufacturing. By 2005 that number had dropped to only 28%. The number of jobs in the municipality has dropped to about half of the peak number in 1950 (1,485 jobs) due to factory closings.

The first village school was held in the 17th century. School houses were built in 1825 in Glashütten, 1826 in Balzenwil, 1842 in Riken and 1883 in Murgenthal.

== Geography ==
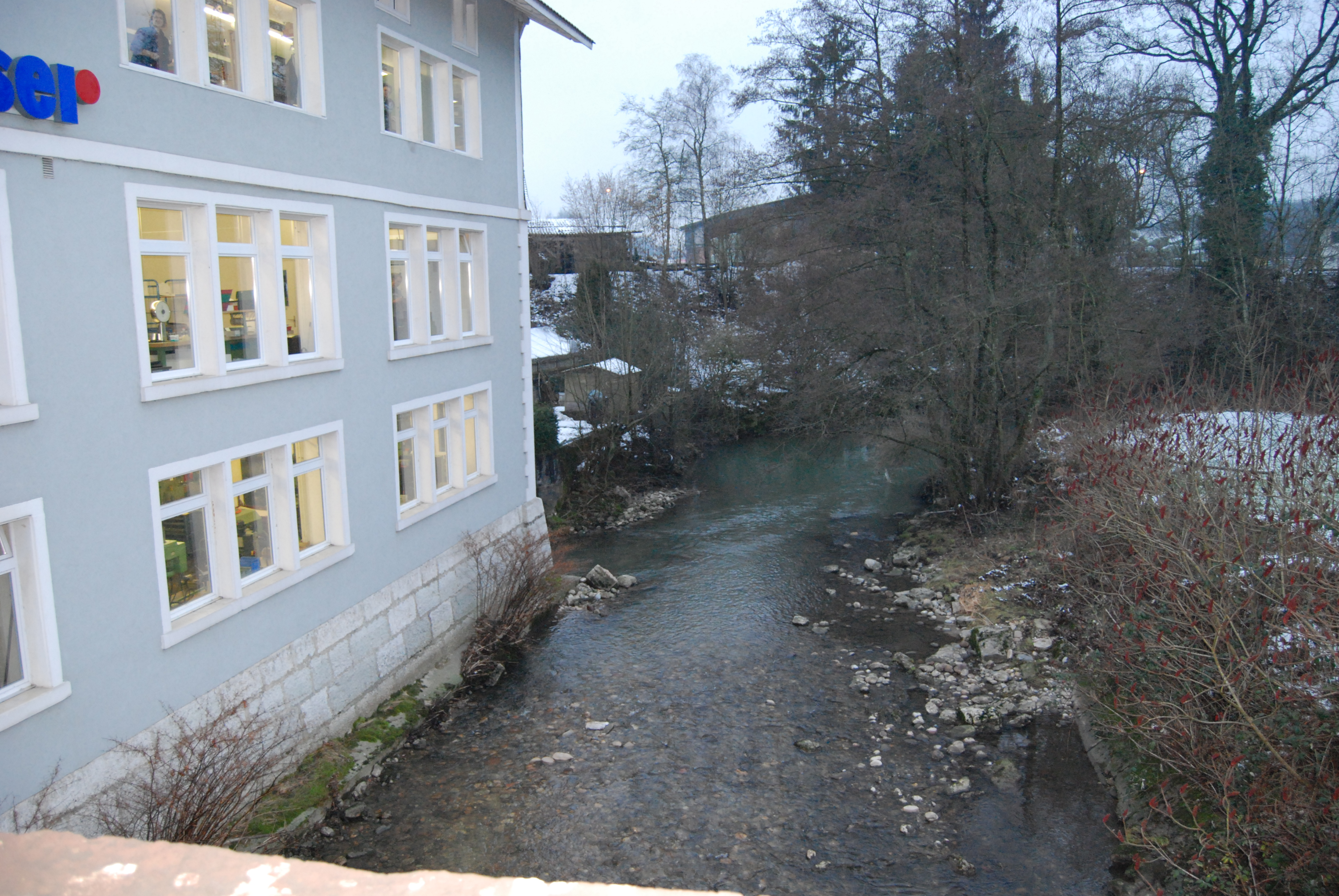
Murg river, seen from the bridge between Murgenthal and Wynau (canton Bern)

Murgenthal has an area, as of 2009, of 18.65 square kilometers (7.20 sq mi). Of this area, 5.18 km^{2} (2.00 sq mi) or 27.8% is used for agricultural purposes, while 11.71 km^{2} (4.52 sq mi) or 62.8% is forested. Of the rest of the land, 1.51 km^{2} (0.58 sq mi) or 8.1% is settled (buildings or roads), 0.22 km^{2} (0.085 sq mi) or 1.2% is either rivers or lakes.

Of the built up area, housing and buildings made up 4.2% and transportation infrastructure made up 3.1%. Out of the forested land, 61.7% of the total land area is heavily forested and 1.1% is covered with orchards or small clusters of trees. Of the agricultural land, 19.3% is used for growing crops and 7.7% is pastures. All the water in the municipality is flowing water.

The municipality is located in the Zofingen district, at the confluence of the Murg river into the Aare river. It is on the border between the Canton of Aargau and the Canton of Bern. It consists of the village of Murgenthal and the hamlets of Walliswil, Balzenwil, Glashütten and Riken.

== Coat of arms ==
The blazon of the municipal coat of arms is Azure three Trefoils slipped Argent issuant from Coupeaux Vert and in Chief a Cross pattee couped of the second.

== Demographics ==
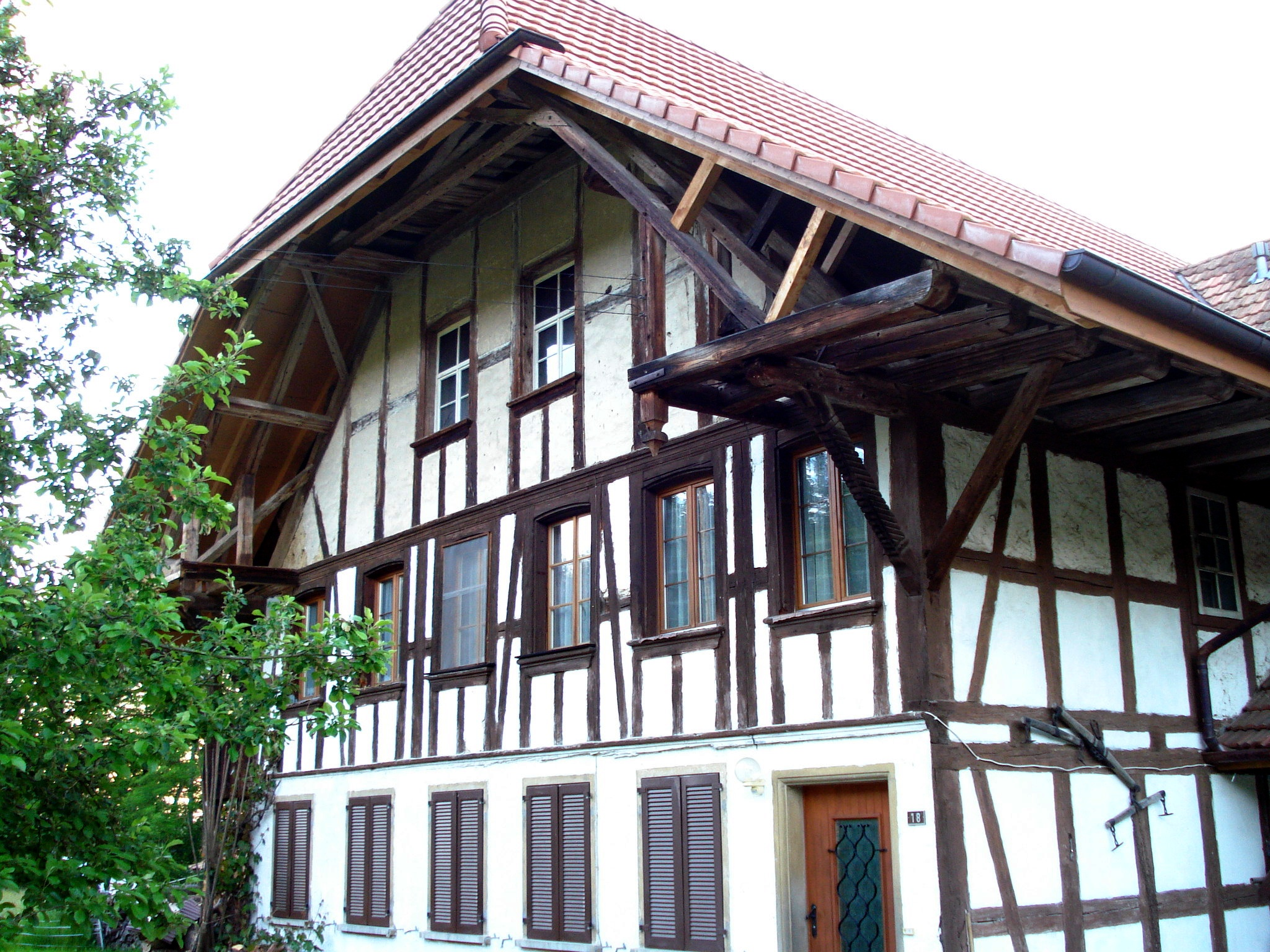
Typical Aargau farmhouse, from Riken village

Murgenthal has a population (as of December 2020) of 2,959. As of June 2009, 15.3% of the population are foreign nationals. Over the last 10 years (1997–2007) the population has changed at a rate of -0.5%. Most of the population (as of 2000) speaks German (90.7%), with Albanian being second most common ( 2.8%) and Italian being third ( 2.2%).

The age distribution, as of 2008, in Murgenthal is; 263 children or 9.2% of the population are between 0 and 9 years old and 332 teenagers or 11.6% are between 10 and 19. Of the adult population, 387 people or 13.5% of the population are between 20 and 29 years old. 397 people or 13.8% are between 30 and 39, 461 people or 16.1% are between 40 and 49, and 433 people or 15.1% are between 50 and 59. The senior population distribution is 271 people or 9.4% of the population are between 60 and 69 years old, 198 people or 6.9% are between 70 and 79, there are 106 people or 3.7% who are between 80 and 89, and there are 22 people or 0.8% who are 90 and older.

As of 2000 the average number of residents per living room was 0.56 which is about equal to the cantonal average of 0.57 per room. In this case, a room is defined as space of a housing unit of at least 4 m^{2} (43 sq ft) as normal bedrooms, dining rooms, living rooms, kitchens and habitable cellars and attics. About 59.8% of the total households were owner occupied, or in other words did not pay rent (though they may have a mortgage or a rent-to-own agreement).

As of 2000, there were 70 homes with 1 or 2 persons in the household, 484 homes with 3 or 4 persons in the household, and 468 homes with 5 or more persons in the household. As of 2000, there were 1,039 private households (homes and apartments) in the municipality, and an average of 2.5 persons per household. In 2008 there were 538 single family homes (or 44.1% of the total) out of a total of 1,219 homes and apartments. There were a total of 62 empty apartments for a 5.1% vacancy rate. As of 2007, the construction rate of new housing units was 3.2 new units per 1000 residents.

In the 2007 federal election the most popular party was the SVP which received 48.67% of the vote. The next two most popular parties were the SP (13.32%), and the FDP (12.83%). In the federal election, a total of 854 votes were cast, and the voter turnout was 43.5%.

The historical population is given in the following table:

Historical population
Year	Pop.	±%
1764	773	—
1910	2,171	+180.9%
1950	2,638	+21.5%
1980	2,537	−3.8%
1990	2,715	+7.0%
2000	2,741	+1.0%

== Economy ==
As of 2007, Murgenthal had an unemployment rate of 2.46%. As of 2005, there were 99 people employed in the primary economic sector and about 40 businesses involved in this sector. 221 people are employed in the secondary sector and there are 41 businesses in this sector. 483 people are employed in the tertiary sector, with 110 businesses in this sector.

In 2000 there were 1,412 workers who lived in the municipality. Of these, 992 or about 70.3% of the residents worked outside Murgenthal while 419 people commuted into the municipality for work. There were a total of 839 jobs (of at least 6 hours per week) in the municipality. Of the working population, 10.1% used public transportation to get to work, and 53.7% used a private car.

== Religion ==
From the 2000 census, 577 or 21.1% were Roman Catholic, while 1,574 or 57.4% belonged to the Swiss Reformed Church. Of the rest of the population, there were 3 individuals (or about 0.11% of the population) who belonged to the Christian Catholic faith.

== Education ==
In Murgenthal about 70.1% of the population (between age 25 and 64) have completed either non-mandatory upper secondary education or additional higher education (either university or a Fachhochschule). Of the school age population (in the 2008/2009 school year), there are 185 students attending primary school, there are 66 students attending secondary school in the municipality.

Murgenthal is home to the Schul-u.Gde.Bibliothek Murgenthal (school and municipal library of Murgenthal). The library has (as of 2008) 4,422 books or other media, and loaned out 4,166 items in the same year. It was open a total of 131 days with average of 4 hours per week during that year.

== Transportation ==
The municipality has a railway station, Murgenthal, on the Olten–Bern line. It has regular service to Langenthal and Baden.

== The Murgenthal Status ==
The Murgenthal Status stipulates that the flow of the Aare must not exceed 850m^{3}/s (30,000 cu ft/s) at the gauge of Murgenthal's station which is located downstream of the confluence of the Aare and the Emme rivers. When the Emme river flow increases, the flow of the Aare river downstream of their confluence also increases accordingly, which may cause flooding downstream in the cantons of Solothurn and of Aargau.

Thus, the Status sets the speed that the Aare should not exceed: if the flow increases too much, then the regulating dam Port must limit the flow of the Aare river upstream, the three Seeland lakes being used to absorb the crest of the flood, until the end of the overflow of the Emme river. The system was complemented by the Flumenthal dam during the Second Jura water correction.
